= Marjorie Bennett =

Actress (1896–1982)

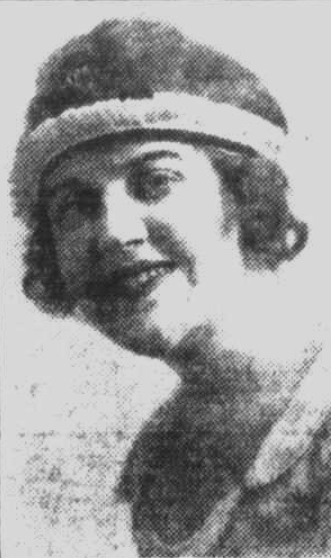
- Bennett in 1922
- Born: 15 January 1896; York, Western Australia, Australia
- Died: 14 June 1982 (aged 86); Hollywood, Los Angeles, U.S.
- Other names: Margery Bennett; Marjorie E. Bennett
- Occupation: Actress
- Years active: 1917–1980
- Spouse: William Cady Jr. (m. 1932; died 1976)
- Relatives: Enid Bennett (sister)

Marjorie Bennett (15 January 1896 – 14 June 1982) was an Australian actress who worked mainly in the United States. She began her acting career during the silent film era.

== Early life ==
Marjorie Bennett was born on 15 January 1896 in York in Western Australia. Her sisters Enid (1893–1969) and Catherine (1901–1978) were also Hollywood film actresses.

== Career ==
Bennett began acting in films in 1917 and later made the transition to talking pictures with bit roles in Monsieur Verdoux (1947), Abbott and Costello Meet the Killer, Boris Karloff (1949), and Washington Story (1952). In 1952, she appeared as Charlie Chaplin's landlady in the film Limelight and later had guest roles on The Great Gildersleeve, Four Star Playhouse, Sergeant Preston of the Yukon, I Love Lucy, Schlitz Playhouse of Stars, and December Bride. In 1959 she appeared on Wagon Train S3 E5 "The Elizabeth McQueeny Story" as one of the dancing girls being taken West by the title character played by Bette Davis. Between 1958 and 1961, she appeared as Amanda Comstock in three episodes of ABC's The Real McCoys, starring Walter Brennan. From 1959 to 1961, she was cast ten times as Blossom Kenney on CBS' The Many Loves of Dobie Gillis, starring Dwayne Hickman. In 1962, she played Victor Buono's mother in Whatever Happened to Baby Jane?.

During the 1970s, Bennett had television roles on Mission: Impossible, Adam-12, CHiPs, Night Gallery, McMillan & Wife, and Phyllis. She had a role opposite Richard Widmark in the 1973 television film Brock's Last Case. In the 1973 film Charley Varrick, starring Walter Matthau, Bennett portrayed Mrs. Taft, an elderly gardener living in a trailer park who is convinced that every man she meets wants to seduce her. Bennett also appeared in several television commercials in the 1970s. She made her last on-screen appearance in 1980 on ABC's Barney Miller series.

== Personal life and death ==
Bennett was married to William Cady Jr. from 1932 until his death in 1976.

Bennett died in Hollywood, California, on 14 June 1982, and her ashes were interred in the Great Mausoleum's Columbarium of Dawn at Forest Lawn Memorial Park Cemetery in Glendale.

== Filmography ==
Film
Year	Title	Role	Notes
1917	The Girl, Glory	Sally Barton	Credited as Margery Bennett
1918	Naughty, Naughty!	Prudence Sampson	
1918	Hugon, The Mighty	Marie	
1918	The Midnight Patrol	Minnie	
1946	Dressed to Kill	Antique shop assistant	Uncredited
1947	Monsieur Verdoux	Maid of Marie Grosnay	
1948	To the Victor	Pablo's Model	Uncredited
1948	Silver River	Large Woman	Uncredited
1948	The Big Punch	Housekeeper	Uncredited
1948	June Bride	Mrs. Nellie Brinker	
1949	Flaxy Martin	Nora's Neighbor	Uncredited
1949	Take One False Step	Waitress	Uncredited
1949	Abbott and Costello Meet the Killer, Boris Karloff	Second Maid	Uncredited
1949	Undertow	Wife at bar in Vegas	Uncredited
1950	Perfect Strangers	Mrs. Moore	
1950	Peggy	Flossie the Maid	Uncredited
1950	Two Flags West	Mrs. Simpkins	Uncredited
1950	The Man Who Cheated Himself	Mrs. Muriel Quimby	
1951	Lightning Strikes Twice	Drug Store Customer	Uncredited
1952	The Congregation		
1952	Washington Story	Woman with Pass	Uncredited
1952	Limelight	Mrs. Alsop	
1952	The Steel Trap	Cleaning Woman	Uncredited
1953	Never Wave at a WAC	Mrs. Martha Pratt	Uncredited
1953	Abbott and Costello Meet Dr. Jekyll and Mr. Hyde	Militant Woman on Soapbox	Uncredited
1953	So Big	Housekeeper	Uncredited
1954	Ma and Pa Kettle at Home	Corset Saleslady	Uncredited
1954	Sabrina	Margaret	
1954	The Human Jungle	Mrs. Lee	Uncredited
1954	Ricochet Romance	Mrs. Harvey	
1954	Young at Heart	Mrs. Ridgefield	Uncredited
1955	Abbott and Costello Meet the Keystone Kops	Fat Movie Patron	Uncredited
1955	Kiss Me Deadly	Manager	
1955	The Cobweb	Sadie	
1955	Lay That Rifle Down	Mrs. Speckleton	Uncredited
1955	Female on the Beach	Mrs. Murchison	
1955	The Girl Rush	Woman at Dice Table	
1956	Our Miss Brooks	Mrs. J. Boynton	Uncredited
1956	Autumn Leaves	Waitress	
1956	Strange Intruder	Jodie, Carmichaels' maid	
1956	The Girl He Left Behind	Madeline's Friend	Uncredited
1956	Death of a Scoundrel	Angry Woman	Uncredited
1957	The Iron Sheriff	Nettie Holcomb	Uncredited
1957	Shoot-Out at Medicine Bend	Townswoman	Uncredited
1957	Man of a Thousand Faces	Vera, Housekeeper	Uncredited
1958	Man on Fire	Mrs. Delaney	Uncredited
1958	Cry Terror!	Woman in Elevator	Uncredited
1958	Home Before Dark	Hazel Evans	
1959	No Name on the Bullet	Store Customer	Uncredited
1959	Holiday for Lovers	Elvira	Uncredited
1959	Have Rocket, Will Travel	Mrs. Hermine Huntingford	Uncredited
1959	Career	Fan Magazine Columnist	
1960	The Rat Race	Mrs. Edie Kerry	
1960	Ocean's 11	Mrs. Allenby	Uncredited
1961	One Hundred and One Dalmatians	Duchess	Voice
1961	A Thunder of Drums	Mrs. Yates	
1961	Summer and Smoke	Saleslady	Uncredited
1961	Sail a Crooked Ship	Mrs. Chowder	
1962	Saintly Sinners	Mrs. Madigan	Uncredited
1962	The Notorious Landlady	Autograph Seeker	Uncredited
1962	What Ever Happened to Baby Jane?	Dehlia Flagg	
1962	Girls! Girls! Girls!	Mrs. Dicks	Uncredited
1963	Promises! Promises!	Mrs. Snavely	
1963	4 for Texas	Miss Emmaline	
1963	The Man from Galveston	Mrs. Warren	
1964	What a Way to Go!	Mrs. Freeman	Uncredited
1964	3 Nuts in Search of a Bolt	Mrs. Berkeley-Kent	
1964	The New Interns	Apartment Superintendent	Uncredited
1964	Mary Poppins	Miss Lark	
1964	Quick Before It Melts	Bar Maid	
1964	My Fair Lady	Cockney with Pipe	Uncredited
1964	36 Hours	Charwoman	
1964	The Night Walker	Manager	
1965	Zebra in the Kitchen	Hefty Woman	Uncredited
1965	The Family Jewels	Airline Passenger #5	
1966	Billy the Kid Versus Dracula	Mary Ann Bentley	
1966	The Swinger	Philbert's Wife	Uncredited
1967	The Reluctant Astronaut	Woman at Mailbox	Uncredited
1967	Games	Nora	
1968	Coogan's Bluff	Mrs. Fowler, Little Old Lady	
1968	Creature of Comfort		
1969	The Love God?	Miss Pickering	
1971	Calliope	Snoopy lady	Alternative title: Love Is Catching
1973	Stacey	Florence Chambers	
1973	Charley Varrick	Mrs. Taft	Alternative title: Kill Charley Varrick
1974	Harrad Summer		
1974	Airport 1975	50th Anniversary Celebrant – Passenger	
1975	I Wonder Who's Killing Her Now?	Sleepy Bartender	
1979	The North Avenue Irregulars	Mother Thurber	Alternative title: Hill's Angels
Television
Year	Title	Role	Notes
1951	The Adventures of Wild Bill Hickok	Widow	Season 1 Episode 8: "The Tax Collecting Story"
1952	Racket Squad	Mrs. Fogarty	Season 3 Episode 6: "Beauty for Hire"
1953	The Pride of the Family	Mrs. Mallory	Season 1 Episode 5: "Albie Sells the House"
1953	I Married Joan	Aquarium Society Woman	Season 2 Episode 5: "Tropical Fish"
1953	I Married Joan	Miss Patterson	Season 2 Episode 7: "Initiation"
1954	My Little Margie	Miss Flannigan / The Old Lady Robber	Season 3 Episode 25: "Margie Babysits"
1954	Lassie	Birdie Brockway (uncredited)	Season 1 Episode 7: "Feud"
1954	Lassie	Birdie Brockway (uncredited)	Season 1 Episode 13: "Sale of Lassie"
1955	I Married Joan	Ruth	Season 3 Episode 24: "How to Win Friends"
1955–1958	The Bob Cummings Show	Mrs. Neimeyer	6 episodes
1956	Lassie	Birdie Brockway	Season 2 Episode 27: "Lassie's Double"
1956	Lassie	Birdie Brockway	Season 2 Episode 38: "Diane"
1956	Cheyenne	Mrs. Smallwood	Season 1 Episode 7: "Decision"
1957	Lassie	Birdie Brockway (uncredited)	Season 4 Episode 13: "Transition"
1957	Alfred Hitchcock Presents	Cake Lady (uncredited)	Season 2 Episode 33: "A Man Greatly Beloved"
1957	The Ford Television Theatre	Mrs. Morris	Season 5 Episode 25: "The Man Across the Hall"
1957–1959	The Thin Man	Mrs. Blascombe	6 episodes
1958	Trackdown	Hetty Lake	Season 2 Episode 2: "Outlaw's Wife"
1958–1962	The Real McCoys	Amanda Comstock	5 episodes
1959	Buckskin	Mrs. Newcombe	Season 1 Episode 35: "The Manager"
1959-1961	The Many Loves of Dobie Gillis	Blossom Kenney	10 episodes
1960	Adventures in Paradise	Agnes Higgins	Season 2 Episode 12: "Incident in Suva"
1960	The Twilight Zone	Old Woman	Season 1 Episode 31: "The Chaser"
1960	The Tom Ewell Show	Flora Roberts	Season 1 Episode 9: "Site Unseen"
1961	Alfred Hitchcock Presents	Elderly Woman	Season 7 Episode 3: "Maria"
1961	Hong Kong	Matron	1 episode
1962	Alfred Hitchcock Presents	Mrs. Phelan the Maid (uncredited)	Season 7 Episode 36: "First Class Honeymoon"
1962	The Twilight Zone	Mrs. Summers	Season 3 Episode 21: "Kick the Can"
1962	Thriller	Mercedes	Season 2 Episode 29: "The Lethal Ladies"
1963	The Twilight Zone	Mrs. Chamberlain	Season 4 Episode 10: "No Time Like the Past"
1963	The Joey Bishop Show	Mrs. Fenton	Season 2 Episode 21: "Ellie, the Talent Scout"
1964	The Alfred Hitchcock Hour	Plump Lady	Season 2 Episode 24: "The Gentleman Caller"
1964	The Beverly Hillbillies	Mrs. Langwell	Season 2 Episode 29: "The Dress Shop"
1965	Petticoat Junction	Miss Hogan	Season 3 Episode 9: "Hooterville Hurricane"
1966	That Girl	Credited as Woman (Rose from Yonkers)	Season 1 Episode 12 "Soap Gets In Your Eyes"
1966	Hey, Landlord	Mrs. Fritzell	Season 1 Episode 15: "How're You Gonna Keep 'em Down, After They've Seen the Rug"
1967	Ironside	Hotel Clerk	Season 1 Episode 7: "Tagged for Murder"
1968	The Virginian	Soapie	Season 7 Episode 11: "The Mustangers"
1969	The Mothers-in-Law	Lucille	Season 2 Episode 26: "The Not-So-Grand Opera"
1969	Room 222	The Supervisor	Season 1 Episode 11: "Alice in Blunderland"
1970	The Mod Squad	Mrs. MacCready	Season 2 Episode 15: "Sweet Child of Terror"
1971	The Mod Squad	Landlady	Season 4 Episode 13: "Death of a Nobody"
1971	Nanny and the Professor	Aunt Agatha	Season 2 Episode 19: "The Balloon Ladies"
1971	Adam-12	Mrs. Sarah Pierce	Season 3 Episode 21: "Log 164: The Poachers"
1972	O'Hara, U.S. Treasury	Agnes Howett	Season 1 Episode 15: "Operation: Lady Luck"
1972	Getting Away from It All	Madeline Erickson	ABC Movie of the Week
1973	The Rookies	Mrs. Gleason	Season 2 Episode 13: "Another Beginning for Ben Fuller"
1974	Rhoda	Mrs. Fosner	Season 1 Episode 10: "The Honeymoon"
1974	Happy Days	Mrs. Harrison	Season 2 Episode 11: "Guess Who's Coming to Christmas"
1975	Happy Days	Lady	Season 2 Episode 20: "Fish and the Fins"
1975	Barney Miller	Mrs. Richline	Season 1 Episode 6: "The Stakeout"
1976	Sherlock Holmes in New York	Mrs. Martha Hudson	Television film
1977	CHiPs	Mrs. Downey	Season 1 Episode 6: "Baby Food"
1977	CHiPs	Mrs. Downey	Season 1 Episode 7: "Taking Its Toll"
1978	CHiPs	Margaret Downey	Season 1 Episode 16: "Vintage '54"
1979	Better Late Than Never	Marjorie Crane	Television film
1980	Barney Miller	Miss Stratton	Season 7 Episode 1: "Homicide: Part 1" (final appearance)
