= Dark Passage =

Dark Passage may refer to:

- Dark Passage (esports), Turkish esports team
- Dark Passage (novel), 1946 novel by David Goodis
  - Dark Passage (film), 1947 film
- "Dark Passage" (Generator Rex), a television episode
- Kingdom Keepers VI: Dark Passage, 2013 novel in the Kingdom Keepers series

== See also ==
- "A Dark Passage", a song by Blind Guardian from the 1998 album Nightfall in Middle-Earth
