= The Burglar (1957 film) =

1957 film by Paul Wendkos

- Theatrical release poster
- Directed by: Paul Wendkos
- Screenplay by: David Goodis
- Based on: The Burglar; 1953 novel by David Goodis
- Produced by: Louis W. Kellman
- Starring: Dan Duryea; Jayne Mansfield; Martha Vickers
- Cinematography: Don Malkames
- Edited by: Paul Wendkos; Herta Horn
- Music by: Sol Kaplan
- Production company: Columbia Pictures
- Distributed by: Columbia Pictures
- Release date: June 1957
- Running time: 90 minutes
- Country: United States
- Language: English
- Budget: $90,000 (estimated)

The Burglar is a 1957 American crime thriller film noir released by Columbia Pictures, based on the 1953 novel of the same name by David Goodis (who also wrote the script). The picture stars Dan Duryea in the title role and Jayne Mansfield. The movie was the first feature film directed by Paul Wendkos. John Facenda, a well-known Philadelphia sportscaster, is featured as a news anchor in one scene. Much of the film was shot on location in Philadelphia and Atlantic City.

== Plot ==
A wealthy Philadelphia man's property is left to "Sister Sara", the leader of a spiritualist group. Part of the bequest is a jewelled necklace.

To steal the jewels, Nat Harbin forms a gang that includes two men, Baylock and Dohmer, and Gladden, the daughter of his mentor. Gladden cases the estate, posing as a devotee of the spiritual group's work and eventually discovers where to find Sister Sara's safe.

During the robbery, Harbin parks near the mansion. Two officers approach the thieves' car while Harbin's two cohorts hide nearby. Harbin tells the policemen that he has had car trouble and is waiting until morning when he can get help. The policemen leave. Harbin then enters through the mansion's window, opens the safe and takes the necklace.

The thieves change their car's license plates and make their getaway. They are followed, however, by another car. At their hideout, Baylock and Dohmer want to fence the necklace and get their share of the money. However, Harbin says that they have to wait until news of the robbery dies down to increase the return they might get from a fence. One of the officers that talked to Harbin later makes an artist create a sketch of the suspected robber.

At the gang's hideaway, Harbin tells Baylock about his and Gladden's past. After an altercation with Dohmer, who lusts after Gladden, Harbin sends her off to Atlantic City to wait for him.

When Gladden takes the train to Atlantic City, she is followed by a man. The man eventually approaches her, and the two strike up a relationship. In Philadelphia, Harbin meets Della, a woman who invites him to her apartment. Having fallen asleep, Harbin awakens to find her gone. Stepping outside, he sees her with the same man who has been getting close to Gladden, and hears the two conspiring about getting the necklace.

Realizing that Gladden is in danger, Harbin drives toward Atlantic City with Baylock and Dohmer, but a toll booth operator recognizes him from the sketch and calls the authorities. The gang's car is later stopped by an officer for a routine traffic violation. Panicking, Dohmer shoots the policeman, who fires back and kills him. Harbin and Baylock abandon the car with Dohmer's body near Atlantic City, where they take refuge in a deserted shack. Knowing that the man he heard with Della has been pretending to be Gladden's boyfriend, Harbin calls her hotel room and tells her to send the boyfriend away so that he can see her. When the man comes downstairs to the lobby, Harbin realizes that he is Charlie, one of the officers who questioned him on the night of the burglary.

In Gladden's room, Harbin hides the necklace under her pillow after the two quarrel. When Harbin returns to the shack, Gladden finds the jewels and hides them in her musical jewel box. Charlie, meanwhile, calls Della and tells her to come to Atlantic City. At the shack, Charlie kills Baylock. He then offers to spare Harbin and even give him a cut of the money he will get if Harbin surrenders the necklace. Once Della arrives, Harbin reveals that he hid the jewels in Gladden's room, and Charlie heads out, leaving Della to hold a gun on Harbin. Harbin, though, walks out, hoping that Della will not be able to shoot him, which she does not.

Harbin calls Gladden at her room before Charlie can arrive. The two meet at Atlantic City's Steel Pier and retreat to an attraction to hide from Charlie, who finds them when Gladden drops the music box and it plays its tune. As the three sit together at a show, Harbin offers the necklace in return for Gladden's life. As Gladden leaves, Charlie shoots Harbin. The police arrive, having been alerted, and congratulate Charlie on stopping Harbin. Charlie claims that Harbin had thrown the jewels into the ocean, but Della has just arrived and is enraged that he seems to be cutting her out of their deal. When Charlie lunges at Della, the head detective punches him and finds the jewelry in his pocket. Charlie is handcuffed and led away.

== Cast ==
- Dan Duryea as Nathaniel "Nat" Harbin
- Jayne Mansfield as Gladden
- Martha Vickers as Della
- Peter Capell as Baylock
- Mickey Shaughnessy as Dohmer
- Stewart Bradley as Charlie
- John Facenda as Himself
- Wendell K. Phillips as Police Capt. Keebler
- Phoebe Mackay as Sister Sara, burglary victim
- Sam Elber as Gerald, burglar

== Remake ==
This film was remade in 1971 as The Burglars, directed by Henri Verneuil and starring Omar Sharif, Jean Paul Belmondo and Dyan Cannon.
