= Homicide (1949 film) =

1949 American comedy film directed by Felix Jacoves

- Theatrical release poster
- Directed by: Felix Jacoves
- Written by: William Sackheim
- Produced by: Saul Elkins
- Starring: Robert Douglas; Helen Westcott; Robert Alda; Monte Blue; Warren Douglas; John Harmon
- Cinematography: J. Peverell Marley
- Edited by: Thomas Reilly
- Music by: William Lava
- Production company: Warner Bros. Pictures
- Distributed by: Warner Bros. Pictures
- Release date: April 2, 1949
- Running time: 77 minutes
- Country: United States
- Language: English
- Budget: $227,000
- Box office: $506,000

Homicide is a 1949 American crime drama film directed by Felix Jacoves and written by William Sackheim. The film stars Robert Douglas, Helen Westcott, Robert Alda, Monte Blue, Warren Douglas and John Harmon. The film was released by Warner Bros. Pictures on April 2, 1949.

== Plot ==
Police Lt. Michael Landers suspects that a suicide at a local flop house is not what it appears to be. When his boss doesn't share his suspicions, Landers takes a leave of absence and travels to a desert spa town in order to investigate the death. At his hotel, he strikes up a romance with the pretty cigarette counter girl, Jo Ann.

== Cast ==
- Robert Douglas as Police Lt. Michael Landers
- Helen Westcott as Jo Ann Rice
- Robert Alda as Andy
- Monte Blue as Sheriff George
- Warren Douglas as Brad Clifton
- John Harmon as Pete Kimmel
- James Flavin as Det. Lt. Boylan
- Fred Stromsoe Jr. as Bellboy

== Reception ==
According to Warner Bros records the film earned $334,000 domestically and $172,000 foreign.
