= Two Guys from Milwaukee =

1946 film by David Butler

- Directed by: David Butler
- Written by: Charles Hoffman; I. A. L. Diamond
- Produced by: Alex Gottlieb
- Starring: Dennis Morgan; Jack Carson; Joan Leslie
- Cinematography: Arthur Edeson
- Edited by: Irene Morra
- Music by: Fredrick Hollander
- Production company: Warner Bros. Pictures
- Distributed by: Warner Bros. Pictures
- Release date: July 26, 1946
- Running time: 90 minutes
- Country: United States
- Language: English
- Box office: $2.5 million (US rentals)

Two Guys from Milwaukee (UK title: Royal Flush) is a 1946 American comedy film directed by David Butler, and starring Dennis Morgan, Jack Carson and Joan Leslie. It was distributed by Warner Bros. Pictures. The film is about a Balkan prince who wants to see for himself what America is really like. So he slips away from his entourage in New York City and pretends to be an average guy. The film closely mimics the style of Paramount's popular Road pictures, with Morgan in the Bing Crosby romantic straight role and Carson as the comedic Bob Hope sidekick.

Morgan, Carson, director David Butler, and writer I. A. L. Diamond reteamed for the 1948 follow up, Two Guys from Texas.

== Plot ==
Balkan Prince Henry arrives in New York City, determined to see how the "ordinary" man lives and works. Since his travel companions are unaware of his bold plan, he has to sneak away. He takes a taxi and gets to know the driver, Buzz Williams.

Henry makes up a background story for himself, claiming to be from Milwaukee, but it turns out the taxi driver was born and grew up there, which makes it harder for Henry to maintain his lie. Buzz invites Henry into his Brooklyn home, and teaches the prince all there is to know about real life. Henry is introduced to Buzz's sister, Nan Evans, and her young daughter, Peggy.

Unfortunately for Henry, there is a picture of him in the newspapers the next day, and it says he has been kidnapped. Henry assures Buzz that he will return in good time to stop his country from being converted to a republic. Buzz then helps Henry disguise himself by taking him to the barber shop where his girlfriend Connie Read works, and he shaves off his mustache.

That evening, Buzz and Henry plan to go on a double date with Connie and her friend Polly. Before that, Buzz asks Connie to show Henry around the area. During the day, Connie and Henry fall for each other, and Henry ultimately suggests they go somewhere and dine alone.

Henry arranges money to pay for dinner and Buzz's costs from his aide, Count Oswald. Then he and Connie have dinner, and afterwards meet up with Buzz, Polly and Oswald at the restaurant. They go to a movie together, and Buzz pays for his ticket with Balkan money he got from Oswald.

The movie theater manager becomes suspicious about the money and calls the FBI. They arrive and apprehend Henry at Connie's apartment. Henry is brought back to his hotel, where Oswald is waiting for him. The next day, Buzz's niece Peggy comes to beg Henry to stay away from Connie because Buzz is so jealous. She wants Henry to help get Buzz and Connie back together. Henry invites them all to his hotel suite to listen to a speech he is about to broadcast on the radio to the people of his country.

While they are in the suite, Connie tries to convince Buzz that they are not right for each other. Henry practices his speech and asks Buzz for help, which makes him talk about his love for the United States with great passion. They are unaware that the microphone is on, and Buzz's words are being broadcast. Since Buzz's speech is very good, he quickly becomes famous for his eloquence. Furthermore, the speech makes Connie fall back in love with him.

The people hearing Buzz's talk are inspired to vote to switch from a monarchy to a republic. Henry loses his title and privileges, and is free to stay in the US. He chooses to do that, and rushes off to Connie to ask for her hand in marriage. He is unaware that Buzz has done the same, and Connie has to decide which one of the completely different men she wants.

Ultimately, Connie chooses to marry Buzz, the man she has known for a long time and been in love with since she met him. Disappointed, Henry decides to go to Milwaukee, his pretended hometown, where he has been offered a job at a beer company. On the plane, he sees his favorite actress, Lauren Bacall, but is again discouraged when he sees that her husband, Humphrey Bogart, is sitting next to her.

== Cast ==
- Dennis Morgan as Prince Henry
- Joan Leslie as Connie Read
- Jack Carson as Buzz Williams
- Janis Paige as Polly
- S. Z. Sakall as Count Oswald
- Patti Brady as Peggy
- Rosemary DeCamp as Nan
- Tom D'Andrea as Happy
- John Ridgely as Mike Collins
- Pat McVey as Johnson
- Franklin Pangborn as Theatre Manager
- Francis Pierlot as Dr. Bauer
