= Malloch Building =

Apartment building in San Francisco, US

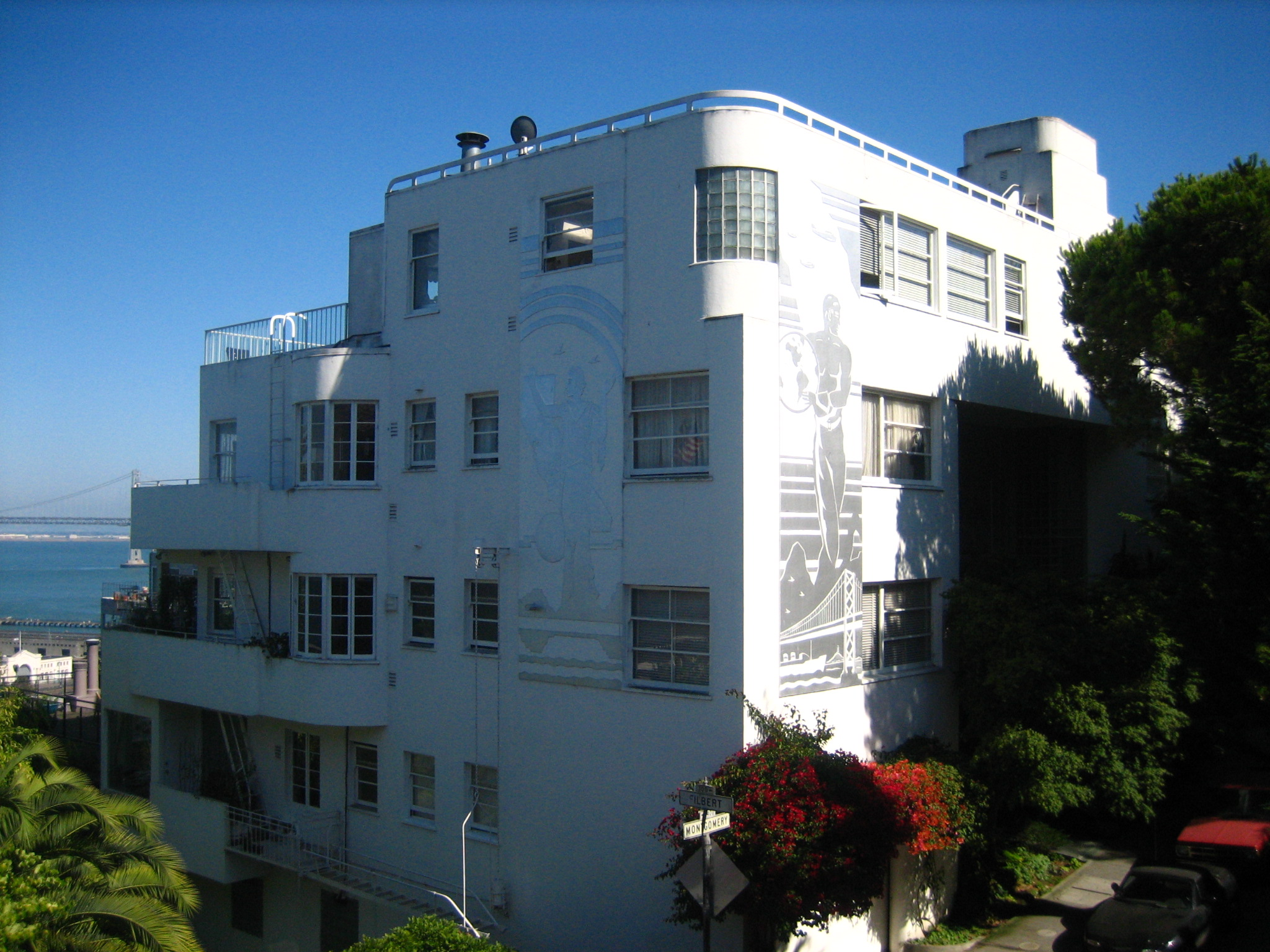

- Location within San Francisco Malloch Building (California) Malloch Building (the United States)
- Alternative names: Malloch Apartments

General information
- Type: Residential apartments
- Location: 1360 Montgomery Street; San Francisco, California
- Coordinates: 37.80186°N 122.40438°W
- Completed: 1937

Technical details
- Floor count: 6 residential 2 utility

Design and construction
- Architect: Irvin Goldstine
- Developer: John S. "Jack" Malloch; John Rolph Malloch
- Structural engineer: W.S. Ellison

The Malloch Building is a private residential apartment building on Telegraph Hill in San Francisco designed in the Streamline Moderne style and built in 1937. The building, one of the best examples of its type in San Francisco, is also known as Malloch Apartments, Malloch Apartment Building, and simply by its address: 1360 Montgomery Street. Some have called it the "Ocean-Liner House", though other Moderne buildings have also been known by that nickname.

Designed by Irvin Goldstine for contractor John "Jack" S. Malloch and his publisher son, John Rolph Malloch, the building was used as a filming location in 1947's Dark Passage, a noir work starring Humphrey Bogart and Lauren Bacall.

== Design and construction ==
The building was intended as a home for Jack Malloch and his son, John Rolph Malloch. Both men were partners in a father/son architectural firm based in San Francisco, and both wanted to live on Telegraph Hill with a view of the San Francisco Bay. They determined to build an apartment which would provide them with fine dwellings and also with income from the rental units it held. Irvin Goldstine (sometimes written Irving or Irvine) designed the building for them; he had recently graduated from l'École des Beaux-Arts but had not yet earned his architect's license, so he was not listed as the architect of record. Instead, the Mallochs were listed. Goldstine obtained his license in 1940, four years after he first sketched the Malloch Building.

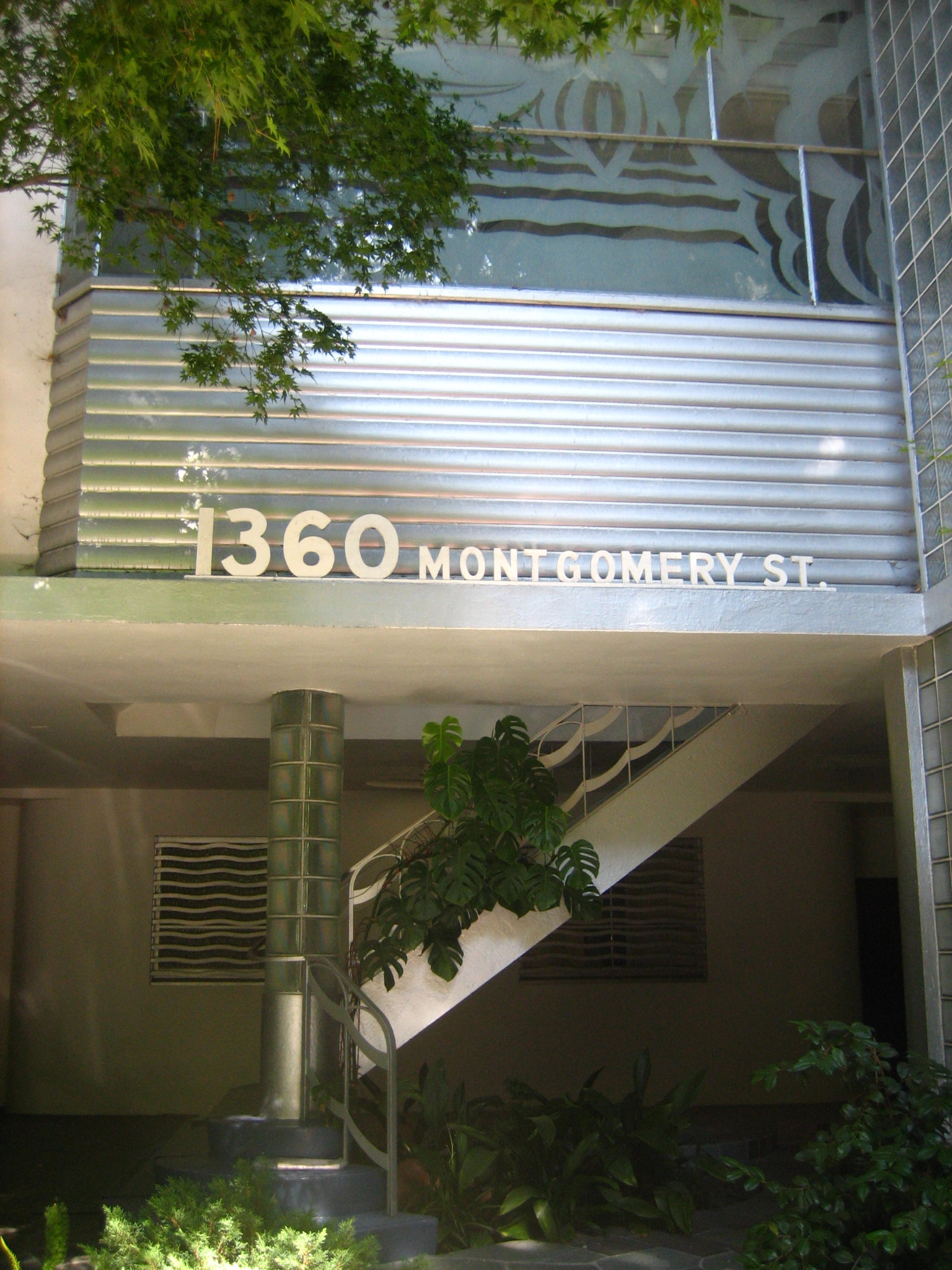
Open-air lobby showing curved stairs and glass brick

The building site is on a steep hill, so the street-level entrance at the upper edge of the property is not the lowest floor. Four stories of apartments start at the ground floor and go up, and two more floors consisting of a 10-car garage and a sub-basement storage space are below grade, jutting out to the east because of the slope. A manager's apartment was added in 1947 by extending steel beams from the garage and suspending a two-floor unit with steel cables. Structural engineer W.S. Ellison oversaw construction of the primarily wooden frame structure, built atop a foundation and two utility floors made of reinforced concrete to meet exacting state requirements for stability.

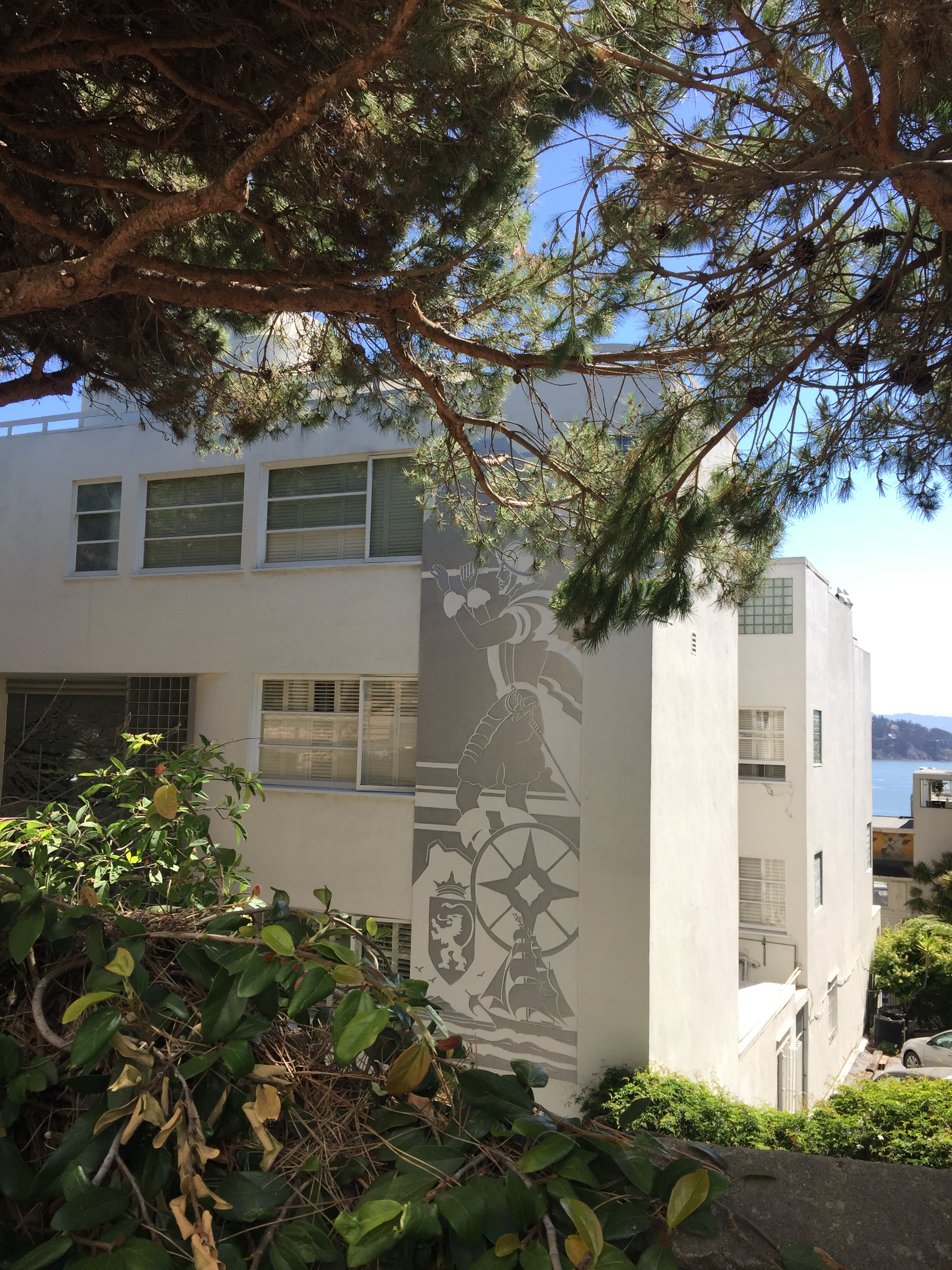
Mural on the exterior depicting a Spanish conquistador

Muralist Alfred Du Pont (also known as Dupont) was hired to design images to decorate the exterior. Du Pont produced two 40-foot (12 m) high silvery figures in sgraffito, or raised plaster, on the western facade of the building, and a third on the north side. Du Pont applied colored concrete to the exterior and carved it into shape. Flanking the main street entrance are two male figures. The image on the right facing left is a Spanish explorer with a telescope raised to one eye. The image on the left facing right is a bare-chested worker holding a globe, towering above the San Francisco–Oakland Bay Bridge, with sleek aircraft flying above and below him, and ships moving in the bay. The actual bridge can be seen from the house; it had been completed the previous year when the Malloch Building was under construction. Around the corner from the main entrance, the third silvery mural shows a robed woman, the spirit of California, standing in front of California represented as a map.

The building's elevator was designed and added to the foyer after the building was occupied. It is encased in a backlit glass brick shaft at one edge of the open-air lobby. Scalloped steel railings line the central staircase which is anchored by a glass brick column. Sandblasted designs are featured in glass plate windows above the entrance.

The interiors were streamlined as much as possible, without traditional touches such as baseboard moldings. Indirect lighting was used throughout. Curves were abundant, with rounded fireplaces topped with indirect lighting and a round dining room with floor-to-ceiling windows. Rounded balcony edges were set off by rounded bay windows. The bedrooms included circular dressing rooms with ample closet space. In some of the units, glass brick was used as partition material.

The city of San Francisco notified the Mallochs that they were in violation of a building code prohibiting more than three floors above a garage, because the building contained four floors of apartments above the garage. The Mallochs successfully argued that their structure stepped back in progression up the slope of Telegraph Hill so that the top floor was not directly above the garage. No part of the building was in violation of the code.

== Use ==
Before the building was completed, it was fully rented. In 1937, the two Malloch men moved into the two penthouse suites in the 12-unit apartment building, collecting rent from the other 10 tenants.

The Malloch Building was featured in the 1947 film noir work titled Dark Passage. In the film, Humphrey Bogart, playing an escaped prisoner, is invited by Lauren Bacall into her apartment unit, Number 10 on the third floor of the Malloch Building. In the apartment, Bogart hides out while he heals from plastic surgery, and plots to clear his name. Bogart wearily ascends the nearby Filbert Steps in one scene, on his way to the Malloch Building. Modern-day residents have been known to put a cutout of Bogart in the street-facing window of Number 10.

Owner/occupant John Rolph Malloch died in 1951 at the age of 39. In the early 1980s the building was converted from rental apartments to condominiums. The original plans had been lost to fire, so the renovating architects had to form new plans taken from measurements of the building.

A six-page writeup about the building appeared in Architect and Engineer in December 1937. The article listed the owners and the structural engineer, but did not name the architect. In the early 1980s, geologist and architectural historian Gray Brechin discovered that Irvin Goldstine had designed the building; Brechin subsequently interviewed Goldstine regarding his career. An article about the discovery was printed in Metro Magazine, a defunct San Francisco magazine. Until that time, the building was thought to be designed by the Mallochs.
