= Smart Girls Don't Talk =

1948 film by Richard L. Bare

- Directed by: Richard L. Bare
- Written by: William Sackheim
- Produced by: Saul Elkins
- Starring: Virginia Mayo; Bruce Bennett; Robert Hutton
- Cinematography: Ted McCord
- Edited by: Clarence Kolster
- Music by: William Lava; David Buttolph; Ray Noble
- Production company: Warner Bros. Pictures
- Distributed by: Warner Bros. Pictures
- Release date: October 9, 1948
- Running time: 81 minutes
- Country: United States
- Language: English

Smart Girls Don't Talk is a 1948 American crime film starring Virginia Mayo, Bruce Bennett and Robert Hutton, and directed by Richard L. Bare.

== Plot ==
When small-time hood Johnny Warjack and his gang hold up glitzy nightclub/illegal gambling den Club Bermuda he is recognized. Club owner Marty Fain offers to make good his patrons' losses, but orders his men to deal with Warjack.

Seedy gambler Nelson Clark tries to take advantage of Fain's generosity for $10,000, followed by beautiful young socialite Linda Vickers for $18,000 in diamonds. Fain does not believe either of them. Nonetheless, he deducts Clark's claimed loss from his outstanding debt, but then demands the remaining $13,000 be paid within a week.

Scoffing at Vickers’ imposture, Fain correctly sizes up her loss as just $600 worth of paste costume jewelry. Still, he offers to make good when she claims to have an insurance policy. He insists on seeing it to call her bluff, so they head for her apartment. The nightclub attendant says her car is parked far away, so Fain drives them in his. At her apartment, Vickers admits she lied. Fain is not surprised, having read of her financial troubles in the newspaper and sized her up correctly as a devious dame. She doesn't mind, and they appear to have a romantic encounter.

The next morning, Vickers is awoken by police Lieutenant McReady. Warjack was found murdered, and her car was spotted at the scene. Vickers has an alibi and sees no reason to divulge her suspicions. When she tells Fain of McReady's visit and mentions her excellent memory, Fain writes her a check for $18,000 to ensure her silence. Still mutually attracted in spite of everything, they begin seeing each other.

Vickers’ brother, "Doc", arrives in the city to take up a new medical job. He does not approve of his sister's boyfriend, but after being introduced to the club's attractive singer, Toni Peters, develops an eye for her.

Rebuked by her brother, and hounded by McReady, Vickers has a change of heart and returns Fain's check uncashed, then breaks up with him.

With Clark's week up, Fain sends his henchmen to collect from him. When they return empty-handed, Fain takes matters into his own. He sneaks into Clark's room and when Clark reaches for a gun shoots him first. Mortally wounded, Clark manages to get a shot off at the fleeing Fain, who staggers to his nightclub before falling unconscious. One of his men spots Doc in the club and presses him to take care of the wound. However, when Doc refuses to accept a large bribe to keep him from reporting it to the police, Fain sends his hoodlums to persuade him to change his mind. When Doc tries to run, one of them shoots him dead.

Vickers takes the news of her brother's murder hard. She suspects Fain, as does McReady. Even after learning from ballistics tests that Fain killed Clark but is unlikely her brother's slayer, she agrees to help McReady try to entrap him. Fain is suspicious when she asks him to take her back, especially since it is so soon after Doc's death.

Interrupting a mid-day dally with Fain at her apartment, Vickers abruptly leaves to spring McReady's trap. Luring Fain to Toni’s apartment, she gets him to confess to killing Clark and implicating his trigger-happy henchman.

Beginning to suspect Vickers of wheedling this information out of him, Fain finds a hidden wire recorder and turns it off. Unbeknownst to him, there is also a backup microphone with the police on the other end listening in. They are waiting when the threesome attempts to flee. Fain is ready to give up, but Doc's killer uses Vickers as a shield. Fain struggles with him, and both men are cut down in a hail of police gunfire.

McReady initially attempts to comfort Vickers, but she seeks to be left alone and leaves to walk home by herself. Telling his partner to go ahead without him, McReady then pursues and catches up to her, taking her by the elbow romantically. She does not resist.

== Cast ==
- Virginia Mayo as Linda Vickers
- Bruce Bennett as Marty Fain
- Robert Hutton as "Doc" Vickers
- Tom D'Andrea as Sparky Lynch
- Richard Rober as Lt. McReady
- Helen Westcott as Toni Peters
- Richard Benedict as Cliff Saunders
- Ben Welden as Nelson Clark
- Richard Walsh as Johnny Warjak
- Harry Hayden as ballistics expert
