= Doctrine of indivisibility =

The doctrine of indivisibility (or indivisibility doctrine) was a legal doctrine in United States copyright law, which held that a copyright was a single, indivisible right that its owner could only assign as a whole. The doctrine was founded upon the policy concern that a defendant alleged to have infringed a single work might find himself facing claims from multiple plaintiffs, all claiming copyright in that same work. Despite the indivisibility doctrine, a copyright holder could still effectively assign certain rights. The assignees of those rights were held to be "mere licensees."

This doctrine could yield a harsh result for an exclusive licensee in a work. If a third party infringed the work, the copyright holder had no motivation to file suit---the work was no longer marketable. So courts allowed exclusive licensees to compulsively join the copyright holder as a plaintiff in such suits. Non-exclusive licensees could not forcefully join copyright holders, on the theory that in those cases, the work was still marketable and the copyright holder therefore had an interest in protecting his rights.

The doctrine could also yield a harsh result where a magazine purchased the right of first publication from an author, but provided a copyright notice only for the magazine as a whole, not for the author. This would result in a forfeiture of any copyright protection and an injection of the work into the public domain. As detailed below, this harsh result was mostly abrogated by Goodis v. United Artists Television, Inc.

In the case Goodis v. United Artists Television, Inc., 425 F.2d 397, the United States Court of Appeals for the Second Circuit held that the doctrine of indivisibility could not operate to wholly deprive an author of his copyright when a "mere licensee" secured a copyright in a collective work but the author never secured a separate copyright on his own.

The doctrine of indivisibility was expressly eliminated in the Copyright Act of 1976. Assignees of rights in a copyrighted work now have standing to directly file suit against infringers. Because adequacy of a copyright notice is examined under the statue as it existed on the date that the work was first published, the doctrine of indivisibility remains potentially relevant for works published before January 1, 1978.

== See also ==
Mifflin v. R. H. White Company
