= Fred Stromsoe =

American actor and stuntman (1930–1994)

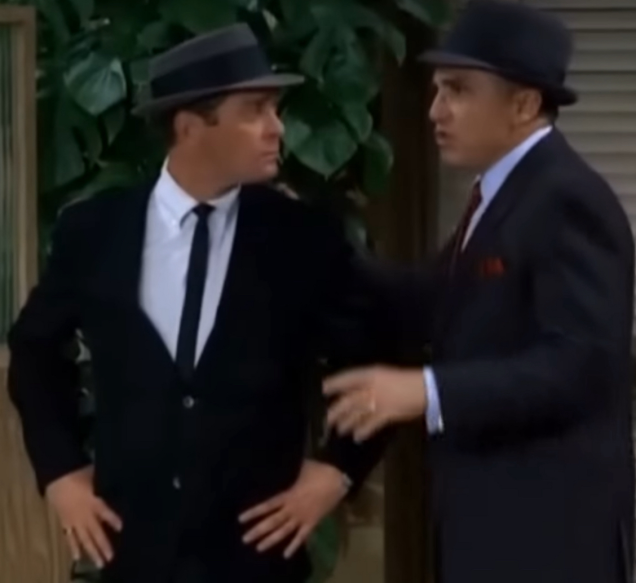
- Stromsoe (left) with Sheldon Leonard in The Lucy Show, 1967
- Born: June 15, 1930; Denver, Colorado, U.S.
- Died: September 30, 1994 (aged 64)
- Occupations: Actor; stuntman
- Years active: 1949–1991

Fred Stromsoe (June 15, 1930 – September 30, 1994) was an American actor and stuntman. He was best known for playing the recurring role of Officer Woods in the American police procedural television series Adam-12.

== Life and career ==
Stromsoe was born in Denver, Colorado. He began his career in 1949, appearing in the film Homicide. He stunt doubled for actors Martin Milner, Tab Hunter, Glenn Corbett, David Janssen, Efrem Zimbalist Jr., Barry Newman, John Agar and Edd Byrnes.

Later in his career, Stromsoe guest-starred in numerous television programs including Gunsmoke, 77 Sunset Strip, Voyage to the Bottom of the Sea, Sugarfoot, The Man from U.N.C.L.E., I Spy, Route 66, The Time Tunnel, The Wild Wild West, The Invaders and The Fugitive. He also appeared in numerous films including The Horn Blows at Midnight, G.I. Blues, No Time for Sergeants, The Good Guys and the Bad Guys, The Sea Chase, The McConnell Story, The Love Bug and The Wrecking Crew.

== Death ==
Stromsoe died on September 30, 1994 of emphysema, at the age of 64.
