= Night and Day (1946 film) =

1946 film directed by Michael Curtiz

- Original film poster
- Directed by: Michael Curtiz
- Written by: Charles Hoffman; Leo Townsend; William Bowers
- Produced by: Arthur Schwartz; Jack L. Warner (executive producer)
- Starring: Cary Grant; Alexis Smith; Monty Woolley; Mary Martin; Jane Wyman; Dorothy Malone; Eve Arden; Alan Hale
- Cinematography: J. Peverell Marley; William V. Skall
- Edited by: David Weisbart
- Music by: Ray Heindorf; Max Steiner; Milton Ager; Jack Yellen; Cole Porter (songs)
- Color process: Technicolor
- Production company: Warner Bros. Pictures
- Distributed by: Warner Bros. Pictures
- Release dates: July 26, 1946 (New York City, premiere); August 3, 1946 (US)
- Running time: 128 minutes
- Country: United States
- Language: English
- Budget: $4,445,000
- Box office: $7,418,000 (worldwide rentals)

Night and Day is a 1946 American musical film, a fictionalized account of the life of composer and songwriter Cole Porter. Starring Cary Grant as Porter, the film was directed by Michael Curtiz and produced by Arthur Schwartz, with Jack L. Warner as executive producer. The screenplay was written by Charles Hoffman, Leo Townsend, and William Bowers.

The music score by Ray Heindorf and Max Steiner was nominated for an Academy Award. The film features several of the best-known Porter songs, including the title song "Night and Day", "Begin the Beguine", and "My Heart Belongs to Daddy".

Alexis Smith plays Linda Lee Thomas, Porter's wife of 35 years. Monty Woolley and Mary Martin appear as themselves.

== Plot summary ==
Cole Porter is studying law at Yale University, at the encouragement of his grandfather. One of his law professors, Monty Woolley (playing himself), encourages his songwriting.

Porter abandons study of law and Woolley leaves Yale as well. Porter's songwriting is interrupted by French Foreign Legion service in the First World War, in which he is wounded. He resumes music after the war, and weds Linda, a longtime family friend. Their marriage suffers due to Porter's dedication to his songwriting, which leaves him little time for a personal life.

At the height of his career, after many successes, Porter suffers a serious accident while horseback riding, fracturing both his legs and permanently disabling him. Despite many operations, he cannot walk without assistance. In the end, he reunites with Linda, who had previously left him.

== Cast ==
- Cary Grant as Cole Porter
- Alexis Smith as Linda Lee Thomas Porter
- Monty Woolley as himself
- Ginny Simms as Carole Hill
- Jane Wyman as Gracie Harris
- Eve Arden as Gabrielle
- Victor Francen as Anatole Giron
- Alan Hale Sr. as Leon Dowling
- Dorothy Malone as Nancy
- Tom D'Andrea as Tommy
- Selena Royle as Kate Porter
- Donald Woods as Ward Blackburn
- Henry Stephenson as Omar Cole
- Paul Cavanagh as Bart McClelland
- Sig Ruman as Wilowski
- Mary Martin as herself
- Gordon Richards as Cochran (uncredited)
- Caren Marsh Doll as Customer (uncredited)

== Production ==
Jack Warner paid $300,000 for the rights to Cole Porter's best known songs, and viewed the film as a "big-budget extravaganza" that would celebrate Warner Bros. Pictures' twenty years in sound films. The scriptwriters knew that the film would need to be fictionalized, both because Porter lacked the "rags to riches" quality common to subjects of biographical films, and because he was gay (at the time, the Hays Code prohibited depictions of homosexuality in film).

Warner paid Grant $100,000 and bought out his contract at Columbia Pictures at a considerably greater sum. Grant and Curtiz clashed often, with much of the fighting over a script that Grant viewed as weak, with "lousy characterizations." Much of the script was rewritten at his behest. Grant sometimes refused to act in scenes that he felt were poorly written, and was critical of other aspects of production. He later recalled that Curtiz lost his temper so often that the director sometimes lost his train of thought.

Grant sings several of the songs, which made Night and Day the closest he came to making a musical after the end of his stage career. He was described by his biographer as a "competent though not a very expressive singer."

Production of the film was impeded by a 1945 strike of the Conference of Studio Workers, who represented the set builders for the film.

== Reception ==
In a review upon release of the film, Thomas Pyror of The New York Times called the film "a generally pleasant and musically exciting show." He praised the musical numbers and the performances by Grant and Woolley, but noted that the story strayed from historical fact, stating that it was a "thin and conventional scenario the scenarists concocted about the fabulous Mr. Porter."

At the 2004 debut of another film on Porter's life, De-Lovely, the Times called Night and Day "so-bad-it's-almost-good." The newspaper recounted that when Night and Day was being filmed, "Orson Welles cracked: 'What will they use for a climax? The only suspense is: will he or won't he accumulate $10 million?'"

William Bowers, who worked on the script, called the movie "an enormous success, but I still think it's the worst thing I've ever seen. And I was so embarrassed." He said Cole Porter loved the movie which confused Bowers until Oscar Hammerstein explained that Porter loved all of his songs in the movie. "'You don't think he heard that stuff that went on between his songs, do you?' And Oscar was absolutely right. The songs were done beautifully, and that's really the only thing that mattered in that silly picture."

== Musical numbers ==
1. "I'm in Love Again" – sung and danced by Jane Wyman
2. "Bulldog, Bulldog" – sung by Cary Grant and male chorus
3. "In the Still of the Night" – sung by Dorothy Malone (dubbed by Bobbie Canvin) and chorus
4. "Old Fashioned Garden" – sung by Cary Grant and Selena Royle
5. "You've Got That Thing" – sung by Paula Drew, Pat Clark and Jane Harker
6. "Let's Do It, Let's Fall in Love" – sung by Jane Wyman
7. "You Do Something to Me" – sung and danced by Jane Wyman and chorus
8. "I'm Unlucky at Gambling" – sung by Eve Arden
9. "Miss Otis Regrets" – sung by Monty Woolley (as himself)
10. "I Wonder What's Become of Sally" – sung by Ginny Simms
11. "What Is This Thing Called Love?" – sung by Ginny Simms
12. "I've Got You Under My Skin" – sung by Ginny Simms and danced by Adam Di Gatano and Jane Di Gatano
13. "Rosalie" – sung by chorus
14. "Night and Day" – sung by Bill Days
15. "Just One of Those Things" – sung by Ginny Simms and danced by Estelle Sloan with chorus
16. "You're the Top" – sung by Ginny Simms and Cary Grant
17. "I Get a Kick Out of You" – sung by Ginny Simms and danced by chorus
18. "Easy to Love" – sung by chorus
19. "My Heart Belongs to Daddy" – sung by Mary Martin (as herself, the original 1938 Broadway performer) and chorus
20. "Do I Love You?" – a few lines, by "rehearsing" background singer
21. "Don't Fence Me In" – a few lines, in short clip from 1944 movie Hollywood Canteen, sung by Roy Rogers
22. "Begin the Beguine" – sung by Carlos Ramírez and danced by George Zoritch and Milada Mladova with chorus
23. "Bulldog, Bulldog" (reprise) – sung by chorus
24. "Night and Day" (reprise) – sung by chorus

Additionally, a dance ensemble is shown rehearsing "Anything Goes", but there is no formal performance of the song as such.

== Box office ==
The film was a hit, earning theatrical rentals of $4,990,000 domestically and $2,428,000 in foreign markets.
