= Better Late Than Never (1979 film) =

- Genre: Comedy-drama
- Written by: John Carpenter; Greg Strangis
- Story by: Robert Stitzel
- Directed by: Richard Crenna
- Starring: Harold Gould; Strother Martin; Tyne Daly
- Music by: Charles Fox
- Country of origin: United States
- Original language: English

Production
- Executive producers: William Hogan; Greg Strangis
- Producer: Robert Birnbaum
- Production locations: Snoqualmie, Washington; Paramount Ranch - 2813 Cornell Road, Agoura, California
- Cinematography: Ronald W. Browne
- Editor: Jerry Dronsky
- Running time: 120 minutes
- Production company: Factor/Newland Productions

Original release
- Network: NBC
- Release: October 17, 1979

Better Late Than Never is a 1979 American TV film. It was written by John Carpenter and directed by Richard Crenna.

== Plot ==
Harry Landers (Harold Gould) resides in a retirement home in a quaint corner of Massachusetts. Strongly averse to the idea of being confined within the walls of this retirement facility, Landers likens himself to a bird stripped of its wings. Adding to his discontent, the hospice is under the strict and somewhat sadistic management of Miss Davis (Tyne Daly), a woman known for her harsh methods.

In contrast to the resigned acceptance of impending death by other residents in the home, Harry decides he will no longer tolerate the numerous injustices perpetrated by the director. He initiates a rebellion, rallying a colonel (Donald Pleasence), a former captain (George Gobel), and all the other elderly inhabitants of the hospice. Their collective message is a powerful one: that life remains precious in every moment, even as it approaches its end.

== Cast ==
- Harold Gould as Harry Landers
- Strother Martin as J D Ashcroft
- Tyne Daly as Ms Davis
- Harry Morgan as Mr Scott
- Marjorie Bennett as Marjorie Crane
- Victor Buono as Dr Zoltan Polos
- George Gobel as Captain Taylor
- Jeanette Nolan as Lavinia Leventhal
- Donald Pleasence as Colonel Riddle
- Larry Storch as Sheriff
- Tom Spratley as Tom
- Lou Jacobi as Milton Cohen
- Paula Trueman as Alke Elam
