= David Goodis =

American novelist (1917–1967)

- Goodis at an unknown date
- Born: March 2, 1917; Philadelphia, Pennsylvania, U.S.
- Died: January 7, 1967 (aged 49); Philadelphia, Pennsylvania, U.S.
- Occupations: Novelist, screenwriter
- Spouse: Elaine Astor (m. 1943–1946)
- Writing career
- Pen name: David Crewe, Logan Claybourne, Lance Kermit, others
- Period: 1939–1967
- Genres: Noir fiction, crime fiction

David Loeb Goodis (March 2, 1917 – January 7, 1967) was an American writer of crime fiction noted for his output of short stories and novels in the noir fiction genre. Born in Philadelphia, Goodis alternately resided there and in New York City and Hollywood during his professional years. According to critic Dennis Drabelle, "Despite his [university] education, a combination of ethnicity (Jewish) and temperament allowed him to empathize with outsiders: the working poor, the unjustly accused, fugitives, criminals."

== Biography ==
=== Early life ===
Goodis was born in Philadelphia, Pennsylvania, the oldest child of William Goodis and Mollie Halpern Goodis. William Goodis was a Russian-Jewish émigré born in 1882 who had arrived in America with his mother in 1890. David Goodis's mother, Mollie Halpern, was born in Pennsylvania also into a family of Russian-Jewish émigrés. In Philadelphia, Goodis's father co-owned a newspaper dealership and later went into the textile business as the William Goodis Company. A brother, Jerome, born in 1920, died of meningitis at age three. In 1922, another brother, Herbert, was born into the family.

Goodis attended Simon Gratz High School Mastery Charter and was engaged in student affairs, editing the school newspaper, serving as student council president, and participating in athletics as a member of both the track and swim teams. He also had the distinction of being chosen valedictorian for the graduating class of 1935, delivering a speech entitled "Youth Looks at Peace". As a college student at Temple University, he continued and expanded on the interests he had pursued as a high school student, contributing to the student newspaper as both writer and cartoonist. It was during this period that he purportedly tried his hand at novel writing with a book titled Ignited. The novel was never published, and no copy of it has been discovered. Goodis later claimed: "The title was prophetic. Eventually, I threw it into the furnace." Goodis graduated from Temple University in 1938 with a degree in journalism.

=== Pulp magazines ===
While working at an advertising agency, Goodis started writing his first published novel, Retreat from Oblivion. After it was published by Dutton in 1939, Goodis moved to New York City, where he wrote under several pseudonyms for pulp magazines, including Battle Birds, Daredevil Aces, Dime Mystery, Horror Stories, Terror Tales and Western Tales, sometimes churning out 10,000 words a day. The first pulp story published under his own name, titled "Mistress of the White Slave King", appeared in Gangland Detective Stories (November 1939). Over a five-year period, according to some sources, he produced 5 million words for the pulp magazines. While the quantity of his output far eclipses that of his predecessors Dashiell Hammett and Raymond Chandler, unlike theirs, the vast majority of his pulp stories have never been reprinted.

=== Radio and screenplays ===
During the 1940s, Goodis scripted radio adventure serials, including Hop Harrigan, House of Mystery, and Superman. Novels he wrote during the early 1940s were rejected by publishers, but in 1942 he spent some time in Hollywood as one of the screenwriters on Universal's Destination Unknown. His big break came in 1946 when his novel Dark Passage was serialized in The Saturday Evening Post, published by Julian Messner, and filmed for Warner Bros. with Humphrey Bogart and Lauren Bacall heading the cast. Delmer Daves directed what is regarded as a classic film noir, and a first edition of the 1946 hardcover is valued at more than $800.

Arriving in Hollywood, Goodis signed a six-year contract with Warner Brothers, working on story treatments and scripts. In 1947, Goodis wrote the script for The Unfaithful, a remake of William Wyler's The Letter. Some of his scripts were never produced, such as Of Missing Persons and an adaptation of Raymond Chandler's The Lady in the Lake. Working with director Delmer Daves, he wrote a screen treatment for Up Till Now, a film which Daves described as "giving people a look at themselves and their [American] heritage". This film, too, was never made, but Goodis used some of its elements in his 1954 novel The Blonde on the Street Corner.

Goodis is also credited with writing the screenplay to The Burglar, a 1957 film noir directed by Paul Wendkos that was based on his 1953 novel published by Lion Books. It was the only solely authored screenplay by him to be produced as a movie. It was remade in 1971 by Henri Verneuil as the French-Italian film Le Casse (The Burglars) starring Omar Sharif and Jean-Paul Belmondo.

=== Marriage and divorce ===
Until the late 2000s, it was widely believed that Goodis never married. His friend Harold "Dutch" Silver said Goodis never spoke of a wife, and no wife was mentioned in Goodis's obituary. Attorney correspondence also repeatedly stated that Goodis never married.

However, research by Larry Withers and Louis Boxer has produced a marriage license for Goodis and Elaine Astor. It shows that they were married on October 7, 1943, by Rabbi Jacob Samuel Robins, Ph.D., at Ohev Shalom Congregation, 525 South Fairfax Avenue, Los Angeles. According to a divorce decree found in the attic of Philadelphia's City Hall, Astor received a divorce on January 18, 1946.

Withers is Astor's son by a later marriage. He learned about her marriage to Goodis only after his mother had died in 1986 from a stroke.

=== Return to Philadelphia ===
In 1950, Goodis returned to Philadelphia, where he lived with his parents and his schizophrenic brother Herbert. At night, he prowled the underside of Philadelphia, hanging out in nightclubs and seedy bars, a milieu he depicted in his fiction. Cassidy's Girl (1951) sold over a million copies, and he continued to write for paperback publishers, notably Gold Medal. There was a renewed interest in his works when François Truffaut filmed his 1956 novel Down There as the acclaimed Shoot the Piano Player (1960).

Goodis died at 11:30 pm on January 7, 1967, at Albert Einstein Medical Center, Northern Division, in Philadelphia, not far from his home. He was 49. His death certificate lists "cerebral vascular accident," meaning a stroke, as the cause of death. Days earlier, Goodis had been beaten while resisting a robbery. Some have attributed his death to his injuries. (It is also said that he died while shoveling snow.) He was buried in Roosevelt Memorial Park in Pennsylvania.

== The Fugitive and the lawsuit ==
In 1963, ABC television began airing The Fugitive, the fictional story of Richard Kimble, a doctor wrongfully convicted of murdering his wife. In the plot, Kimble subsequently escapes and begins a long search for the "one-armed man", the person he believes to be the real killer.

Goodis stated that The Fugitive was based on his novel Dark Passage. In 1965, he sued United Artists-TV and ABC for $500,000, alleging copyright infringement. His cousin's law firm, Goodis, Greenfield, Narin and Mann, represented him, and several groups supported him, including the Authors League of America, the Dramatists Guild, and the American Book Publishers Association. Coudert Brothers represented United Artists and ABC.

During a deposition on December 9, 1966, Goodis stated that The Saturday Evening Post had serialized Dark Passage, a fact that would become critical to the case. Goodis died one month later of a heart attack, after which the lawsuit continued to wind its way through the courts.

The dispute did not so much concern whether the theme of Dark Passage had been used, but whether the book was in the public domain. In a victory for United Artists and ABC, the District Court held that Goodis had, in effect, "donated his work to the public domain" when he published it in The Saturday Evening Post without using a copyright notice that listed his name.

The Goodis estate appealed. In 1970, the United States Court of Appeals for the Second Circuit reversed the lower court's decision and remanded the case for trial. The decision is reported at Goodis v. United Artists Television, Inc., 425 F.2d 397 (2nd Cir. 1970). The court wrote, "We unanimously conclude that where a magazine has purchased the right of first publication under circumstances which show that the author has no intention to donate his work to the public, copyright notice in the magazine's name is sufficient to obtain a valid copyright on behalf of the beneficial owner, the author or proprietor." (425 F.2d 398-399)

By then, Goodis's main beneficiary, his brother Herbert, was also dead. So in 1972, the Goodis estate agreed that the case now had only "nuisance value" and accepted $12,000 to settle the matter. Despite the significant difference between the initial claim and the final monetary settlement, the case is still regarded as a landmark decision in intellectual property rights and copyright law.

== Influence ==
After his death, his work went out of print in the United States, but he remained a popular favorite in France. In 1987, Black Lizard began to reissue Goodis titles. In 2007, Hard Case Crime published a new edition of The Wounded and the Slain for the first time in more than 50 years. Also in 2007, Street of No Return and Nightfall were re-published by Millipede Press. His novel Down There was reprinted as part of the Library of America's American Noir of the 1950s collection. In March 2012, the Library of America published a volume of Goodis's novels under the title David Goodis: Five Noir Novels of the 1940s and 50s.

Goodis has influenced contemporary crime fiction writers, notably Duane Swierczynski and Ken Bruen. Although Goodis's novels were occasionally adapted by Hollywood, it was mainly French filmmakers (François Truffaut, René Clément, Jean-Jacques Beineix) who were interested in his work. A character in Jean-Luc Godard's 1966 film Made in U.S.A. was named after Goodis. However, in Godard's 1972 film Tout va bien, the character Jacques (played by Yves Montand), a filmmaker, says he moved into making commercials as more "honest" work when, after May 1968, he was asked to direct a film based on a Goodis detective novel and decided he couldn't see himself making something so stupid.

== Bibliography ==
- Retreat from Oblivion (1939)
- Dark Passage (1946)
- Behold This Woman (1947)
- Nightfall (1947) aka Convicted, The Dark Chase
- Of Missing Persons (1950)
- Cassidy's Girl (1951)
- Of Tender Sin (1952)
- Street of the Lost (1952)
- The Burglar (1953)
- The Moon in the Gutter (1953)
- Black Friday (1954)
- The Blonde on the Street Corner (1954)
- Street of No Return (1954)
- The Wounded and the Slain (1955)
- Down There (1956) aka Shoot the Piano Player
- Fire in the Flesh (1957)
- Night Squad (1961)
- Somebody's Done For (1967) aka The Raving Beauty

== Filmography ==
- The Unfaithful – d. Vincent Sherman (1947). Goodis co-wrote the screenplay
- Dark Passage – d. Delmer Daves (1947)
- Sección desaparecidos – d. Pierre Chenal (1956) from Of Missing Persons
- Nightfall – d. Jacques Tourneur (1957)
- The Burglar – d. Paul Wendkos (1956). Goodis wrote the screenplay from his own novel
- Shoot the Piano Player (Tirez sur le pianiste) – d. François Truffaut (1960) from Down There
- Bourbon Street Beat – episode: "False Identity" (broadcast May 23, 1960)
- The Alfred Hitchcock Hour – episode: "An Out for Oscar" (broadcast April 5, 1963)
- The Burglars (Le Casse) – d. Henri Verneuil (1972) from The Burglar
- And Hope to Die (original title La Course du lièvre à travers les champs) – d. René Clément (1972) from Black Friday and Raving Beauty
- The Moon in the Gutter (La Lune dans le Caniveau) – d. Jean-Jacques Beineix (1983)
- Rue barbare – d. Gilles Behat (1983) from Street of the Lost
- Descente aux enfers – d. Francis Girod (1986) from The Wounded and the Slain
- Street of No Return – d. Samuel Fuller (1989)
- Professional Man (1995) d. Steven Soderbergh Adapted by Howard A. Rodman from the short story 'Professional Man' published in Manhunt Magazine Oct. 1953. Part of the second series of Showtime's Fallen Angels (aka Perfect Crimes).

A film adaptation of Cassidy's Girl was being developed by director Edward Holub in 2004.

A filmography of works based on Goodis's novels is appended to Eddie Duggan's 1988 article Life's a Bitch: Paranoia and Sexuality in the Novels of David Goodis.
