= Tom D'Andrea =

American actor (1909–1998)

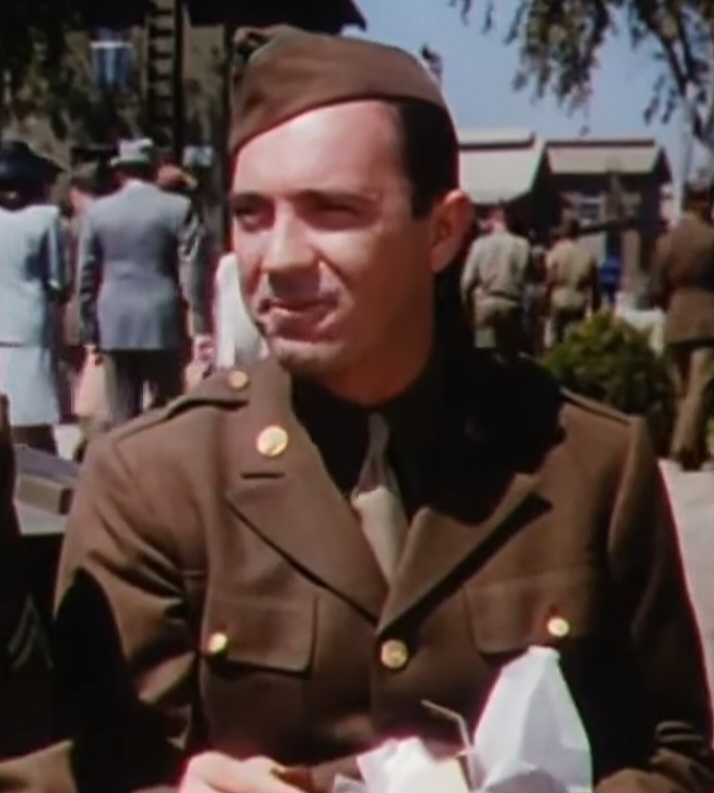
- D'Andrea in This Is the Army (1943)
- Born: May 15, 1909; Chicago, Illinois, U.S.
- Died: May 14, 1998 (aged 88); Port Charlotte, Florida, U.S.
- Occupation: Actor
- Spouse: Helen Pender

Thomas J. D'Andrea (May 15, 1909 – May 14, 1998) was an American actor in films and on television.

== Early years ==
D'Andrea was born May 15, 1909, in Chicago, Illinois. He graduated from high school with honors and excelled in basketball.

== Career ==
D'Andrea's first job was at the Chicago Public Library, after which he worked in publicity at the Sherman House Hotel in Chicago. Contacts with entertainers at the hotel led to an opportunity to work in Hollywood. After moving there in 1934, he became a publicist for Betty Grable, Gene Autry, Mae Clarke and Jackie Coogan.

He began writing scripts in 1937, creating lines for Ben Bernie, Jack Benny, Eddie Cantor and Olsen and Johnson and later continued in television, writing for Cantor and Donald O'Connor on their shows.

In 1941, D'Andrea was drafted into the Army Air Corps. He was assigned to write a Gracie Fields program after being stationed at Camp Roberts, California. Reading lines at a rehearsal, Fields decided to have him read the lines in the show. He was assigned to the Overseas Radio Unit in 1943, and he began performing comedy in addition to writing.

While at Ciro's Restaurant on Sunset Strip D’Andrea attracted a Warner Bros.' executive's attention, resulting in a role in This is the Army, with Ronald Reagan. In 1946, the studio signed him to a long-term contract.

He went on to roles in Pride of the Marines with John Garfield, Night and Day with Cary Grant, Never Say Goodbye, Silver River with Errol Flynn, and Dark Passage with Humphrey Bogart.

D'Andrea was notable for his performances in film noir, especially in Dark Passage (1947), To the Victor (1948), Smart Girls Don't Talk (1948), Flaxy Martin (1949), and Tension (1950).

His last film was A House Is Not a Home with Shelley Winters in 1964.

After working in the film Kill the Umpire, with William Bendix in 1950, D'Andrea was chosen to play the part of Gillis, Riley's talkative neighbor in the long running television series, The Life of Riley starring Bendix. Other TV shows he appeared in were Death Valley Days with Ronald Reagan, Playhouse 90, the Hallmark Hall of Fame, and Summer Playhouse.

On television, D'Andrea also portrayed Biff the bartender in Dante and acted as himself in The Soldiers.

He appeared in the films This Is the Army, Pride of the Marines, Night and Day, Two Guys from Milwaukee, Never Say Goodbye, Humoresque, Love and Learn, Dark Passage, To the Victor, Silver River, Smart Girls Don't Talk, Fighter Squadron, Flaxy Martin, Tension, Kill the Umpire, The Next Voice You Hear..., Little Egypt and A House Is Not a Home.

He appeared in the television series The Life of Riley, The Bill Dana Show, My Living Doll, The Farmer's Daughter, The Double Life of Henry Phyfe, The Beverly Hillbillies, The Andy Griffith Show, The Dick Van Dyke Show, Green Acres and That Girl, among others.

== Personal life ==
D'Andrea's first marriage ended in divorce. They had a son, Tommy. He next married model Helen Pender. He was raised Catholic and was a member of the Masquers Club in Hollywood, The Screen Actors Guild, and American Federation of Television and Radio Artists.

== Death ==
D'Andrea died the day before his 89th birthday on May 14, 1998, in Port Charlotte, Florida, at South Port Square.

== Filmography ==
Year	Title	Role	Notes
1942	Across the Pacific	Toy Seller	Uncredited
1943	This Is the Army	Tommy	
1945	Pride of the Marines	Tom	
1946	Night and Day	Tommy	
1946	Two Guys from Milwaukee	Happy	
1946	Never Say Goodbye	Jack Gordon	
1946	Humoresque	Phil Boray	
1947	Love and Learn	Wells	
1947	Dark Passage	Cabby – Sam	
1948	To the Victor	Gus Franklin	
1948	Silver River	'Pistol' Porter	
1948	Smart Girls Don't Talk	Sparky Lynch	
1948	Fighter Squadron	M / Sgt. James F. Dolan	
1949	Flaxy Martin	Sam Malko	
1950	Tension	Freddie	
1950	Kill the Umpire	Roscoe Snooker	
1950	The Next Voice You Hear...	Harry 'Hap' Magee	
1951	Little Egypt	Max	
1964	A House Is Not a Home	Gabe	
1967	Divorce American Style	Mildred's Irate Husband	Voice, Uncredited
