= Tension (film) =

1949 film by John Berry

- Theatrical release poster
- Directed by: John Berry
- Screenplay by: Allen Rivkin
- Story by: John D. Klorer
- Produced by: Robert Sisk
- Starring: Richard Basehart; Audrey Totter; Cyd Charisse; Barry Sullivan
- Narrated by: Barry Sullivan
- Cinematography: Harry Stradling
- Edited by: Albert Akst
- Music by: André Previn
- Production company: Metro-Goldwyn-Mayer
- Distributed by: Metro-Goldwyn-Mayer
- Release dates: November 25, 1949 (United States); January 11, 1950 (New York City)
- Running time: 91 minutes
- Country: United States
- Language: English
- Budget: $682,000
- Box office: $776,000

Tension is a 1949 American crime film noir directed by John Berry, and written by Allen Rivkin, based on a story written by John D. Klorer. It stars Richard Basehart, Audrey Totter, Cyd Charisse and Barry Sullivan.

The film features an early score from composer Andre Previn. Some of his themes and cues were reused in later MGM productions such as Cat on a Hot Tin Roof (1958 film), Designing Woman and North by Northwest.

The careers of the director and supporting actor Lloyd Gough later suffered from blacklisting.

== Plot ==
Police Lieutenant Collier Bonnabel of the homicide division explains to the camera that he solved cases by applying pressure to suspects until they snap under the tension. He then cites a murder case involving Warren Quimby.

In flashback, the bespectacled Quimby, night manager of a drugstore, is married to Claire, who lives with him above the store and is openly unfaithful to him. She leaves him for rich Barney Deager. Quimby goes to Deager's beachfront house to try to get his wife back, but she wants nothing to do with him. When Quimby persists, Deager beats him up.

He tells his sympathetic employee Freddie what happened. Freddie remarks that if it had been him, he would've killed the man. Humiliated, Quimby constructs a new identity as cosmetics salesman Paul Sothern. He buys contact lenses and flashier clothes, and he rents an apartment. His neighbor is the beautiful, sweet Mary Chanler, whom he starts dating.

Quimby goes to Deager's house with the intent of killing him while he sleeps, but realizes Claire isn't worth it. Deager awakens and Quimby mocks him, implying that Claire, who is not there, is being unfaithful to him as well.

Later that evening, Claire surprises Quimby by returning to him. She tells him that Deager has been shot to death. Bonnabel and his partner Lieutenant Gonsales arrive to question them. They know that Claire left the murder scene before they were called. She says that she only went to Deager's place as a day guest to swim regularly and that she and her husband had been Deager's friends for two or three years. Quimby plays along.

Bonnabel takes Claire on a date, apparently attracted to her, while telling her that the police had a long file on her dating back to San Diego.

Mary goes to the Bureau of Missing Persons, concerned about Sothern's disappearance. She brings a photograph of him. It is obvious that Sothern and Quimby are the same man. However, police do not have the murder weapon.

The police arrest Quimby. Under questioning, he tells them his story, which they do not believe. They demand to know the location of the gun and Quimby insists that they ask Claire.

Bonnabel visits Claire and tells her that they had to release her husband owing to insufficient evidence. He says that the gun is the vital clue that they need to convict Quimby.

Claire retrieves the gun from its hiding place under a rock near the beach house and plants it in Sothern's apartment. Mary and then Quimby arrive, followed very shortly by the police. Claire "finds" the gun under a chair cushion, but then Bonnabel explains that all the furnishings had been replaced, meaning any gun from before would have been gone, and hence Claire has incriminated herself. Claire is arrested.

== Cast ==
- Richard Basehart as Warren Quimby, aka Paul Sothern
- Audrey Totter as Claire Quimby
- Cyd Charisse as Mary Chanler
- Barry Sullivan as Police Lt. Collier Bonnabel
- Lloyd Gough as Barney Deager
- Tom D'Andrea as Freddie, the counter man at Coast to Coast drugstore
- William Conrad as Police Lt. Edgar "Blackie" Gonsales
- Tito Renaldo as Narco, Deager's houseboy

== Production ==
Tension was an MGM "silver anniversary" release, and it reflected a change in the direction of the studio, reflecting a change in emphasis initiated by studio executive Dore Schary, who sought to emphasize realistic films alongside the studio's longtime production of romances and homespun family dramas. The aim was to cater to changing audience tastes, which Schary felt had become more jaded after the war. At the time production began on Tension in the spring of 1949, the studio was still run by Louis B. Mayer, who hated Schary's changes. Schary replaced Mayer in 1950. Tension has been described as "an intriguing signpost on MGM's journey to a changed market."

According to MGM records, the film earned $506,000 in the U.S. and Canada and $270,000 in other markets, resulting in a loss of $229,000.

== Reception ==
Contemporary reviewers praised the performances, but some criticized the pacing of the film and the lack of surprise. New York Times film critic Bosley Crowther pointed to the detective character saying at the beginning that his strategy was to bring suspects to a breaking point, and said the film was "a most grueling assault, in a long and exhausting exhibition, upon the audience's breaking point." Crowther said the film "rambles from one thing to another in a most unsuspenseful way and ends with a shattering revelation which you can see coming a half-hour in advance."

Time magazine described the film as "slackly written and strewn with loose ends," and said "the melodrama is robbed of much of its inherent tension by overacting."

Baltimore Sun reviewer Gilbert Kanour also observed that the film was not a mystery though it was billed that way, since "there is no mystery about anything that occurs," but he praised the film for avoiding conventional tropes, such as "frantic chases" and gunplay.

Archer Winsten wrote in the New York Post that the film was “fair-to-good,” that it was "an ordinary murder melodrama that improves its normal rating a little on the basis of better-than-average casting, writing and production." He wrote that the film “explains very carefully what you’re going to get even before the title and credits have reached the screen. Detective Barry Sullivan gives a little lecture on his work and how he finds out who commits a murder…You can follow this picture easily while carrying on a whispered conversation with your girl."

The Philadelphia Inquirer found the film “as terse as its one-word-title….The conclusion comes with sudden, shocking violence and, fortunately, since so many promising dramas are dissipated by far-fetched denouements, is completely plausible. Basehart’s performance is steady, likable and believable throughout….Miss Trotter is properly vicious and mean…and Cyd Charisse, altogether charming as the girl innocently involved is the sordid affair.”

Reviewing the film for the motion picture trade, Harrison’s Reports called the film “Good melodramatic entertainment, well written, directed, and acted. There is an undercurrent of excitement from the very beginning, and it grips one’s attention throughout because of the interesting plot developments….It is a little too strong for the family trade, but adult audiences that enjoy pictures of this type should find it very much to their liking.”

Writing in the New York Daily News at its New York release in January 1950, critic Wanda Hale gave the film two and a half of a possible four stars. She praised the performances and said that they elevated the film, which she described as a "slow-paced mystery." She called Tension "an unimportant film yet is easy to take and it will be just as easily forgotten."

San Francisco Examiner's reviewer praised the film, saying "there's smart suspense throughout," and that Basehart's performance was "believable beyond belief."

== Legacy ==
In the years since the film came out, Tension has been praised by film historians and reviewers, with Totter and Basehart singled out for praise.

Writing in 1998, when Tension was screened in San Francisco as part of a series honoring blacklisted directors, San Francisco Examiner critic Walter Addiego wrote: "They aren't making 'em anymore like this 1949 melodrama by John Berry, and that's too bad." Addiego wrote that what "sticks with you about the film is what a classic, prize-winning sap the Basehart character is, how pathetic and ill-considered are his dreams of domestic bliss, and how easily he's able to shift into a new and quite different identity. All in all, a good example of noirish post-war disillusionment — and it has Cyd Charisse and William Conrad to boot."

In Ten Movies at a Time: A 350-Film Journey Through Hollywood and America 1930-1970, published in 2017, author John DiLeo writes that Tension is one of the last films of this genre to examine the "corroding aftermath of postwar optimism." He calls the film a "pretty good noir" and as "one of the movies in which someone can't go through with a murder, but the intended victim winds up dead anyway." He singles out Totter's performance for praise, calling her the "premiere femme fatale of film noir," an "actress able to inhabit ever lower reaches of immorality and soullessness." When she rejects an unwanted advance by saying "drift," DiLeo writes, "she almost makes you want to be a masochist, just so you can hang out with her."

Reviewing a DVD release of the film in 2007, Chicago Tribune writer Susan King called Tension "addictive fun thanks to noir veteran Audrey Totter's flawless performance."

In the 2010 anthology Historical Dictionary of Film Noir, film historian Andrew Spicer cites Basehart's portrayal of Robespierre in Reign of Terror (1949), and says that the actor is equally effective as "the archetypal little man and hen-pecked suburbanite who is nevertheless capable of assuming a new identity and contemplating murder.

The 2013 book Film Noir FAQ calls Tension "a very competent, entertaining movie," and writes that Totter "burns up the screen."
