= Helen Westcott =

American actress (1928–1998)

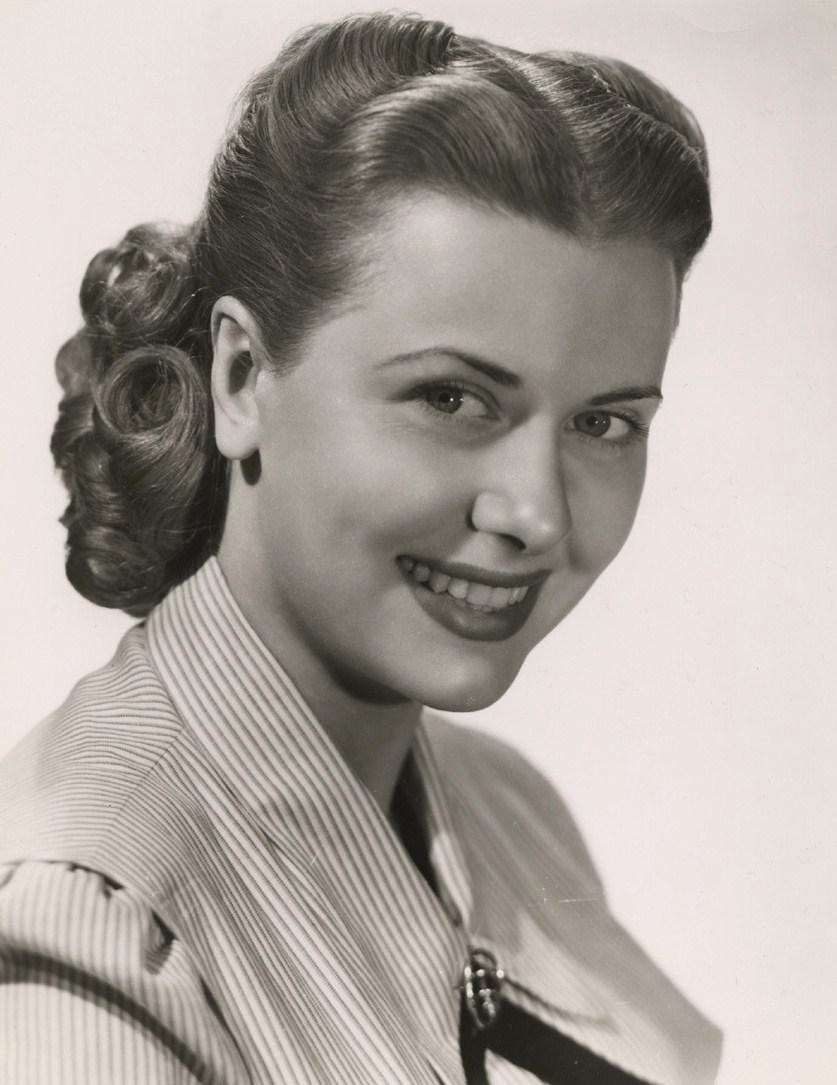
- Westcott in 1950
- Born: Myrthas Helen Hickman; January 1, 1928; Los Angeles, California, U.S.
- Died: March 17, 1998 (aged 70); Edmonds, Washington, U.S.
- Occupation: Actress
- Years active: 1934–1977
- Spouses: Don Gordon (m. 1948; div. 1953) Joseph Johnson-Smith (m. 1975; died 1981)
- Children: 1
- Father: Gordon Westcott

Helen Westcott (born Myrthas Helen Hickman, January 1, 1928 – March 17, 1998) was an American stage and screen actress. A former child actress, she is best known for her work in The Gunfighter (1950).

== Early years ==
Westcott was born on New Year's Day, 1928. She was the daughter of singer Hazel McArthur and Warner Bros. studio actor Gordon Westcott. Her father died from a polo accident when she was seven years old.

When she was two years old, Westcott appeared in vaudeville with her mother. At age seven, she began a nine-year run playing the daughter on stage in a production of The Drunkard in Los Angeles.

Westcott attended Los Angeles City College.

== Film ==
When Westcott was 4 years old, she appeared in a series of short films. At 5, she appeared in the full-length Thunder Over Texas. She appeared opposite Gregory Peck in the western classic The Gunfighter released in 1950. She was also known in part for her role in Charles Lamont's 1953 comedy horror film Abbott and Costello Meet Dr. Jekyll and Mr. Hyde.

== Television ==
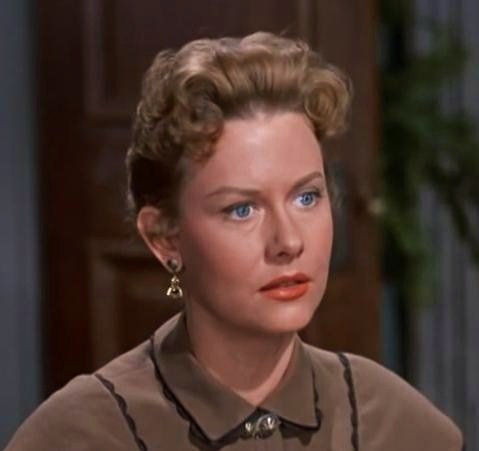
Westcott in the 1960 Bonanza episode "The Fear Merchants"

Westcott moved from the big screen to television roles in the late 1950s. In 1958 she appeared on Perry Mason as murderer Marcia Greeley in "The Case of the Haunted Husband." She also made guest appearances on Bonanza, The Twilight Zone and Wanted Dead Or Alive.

== Later years ==
Westcott also appeared on the stage later in her career, as well as in films including Anthony Mann's God's Little Acre in 1958.

== Personal life ==
Westcott wed actor Don Gordon on February 18, 1948. They had a daughter, Jennifer Kaye (born 1950). They were divorced in 1953.

== Death ==
Westcott died of cancer in Edmonds, Washington on March 17, 1998. Her body was cremated.

== Filmography ==
Film
Year	Title	Role	Notes
1934	Thunder Over Texas	Betty 'Tiny' Norton	
1935	The Affair of Susan	Engaged Girl on Stoop	Uncredited
1935	A Midsummer Night's Dream	Cobweb	
1936	Without Orders	Little Girl	Uncredited
1937	Maid of Salem	Little Girl	Uncredited
1941	Henry Aldrich for President	Student	Uncredited
1948	13 Lead Soldiers	Cynthia Stedman	
1948	Smart Girls Don't Talk	Toni Peters	
1948	Adventures of Don Juan	Lady Diana	
1949	Alaska Patrol	Mary Lynn	
1949	Flaxy Martin	Peggy Farrar	
1949	Homicide	Jo Ann Rice	
1949	Mr. Belvedere Goes to College	Tri Gam Coed	Uncredited
1949	One Last Fling	Annie Mae Hunter	
1949	The Girl from Jones Beach	Miss Brooks	
1949	Whirlpool	Simms' Secretary	Uncredited
1949	Dancing in the Dark	June	Uncredited
1950	Backfire	Miss Haller – Receptionist at Mortuary	Uncredited
1950	Three Came Home	Woman Prisoner	Uncredited
1950	The Gunfighter	Peggy Walsh	
1951	Take Care of My Little Girl	Merry Coombs	
1951	The Secret of Convict Lake	Susan Haggerty	
1952	Phone Call from a Stranger	Jane Trask	
1952	Return of the Texan	Averill Murray	
1952	With a Song in My Heart	Jennifer March	
1952	Loan Shark	Martha Haines	
1952	Battles of Chief Pontiac	Winifred Lancaster	
1953	Cow Country	Linda Garnet	
1953	The Charge at Feather River	Anne McKeever	
1953	Gun Belt	Arlene Reach	
1953	Abbott and Costello Meet Dr. Jekyll and Mr. Hyde	Vicky Edwards	
1956	Hot Blood	Velma	
1956	I Killed Wild Bill Hickok	Belle Longtree	
1958	God's Little Acre	Rosamund	
1958	The Last Hurrah	Mrs. McCluskey	Uncredited
1958	Invisible Avenger	Tara O'Neill	
1958	Monster on the Campus	Nurse Molly Riordan	
1959	Day of the Outlaw	Vivian	
1960	Studs Lonigan	Miss Julia Miller	
1960	Cimarron	Miss Kuye – Schoolteacher	Uncredited
1963	The Alfred Hitchcock Hour	Mrs. Helen Fletcher	Season 1 Episode 22: "Diagnosis Danger" (credited as Hellena Westcott)
1964	The Twilight Zone	Lilian Pope	Season 5 Episode 14: "You Drive"
1970	Pieces of Dreams	Mrs. Straub	
1970	I Love My Wife	Mrs. Burrows	

Source: The Encyclopedia of Fantastic Film: Ali Baba to Zombies
