= Dark Passage (novel) =

1946 crime novel by David Goodis

- First edition (publ. Julian Messner)
- Author: David Goodis
- Genre: Crime novel
- Publisher: Julian Messner
- Publication date: January 1, 1946

Dark Passage (1946) is a crime novel by David Goodis. It was the basis for the 1947 film noir of the same name.

== Plot ==
Vincent Parry, wrongly convicted of murdering his wife, escapes from prison and is taken in by Irene Jansen, a wealthy socialite and artist with an interest in his case who becomes bent on clearing his name. Helped by a friendly cabbie, Parry gets a new face from a plastic surgeon, thereby enabling him to dodge the authorities and find his wife's real killer. He has difficulty staying hidden, in part because Madge Rapf, the spiteful woman whose testimony sent him to prison, and who has an unhealthy interest in Irene, keeps stopping by.

== Film and television ==
- Dark Passage was adapted for film in 1947, with a screenplay by Delmer Daves, who also directed. It reunited Bogart and Bacall onscreen, and co-starred Agnes Moorehead and Bruce Bennett.
- Tales from the Crypt featured an episode loosely based on the film, entitled "You, Murderer".

== Legal issues ==
The copyright status of Dark Passage was the subject of a dispute between Goodis' estate and United Artists Television. The Goodis estate claimed that the UA series The Fugitive constituted copyright infringement. United Artists claimed that the work had fallen into the public domain under the terms of the Copyright Act of 1909 because it had been first published as a serial in The Saturday Evening Post, and that Goodis never obtained a separate copyright on the work. In Goodis v. United Artists Television, Inc., 425 F.2d 397, the United States Court of Appeals for the Second Circuit limited the so-called "Doctrine of indivisibility", explaining that it was a judicial doctrine related only to standing, and should not operate to completely deprive a claimant of his copyright.

== Current edition ==
The novel is currently available in a Library of America edition, David Goodis: Five Noir Novels of the 1940s and '50s, edited by Robert Polito, ISBN 1598531484, ISBN 978-1598531480.
