= The Burglars =

1971 film by Henri Verneuil

- Theatrical poster
- Directed by: Henri Verneuil
- Screenplay by: Henri Verneuil; Vahé Katcha
- Based on: The Burglar by David Goodis
- Produced by: Henri Verneuil
- Starring: Jean-Paul Belmondo; Omar Sharif
- Cinematography: Claude Renoir
- Edited by: Pierre Gillette
- Music by: Ennio Morricone
- Production companies: Columbia Films; Vides Cinematografica
- Distributed by: Columbia Pictures
- Release dates: 27 October 1971 (France); 21 December 1971 (Italy)
- Running time: 120 minutes
- Countries: France; Italy
- Language: French
- Budget: $2.7 million

The Burglars (French: Le casse) is a 1971 crime film directed by Henri Verneuil and starring Jean-Paul Belmondo and Omar Sharif. It is based on the 1953 novel by David Goodis and revolves around a team of four burglars chased by a corrupt policeman in Athens.

The movie is known for its car chase by Rémy Julienne's crew through the streets of Athens, and Belmondo's rolling fall from a construction truck down a steep, rocky hillside. The movie was shot twice, once in French and once in English, by the same cast.

== Plot ==
In Athens, Azad, Ralph, Renzi, and Helen execute a heist, pilfering a suitcase of emeralds from a wealthy Greek citizen, M. Tasco, during his absence. Breaking into the house, they crack the safe and abscond with the jewels. Detective Abel Zacharia notices the burglars' car outside the residence. Azad engages in small talk with the detective, posing as a stranded salesman. Zacharia departs, seemingly fooled.

Intent on leaving the country aboard a merchant ship, the thieves encounter a setback – the ship requires five days of repairs. Opting to bide their time, they stash the loot and disperse. Zacharia resurfaces with plans to claim the emeralds for himself. Azad develops feelings for Lena.

Zacharia pinpoints the thieves and frames Ralph for the crime, resulting in Renzi's death and Ralph's arrest. Azad narrowly evades the police with Lena, only to discover her collusion with Zacharia.

Azad and Zacharia clash in the cargo hold of the ship, leading to Zacharia being buried beneath tons of wheat. Azad eludes the police but has to leave behind the jewels buried under the wheat with Zacharia, underscoring the theme that crime does not pay.

== Cast ==
- Jean-Paul Belmondo as Azad
- Omar Sharif as Abel Zacharia
- Dyan Cannon as Lena Gripp
- Robert Hossein as Ralph
- Nicole Calfan as Helene
- Myriam Feune de Colombi as Isabelle Tasco (as Myriam Colombi)
- Raoul Delfosse as Le gardien de la villa Tasco
- José Luis de Vilallonga as Tasco
- Renato Salvatori as Renzi

== Production ==
Following The Sicilian Clan (1969), which was the third-highest grossing film in France that year, director Henri Verneuil planned another crime film. He based The Burglars on David Goodis' 1953 novel The Burglar.

Columbia Film partnered with Franco Cristaldi's company Vides to have the film 80% funded by the two Paris-based production companies: Columbia Films and Les Productions Henri Venreuil and 20% funded by the Rome-based Vides Cinematografica. The film was originally going to be filmed in Hamburg, with Verneuil opting to film in Greece instead. After a 1967 coup, Greece become a military dictatorship. Miltos Stavrou offered funding, but The Burglars did not feature Greek financial participation, as the director did not want another level of constraint from a third production country. He did take advantage of Greek government's support by using a trolley car for five days and a cargo ship for free for two of the more complex scenes in the film. Filming took place between February 18, and May 26, 1971 in Athens and Corfu.

== Release ==
The Burglars was released as Le Casse (lit. 'The Heist') in France on October 27, 1971. The authors of French Thrillers of the 1970s: Volume I, Crime Films (2026) described it as a "substantial success in France" with 4,410,000 spectators making it the sixth highest grossing film in 1971 in France.

It was released around the world and did well in the box office in Europe, Japan and South America. It was released in Italy on December 21, 1971 as Gli scassinatori where it performed particularly well. It was released in the United States in a version what was shot in English with Belmondo's voice being dubbed with some slightly different edits than the original French version. It was released in New York on June 14, 1972 and in the United Kingdom in September 7, 1972.

== Reception ==
The Los Angeles Times said "the scenery is lovely, Belmondo is fun to watch even in a flat, silly part like this" but that it was "finally an uninteresting and uninvolving movie" because "it has no reality except as a movie".

The New York Times called it "yet another international caper film... that does nothing very well and almost everything in excess" in which the director would "fill up a great deal of film time with a device rather than with an action".

Time Out said the film "suffers an overdose of sunshine and multi-national production values to emerge as just another glossy heist."
