= Flaxy Martin =

1949 film by Richard L. Bare

- Theatrical release poster
- Directed by: Richard L. Bare
- Screenplay by: David Lang
- Produced by: Saul Elkins
- Starring: Virginia Mayo; Zachary Scott; Dorothy Malone
- Cinematography: Carl Guthrie
- Edited by: Frank Magee
- Music by: William Lava
- Distributed by: Warner Bros. Pictures
- Release date: February 15, 1949 (United States)
- Running time: 86 minutes
- Country: United States
- Language: English

Flaxy Martin is a 1949 American film noir starring Virginia Mayo, with Zachary Scott and Dorothy Malone in principal support. Elisha Cook Jr. and Douglas Kennedy appear in featured roles. The crime thriller was directed by Richard L. Bare based on a story written by David Lang.

The film tells of mob lawyer Walter Colby, whose involvement with a crime syndicate and a femme fatale gets him in trouble.

== Plot ==
A murder occurs, and a witness tells the police that she will never forget the killer’s face. Mob attorney Walter Colby is called by crime boss Hap Richie in the middle of the night to arrange bail for his hood Caesar. After doing so Colby tells his girlfriend, showgirl Flaxy Martin, that he wants to quit the organization and become respectable. She pooh-poohs the idea, telling him that he does not have enough money to do so, or afford her.

She would know, as she is two-timing him with Hap.

Meanwhile, Hap arranges through Flaxy for a perjurer, Peggy Farrar, to testify on behalf of Caesar, clearing him of the crime. Afterward, Peggy seeks to blackmail Hap for $10,000 to maintain her silence.

Outraged at the double cross, Flaxy loudly assails Peggy at her hotel apartment, drawing the attention of its desk clerk. Later, Caesar silently shows up and kills her, leaving Flaxy accused of the crime.

She goes to Colby for help, who comes up with a plan to clear her by confessing to be the murderer himself. With absolutely no evidence connecting him to the crime, he is confident of his acquittal. All goes well during the trial until an obvious perjurer takes the stand, again arranged by Hap, clearly with the acquiescence at least of Flaxy. Colby is convicted on his testimony and sentenced to hard time.

Before he is transferred to prison, he is visited by Sam Malko, a former client who feels he owes Colby a good turn. Sam tells him that Caesar has been getting drunk and bragging about how Colby was convicted instead of him. Colby’s suspicions towards Flaxy begin to mount.

En route to the 20 years awaiting him, Colby slugs his guard and jumps off a train in the countryside. Injured, he passes out in front of motorist Nora Carson, who takes him home and nurses him. She proves inexplicably attracted to him, in spite of his self centeredness and repeated lack of gratitude. A statewide manhunt seeks his every trace, which he and Nora elude.

He returns to the city and seeks Sam‘s help, leaving Nora behind as he arranges a rendezvous with Caesar. When he gets there he finds Caesar dead, and once again ends up at gunpoint with Caesar’s hood Roper. The two have a violent showdown on a rooftop, with Colby forcing his pursuer over the edge to his death.

He then heads for Flaxy’s apartment for a confrontation. When Hap arrives she pulls a gun on both men, seeking to disappear with $40,000 of Hap’s money and leave the pair of rivals hanging. Colby tells her she can’t shoot both men at once, and whomever she doesn’t will get her. Colby flicks off the lights and she shoots wildly at both, killing Hap. Colby calls the police, who come and arrest her.

Arriving back at Sam’s with the stolen $40,000 he insists he’s going to go on the lam with Nora. She refuses, saying she doesn’t want to live always looking over her shoulder, which is not a good enough life for him either. She leaves to take a bus back home instead. Sam counsels reason and tells Colby he is making a big mistake. Colby relents and calls in a tip to the police to pick Nora up at the depot if they want to capture Colby. He is there at the station, ready to turn himself in, when she arrives.

== Cast ==
- Virginia Mayo as Flaxy Martin
- Zachary Scott as Walter "Walt" Colby
- Dorothy Malone as Nora Carson
- Tom D'Andrea as Sam Malko
- Helen Westcott as Peggy Farrar
- Douglas Kennedy as Hap Richie
- Elisha Cook Jr. as Roper
- Douglas Fowley as Max, Detective
- Monte Blue as Joe, Detective
- Jack Overman as Caesar
- Max Wagner as Charles McMahon

== Reception ==
Allmovie.com critic Hal Erickson lauded the film director, writing, "Director Richard L. Bare had only recently moved up from the "Joe McDoakes" comedy shorts to features when he guided Flaxy Martin with skill and aplomb."
