= Abbott and Costello Meet Dr. Jekyll and Mr. Hyde =

1953 American film directed by Charles Lamont

- Theatrical release poster by Reynold Brown
- Directed by: Charles Lamont
- Screenplay by: Lee Loeb; John Grant
- Story by: Sid Fields; Grant Garett
- Based on: inspired by Strange Case of Dr Jekyll and Mr Hyde (1886 novella) by Robert Louis Stevenson
- Produced by: Howard Christie
- Starring: Bud Abbott; Lou Costello; Boris Karloff
- Cinematography: George Robinson
- Edited by: Russell Schoengarth
- Production company: Universal-International
- Distributed by: Universal Pictures
- Release date: August 12, 1953 (Los Angeles)
- Running time: 76 minutes
- Country: United States
- Language: English
- Budget: $724,805
- Box office: $1.2 million (US & Canada rentals)

Abbott and Costello Meet Dr. Jekyll and Mr. Hyde is a 1953 American horror comedy film starring the comedy team of Abbott and Costello, co-starring Boris Karloff, and directed by Charles Lamont.

Inspired by the 1886 novella Strange Case of Dr. Jekyll and Mr. Hyde by Robert Louis Stevenson, the film follows the story of two American police officers visiting Victorian London who become involved in the hunt for a monster responsible for a series of murders.

== Plot ==
A series of horrific murders has terrorized Victorian London and baffled police.

While returning home from a pub, newspaper reporter Bruce Adams finds one murder victim, a prominent doctor. The next day, two American policemen, Slim and Tubby, who are studying London police methods, respond to brawl at a women's suffrage rally in Hyde Park. Reporter Adams, young suffragette Vicky Edwards, Slim, and Tubby are all caught up in the fray and wind up in jail. Vicky's guardian, Dr. Henry Jekyll, bails Vicky and Adams out, while Tubby and Slim are kicked off the police force. Unknown to anyone, Dr. Jekyll has developed a serum which transforms him into Mr. Hyde—the "monster" who is responsible for the recent murders. Dr. Jekyll is secretly in love with Vicky, and is angered by the mutual attraction between Vicky and Bruce. He injects himself to transform once again into Hyde with the intent of murdering Bruce.

Meanwhile, Tubby and Slim realize that if they capture the monster they will be reinstated on the police force. Walking down a street at night, Tubby spots Hyde and the boys trail him into the music hall where Vicky is performing and Adams is visiting. A chase ensues, and Tubby manages to trap Hyde inside a cell in a wax museum. But before Tubby can bring the police inspector, Adams and Slim to the scene, the monster has reverted to the respected Dr. Jekyll. Tubby is once again rebuked by the police inspector, but the "good" doctor asks Slim and Tubby to escort him to his home. While Slim and Tubby snoop around Jekyll's home, Tubby drinks a potion which transforms him into a large mouse. Slim and Tubby bring this extraordinary news to the inspector, but the inspector refuses to believe them.

Vicky announces to Jekyll her intent to marry Adams, but Jekyll does not share her enthusiasm and transforms into Hyde (without an injection) and attacks her. Adams, Slim and Tubby save her in the nick of time, but Hyde escapes. During the struggle, Jekyll's serum needle falls into a couch cushion, which Tubby accidentally falls onto, transforming him into a Hyde-like monster. Another madcap chase ensues, this time with Adams chasing Jekyll's monster and Slim pursuing Tubby's monster, who they each believe is Jekyll. Reports of the monster seemingly being in multiple places at once frustrate and confuse the London police.

Adams' chase ends up back at Jekyll's home, where Hyde falls to his death from an upstairs window, then transforms back into his true identity. Meanwhile, Slim brings Tubby, who is still in monster form, to the inspector's office. Tubby bites the inspector and four officers, then reverts to his true self. Before Slim and Tubby can be reprimanded, the inspector and the officers transform into monsters. Slim and Tubby dash through a wall and out of police headquarters to escape.

== Cast ==
- Bud Abbott as Slim
- Lou Costello as Tubby
- Boris Karloff as Dr. Henry Jekyll (also incorrectly credited as Mr. Hyde)
- Craig Stevens as Bruce Adams
- Helen Westcott as Vicky Edwards
- Reginald Denny as Inspector
- John Dierkes as Batley
- Eddie Parker as Mr. Hyde (uncredited)

== Production ==
Abbott and Costello Meet Dr. Jekyll and Mr. Hyde was filmed between January 26 and February 20, 1953. It received an "X" rating in Britain because of the scenes with Mr. Hyde. Karloff did not play Mr. Hyde once the transformation was complete; Hyde was played by stuntman Eddie Parker, who was uncredited. Similarly, after Costello transformed, his stunt double, Vic Parks, played the Costello version of Hyde.

== Reception ==
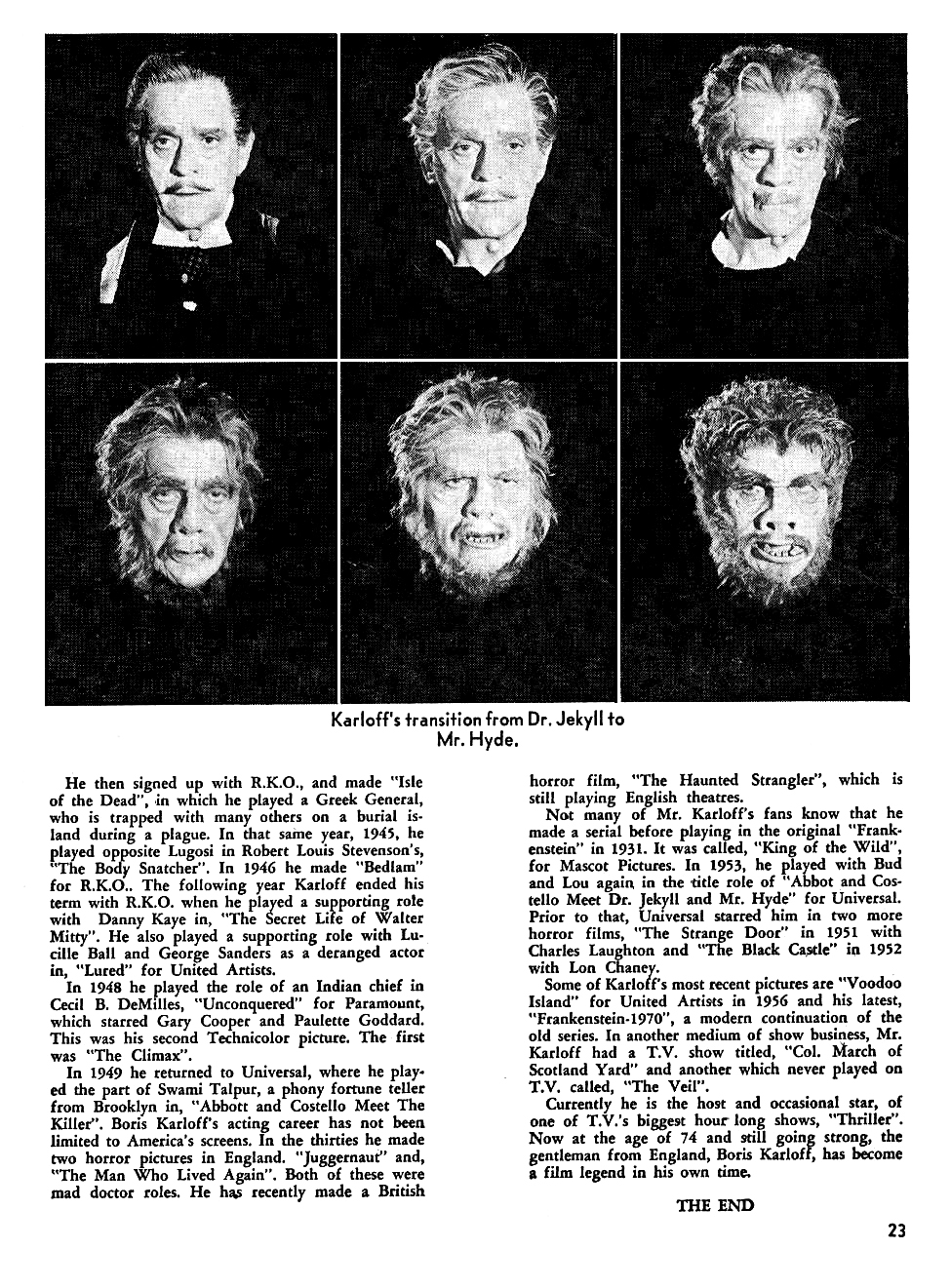
1963 magazine article depicting Dr. Jekyll's transformation into Mr. Hyde.

Contemporaneous reviewers gave the film good marks. Film Daily reported, "If the audience reaction at a sneak preview can be taken as a criterion, then Universal-International has another big treat for the Abbott and Costello fans." The Los Angeles Times referred tongue-in-cheek to the liberties the script took with the original story: "If Robert Louis Stevenson is turning over in his grave, it's probably only so he can get in a more comfortable position for a belly laugh." On Rotten Tomatoes, however, the film's grades are lower. It has an approval rating of 63% based on reviews from 8 critics, with an average rating of 5.86/10.

== Home media ==
The film has been released three times on DVD, on The Best of Abbott and Costello Volume Four, on October 4, 2005; again on October 28, 2008, as part of Abbott and Costello: The Complete Universal Pictures Collection; and in the Abbott and Costello Meet the Monsters Collection in 2015.

The film was released on Blu-ray as part of Abbott & Costello: The Complete Universal Pictures Collection on November 19, 2019.
