= To the Victor =

1948 film by Delmer Daves

- Directed by: Delmer Daves
- Written by: Richard Brooks
- Produced by: Jerry Wald
- Starring: Dennis Morgan; Viveca Lindfors; Victor Francen; Bruce Bennett; Dorothy Malone; Tom D'Andrea
- Cinematography: Robert Burks
- Edited by: Folmar Blangsted
- Music by: David Buttolph
- Production company: Warner Bros. Pictures
- Distributed by: Warner Bros. Pictures
- Release date: April 16, 1948
- Running time: 100 minutes
- Country: United States
- Language: English

To the Victor is a 1948 American drama film directed by Delmer Daves and starring Dennis Morgan, Viveca Lindfors and Victor Francen.

== Plot ==
American black-marketeer Paul Taggart falls in love with Nazi collaborator Jacques Lestrac's wife Christine Lund in post-World War II Paris.

== Cast ==
- Dennis Morgan as Paul Taggart
- Viveca Lindfors as Christine Lund Lestrac
- Victor Francen as Police Inspector Beauvais
- Eduardo Ciannelli as Firago
- Anthony Caruso as Nikki
- Tom D'Andrea as Gus Franklin
- Konstantin Shayne as Pablo
- William Conrad as Farnsworth
- Dorothy Malone as Miriam
- Jean De Briac as Lurcat
- Joseph Buloff as Bolyanov
- Henry Rowland as Hermann Zinzer
- John Banner as Jacques Lestrac
- Luis van Rooten as Geran
- Bruce Bennett as Henderson
- Clyde Cook as Bartender
- George Davis as Waiter
- Marcelle Corday as Elise
- Douglas Kennedy as Steve

== Bibliography ==
- Dick, Bernard F. The President’s Ladies: Jane Wyman and Nancy Davis. Univ. Press of Mississippi, 2014.
