= Silver River (film) =

1948 film by Raoul Walsh

- Theatrical poster
- Directed by: Raoul Walsh
- Written by: Harriet Frank, Jr.
- Based on: story by Stephen Longstreet
- Produced by: Owen Crump; Jack L. Warner
- Starring: Errol Flynn; Ann Sheridan; Thomas Mitchell
- Cinematography: Sidney Hickox
- Edited by: Alan Crosland Jr.
- Music by: Max Steiner
- Production company: Warner Bros. Pictures
- Distributed by: Warner Bros. Pictures
- Release date: May 18, 1948
- Running time: 110 minutes
- Country: United States
- Language: English
- Budget: $3,204,000
- Box office: $3,484,000

Silver River is a 1948 American Western film directed by Raoul Walsh and starring Errol Flynn, Ann Sheridan and Thomas Mitchell. The film is based on a Stephen Longstreet story that was turned into a novel. It was produced and distributed by Warner Bros. Pictures.

== Plot ==
During the American Civil War, Union Army Captain Mike McComb is cashiered from the army when he disobeys orders in order to prevent the Confederates from stealing the one million dollars he is guarding by burning the money. After being publicly humiliated by the townspeople, he and his friend 'Pistol' Porter confiscate gambling equipment and set out to Silver City, Nevada, to open a saloon and gambling hall. On his way to St. Joseph, Mike meets Georgia Moore, a beautiful, serious woman who runs the Silver River Mine with her husband, Stanley, and is currently hiring all the available wagons to transport the necessary mining equipment.

McComb wins ownership of the wagons in a poker game, much to Georgia's anger. Although he allows her to travel with him, she is unamused by McComb's playful behavior and soon abandons him. Once in Silver City, McComb, in a short time, builds the most successful saloon of the area. He hires John Plato Beck, an alcoholic but good-hearted man, as his lawyer. Meanwhile, Georgia is worried when she finds out Stanley has bought the wagons from McComb in exchange for 6,000 shares in the mine. This is only worsened when it turns out that Stanley does not have the money to finish his smelter and turns to McComb, who demands a one-third interest in the mine. As he builds his empire, McComb opens a town bank.

Georgia is not pleased when McComb usurps a visit by President Ulysses S. Grant. Encouraged by the President, McComb plans on extending his empire up to and including Black Rock Range. Although he is aware of the dangerous Shoshone Indians in that area, he assigns the pliable Stanley to realize his plans. When Plato makes him feel guilty, McComb warns Georgia about the danger her husband is in, but it turns out that they are too late: Stanley has been killed by the Indians.

After the funeral, Georgia briefly visits San Francisco and is romanced by McComb upon her return. During a formal dinner party to launch their new mansion, Plato throws a tantrum while drunk and breaks up the party with accusations against McComb. The townspeople start to lose their faith in McComb and withdraw their money from his bank. To worsen matters, the other owners try to corner the silver market. Georgia begs McComb to reopen the mines, and when he refuses, she leaves him. Soon after, McComb is forced to file for bankruptcy. Meanwhile, Plato runs for the United States Senate and in front of a crowd is killed by his rival, Banjo Sweeney. McComb convinces the townspeople to avenge Plato's death. However, when Sweeney is about to be killed by the mob, McComb stops them and convinces them to allow Sweeney to stand trial. He promises to make Silver City a better place, and Georgia, impressed with McComb's new attitude, reunites with him.

== Cast ==
- Errol Flynn as Michael J. 'Mike' McComb
- Ann Sheridan as Georgia Moore
- Thomas Mitchell as John Plato Beck
- Bruce Bennett as Stanley Moore
- Tom D'Andrea as 'Pistol' Porter
- Barton MacLane as 'Banjo' Sweeney
- Monte Blue as 'Buck' Chevigee
- Jonathan Hale as Major Spencer
- Al Bridge as Slade
- Arthur Space as Major Ross
- Robert J. Anderson as a Boy (uncredited)
- Joseph Crehan as President U.S. Grant (uncredited)
- Richard Alexander as Henchman (uncredited)
- Leo White as Barber (uncredited)

== Production ==
=== Development ===
The film began as an original story for the screen by Stephen Longstreet, who had written Stallion Road. Longstreet said he got the historical aspects of the story from his grandfather Stephen Longstreet, a cousin of General James Longstreet.

It was bought by Warner Bros, who announced in December 1946 that they would make it as a vehicle for Humphrey Bogart with Owen Crump to produce. Warners hired Longstreet to turn his story into a screenplay.

Before the film was made, Longstreet received an offer to have his story published as a novel. In August 1947 Warners ordered 100,000 copies of the novel to be published by Ross Press.

By February 1947 Errol Flynn's name was linked to the movie. By April both Flynn and Ann Sheridan were signed as leads. Ann Sheridan later said the film "was not a good picture" and Jack Warner "was amazed that I accepted it" but that "Errol Flynn was a big box office name and women didn't get to do Westerns very often and I thought it might be a good combination and I thought that it might turn into a good picture. Unfortunately it didn't."

Raoul Walsh agreed to take on direction, determined to keep the film's star Errol Flynn on a "short leash". Flynn had gained an infamous reputation in Hollywood for his behavior and drinking habits.

Longstreet later wrote that "by 1947 Flynn had deteriorated. His drinking dominated, and I suspect drugs too; his wives, he'd say, were like shackles. And he was finding it hard to face a camera. The drinking had angered Warner Bros and he was about to be let go." Longstreet says Ann Sheridan was known for "lapping up the sauce" as well, and claims Walsh told him "Kid, write it fast. They're not drinking. They promised Jack Warner that, but you never know."

In April, Thomas Mitchell signed to play the third lead.

=== Filming ===
The production started in April 1947. It was Flynn's first movie since the previous August when he finished making Cry Wolf. Prior to that, he had taken a long cruise on the Zaca that had become the basis for the movie The Cruise of the Zaca. It was also a period where he bought property on Jamaica.

The movie was shot in Warner Bros studio and on location in Bishop, California. It was a big budget effort with hundreds of extras and over 75 speaking parts.

Longstreet says "at first the shooting of the picture went well. Work was good and Walsh, experienced at handling actors, kept matters in control." However the writer says one morning he arrived on set to find Walsh tearing pages out of the script because they contained "too much yak-yak." Longstreet says "I knew then the picture was in trouble."

Throughout the shoot Flynn and Sheridan would sip ice water which contained vodka. Flynn told Longstreet "I can't make head nor tail of your story."

Ann Sheridan also held up production when she fell ill with laryngitis. Jack L. Warner wrote the following memo during the shoot:

If Flynn is late, if liquor is being used so that from the middle of the afternoon on it is impossible for the director to make any more scenes with Flynn, if liquor is brought on the set or into the studio we must hold Flynn legally and financially responsible for any delay in making the picture. We may go so far as to abrogate the entire contract and sue him for damages...We will never again make pictures where Flynn or any other artist becomes incoherent due to liquor or whatever it may be...This has happened repeatedly during the last pictures we have made in which Flynn has appeared and we cannot permit it any longer.

Longstreet said "the stars' behavior resulted in delays, which led to cost overruns, which forced the studio heads to declare Silver River was finished. It is the only studio picture I know of for which there is no ending; the picture ends in midair, but no one, as far as I know, ever bothered to ask why."

Filming was complete by August. Flynn and Walsh never worked together again.

== Reception ==
=== Critical ===
The New York Times said Walsh crammed "all the excitement... into the first ten minutes or so" and argued the film "went downhill after that." The Los Angeles Times said it "boasts all the trimmings."

Filmink magazine called it "a poor movie. After an exciting opening sequence set during the Civil War (which feels like it was tacked on to jazz things up after an unsuccessful preview because it doesn't have that much to do with the plot), the story slows down and becomes this weird slog."

=== Box office ===
Variety estimated that by the end of 1948 the film had earned $2.2 million in rentals in the US. This was an improvement on recent Flynn vehicles.

The film recorded admissions of 1,416,488 in France.

According to Warner Bros records, the film earned $2,174,000 domestically and $1,310,000 overseas.

== Notes ==
- Longstreet, Stephen (1988). "Gentleman Rogue". In Peary, Danny (ed.). Close-ups : intimate profiles of movie stars by their costars, directors, screenwriters, and friends. Simon & Schuster. pp. 157–159.
