= Dark Passage (film) =

1947 US mystery thriller film by Delmer Daves

- Theatrical release poster
- Directed by: Delmer Daves
- Screenplay by: Delmer Daves
- Based on: Dark Passage by David Goodis
- Produced by: Jerry Wald
- Starring: Humphrey Bogart; Lauren Bacall; Bruce Bennett; Agnes Moorehead; Tom D'Andrea
- Cinematography: Sidney Hickox
- Edited by: David Weisbart
- Music by: Franz Waxman
- Production company: Warner Bros. Pictures
- Distributed by: Warner Bros. Pictures
- Release dates: September 5, 1947 (New York City); September 27, 1947 (United States)
- Running time: 106 minutes
- Country: United States
- Language: English
- Budget: $1.6 million
- Box office: $3.4 million

Dark Passage is a 1947 American film noir by director Delmer Daves and starring Humphrey Bogart and Lauren Bacall. The film is based on the 1946 novel of the same title by David Goodis. It was the third of four films real-life couple Bacall and Bogart made together.

The story follows protagonist Vincent Parry's attempt to hide from the law and clear his name of murder. The first portion of the film subjectively depicts the male lead's point of view, concealing Bogart's face until his character undergoes plastic surgery to change his appearance.

== Plot ==
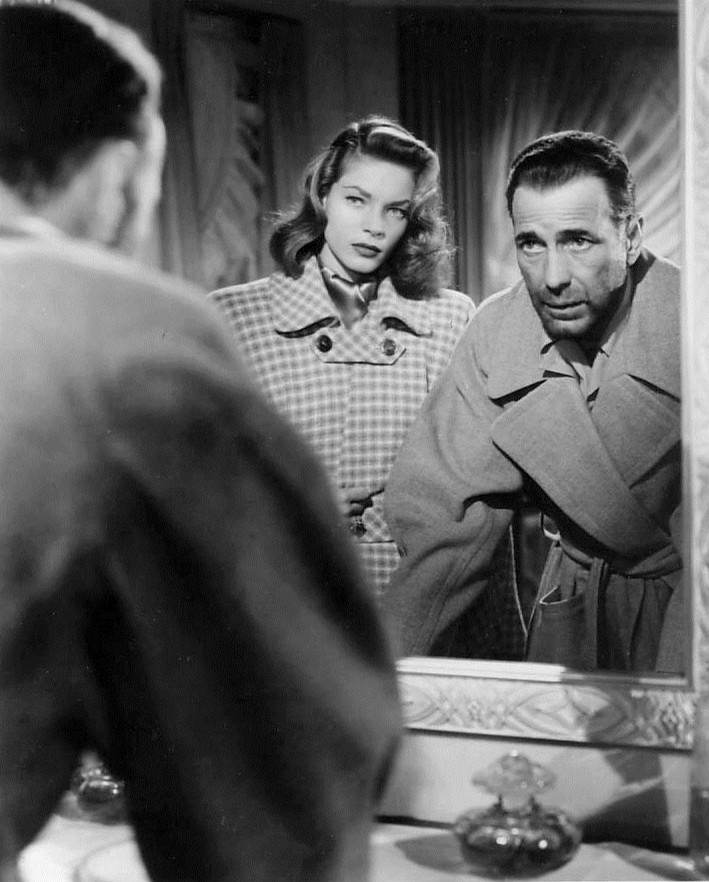
Lauren Bacall and Humphrey Bogart in Dark Passage

Convicted wife-killer Vincent Parry escapes from San Quentin Prison in a metal laundry barrel and evades police by hitching a ride with a passing motorist. Already suspicious of Parry's appearance, the motorist hears a radio news report about an escaped convict; Parry resorts to beating him unconscious. Wealthy dilettante Irene Jansen, a stranger, picks up Parry and smuggles him past a police roadblock into San Francisco. She offers him shelter in her apartment while she buys him new clothes.

Meanwhile, Irene's acquaintance, Madge, knocks at the door, but Parry turns her away by yelling through the unopen door. A former friend of Parry's wife, romantically spurned by him, Madge had testified spitefully at his trial, claiming his dying wife identified him as the killer. On her return, Irene is alarmed that Parry had spoken to Madge. Irene explains that she followed Parry's case with interest, believing him innocent. After her own father had been falsely convicted of murder, she took an interest in miscarriages of justice. Hearing of Parry's escape on the radio, she had purposefully set out to find him.

Wearing his new clothes, Parry leaves but is recognized by a cab driver, Sam, who proves sympathetic and takes him to a plastic surgeon who can change his appearance. Parry arranges to stay with a friend, George, during his recuperation from surgery. On returning to George's apartment, Parry finds George murdered. He takes refuge again with Irene, who nurses him through his recuperation. Parry's fingerprints are found on George's trumpet, and he is wanted for another murder.

Madge and her ex-fiancé Bob, who is romantically interested in Irene, visit while Parry hides in the bedroom. While Parry overhears, Madge asks to stay with Irene for protection, worried that Parry will kill her for testifying against him. Irene insists that Madge leave. Maliciously, Madge intentionally reveals to Bob that Irene recently had a male guest. More disgusted with Madge's behavior than learning of a romantic rival, Bob drags Madge hastily off.

After his bandages are removed, Parry reluctantly parts from Irene to avoid compromising her further. At a diner, an off-duty detective becomes suspicious of his behavior and asks for identification. When Parry claims to have left it at his hotel, the detective escorts him, but Parry darts in front of a moving car to escape. Finding a hotel to hide in, he is surprised by the motorist he knocked out the day of his escape. Baker, a callow schemer and ex-con of San Quentin, has been following Parry since reviving and seeing Irene picking Parry up. Holding Parry at gunpoint, Baker now demands Irene pay him $60,000, a third of her worth, or he will turn Parry in for a $5,000 reward and implicate Irene. Parry pretends to agree reluctantly to the terms. On the way to Irene's apartment, claiming to take a shortcut, Parry detours to a secluded spot underneath the Golden Gate Bridge, disarms Baker, and questions him; the answers convince Parry that Madge is behind the deaths of his wife and George. The two men fight, and Baker falls to his death.

Knowing Madge will not recognize his new face, Parry calls on her, pretending to be a friend of Bob's and feigning interest in courting her. Recognizing his voice, she soon discovers his true identity; Parry accuses Madge of the two murders and attempts to coerce her into signing a confession. She refuses, and during their ensuing argument and physical struggle she plunges through a window to her death.

Certain he will be accused of Madge's murder, as well as George's and his wife's, and unable to prove his innocence, Parry decides again to flee. At the bus station, seeing a romantic couple interact, he whimsically plays the song "Too Marvelous for Words" on the jukebox, a song he had played at Irene's apartment; he decides to phone Irene, asking her to meet him in seaside Paita, Peru. She readily promises she will.

Sometime later, as Parry has a drink in a palm-studded bar in Paita, he hears the band suddenly begin playing the song "Too Marvelous for Words". Looking up, he sees Irene. The couple embraces and slow dances to their song.

== Cast ==
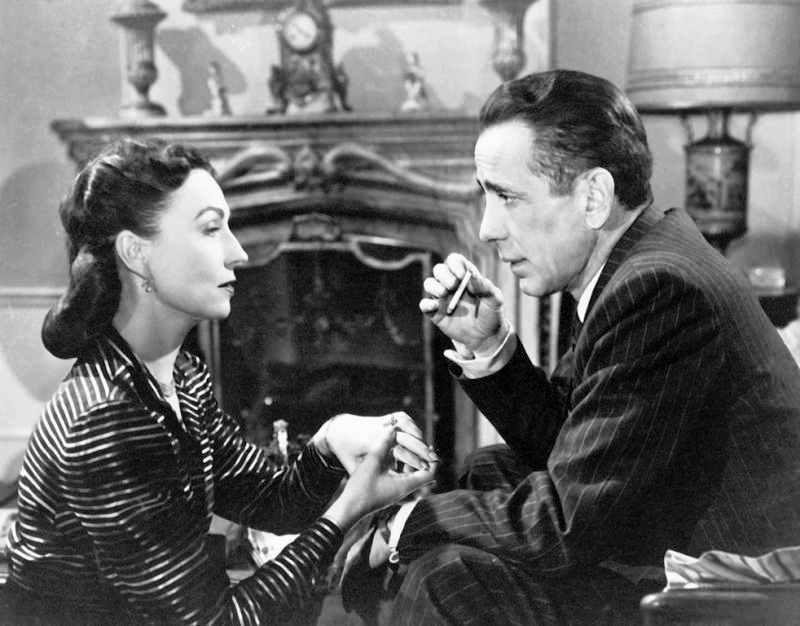
Agnes Moorehead and Humphrey Bogart in Dark Passage

- Humphrey Bogart as Vincent Parry
- Lauren Bacall as Irene Jansen
- Agnes Moorehead as Madge Rapf
- Bruce Bennett as Bob
- Tom D'Andrea as Cabby (Sam)
- Clifton Young as Baker
- Douglas Kennedy as Detective Kennedy in Diner
- Rory Mallinson as George Fellsinger
- Houseley Stevenson as Dr. Walter Coley
- Mary Field as Aunt Mary at Bus Station (uncredited)
- John Arledge as Lonely Man at Bus Station (uncredited)
- Frank Wilcox as Vincent Parry (picture in the newspaper, uncredited)
- Tom Fadden as Diner Counterman (uncredited)

== Production ==
Warner Bros. Pictures paid author David Goodis $25,000 for the rights to the story, which had originally been serialized in The Saturday Evening Post from July 20 to September 7, 1946, before being published in book form. Bogart himself had read the book and wanted to make it into a movie. At the time that Dark Passage was shot, Bogart was the best-paid actor in Hollywood, averaging $450,000 a year.

Robert Montgomery had made the film Lady in the Lake (1946) which also uses a "subjective camera" technique, in which the viewer sees the action through the protagonist's eyes. This technique was used in 1927 in France by Abel Gance for Napoléon and by the director Rouben Mamoulian for the first five minutes of Dr. Jekyll and Mr. Hyde (1931). Film critic Hal Erikson believes Dark Passage does a better job at using this point-of-view technique, writing, "The first hour or so of Dark Passage does the same thing—and the results are far more successful than anything seen in Montgomery's film."

According to Bacall, in her autobiography By Myself, during the filming of Dark Passage, Bogart's hair began to fall out in clumps, the result of alopecia areata, although photos from their 1945 wedding show Bogart to be losing his hair two years earlier. By the end of filming he wore a full wig. Bogart eventually had B12 shots and other treatments to counteract the effects, but was forced to wear a full wig in his next picture, The Treasure of the Sierra Madre.

=== Filming locations ===
Parts of the film were filmed on location in San Francisco, California, including the Filbert Steps and the cable car system. The elegant Streamline Moderne Malloch Building on Telegraph Hill was used for the apartment of Irene Jansen where Parry hides out and recuperates from his surgery. Apartment Number 10 was Jansen's. The current residents of that apartment occasionally place a cutout of Bogart in the window. The small diner was "Harry's Wagon" at 1921 Post Street, a long-closed beanery in the Fillmore District of San Francisco.

== Reception ==
=== Box office ===
The film earned $2.31 million domestically and $1.11 million in overseas markets, for a worldwide total of $3.4 million.

=== Critical response ===
The New York Times film critic Bosley Crowther gave the film a mixed review and was not impressed by Bogart's performance but was impressed by Bacall's work. He wrote:

When [Bogart] finally does come before the camera, he seems uncommonly chastened and reserved, a state in which Mr. Bogart does not appear at his theatrical best. However, the mood of his performance is compensated somewhat by that of Miss Bacall, who generates quite a lot of pressure as a sharp-eyed, knows-what-she-wants girl.

He made the case that the best part of the film is:

San Francisco ... is liberally and vividly employed as the realistic setting for the Warners' Dark Passage. Writer-Director Delmar [sic] Daves has very smartly and effectively used the picturesque streets of that city and its stunning panoramas ... to give a dramatic backdrop to his rather incredible yarn. So, even though bored by the story—which, because of its sag, you may be—you can usually enjoy the scenery, which is as good as a travelogue.

The Chicago Tribune laid out the plot's many implausibilities:

"If you have the right friends, it really is a simple matter to break out of San Quentin, obtain shelter and a thousand dollars, have your face remodeled so completely that even your closest acquaintance won't recognize you, escape from a smart detective, avoid implication despite being on the scene where three different people die, and retire to live happily ever after in a picturesque Peruvian town with a gal who loves you and has $200,000. If you don't believe it, just watch Humphrey Bogart in his latest, although I can't think of any other reason for seeing it...on the whole, 'Dark Passage' is completely preposterous."

The Philadelphia Inquirer wrote:

"Borrowing heavily from 'Lady in the Lake' for tricky technique ... Daves has provided new and fancy trimming for the not unfamiliar yarn of the escaped convict bent on establishing his innocence ... on [Bogart's] side, and for no convincing reason, is Lauren Bacall, lovely, wealthy landscape painter who picks him up in her station wagon during the early moments of his escape and whisks him home to her luxurious duplex. Also generously helping the wrongly accused wife-killer are a philosophic taxi driver and a wonderful plastic surgeon ... Although the plot doesn't bear too much close inspection, performances and direction lend considerable fascination to a desperate man's struggle for freedom ... Miss Bacall is attractive and very, very efficient ... while Agnes Moorehead is about as mean as they come.... Supporting roles are exceptionally well played."

On Rotten Tomatoes the film held an approval rating of 90% based on 31 reviews as of 2022 and beyond, with an average rating of 7.7/10. Review aggregator Metacritic assigned the film a weighted average score of 68 out of 100, based on 10 critics, indicating "generally favorable" reviews.

== See also ==
- The Man with Bogart's Face
