= List of Warner Bros. films (1940–1949) =

This is a list of films produced, co-produced, and/or distributed by Warner Bros. Pictures, Inc. and also its subsidiary First National Pictures in the 1940s. This list does not include third-party films or films Warner gained the rights to as a result of mergers or acquisitions.

== 1940 ==
Release date	Title	Notes
January 6, 1940	A Child Is Born	
January 13, 1940	Brother Rat and a Baby	
January 27, 1940	The Fighting 69th	
January 29, 1940	British Intelligence	in Public domain
February 3, 1940	Calling Philo Vance	
February 10, 1940	Granny Get Your Gun	
February 17, 1940	Castle on the Hudson	
March 2, 1940	Dr. Ehrlich's Magic Bullet	
March 16, 1940	Three Cheers for the Irish	
March 23, 1940	Virginia City	
April 6, 1940	It All Came True	
April 13, 1940	King of the Lumberjacks	
April 20, 1940	'Til We Meet Again	
April 27, 1940	An Angel from Texas	
May 4, 1940	Tear Gas Squad	
May 11, 1940	Saturday's Children	
May 18, 1940	Flight Angels	
May 25, 1940	Torrid Zone	
June 1, 1940	Murder in the Air	
June 8, 1940	Brother Orchid	
June 15, 1940	A Fugitive from Justice	
June 22, 1940	Gambling on the High Seas	
July 1, 1940	The Sea Hawk	
July 13, 1940	All This, and Heaven Too	
July 13, 1940	My Love Came Back	
July 16, 1940	The Man Who Talked Too Much	
July 27, 1940	Ladies Must Live	
August 3, 1940	They Drive by Night	
August 10, 1940	River's End	
August 17, 1940	Money and the Woman	
August 24, 1940	Flowing Gold	
September 7, 1940	Calling All Husbands	
September 14, 1940	No Time for Comedy	
September 21, 1940	City for Conquest	
October 5, 1940	Knute Rockne, All American	Inducted into the National Film Registry in 1997
October 19, 1940	A Dispatch from Reuters	
October 26, 1940	Tugboat Annie Sails Again	
November 2, 1940	Always a Bride	
November 9, 1940	East of the River	
November 16, 1940	South of Suez	
November 18, 1940	Father Is a Prince	
November 23, 1940	The Letter	
November 30, 1940	Lady with Red Hair	
December 7, 1940	She Couldn't Say No	
December 28, 1940	Santa Fe Trail	in Public domain

== 1941 ==
Release date	Title	Notes
January 4, 1941	Four Mothers	
January 11, 1941	The Case of the Black Parrot	
January 18, 1941	Honeymoon for Three	
January 25, 1941	High Sierra	
February 8, 1941	Flight from Destiny	
February 12, 1941	Father's Son	
February 15, 1941	The Great Mr. Nobody	
February 22, 1941	The Strawberry Blonde	
March 1, 1941	Shadows on the Stairs	in Public domain
March 8, 1941	Footsteps in the Dark	
March 15, 1941	Here Comes Happiness	
March 21, 1941	The Sea Wolf	
March 29, 1941	Knockout	
April 5, 1941	A Shot in the Dark	
April 12, 1941	The Great Lie	
April 19, 1941	Strange Alibi	
April 25, 1941	The Wagons Roll at Night	
May 3, 1941	Thieves Fall Out	
May 3, 1941	Meet John Doe	theatrical distribution only; in Public domain
May 10, 1941	Affectionately Yours	
May 17, 1941	Singapore Woman	
May 24, 1941	The Nurse's Secret	
May 31, 1941	Million Dollar Baby	
June 7, 1941	Shining Victory	
June 14, 1941	Out of the Fog	
June 28, 1941	Underground	
July 5, 1941	Kisses for Breakfast	
July 12, 1941	The Bride Came C.O.D.	
July 19, 1941	Bullets for O'Hara	
July 26, 1941	Bad Men of Missouri	
August 2, 1941	Three Sons o' Guns	
August 7, 1941	Highway West	
August 9, 1941	Manpower	
August 13, 1941	International Squadron	
August 30, 1941	Dive Bomber	
September 6, 1941	The Smiling Ghost	
September 13, 1941	Navy Blues	
September 20, 1941	Nine Lives Are Not Enough	
September 27, 1941	Sergeant York	Inducted into the National Film Registry in 2008
September 1941	Passage from Hong Kong	
October 4, 1941	Law of the Tropics	
October 17, 1941	Target for Tonight	British film US theatrical distribution only; produced by Crown Film Unit
October 18, 1941	The Maltese Falcon	Inducted into the National Film Registry in 1989
November 1, 1941	One Foot in Heaven	
November 15, 1941	Blues in the Night	
November 21, 1941	They Died with Their Boots On	
December 2, 1941	All Through the Night	
December 6, 1941	The Body Disappears	
December 13, 1941	Steel Against the Sky	
December 24, 1941	Dangerously They Live	
December 25, 1941	You're in the Army Now	

== 1942 ==
Release date	Title	Notes
January 24, 1942	The Man Who Came to Dinner	
January 31, 1942	Wild Bill Hickok Rides	
February 3, 1942	The Prime Minister	
February 7, 1942	Atlantic Ferry	
February 21, 1942	Captains of the Clouds	
March 7, 1942	Bullet Scars	
March 14, 1942	Always in My Heart	
March 21, 1942	This Was Paris	
April 1, 1942	Lady Gangster	in Public domain
April 4, 1942	I Was Framed	
April 4, 1942	The Male Animal	
April 11, 1942	Murder in the Big House	
April 18, 1942	Kings Row	
May 2, 1942	Larceny, Inc.	
May 16, 1942	In This Our Life	
May 30, 1942	Juke Girl	
June 6, 1942	Spy Ship	
June 6, 1942	Yankee Doodle Dandy	Inducted into the National Film Registry in 1993
June 13, 1942	The Big Shot	
July 18, 1942	Wings for the Eagle	
July 25, 1942	Escape from Crime	
August 1, 1942	The Gay Sisters	
September 5, 1942	Across the Pacific	
September 17, 1942	Secret Enemies	
September 19, 1942	Busses Roar	
September 26, 1942	Desperate Journey	
October 10, 1942	You Can't Escape Forever	
October 31, 1942	Now, Voyager	Inducted into the National Film Registry in 2007
November 7, 1942	The Hidden Hand	
November 14, 1942	Gentleman Jim	
November 26, 1942	Casablanca	Inducted into the National Film Registry in 1989
November 28, 1942	George Washington Slept Here	
December 5, 1942	Flying Fortress	

== 1943 ==
Release date	Title	Notes
January 16, 1943	The Gorilla Man	
February 6, 1943	Truck Busters	
February 20, 1943	The Hard Way	
March 3, 1943	The Mysterious Doctor	
March 20, 1943	Air Force	
April 24, 1943	Edge of Darkness	
May 22, 1943	Mission to Moscow	
June 12, 1943	Action in the North Atlantic	
June 23, 1943	The Constant Nymph	
July 1, 1943	Pledge to Bataan	
July 3, 1943	Background to Danger	
August 14, 1943	This Is the Army	in Public domain
August 27, 1943	Watch on the Rhine	
September 18, 1943	Murder on the Waterfront	
September 25, 1943	Thank Your Lucky Stars	
September 27, 1943	Adventure in Iraq	in Public domain
October 23, 1943	Princess O'Rourke	
November 6, 1943	Find the Blackmailer	
November 13, 1943	Northern Pursuit	
November 27, 1943	Old Acquaintance	
December 17, 1943	The Desert Song	
December 31, 1943	Destination Tokyo	

== 1944 ==
Release date	Title	Notes
February 19, 1944	In Our Time	
March 11, 1944	Passage to Marseille	
April 8, 1944	Shine On, Harvest Moon	
April 22, 1944	Uncertain Glory	co-production with Thomson Productions
May 20, 1944	Between Two Worlds	
May 25, 1944	Mr. Skeffington	
June 10, 1944	Make Your Own Bed	
July 1, 1944	The Mask of Dimitrios	
July 22, 1944	The Adventures of Mark Twain	
September 2, 1944	Janie	
September 9, 1944	Crime by Night	
September 23, 1944	Arsenic and Old Lace	produced between 1941 and 1942
October 7, 1944	The Last Ride	
October 11, 1944	To Have and Have Not	
October 20, 1944	The Very Thought of You	
October 24, 1944	The Conspirators	
November 25, 1944	The Doughgirls	
December 31, 1944	Hollywood Canteen	

== 1945 ==
Release date	Title	Notes
January 31, 1945	Roughly Speaking	
February 17, 1945	Objective, Burma!	
March 2, 1945	Hotel Berlin	
April 7, 1945	God Is My Co-Pilot	
April 28, 1945	The Horn Blows at Midnight	
May 1, 1945	Escape in the Desert	
June 9, 1945	Pillow to Post	
June 15, 1945	Conflict	
July 14, 1945	The Corn Is Green	
August 11, 1945	Christmas in Connecticut	
August 24, 1945	Pride of the Marines	
September 22, 1945	Rhapsody in Blue	
October 20, 1945	Mildred Pierce	Inducted into the National Film Registry in 1996
November 10, 1945	Confidential Agent	
November 14, 1945	Danger Signal	
December 1, 1945	Too Young to Know	
December 7, 1945	Appointment in Tokyo	distribution only
December 29, 1945	San Antonio	

== 1946 ==
Release date	Title	Notes
January 26, 1946	My Reputation	
January 28, 1946	Three Strangers	
March 9, 1946	Cinderella Jones	
March 30, 1946	Saratoga Trunk	
April 20, 1946	Devotion	produced in 1943
May 11, 1946	Her Kind of Man	
June 1, 1946	One More Tomorrow	
June 22, 1946	Janie Gets Married	
July 6, 1946	A Stolen Life	co-production with B.D. Production
July 20, 1946	Of Human Bondage	
July 26, 1946	Two Guys from Milwaukee	
August 3, 1946	Night and Day	
August 31, 1946	The Big Sleep	Inducted into the National Film Registry in 1997
September 14, 1946	Shadow of a Woman	
September 28, 1946	Cloak and Dagger (Note: Owned by Paramount Pictures (via Melange Pictures))	distribution only; produced by United States Pictures
October 18, 1946	Deception	
November 1, 1946	Nobody Lives Forever	
November 9, 1946	Never Say Goodbye	
November 23, 1946	The Verdict	
December 25, 1946	The Beast with Five Fingers	
December 25, 1946	Humoresque	
December 28, 1946	The Time, the Place and the Girl	

== 1947 ==
Release date	Title	Notes
January 11, 1947	The Man I Love	
February 22, 1947	Nora Prentiss	
March 4, 1947	The Two Mrs. Carrolls	
March 5, 1947	Pursued	distribution only; produced by United States Pictures
March 29, 1947	That Way with Women	
April 12, 1947	Stallion Road	
May 2, 1947	Love and Learn	
June 5, 1947	The Unfaithful	
June 6, 1947	Cheyenne	
July 26, 1947	Possessed	
July 30, 1947	Deep Valley	
August 14, 1947	Life with Father	in Public domain
August 19, 1947	Cry Wolf	
September 27, 1947	Dark Passage	
October 3, 1947	The Unsuspected	co-production with Michael Curtiz Productions
November 1, 1947	That Hagen Girl	
November 7, 1947	Escape Me Never	
December 10, 1947	Always Together	
December 25, 1947	The Voice of the Turtle	
December 27, 1947	My Wild Irish Rose	

== 1948 ==
Release date	Title	Notes
January 24, 1948	The Treasure of the Sierra Madre	Inducted into the National Film Registry in 1990
February 7, 1948	My Girl Tisa	distribution only; produced by United States Pictures
March 6, 1948	They Made Me a Fugitive	distribution only; produced by A. R. Shipman Productions/Alliance Films
March 27, 1948	April Showers	
April 7, 1948	Winter Meeting	
April 16, 1948	To the Victor	
May 15, 1948	The Woman in White	
May 29, 1948	Silver River	
June 13, 1948	Wallflower	
June 26, 1948	The Big Punch	
July 3, 1948	Romance on the High Seas	co-production with Michael Curtiz Productions
July 31, 1948	Key Largo	
July 31, 1948	Embraceable You	
August 26, 1948	Rope (Note: Owned by Universal Pictures)	distribution only; produced by Transatlantic Pictures
September 4, 1948	Two Guys from Texas	Co-produced with Warner Bros. Cartoons
September 14, 1948	Johnny Belinda	
October 9, 1948	Smart Girls Don't Talk	
October 29, 1948	June Bride	
November 27, 1948	Fighter Squadron	
December 1, 1948	Adventures of Don Juan	
December 23, 1948	The Decision of Christopher Blake	
December 24, 1948	Whiplash	

== 1949 ==
Release date	Title	Notes
January 1, 1949	One Sunday Afternoon	
February 4, 1949	John Loves Mary	
February 15, 1949	Flaxy Martin	
March 6, 1949	South of St. Louis	distribution only; produced by United States Pictures
March 26, 1949	A Kiss in the Dark	
April 1, 1949	Burma Victory	
April 2, 1949	Homicide	
April 16, 1949	My Dream Is Yours	Co-produced by Warner Bros. Cartoons
May 3, 1949	The Younger Brothers	
May 6, 1949	Flamingo Road	co-production with Michael Curtiz Productions
June 10, 1949	Night Unto Night	
June 11, 1949	Colorado Territory	
June 30, 1949	One Last Fling	
July 2, 1949	The Fountainhead	
July 16, 1949	The Girl from Jones Beach	
July 30, 1949	Look for the Silver Lining	
August 1, 1949	It's a Great Feeling	
September 3, 1949	White Heat	Inducted into the National Film Registry in 2003
September 10, 1949	The House Across the Street	
September 15, 1949	Golden Madonna	British-Italian film co-production with Pendennis Productions and Produttore Films Internazionali
September 30, 1949	Task Force	
October 8, 1949	Under Capricorn (Note: Owned by Shout! Studios (via Westchester Films)) (Note: Owned by CBS (via King World Productions) with Paramount Pictures handling distribution)	distribution only; produced by Transatlantic Pictures
October 21, 1949	Beyond the Forest	
November 12, 1949	The Story of Seabiscuit	
November 26, 1949	Always Leave Them Laughing	
December 2, 1949	The Hasty Heart	U.S. distribution only; produced by Associated British Picture Corporation
December 16, 1949	The Lady Takes a Sailor	
December 31, 1949	The Inspector General	in Public domain

== See also ==
- List of New Line Cinema films
- List of films based on DC Comics publications
- List of Warner Bros. theatrical animated feature films
- Category:Lists of films by studio
