= Jack Mower =

American actor (1890–1965)

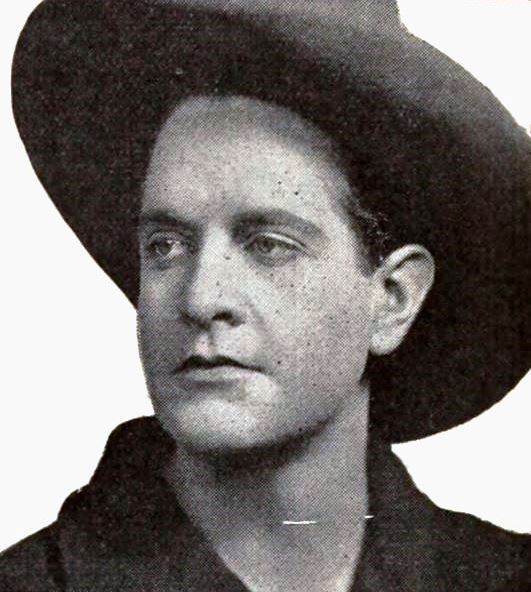
- Mower in 1925
- Born: September 5, 1890; Honolulu, Hawaii, U.S.
- Died: January 6, 1965 (aged 74); Hollywood, California, U.S.
- Education: Punahou School
- Occupation: Actor
- Years active: 1914–1965

Jack Mower (September 5, 1890 – January 6, 1965) was an American film actor. He appeared in more than 520 films between 1914 and 1965. He was born in Honolulu and died in Hollywood.

After studying at Punahou College, in Saugus, CA, Mower moved to the mainland, and performed in vaudeville and in musical comedies on stage. His work on screen included serials and silent films. Mower was a leading man in silent films, but played bit parts after sound films came into vogue.

He was in Goodwill Pictures films.

== Selected filmography ==
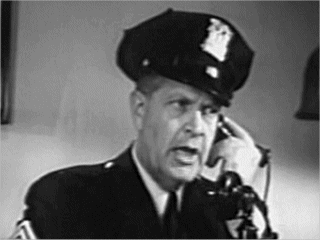
Mower in Lady Gangster (1942)

1920s

- The Beautiful Gambler (1921)
- The Rowdy (1921)
- Short Skirts (1921)
- Silent Years (1921)
- Saturday Night (1922)
- Manslaughter (1922)
- When Husbands Deceive (1922)
- Pure Grit (1923)
- The Last Hour (1923)
- The Shock (1923)
- Uncle Tom's Cabin (1927)

1930s

- Bad Company (1931) (uncredited)
- The Phantom Express (1932) (uncredited)
- The Pride of the Legion (1932)
- The Lone Trail (1932)
- Pilgrimage (1933) (uncredited)
- The House on 56th Street (1933) (uncredited)
- Counsellor at Law (1933) (uncredited)
- Palooka (1934) (uncredited)
- Among the Missing (1934) (uncredited)
- David Harum (1934) (uncredited)
- Upper World (1934) (uncredited)
- The Witching Hour (1934) (uncredited)
- The Woman in Red (1935) (uncredited)
- The Whole Town's Talking (1935) (uncredited)
- Living on Velvet (1935) (uncredited)
- Naughty Marietta (1935) (uncredited)
- Dante's Inferno (1935) (uncredited)
- Diamond Jim (1935) (uncredited)
- The Gay Deception (1935) (uncredited)
- Special Agent (1935) (uncredited)
- The Littlest Rebel (1935) (uncredited)
- Love Before Breakfast (1936) (uncredited)
- Mr. Deeds Goes to Town (1936) (uncredited)
- Black Legion (1937) (uncredited)
- Marked Woman (1937) (uncredited)
- Mountain Justice (1937) (uncredited)
- San Quentin (1937) (uncredited)
- Kid Galahad (1937) (uncredited)
- The Case of the Stuttering Bishop (1937) (uncredited)
- Ever Since Eve (1937) (uncredited)
- Gold Is Where You Find It (1938) (uncredited)
- A Slight Case of Murder (1938) (uncredited)
- The Sisters (1938) (uncredited)
- Girls on Probation (1938) (uncredited)
- Nancy Drew, Detective (1938) (uncredited)
- Angels with Dirty Faces (1938) (uncredited)
- King of the Underworld (1939) (uncredited)
- They Made Me a Criminal (1939) (uncredited)
- Nancy Drew... Reporter (1939) (uncredited)
- The Oklahoma Kid (1939) (uncredited)
- Dodge City (1939) (uncredited)
- Dark Victory (1939) (uncredited)
- Confessions of a Nazi Spy (1939) (uncredited)
- The Roaring Twenties (1939) (uncredited)
- The Return of Doctor X (1939) (uncredited)
- Nancy Drew and the Hidden Staircase (1939) (uncredited)
- Dust Be My Destiny (1939) (uncredited)
- Espionage Agent (1939) (uncredited)

1940s

- Granny Get Your Gun (1940) (uncredited)
- Castle on the Hudson (1940) (uncredited)
- 3 Cheers for the Irish (1940) (uncredited)
- Virginia City (1940) (uncredited)
- They Drive by Night (1940) (uncredited)
- Flowing Gold (1940) (uncredited)
- City for Conquest (1940) (uncredited)
- Lady with Red Hair (1940) (uncredited)
- Santa Fe Trail (1940) (uncredited)
- Four Mothers (1941) (uncredited)
- High Sierra (1941) (uncredited)
- The Strawberry Blonde (1941) (uncredited)
- Footsteps in the Dark (1941) (uncredited)
- Meet John Doe (1941) (uncredited)
- Out of the Fog (1941) (uncredited)
- Sergeant York (1941) (uncredited)
- The Bride Came C.O.D. (1941) (uncredited)
- Bad Men of Missouri (1941) (uncredited)
- The Smiling Ghost (1941) (uncredited)
- One Foot in Heaven (1941) (uncredited)
- The Maltese Falcon (1941) (uncredited)
- They Died with Their Boots On (1941) (uncredited)
- Steel Against the Sky (1941) (uncredited)
- Dangerously They Live (1941) (uncredited)
- The Man Who Came to Dinner (1942) (uncredited)
- Wild Bill Hickok Rides (1942) (uncredited)
- King's Row (1942) (uncredited)
- Lady Gangster (1942) (uncredited)
- Larceny, Inc. (1942) (uncredited)
- Yankee Doodle Dandy (1942) (uncredited)
- The Big Shot (1942) (uncredited)
- Across the Pacific (1942) (uncredited)
- Wings for the Eagle (1942) (uncredited)
- The Magnificent Dope (1942) (uncredited)
- The Gay Sisters (1942) (uncredited)
- George Washington Slept Here (1942) (uncredited)
- Gentleman Jim (1942) (uncredited)
- Action in the North Atlantic (1943) (uncredited)
- Watch on the Rhine (1943) (uncredited)
- Thank Your Lucky Stars (1943) (uncredited)
- Princess O'Rourke (1943) (uncredited)
- Northern Pursuit (1943) (uncredited)
- Old Acquaintance (1943) (uncredited)
- Destination Tokyo (1943) (uncredited)
- Mr. Skeffington (1944) (uncredited)
- The Adventures of Mark Twain (1944) (uncredited)
- Hollywood Canteen (1944) (uncredited)
- Wing and a Prayer (1944) (uncredited)
- Hotel Berlin (1945) (uncredited)
- The Clock (1945) (uncredited)
- The Horn Blows at Midnight (1945) (uncredited)
- Conflict (1945) (uncredited)
- Christmas in Connecticut (1945) (uncredited)
- Mildred Pierce (1945) (uncredited)
- They Were Expendable (1945) (uncredited)
- San Antonio (1945) (uncredited)
- Shadows Over Chinatown (1946) (uncredited)
- Night and Day (1946) (uncredited)
- A Stolen Life (1946) (uncredited)
- Two Guys from Milwaukee (1946) (uncredited)
- The Unfaithful (1947) (uncredited)
- Possessed (1947) (uncredited)
- That Hagen Girl (1947) (uncredited)
- The Chinese Ring (1947) (uncredited)
- Cry Wolf (1947) (uncredited)
- My Wild Irish Rose (1947) (uncredited)
- My Girl Tisa (1948) (uncredited)
- Two Guys from Texas (1948) (uncredited)
- June Bride (1948) (uncredited)
- 3 Godfathers (1948) (uncredited)
- Flaxy Martin (1949) (uncredited)
- South of St. Louis (1949) (uncredited)
- A Kiss in the Dark (1949) (uncredited)
- My Dream Is Yours (1949) (uncredited)
- The Fountainhead (1949) (uncredited)
- One Last Fling (1949) (uncredited)
- The Girl from Jones Beach (1949) (uncredited)
- The Inspector General (1949) (uncredited)

1950s

- The Daughter of Rosie O'Grady (1950) (uncredited)
- Montana (1950) (uncredited)
- Backfire (1950) (uncredited)
- Chain Lightning (1950) (uncredited)
- Perfect Strangers (1950) (uncredited)
- Colt .45 (1950) (uncredited)
- The Flame and the Arrow (1950) (uncredited)
- The Underworld Story (1950) (uncredited)
- The Breaking Point (1950) (uncredited)
- Dallas (1950) (uncredited)
- Storm Warning (1951) (uncredited)
- The Enforcer (1951) (uncredited)
- Lullaby of Broadway (1951) (uncredited)
- Lightning Strikes Twice (1951) (uncredited)
- I Was a Communist for the FBI (1951) (uncredited)
- Goodbye, My Fancy (1951) (uncredited)
- Fort Worth (1951) (uncredited)
- Tomorrow Is Another Day (1951) (uncredited)
- Come Fill the Cup (1951) (uncredited)
- Close to My Heart (1951) (uncredited)
- On Moonlight Bay (1951) (uncredited)
- I'll See You in My Dreams (1951) (uncredited)
- Carson City (1952) (uncredited)
- Has Anybody Seen My Gal (1952) (uncredited)
- Francis Goes to West Point (1952) (uncredited)
- The Story of Will Rogers (1952) (uncredited)
- The Miracle of Our Lady of Fatima (1952) (uncredited)
- Springfield Rifle (1952) (uncredited)
- Ma and Pa Kettle on Vacation (1952) (uncredited)
- By the Light of the Silvery Moon (1953) (uncredited)
- Trouble Along the Way (1953) (uncredited)
- It Happens Every Thursday (1953) (uncredited)
- The Man from the Alamo (1953) (uncredited)
- The Stranger Wore a Gun (1953) (uncredited)
- Meet Me at the Fair (1953) (uncredited)
- The Sun Shines Bright (1953) (uncredited)
- House of Wax (1953) (uncredited)
- Thunder Over the Plains (1953) (uncredited)
- Calamity Jane (1953) (uncredited)
- The Command (1954) (uncredited)
- The Boy from Oklahoma (1954) (uncredited)
- A Star Is Born (1954) (uncredited)
- Destry (1954) (uncredited)
- The Long Gray Line (1955) (uncredited)
- Prince of Players (1955) (uncredited)
- Battle Cry (1955) (uncredited)
- Tall Man Riding (1955) (uncredited)
- Seven Cities of Gold (1955) (uncredited)
- Ain't Misbehavin' (1955) (uncredited)
- Sincerely Yours (1955) (uncredited)
- The Kettles in the Ozarks (1956) (uncredited)
- A Cry in the Night (1956) (uncredited)
- The Girl He Left Behind (1956) (uncredited)
- Home Before Dark (1958) (uncredited)
- Auntie Mame (1958) (uncredited)
- The Young Philadelphians (1959) (uncredited)

1960s

- Sergeant Rutledge (1960) (uncredited)
- Sunrise at Campobello (1960) (uncredited)
- Jack the Giant Killer (1962) (uncredited)
- Critic's Choice (1963) (uncredited)
- Dead Ringer (1964) (uncredited)
