= Alan Crosland Jr. =

American film editor and director (1918–2001)

- Born: Frederick Alan Crosland Jr. 19 July 1918; Philadelphia, Pennsylvania, U.S.
- Died: December 18, 2001 (aged 83); Palm Desert, California, U.S.
- Occupations: Director; editor
- Years active: 1944-1986
- Spouses: Eileen Florence Dougherty (m. 1940; div. 1955); Bettie Jane Brown (m. 1957; div. 1962); Leatrice Bernard (m. 1963; div. 1971); Donna Ruth Hanor (m. 1972; div. 1978); Jean Margaret Smith (m. 1982; died 1993); Martha Villasenor (m. 1998)
- Children: 3
- Parents: Alan Crosland (father); Juanita Fletcher (mother)

Frederick Alan Crosland Jr. (June 19, 1918 – December 18, 2001) was a prolific director and editor of film and television from the 1940s to the 1980s. Crosland directed nearly 70 films and television episodes between 1954 and 1985. The son of noted director Alan Crosland, he is best known for directing the two-part pilot of The Bionic Woman in 1976 and episodes of The Twilight Zone in 1963. Crosland served in the US Navy.

== Biography ==
Crosland was born in Philadelphia, Pennsylvania on 19 July 1918 to Frederick Alan Crosland and Juanita Fletcher. In 1927, Crosland's mother was granted custody following his parents' divorce. According to the terms of the divorce, Crosland's father agreed to fund his education as well as a monthly child support payment. Between 1940 and his death in 2001, Crosland was married 5 times, 3 of which ended in divorce. Crosland died on 18 December 2001 in Palm Desert, California.

== Filmography ==
=== Feature films ===
| Year | Title | Role | Ref. |
|---|---|---|---|
| 1961 | Fury River | Director | |
| 1960 | Natchez Trace | Director | |
| 1958 | All Mine to Give | Editing Supervisor | |
| 1958 | The Last of the Fast Guns | Editor | |
| 1957 | Sweet Smell of Success | Editing Supervisor | |
| 1955 | Marty | Editing Supervisor | |
| 1954 | Vera Cruz | Editing Supervisor | |
| 1954 | Apache | Editing Supervisor | |
| 1953 | Blowing Wild | Director | |
| 1953 | The Jazz Singer | Editing Supervisor | |
| 1952 | The Winning Team | Editor | |
| 1952 | Room for One More | Editor | |
| 1952 | The Iron Mistress | Editor | |
| 1951 | Tomorrow Is Another Day (1951 film) | Editor | |
| 1951 | Come Fill the Cup | Editor | |
| 1951 | Operation Pacific | Editor | |
| 1950 | The Flame and the Arrow | Editor | |
| 1950 | The Breaking Point | Editor | |
| 1950 | Young Man with a Horn | Editor | |
| 1949 | Adventures of Don Juan | Editor | |
| 1949 | Task Force | Editor | |
| 1948 | Silver River | Editor | |
| 1947 | The Unfaithful | Editor | |
| 1946 | Deception | Editor | |
| 1945 | Pillow to Post | Editor | |
| 1944 | The Very Thought of You | Editor | |

=== Short films ===
| Year | Title | Role | Ref. |
|---|---|---|---|
| 1944 | United States Coast Guard Band | Editor | |
| 1944 | The Birds and the Beasts Were There | Editor | |
