= Stallion Road =

1947 film by Raoul Walsh, James V. Kern

- Directed by: James V. Kern; Raoul Walsh (uncredited)
- Written by: Stephen Longstreet
- Produced by: Alex Gottlieb
- Starring: Ronald Reagan; Alexis Smith; Zachary Scott; Peggy Knudsen; Patti Brady; Harry Davenport
- Cinematography: Arthur Edeson
- Edited by: David Weisbart
- Music by: Frederick Hollander
- Production company: Warner Bros. Pictures
- Distributed by: Warner Bros. Pictures
- Release date: April 12, 1947
- Running time: 97 minutes
- Country: United States
- Language: English
- Box office: $2,350,000 (US rentals)

Stallion Road is a 1947 American neo-Western drama film directed by James V. Kern, written by Stephen Longstreet, and starring Ronald Reagan, Alexis Smith, Zachary Scott, Peggy Knudsen, Patti Brady and Harry Davenport. It was released by Warner Bros. Pictures on April 12, 1947.

== Plot ==
Based on the novel and screenplay by Stephen Longstreet, this film depicts the romance which flowers between a breezy young veterinarian (Ronald Reagan), and a lady who runs a breeding farm (Alexis Smith). The two horse-loving characters appear to be bound for an inevitable love story. And a friend of the vet (Zachary Scott), who also fancies the lady, quite obviously hasn't a chance. But then, in a moment of crisis, when the favorite mare of the lady is at death's door, the vet doesn't respond to her summons. He is off vaccinating a herd of cows which is suddenly and alarmingly threatened with the dreaded anthrax disease. And that, it seems, is an incident which the lady takes very personally: she gives the vet the cold shoulder and throws herself into the arms of his pal. Eventually, things come around when the vet contracts anthrax himself (after pulling the lady's herd of horses out of danger with a new serum he has found) and she realizes that she still loves him and that she has to save him at all costs. So, she gives him the anthrax serum, and luckily, he pulls through.

== Cast ==
- Ronald Reagan as Larry Hanrahan
- Alexis Smith as Rory Teller
- Zachary Scott as Stephen Purcell
- Peggy Knudsen as Daisy Otis
- Patti Brady as Chris Teller
- Harry Davenport as Dr. Stevens
- Angela Greene as Lana Rock
- Frank Puglia as Pelon
- Ralph Byrd as Richmond Mallard
- Lloyd Corrigan as Ben Otis
- Fernando Alvarado as Chico
- Matthew Boulton as Joe Beasley
- Creighton Hale as Party Guest (uncredited)
- Jack Mower as Jack (uncredited)

== Production ==
The story was originally bought as a vehicle for Alan Ladd.
