= Frank Magee =

American film editor (1889–1971)

- Born: May 14, 1889
- Died: February 19, 1971 (aged 81)
- Occupation: Film editor

Frank Magee (May 14, 1889 – February 19, 1971) was an American film editor.

== Partial filmography ==
- Alias the Doctor (1932)
- The Singer of Naples (1935)
- Smart Blonde (1937)
- Dance, Charlie, Dance (1937)
- The Adventurous Blonde (1937)
- Nancy Drew, Detective (1938)
- Over the Wall (1938)
- Broadway Musketeers (1938)
- Mystery House (1938)
- Mr. Bill (1938)
- Smashing the Money Ring (1939)
- Sweepstakes Winner (1939)
- Everybody's Hobby (1939)
- Devil's Island (1939)
- Calling All Husbands (1940)
- Murder in the Air (1940)
- Always a Bride (1940)
- Father is a Prince (1940)
- Money and the Woman (1940)
- Father's Son (1941)
- International Squadron (1941)
- You're in the Army Now (1941)
- Strange Alibi (1941)
- Across the Pacific (1942)
- I Was Framed (1942)
- You Can't Escape Forever (1942)
- The Desert Song (1943)
- Christmas in Connecticut (1945)
- Danger Signal (1945)
- The Beast with Five Fingers (1946)
- Love and Learn (1947)
- Whiplash (1948)
- The Big Punch (1948)
- Flaxy Martin (1949)
- Colt .45 (1950)
- This Side of the Law (1950)
- Return of the Frontiersman (1950)
- The Great Jewel Robber (1950)
