= Alexis Smith =

American actress (1921–1993)

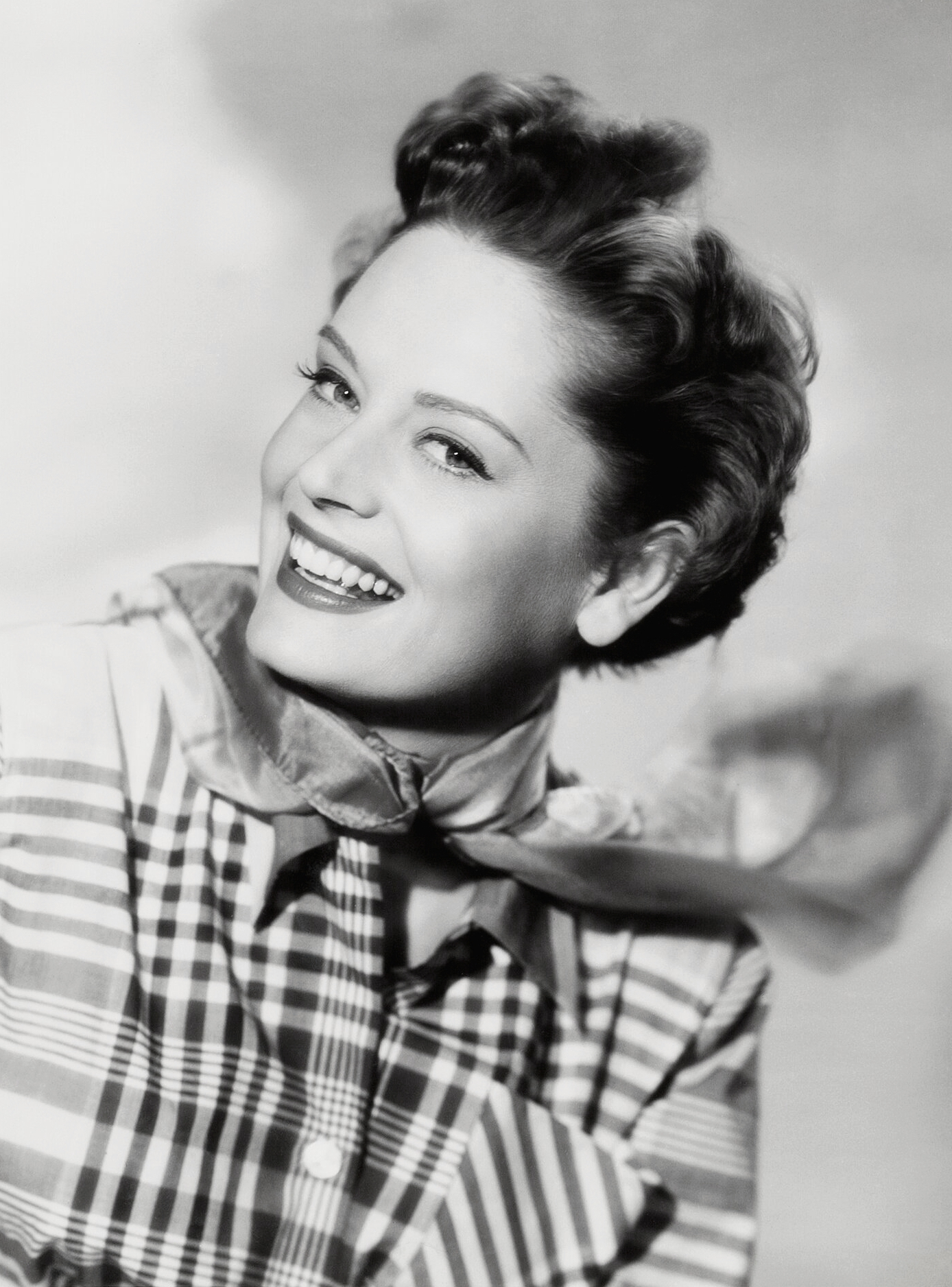
- Alexis Smith in 1951
- Born: Margaret Alexis Fitzsimmons Smith; June 8, 1921; Penticton, British Columbia, Canada
- Died: June 9, 1993 (aged 72); Los Angeles, California, U.S.
- Education: Los Angeles City College
- Occupations: Actress; pin-up girl; singer
- Years active: 1940–1993
- Spouse: Craig Stevens (m. 1944)
- Awards: Tony Award for Best Actress in a Musical

Margaret Alexis Fitzsimmons Smith (June 8, 1921 – June 9, 1993) was an American actress, pin-up girl and singer. She appeared in several major Hollywood films in the 1940s and had a notable career on Broadway in the 1970s, winning a Tony Award in 1972 for the Stephen Sondheim-James Goldman musical Follies.

== Early life ==
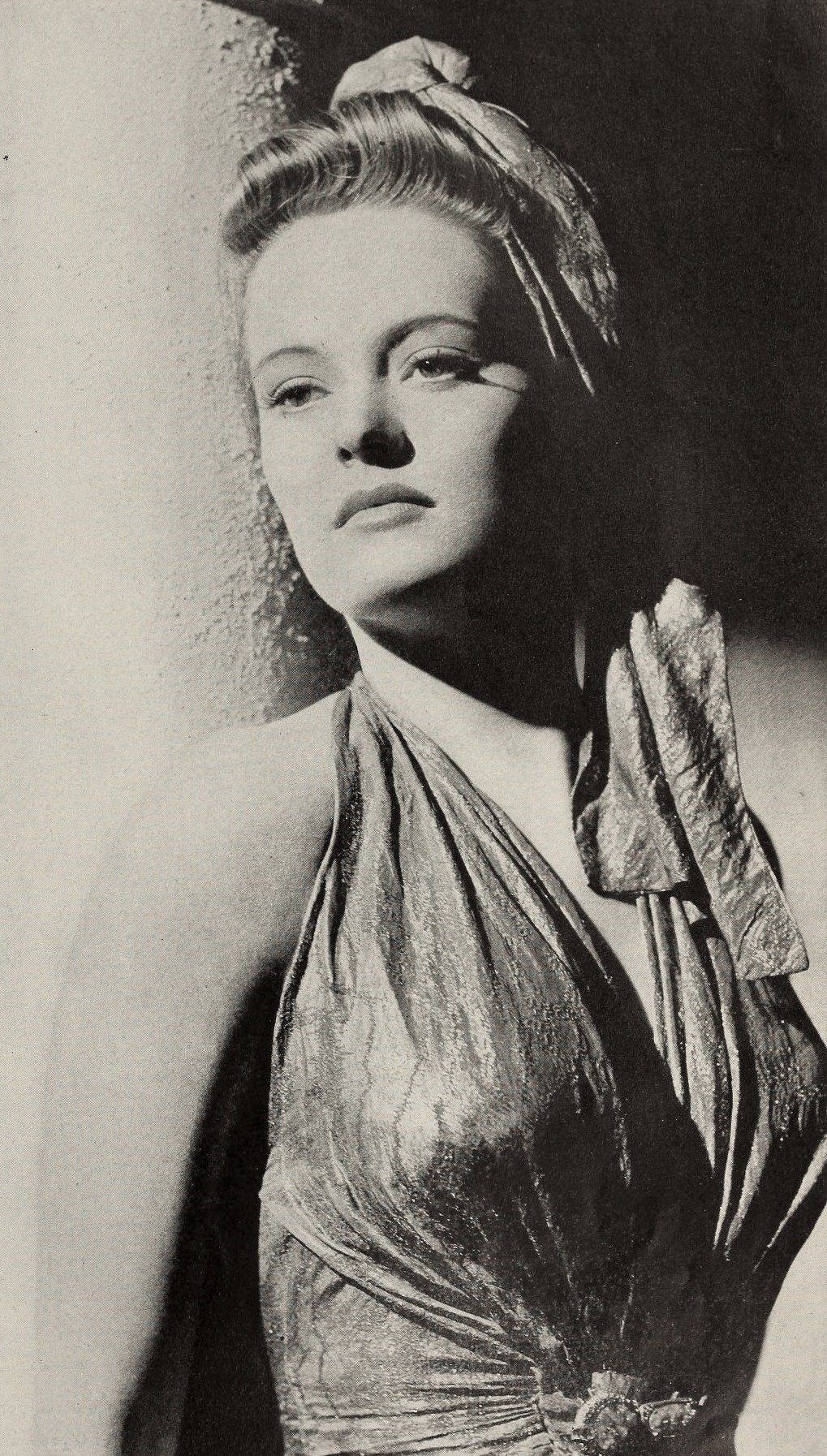
Smith in 1943

Smith was born in Penticton, British Columbia, the only child of Gladys Mabel Smith (née Fitzsimmons; a Canadian) and Alexander Smith (a Scot). Her family moved to Los Angeles when she was about a year old. Her parents both became naturalized U.S. citizens in 1939, through which she derived her United States citizenship. She grew up in Los Angeles, attending Hollywood High School along with other future talents, including actress Nanette Fabray. Smith made her professional debut performing ballet at the Hollywood Bowl. She was discovered in 1940 at Los Angeles City College, acting in a school production, by a Warner Bros. talent scout. She was in the college's theatrical training program and graduated with a degree in drama.

== Warner Bros ==
=== Early roles ===
After being discovered by a talent scout while attending college, Smith was signed to a contract by Warner Bros. Her early film roles were uncredited bit parts in films like Lady with Red Hair (1940), She Couldn't Say No (1940), Flight from Destiny (1941), The Great Mr. Nobody (1941), Here Comes Happiness (1941), Affectionately Yours (1941), Singapore Woman (1941), Passage from Hong Kong (1941) and Three Sons o' Guns (1941). Her first credited role was in the feature film Dive Bomber (1941), playing the female lead opposite Errol Flynn. It was a "decorative" part but the film was very successful. Warners decided to build her up as a star. She had a support role in The Smiling Ghost (1941) and appeared with her future husband Craig Stevens in Steel Against the Sky (1941), the first time she was top billed.

=== Stardom ===
Smith co starred opposite Errol Flynn in Gentleman Jim (1942), one of the most popular movies of the year. Her lead appearance in The Constant Nymph (1943) was well-received and led to bigger parts.

After a cameo dancing in Thank Your Lucky Stars (1943), Smith appeared opposite Fredric March in The Adventures of Mark Twain (1944), and starred alongside Ann Sheridan in The Doughgirls (1944). She had another cameo in Hollywood Canteen (1944) then co starred with Jack Benny in The Horn Blows at Midnight (1945).

Smith co-starred with Humphrey Bogart in Conflict (1945) and Robert Alda in the George Gershwin biopic Rhapsody In Blue (1945). She liked her part in the latter because "while a heavy of sorts I get to do the unexpected."

She was reunited with Flynn in San Antonio (1945) in which she sang a special version of the popular ballad "Some Sunday Morning"; the movie was a huge hit.

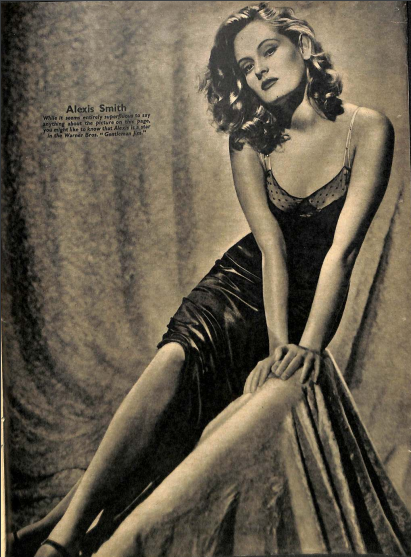
Alexis Smith pin-up girl, Yank, the Army Weekly 1943

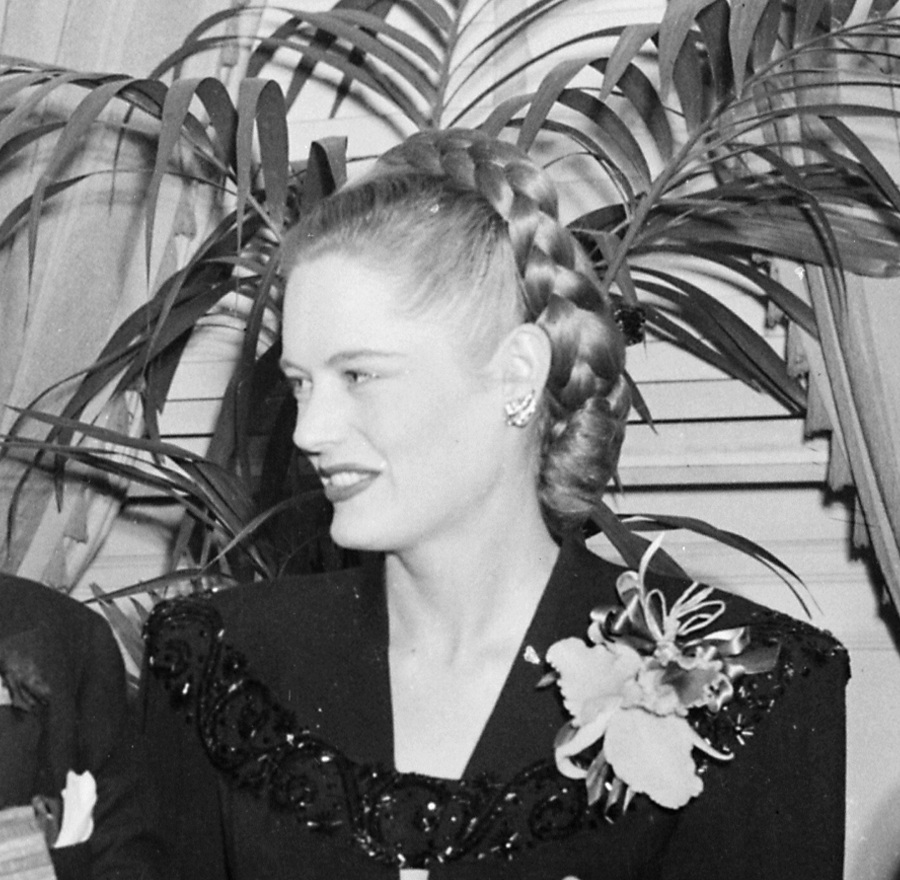
1946 photo

Smith appeared with Sheridan again in One More Tomorrow (1946) then Cary Grant in a sanitized, fictionalized version of the life of Cole and Linda Porter in Night and Day (1946); the latter was another box office success.

Smith appeared alongside Eleanor Parker and Paul Henreid in Of Human Bondage (1946), then did a second film with Bogart, The Two Mrs. Carrolls (1947); Hedda Hopper described the latter as "a typical Alexis Smith role". She later said of her Warners years "more often than not I played the other woman."

Smith made Stallion Road (1948) with Ronald Reagan and The Woman in White (1948) with Parker. She was top billed in The Decision of Christopher Blake (1948) which was announced as an attempt to change her image instead of being just "a mirror to reflect others' emotions".

She co starred with Dane Clark in Whiplash (1948), was Joel McCrea's leading lady in South of St. Louis (1949) then worked with Zachary Scott in One Last Fling (1949). MGM borrowed her for a Clark Gable film Any Number Can Play (1950) then she made one last movie with Flynn, Montana (1950).

In October 1949 Smith was granted a release from her contract with Warner Bros after refusing to be loaned out to Universal for a role in Shoplifter (1950) (she was replaced by Andrea King). She had been at the studio for nine years, having signed a four-year deal in 1946 that had the option of going to 1953.

== After Warners ==
Smith went to Universal to appear in Wyoming Mail (1950), a Western with Stephen McNally, and Undercover Girl (1950) a film noir. She played a shy aristocrat who is coached out of her staid shell by Bing Crosby to rival Jane Wyman in Paramount's Here Comes the Groom (1951), her favorite role. At Universal she made Cave of Outlaws (1951) with MacDonald Carey then back at Paramount was in The Turning Point (1952) with William Holden.

She received excellent reviews for playing Private Lives on stage with Victor Jory.

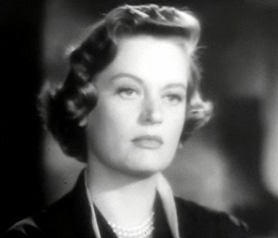
1953 film Split Second

Smith was in Split Second (1953) at RKO with McNally then went to England to star in The Sleeping Tiger (1954) with Dirk Bogarde for Joseph Losey.

In 1953 she appeared on stage in Bell Book and Candle with Victor Jory.

She began appearing in television on shows such as The Star and the Story, Stage 7, The 20th Century-Fox Hour, The Joseph Cotten Show: On Trial, Robert Montgomery Presents, Lux Video Theatre, Schlitz Playhouse, and The United States Steel Hour.

At Republic she made The Eternal Sea (1955) with Sterling Hayden. She had no offers so signed to go on tour with her husband in a production of Plain and Fancy which meant she missed out on roles in the films Serenade and The Toy Tiger.

Smith was in Beau James (1957) with Bob Hope, This Happy Feeling (1958) with Curt Jurgens and The Young Philadelphians with Paul Newman (1959).

She also appeared on a Dean Martin and Jerry Lewis radio (NBC) broadcast on January 25, 1952.

== Stage career ==
While Smith was under contract at Warner Bros., she met fellow actor Craig Stevens; they wed in 1944. In her later years, Smith toured in several stage hits including the 1955 National company of Plain and Fancy, Jean Kerr's Mary, Mary, Any Wednesday and Cactus Flower, all co-starring her husband.

In the 1960s Smith continued to work on television with roles in Adventures in Paradise, Michael Shayne, The Defenders, The Governor & J.J., and Marcus Welby, M.D..

Smith appeared on the cover of the May 3, 1971 issue of Time as the result of the critical acclaim for her singing and dancing role as Phyllis Rogers Stone in Hal Prince's Broadway production of Stephen Sondheim and James Goldman's Follies, which marked her long-awaited Broadway debut. In 1972, she won the Tony Award for Best Actress in a Musical for her performance.

Her stage career continued through the 1970s, with appearances in the 1973 all-star revival of The Women (1973), the short-lived re-working of William Inge's drama Picnic, re-titled Summer Brave (1975), and the ill-fated musical Platinum (1978), which earned Smith another Tony nomination for her performance but closed after a brief run.

She starred in several regional productions of Applause and then toured for more than a year as the madam in The Best Little Whorehouse in Texas, including a seven-month run in Los Angeles.

She continued to appear on TV in movies like Nightside and shows such as The Lives of Benjamin Franklin. She also performed in nightclubs.

== Later work ==
Smith returned to the big screen with star billing at the age of 54 in Jacqueline Susann's Once Is Not Enough (1975) opposite Kirk Douglas, followed by The Little Girl Who Lives Down the Lane with Martin Sheen and Jodie Foster the following year and Casey's Shadow with Walter Matthau in 1978. She and her husband appeared in Losey's The Trout (1982).

One of her later film roles came in 1986, again with Douglas when he reunited with frequent co-star Burt Lancaster for the comedy Tough Guys. Smith had a recurring role on the television series Dallas as the mentally unstable Lady Jessica Montford in 1984, and again in 1990. She starred in the short-lived 1988 series Hothouse, and was nominated for an Emmy Award for her guest appearance on Cheers in 1990. Her last film role was in The Age of Innocence (1993).

== Death ==
Alexis Smith died of brain cancer in Los Angeles on June 9, 1993, the day after her 72nd birthday. She had no children; her sole survivor was her husband of 49 years, actor Craig Stevens. Smith's final film, The Age of Innocence (1993), was released shortly after her death. Her body was cremated and her ashes were scattered over the Pacific Ocean.

== Filmography ==
=== Film ===
Film
Year	Title	Role	Notes
1940	Alice in Movieland	Guest at Carlo's	Short, Uncredited
1940	Lady with Red Hair	Girl at Wedding	Uncredited
1940	She Couldn't Say No	Phone Gossip #4	Uncredited
1941	Flight from Destiny	Girl	Uncredited
1941	The Great Mr. Nobody	Woman in office	Uncredited
1941	Here Comes Happiness	Blonde	Uncredited
1941	Affectionately Yours	Bridesmaid	Uncredited
1941	Singapore Woman	Miss Oswald	Uncredited
1941	Three Sons o' Guns	Actress	Uncredited
1941	Passage from Hong Kong	Nightclub dancer	Uncredited
1941	The Smiling Ghost	Elinor Bentley	with Wayne Morris and Brenda Marshall
1941	Steel Against the Sky	Helen Powers	with Lloyd Nolan and Craig Stevens
1941	Dive Bomber	Mrs. Linda Fisher	1 of 4 with Errol Flynn
1942	Gentleman Jim	Victoria Ware	2 of 4 with Errol Flynn
1943	The Constant Nymph	Florence Creighton	with Charles Boyer and Joan Fontaine
1943	Thank Your Lucky Stars	Herself	
1944	The Adventures of Mark Twain	Olivia Langdon Clemens	With Fredric March
1944	The Doughgirls	Nan Curtiss Dillon	with Ann Sheridan and Jane Wyman
1944	Hollywood Canteen	Herself	
1945	The Horn Blows at Midnight	Elizabeth	With Jack Benny
1945	Conflict	Evelyn Turner	1 of 2 with Humphrey Bogart
1945	Rhapsody in Blue	Christine Gilbert	with Robert Alda and Joan Leslie
1945	San Antonio	Jeanne Star	3 of 4 with Errol Flynn
1946	One More Tomorrow	Cecelia Henry	with Ann Sheridan and Dennis Morgan
1946	Night and Day	Linda Lee Porter	With Cary Grant
1946	Of Human Bondage	Nora Nesbitt	with Paul Henreid and Eleanor Parker
1947	The Two Mrs. Carrolls	Cecily Latham	2 of 2 with Humphrey Bogart and Barbara Stanwyck
1947	Stallion Road	Rory Teller	With Ronald Reagan
1947	Always Together	The Bride	Uncredited
1948	The Woman in White	Marian Halcombe	with Sidney Greenstreet and Eleanor Parker
1948	The Decision of Christopher Blake	Evelyn Blake	with Ted Donaldson
1948	Whiplash	Laurie Durant	with Dane Clark
1949	South of St. Louis	Rouge de Lisle	with Joel McCrea
1949	Any Number Can Play	Lon Kyng	With Clark Gable
1949	One Last Fling	Olivia Pearce	with Zachary Scott
1950	Montana	Maria Singleton	4 of 4 with Errol Flynn
1950	Wyoming Mail	Mary Williams	with Stephen McNally
1950	Undercover Girl	Christine Miller	with Scott Brady and Gladys George
1951	Here Comes the Groom	Winifred Stanley	With Bing Crosby and Jane Wyman
1951	Cave of Outlaws	Elizabeth Trent	with Macdonald Carey
1952	The Turning Point	Amanda Waycross	With William Holden
1953	Split Second	Kay Garven	with Stephen McNally and Jan Sterling
1954	The Sleeping Tiger	Glenda Esmond	with Dirk Bogarde
1955	The Eternal Sea	Sue Hoskins	with Sterling Hayden
1957	Beau James	Allie Walker	With Bob Hope
1958	This Happy Feeling	Nita Hollaway	Directed by Blake Edwards; with Curt Jurgens and Debbie Reynolds
1959	The Young Philadelphians	Carol Wharton	With Paul Newman
1974	Intriga de otros mundos		
1975	Once Is Not Enough	Deirdre Milford Granger	With Kirk Douglas
1976	The Little Girl Who Lives Down the Lane	Mrs. Hallet	With Jodie Foster
1978	Casey's Shadow	Sarah Blue	With Walter Matthau
1982	The Trout (aka La Truite)	Gloria	with Isabelle Huppert and Craig Stevens
1986	Tough Guys	Belle	With Burt Lancaster and Kirk Douglas
1993	The Age of Innocence	Luisa van der Luyden	Directed by Martin Scorsese (final film role)

=== Television ===
Television
Year	Title	Role	Notes
1955	Stage 7	Caroline Taylor	1 episode
1956	The 20th Century Fox Hour	Emily Hefferan	1 episode
1956	The Joseph Cotten Show	Libby Wilson	1 episode, "We Who Love Her"
1958	Schlitz Playhouse of Stars	Vivian Braxton	1 episode
1959	Adventures in Paradise	Loraine Lucas	1 episode
1960	Michael Shayne	Nora Carroll	1 episode
1965	The Defenders	Carol Defoe	1 episode
1970	The Governor & J.J.	Leslie Carroll	1 episode
1971	Marcus Welby, M.D.	Evie Craig	1 episode (co-starring Craig Stevens)
1972	Bob Hope Special	Guest Star	airing October 5, 1972
1973	Nightside	Smitty	Television movie Alternative title: A Very Special Place
1982	The Love Boat	Amanda Drake	Season 6: Episodes 8 & 9. November 13, 1982 "The Spoonmaker Diamond"/"Papa Doc"/"The Role Model"/"Julie's Tycoon – Parts 1 & 2"
1984	Dallas	Lady Jessica Farlow Montford	Season 7: Episodes 24–30
1984	The Love Boat	Angela Lovett	Season 7: Episodes 25 & 26. May 5, 1984 "Dreamboat"/"Gopher, Isaac & the Starlet"/"The Parents"/"The Importance of Being Johnny"/"Julie and the Producer – Parts 1 & 2"
1985	A Death in California	Honey Niven	Television miniseries
1985	The Love Boat	Justina Downey	Season 9: Episodes 4 & 5. November 2, 1985 "The Villa"/"The Racer's Edge"/"Love or Money"/"The Accident – Parts 1 & 2"
1986	Dress Gray	Mrs. Iris Rylander	Television movie
1988	Hothouse	Lily Garrison Shannon	7 episodes
1988	Marcus Welby, M.D.: A Holiday Affair	Tessa Menard	Television movie
1990	Dallas	Lady Jessica Farlow Montford	Season 13: Episodes 23, 24, 26, 27
1990	Lola	Phoebe	Television movie
1990	Cheers	Professor Alice Anne Volkman	1 episode, nominated for an Emmy

== Stage work ==
- Private Lives (1952)
- Bell, Book and Candle (1953)
- Plain and Fancy (1955 National Tour)
- Wonderful Town (1957)
- Mary, Mary (1965)
- Cactus Flower (1968 National Tour)
- Follies (1971)
- The Women (1973)
- Applause (1973)
- Summer Brave (1975)
- Platinum (1978)
- The Best Little Whorehouse in Texas (1979–80 National Tour)
- Pal Joey (1983)
- Nymph Errant (1989 Concert)

== Radio appearances ==
Year	Program	Episode/source
1944	Lux Radio Theatre	Old Acquaintance
1952	Lux Radio Theatre	Submarine Commander
