= Undercover Girl (1950 film) =

1950 film by Joseph Pevney

The Runaround
- Theatrical release poster
- Directed by: Joseph Pevney
- Screenplay by: Harry Essex
- Story by: Francis Rosenwald
- Produced by: Aubrey Schenck
- Starring: Alexis Smith; Scott Brady
- Cinematography: Carl Guthrie
- Edited by: Russell F. Schoengarth
- Color process: Black and white
- Production company: Universal Pictures
- Distributed by: Universal Pictures
- Release date: November 2, 1950
- Running time: 83 minutes
- Country: United States
- Language: English

Undercover Girl is a 1950 American crime film noir directed by Joseph Pevney and starring Alexis Smith and Scott Brady.

== Plot ==
Christine "Chris" Miller, a newly graduated New York policewoman, vows to finish the work of her murdered detective father by infiltrating the drug ring that killed him. Under an alias, she moves into a rough neighborhood, gains the trust of Moocher, a low‑level addict, and uses information from Liz Crow, a faded ex‑moll, to build herself a convincing cover.

Working her way up, Chris eventually reaches Doc Holmes, a doctor fronting for the gang, and Menig, a ruthless lieutenant, feeding intelligence back to Lieutenant Mike Trent while her suspicious targets and an intrusive boyfriend put her cover at risk. As suspicions close in, she helps set up a final sting—the ring leaders are exposed and captured, her father’s killer is unmasked, and Chris proves herself as a capable officer in a male‑dominated force.

== Cast ==
- Alexis Smith as Christine Miller
- Scott Brady as Lt. Michael Trent
- Richard Egan as Jess Faylen
- Gladys George as Liz Crow
- Edmond Ryan as Doc Holmes
- Gerald Mohr as Reed Menig
- Royal Dano as Moocher
- Harry Landers as Tully
- Connie Gilchrist as Captain Parker
- Angela Clarke as Babe
- Regis Toomey as "Butt" Miller
- Lynn Ainley as Pat Gibson
- Tris Coffin as Robbie (as Tristram Coffin)
- Lawrence Cregar as Murph
- Harold Gary as Wally
- Edwin Rand as Lew (as Ed Rand)
- Mel Archer as Collar

== Reception ==
In a contemporary review for The New York Times, critic Thomas M. Pryor wrote: "[T]here are no surprises in 'Undercover Girl.' The film details in interesting fashion, however, how the L.A. police help Chris to win the confidence of the smugglers as a big drug buyer from Chicago. Not so interesting are the climactic moments of the melodrama when a sleazy character discovers that Chris is a cop and tips off the gang. It might be interesting, just for the sake of change, to have a police plan work out so successfully that the gang could be apprehended without discovering the identity of the undercover agent. How about it, moviemakers?"

== See also ==
- List of American films of 1950
