= Maurice A. Hanline =

American poet

- Born: June 6, 1895; Baltimore, Maryland, U.S.
- Died: September 1964 (aged 69)
- Education: Baltimore City College
- Occupations: Playwright; poet; novelist; screenwriter
- Spouse: Patricia O'Brien

Maurice A. Hanline (June 6, 1895 - September 1964) was an American playwright, poet, novelist and screenwriter. He worked as a screenwriter for Metro-Goldwyn-Mayer for more than three decades.

== Early life ==
Hanline was born in 1895 in Baltimore, Maryland. He graduated from Baltimore City College.

== Career ==
Hanline staged his own play, The Woman of Samaria, in Baltimore in 1921. He worked in publishing in New York City for Horace Liveright in the 1920s, and he became a published poet. In 1930, he began working as a screenwriter for Metro-Goldwyn-Mayer in Los Angeles. He published his first novel, Years of Indiscretion in 1935. He worked for MGM until his death.

Movies he worked on include Lottery Lover (1935), Four Wives (1939), and Steel Against the Sky (1941).

== Personal life and death ==
Hanline married Patricia O'Brien. He died in 1964, at age 69.
