= Frank P. Rosenberg =

American film producer (1913–2002)

- Born: November 22, 1913; Brooklyn, New York, U.S.
- Died: October 18, 2002 (aged 88)
- Occupations: Film producer; studio executive

Frank P. Rosenberg (November 22, 1913 – October 18, 2002) was an American film producer and studio executive. Among his many credits are the films, One-Eyed Jacks, Where The Sidewalk Ends, Critic's Choice, Madigan, The Reincarnation of Peter Proud and The Secret of Convict Lake.

== Early life ==
Born in Brooklyn, NY, Rosenberg began his interest in show business after his mother took him to his first Broadway play. His father ran a fashion company called Miller & Rosenberg. Miller was his partner and was the father of Arthur Miller, the American playwright who wrote "Death of a Salesman".

== Career ==
Rosenberg began his career in the shipping department of Columbia Studios in New York, before working his way to becoming the head of publicity and advertising at Columbia. In 1946, studio head, Harry Cohn transferred Rosenberg to Hollywood.

== Personal life ==
In 1953, Rosenberg married Maryanne Schaeffer (April 13, 1927 – October 22, 2013). They had 3 sons, John (b. 1953) a film editor, Daniel (1957–2001) an entertainment lawyer, and James (b. 1962) a forensic psychiatrist.
