= The Secret of Convict Lake =

1951 film by Michael Gordon

- Theatrical release poster
- Directed by: Michael Gordon
- Written by: Victor Trivas (adaptation)
- Screenplay by: Oscar Saul
- Based on: (from the story by); Anna Hunger; Jack Pollexfen
- Produced by: Frank P. Rosenberg
- Starring: Glenn Ford; Gene Tierney; Ethel Barrymore; Zachary Scott
- Cinematography: Leo Tover
- Edited by: James B. Clark
- Music by: Sol Kaplan
- Color process: Black and white
- Production company: Twentieth Century-Fox
- Distributed by: Twentieth Century-Fox
- Release date: August 3, 1951 (New York)
- Running time: 83 minutes
- Country: United States
- Language: English
- Box office: $1,350,000 (U.S. rentals)

The Secret of Convict Lake is a 1951 American Western film directed by Michael Gordon and starring Glenn Ford, Gene Tierney, Ethel Barrymore and Zachary Scott. The film is based on legends of Convict Lake, located in the Sierra Nevada mountain ranges of northern California and a short story by Anna Hunger and Jack Pollexfen. The film marks Ann Dvorak's final screen role.

== Plot ==
In 1871, six convicts escape from a Carson City prison. One of them freezes to death during a blizzard. The others—Canfield, Greer, Cockerell, Anderson and Maxwell—reach Lake Monte Diablo, where eight women live in a settlement while their men are away prospecting. Granny is the elder and the other women are Marcia, Rachel, Barbara, Susan, Harriet, Mary and Millie.

The frightened women permit the men to use an empty cabin. Granny hides all of the guns except one when they realize that the men are escaped convicts. The other convicts think that Canfield has returned to the area because had hidden money somewhere nearby. He had been convicted of killing a mine owner and $40,000 is missing.

Canfield learns that Marcia, to whom he is attracted, is engaged to be married to Rudy Schaeffer. Canfield claims that Schaeffer took the $40,000 and committed perjury to secure Canfield's conviction and death sentence. Canfield reveals that he has returned to kill Schaeffer.

After a barn catches fire and the convicts rescue the animals, the women treat them more in a kindlier manner. Canfield is trustworthy, but the other four continue plotting. Later, Canfield seizes Granny's gun. When Marcia rides away, Canfield finds her and they embrace and kiss. He tells her that Morgan, a mine owner, had swindled him. When he had come to talk to Morgan about it, Morgan pointed a gun at him, they scuffled and the gun fired, killing Morgan. Schaeffer witnessed the incident but claimed that Canfield had killed Morgan in cold blood so that Schaeffer could keep the money. However, Marcia refuses to believe it.

While Canfield and Marcia are away, Greer charms Rachel, Schaeffer's unmarried sister, into revealing where Granny hid the other guns. Greer, Cockerell and Anderson arm themselves and wait for Canfield. On the way home, the men spot a wanted poster in a saloon and race back to their families.

Maxwell, a psychotic and the youngest convict, cannot control his murderous impulses whenever someone resists him. He takes Barbara on a long walk and tries to kiss her. Barbara resists and he brandishes a machete. Canfield, riding back with Marcia, hears Barbara's cries and arrives in time to intervene. In the ensuing struggle, Maxwell stabs Canfield in the shoulder. Maxwell chases Barbara, but the other women, who are searching for her, kill him with a pitchfork. Greer and his men take Canfield and his gun.

Rachel finds the $40,000 in a trunk belonging to her brother. She gives the money to Marcia to give to Greer to stop beating Canfield and leave. However, Schaeffer and the other men return and confront the convicts. Cockerell and Anderson are shot and Greer flees up the mountain but drops the $40,000. When he tries to pick it up, he is shot and falls to his death. Schaeffer, knowing that his secret has been uncovered, tries to sneak away. Canfield holds Schaeffer at gunpoint and demands that he confess when the rest of the men return. As Marcia approaches, Schaeffer draws his gun, forcing Canfield to shoot him. Canfield then gives his gun to Marcia.

When the sheriff and his posse arrive and inquire about the five remaining fugitives, Granny shows him five newly dug graves (the four convicts and Schaeffer).

The narrator states that the story is true and reveals that the lake was renamed Convict Lake.

== Cast ==
- Glenn Ford as Jim Canfield
- Gene Tierney as Marcia Stoddard
- Ethel Barrymore as Granny
- Zachary Scott as Johnny Greer
- Ann Dvorak as Rachel Shaeffer
- Barbara Bates as Barbara Purcell
- Cyril Cusack as Edward 'Limey' Cockerell
- Richard Hylton as Clyde Maxwell
- Helen Westcott as Susan Haggerty
- Jeanette Nolan as Harriet Purcell
- Ruth Donnelly as Mary Fancher
- Harry Benjamin Carter as Rudy Schaeffer

== Reception ==
In a contemporary review for The New York Times, critic Howard Thompson wrote: "In 'The Secret of Convict Lake' ... Twentieth Century-Fox has packaged a pretty good cast and a fairly provocative plot and has aimed for one of those psychological, adult Westerns. The result, unfortunately, is more or less a dead horse, flies included." Thompson also mentioned that some of the dialogue elicited unintended laughter from the theater audience.
