= Natchez Trace (film) =

1960 film by Alan Crosland, Jr.

- Directed by: Alan Crosland Jr.
- Screenplay by: D. D. Beauchamp; William R. Cox
- Produced by: Lloyd Royal; Tom Garraway
- Starring: Zachary Scott; Marcia Henderson; William Campbell
- Production company: Panorama Pictures Corp.
- Release date: September 1, 1960
- Running time: 80 minutes
- Country: United States
- Language: English

Natchez Trace (also known as Bandits of the Natchez Trace) is a 1960 American film starring Zachary Scott, Marcia Henderson, and William Campbell, produced by Lloyd Royal and Tom Garraway, and directed by Alan Crosland Jr. The now-lost film was based on a novel of the same name by William Bradford Huie.

== Plot ==
The film takes place in the 1820s focusing on the exploits of John Murrell, a slave trader and bandit who worked the central part of the Natchez Trace in the 1820s and 1830s. The plot centers around the revenge against Murrell by a bank clerk following the abduction of his fiancé and murder of her father. Reportedly, Mississippi Governor James P. Coleman declined an offer to play Governor Gerard C. Brandon in the film.

== Production ==
The film premiered in Waynesboro, Tennessee, near where filming took place in Perry County, Tennessee and Wayne County, Tennessee in 1957. It is possible that some filming took place in or near Meridian, Mississippi, where the production company was headquartered.

Prior to filming commencing, both the film's director and second lead were swapped. Actor Gene Nelson was originally cast as the film's second lead. However, the role was given to William Campbell after Nelson was hospitalized following an injury sustained when a horse fell on him during rehearsals near Hohenwald, Tennessee. As a result of the injury, Nelson sued the production company for $150,000 and was awarded $72,765 in 1961 ($783,966 in 2025). Director Ray Nazarro was originally slated to direct the film, however a scheduling conflict precluded his participation, causing the producers to offer the job to Crosland.
