= Zachary Scott =

American actor (1914–1965)

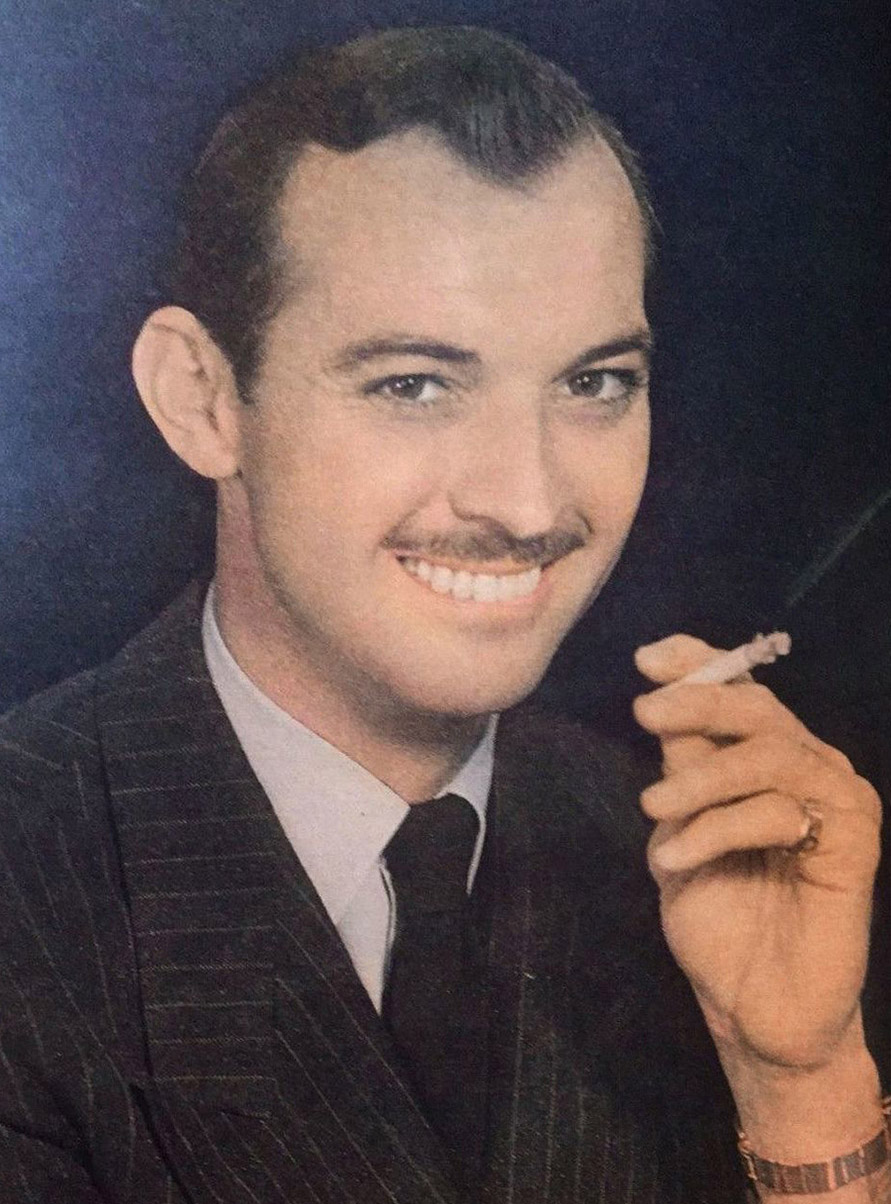
- Scott in a 1948 issue of New York Sunday News
- Born: February 21, 1914; Austin, Texas, U.S.
- Died: October 3, 1965 (aged 51); Austin, Texas, U.S.
- Years active: 1941–1965
- Spouses: Elaine Anderson (m. 1934; div. 1950) Ruth Ford (m. 1952)

Zachary Scott (February 21, 1914 – October 3, 1965) was an American actor who was known for his roles as villains and "mystery men".

== Early life ==
Scott was born in Austin, Texas, the son of Sallie Lee (Masterson) and Zachary Thomson Scott, a doctor.

Scott intended to follow his father into medicine, but after attending the University of Texas at Austin, he dropped out at age 19 and worked as a seaman on an England-bound freighter. There he appeared in almost two dozen repertory theatre productions in 18 months. When he returned to Texas, he began to act in local theater productions.

== Career ==
=== Broadway ===
Alfred Lunt and Lynn Fontanne met Scott and his wife Elaine Anderson in Austin, Texas, where Scott was again attending the University of Texas, and then wrote to Lawrence Langer about summer jobs for both at the Westport Playhouse in Connecticut, which led to Scott's engagements in New York. He left the university without completing his degree and made his debut in a 1941 revival of Ah, Wilderness! with a small role as a bartender. He was also in The Damask Cheek (1942), The Rock (1943), and Those Endearing Young Charms (1943).

=== Warner Bros. ===
Jack L. Warner saw Scott perform in Those Endearing Young Charms and signed him to his first film contract, which led to his screen debut in The Mask of Dimitrios (1944).

J. Carrol Naish, Scott and Norman Lloyd in The Southerner (1945)

Scott was one of the many Warners stars who had small roles in Hollywood Canteen (1944). He was loaned to United Artists to play the lead in The Southerner (1945) directed by Jean Renoir.

Back at Warners, Scott was cast in Mildred Pierce (1945) and received much acclaim for his performance as the duplicitous lover of both Joan Crawford and her daughter, and his mysterious murder forms the basis of the plot and frames the film's opening and closing. Variety noted that Scott "makes the most of his character" in "a talented performance."

Scott co-starred with Faye Emerson in Danger Signal (1945) and was with Janis Paige and Dane Clark in Her Kind of Man (1946). In 1946, exhibitors voted Scott the third most promising "star of tomorrow".

Scott supported Ann Sheridan in The Unfaithful (1947) and Ronald Reagan and Alexis Smith in Stallion Road (1947). MGM borrowed him to support Lana Turner and Spencer Tracy in Cass Timberlane (1947).

He had the lead in a noir for Eagle-Lion Films, Ruthless (1948), then returned to Warners for Whiplash (1948) with Clark. He supported Virginia Mayo in Flaxy Martin (1949) and Joel McCrea in the independent South of St. Louis (1949). He was reunited with Crawford in Flamingo Road (1949).

Warners tried Scott in One Last Fling (1949), a comedy with Alexis Smith. He starred in some films outside the studio: Guilty Bystander (1950) and Shadow on the Wall (1950). At Warners, he supported Randolph Scott in Colt .45 (1950). He did Born to Be Bad (1950) for Nicholas Ray and Pretty Baby (1950) for Warners.

After being dropped by Warners, Scott appeared on a variety of television series such as Armstrong Circle Theatre (1950) and Pulitzer Prize Playhouse (1951). He did Lightning Strikes Twice (1951) for King Vidor and The Secret of Convict Lake (1951).

=== Leaving Warners ===
Scott's first film after he left Warners was Stronghold (1951) with Veronica Lake. He followed it with Let's Make It Legal (1951). He was on TV in Tales of Tomorrow (1951) and Betty Crocker Star Matinee (1952) and went to England to make Wings of Danger (1952).

In Hollywood, he was in Studio One in Hollywood (1953), and Medallion Theatre (1953) on TV, and Appointment in Honduras (1953), directed by Jacques Tourneur. He was in The Revlon Mirror Theater (1953), Chevron Theatre (1953), Suspense (1954), Schlitz Playhouse (1954), The Motorola Television Hour (1954), Campbell Summer Soundstage (1954), The United States Steel Hour (1954), Omnibus (1954), Climax! (1955), General Electric Theater (1955), Robert Montgomery Presents (1956, playing Philip Marlowe in a version of The Big Sleep), Science Fiction Theatre (1955), The Star and the Story (1956), Celebrity Playhouse (1956), Theatre Night (1957) and Pursuit (1958).

He made the occasional film such as Treasure of Ruby Hills (1955), Shotgun (1955), Flame of the Islands (1956), The Counterfeit Plan (1957), and Man in the Shadow (1957); the last two were shot in Britain.

Scott returned to Broadway with Requiem for a Nun (1959).

=== Later roles ===
Scott was in The Young One (1960) directed by Luis Buñuel. He guest starred on The Chevy Mystery Show (1960), Alfred Hitchcock Presents (1960) and Diagnosis: Unknown (1960). In 1961, he portrayed White Eyes, a Native American Chief, in the Rawhide episode "Incident Before Black Pass".

He was in the film Natchez Trace (1960) and had roles in The DuPont Show of the Month (1961), Play of the Week (1961), The New Breed (1961), The Defenders (1961) and The DuPont Show of the Week (1962).

Scott's last roles included It's Only Money (1962) with Jerry Lewis, the TV movie The Expendables (1962), and episodes of The Doctors and the Nurses (1962) and The Rogues (1965). He returned to Broadway for A Rainy Day in Newark (1963) by Howard Teichmann. He then moved back to Austin.

== Personal life ==
During his time at Warner's, Scott and his first wife Elaine socialized regularly with Angela Lansbury and her husband Richard Cromwell. Elaine Scott had met Zachary Scott in Austin and she made a name for herself behind the scenes on Broadway as stage manager for the original production of Oklahoma!.

The Scotts had one child together.

In 1950, Scott was involved in a rafting accident. Also during that year, he and Elaine divorced; she later married writer John Steinbeck. Possibly as a result of these developments or due to a box-office slump, Scott succumbed to depression, which affected his acting for Warners.

Scott married his second wife, actress Ruth Ford, in 1952. Scott adopted her daughter from Ford's previous marriage to Peter van Eyck.

== Death ==
Scott died on October 3, 1965, from a malignant brain tumor at the home of his mother in Austin, Texas at the age of 51.

== Legacy ==
Scott has a star at 6349 Hollywood Boulevard in the Motion Pictures section of the Hollywood Walk of Fame. It was dedicated on February 8, 1960.

In 1968, Austin renamed its civic center Zachary Scott Theatre Center in memory of the city's native son. Two streets in the Austin area are named in his memory: at the old airport Mueller Redevelopment and in unincorporated southeast Travis County.

Scott's family endowed two chairs at the University of Texas's theatre department in his name.

== Filmography ==
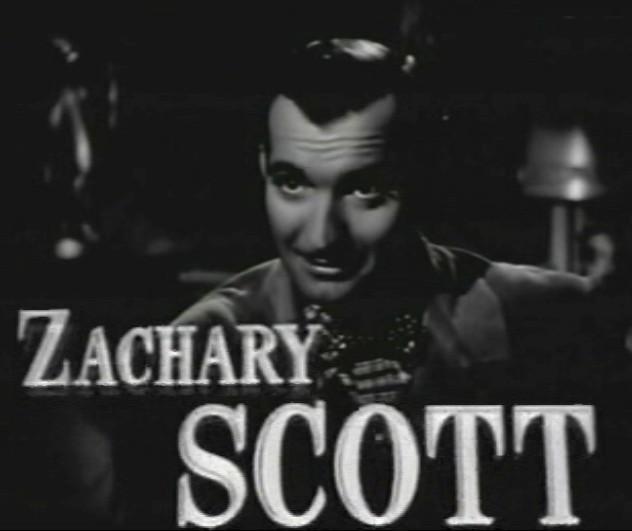
Scott in the trailer for the film Mildred Pierce (1945)

=== Film ===
| Year | Title | Role | Notes |
|---|---|---|---|
| 1944 | The Mask of Dimitrios | Dimitrios Makropoulos | |
| 1944 | Hollywood Canteen | Himself | |
| 1945 | The Southerner | Sam Tucker | |
| 1945 | Mildred Pierce | Monte Beragon | |
| 1945 | Danger Signal | Ronnie Mason | |
| 1946 | Her Kind of Man | Steve Maddux | |
| 1947 | Stallion Road | Stephen Purcell | |
| 1947 | The Unfaithful | Bob Hunter | |
| 1947 | Cass Timberlane | Bradd Criley | |
| 1948 | Ruthless | Horace Woodruff Vendig | |
| 1948 | Whiplash | Rex Durant | |
| 1949 | Flaxy Martin | Walter Colby | |
| 1949 | South of St. Louis | Charlie Burns | |
| 1949 | Flamingo Road | Fielding Carlisle | |
| 1949 | One Last Fling | Larry Pearce | |
| 1950 | Guilty Bystander | Max Thursday | |
| 1950 | Shadow on the Wall | David I. Starrling | |
| 1950 | Colt .45 | Jason Brett | |
| 1950 | Born to Be Bad | Curtis Carey | |
| 1950 | Pretty Baby | Barry Holmes | |
| 1951 | Lightning Strikes Twice | Harvey Fortescue Turner | |
| 1951 | The Secret of Convict Lake | Johnny Greer | |
| 1951 | Stronghold | Don Miguel Navarro | |
| 1951 | Let's Make It Legal | Victor Macfarland | |
| 1952 | Wings of Danger | Richard Van Ness | Alternate title: Dead on Course |
| 1953 | Appointment in Honduras | Harry Sheppard | |
| 1955 | Treasure of Ruby Hills | Ross Haney | |
| 1955 | Shotgun | Reb Carleton | |
| 1956 | Flame of the Islands | Wade Evans | |
| 1956 | Bandido! | Kennedy | |
| 1957 | The Counterfeit Plan | Max Brant | |
| 1957 | Man in the Shadow | John Lewis Sullivan | alternate title: Violent Stranger |
| 1960 | The Young One | Hap Miller | |
| 1960 | Natchez Trace | John A. Morrow / John Murrell | |
| 1962 | It's Only Money | Gregory DeWitt | |

=== Radio ===
| Year | Program | Episode/source |
|---|---|---|
| 1945 | Suspense | "Murder Off Key" |

=== Television ===
| Year | Title | Role | Notes |
|---|---|---|---|
| 1955 | Science Fiction Theater | | 2 episodes |
| 1956 | G.E. Summer Originals | | Episode: "The Unwilling Witness" |
| 1960 | Alfred Hitchcock Presents | Mr. Blake | Episode: "The Five-Forty-Eight" |
| 1961 | Rawhide | White Eyes | Episode: "Incident Before Black Pass" |

== See also ==
- List of notable brain tumor patients
