= Madigan =

1968 film by Don Siegel (as Donald Siegel)

- Directed by: Don Siegel (as Donald Siegel)
- Screenplay by: Howard Rodman (as Henri Simoun); Abraham Polonsky
- Based on: The Commissioner; 1962 novel by Richard Dougherty
- Produced by: Frank P. Rosenberg
- Starring: Richard Widmark; Henry Fonda; Inger Stevens; Harry Guardino; James Whitmore; Susan Clark; Michael Dunn; Don Stroud; Steve Ihnat
- Cinematography: Russell Metty
- Edited by: Milton Shifman
- Music by: Don Costa
- Production company: Universal Pictures
- Distributed by: Universal Pictures
- Release date: March 29, 1968
- Running time: 101 minutes
- Country: United States
- Language: English
- Box office: $1,100,000 (US/Canada rentals)

== See also ==
- List of American films of 1968

== Sources ==
- Kass, Judith M. (1975). Don Seigel: The Hollywood Professionals, Volume 4 (1975 ed.). New York: Tanvity Press. p. 207. ISBN 0-498-01665-X.
