= The Horn Blows at Midnight =

1945 film by Raoul Walsh

- Directed by: Raoul Walsh
- Screenplay by: Sam Hellman; James V. Kern
- Story by: Aubrey Wisberg
- Produced by: Mark Hellinger
- Starring: Jack Benny; Alexis Smith; Allyn Joslyn; Guy Kibbee
- Cinematography: Sidney Hickox
- Edited by: Irene Morra
- Music by: Franz Waxman
- Production company: Warner Bros. Pictures
- Distributed by: Warner Bros. Pictures
- Release date: April 20, 1945
- Running time: 78 minutes
- Country: United States
- Language: English
- Budget: $1,831,000
- Box office: $970,000

The Horn Blows at Midnight is a 1945 comedy fantasy film directed by Raoul Walsh, and starring Jack Benny.

Following its poor box-office, Benny often exploited the film's failure for laughs over the next 20 years in his radio and television comedy series The Jack Benny Program, making the film known to those audience members who had never seen it. The Horn Blows at Midnight was Benny's last feature film as a lead; he continued to do cameo appearances in films for many years.

== Plot ==
Athanael (Jack Benny), the third trumpet player in the orchestra of a late night radio show sponsored by Paradise Coffee (motto: "It's Heavenly"), falls asleep listening to the announcer, who is doing his best to prove it is "the coffee that makes you sleep". Athanael dreams he is an angel (junior grade) and a trumpeter in the orchestra of Heaven. Due to the praise of his girlfriend Elizabeth (Alexis Smith), the assistant of the deputy chief of the department of small planet management (Guy Kibbee), he is given the mission of destroying planet 339001 (Earth) and its troublesome inhabitants by blowing the "Last Trumpet" at exactly midnight, signaling the end of the world.

When he is deposited at the Hotel Universe via the building's elevator, he accidentally foils a robbery attempt by suave guest Archie Dexter (Reginald Gardiner) and his girlfriend accomplice, Fran Blackstone (Dolores Moran). Dexter blames Fran and breaks off their relationship. When Athanael prevents her attempt at suicide from the hotel's roof, he misses the deadline. Elizabeth persuades her boss to give him a second chance, and travels to Earth to inform him.

Complications arise when two fallen angels named Osidro (Allyn Joslyn) and Doremus (John Alexander), also guests at the hotel, recognize Athanael and learn of his assignment. They want to continue their pleasantly hedonistic life. While Athanael encounters trouble holding onto his trumpet by his inexperience with Earthly life, Osidro and Doremus hire Dexter to steal the instrument. Learning that Fran was rescued by Athanael, Dexter reconciles with her. Then, while she distracts the angel, Dexter's henchman Humphrey (Mike Mazurki) steals the trumpet.

Athanael, Elizabeth and her boss track the thieves to the roof. During a struggle, Athanael falls off the building, only to wake up from his dream.

== Cast ==
Many of the actors play dual roles, in Heaven and on Earth.

- Jack Benny as Athanael
- Alexis Smith as Elizabeth
- Dolores Moran as Violinist / Fran Blackstone
- Allyn Joslyn as Second Trumpeter / Osidro
- Reginald Gardiner as Composer / Archie Dexter
- Guy Kibbee as Radio Director / The Chief
- John Alexander as First Trumpeter / Doremus
- Franklin Pangborn as Radio Engineer / Sloan
- Margaret Dumont as Mme. Traviata / Miss Rodholder
- Robert Blake as Junior Pulplinsky (as Bobby Blake)
- Ethel Griffies as Lady Stover, a hotel guest annoyed at the frequent disappearance of the elevator
- Paul Harvey as Hotel Manager Thompson
- Mike Mazurki as Bass Player / Humphrey Rafferty
- Truman Bradley as Radio Announcer
- Jack Mower as Head Hotel Clerk (uncredited)
- Larry Steers as Hotel Guest (uncredited)

== Box office ==
According to Warner Bros. records, the film earned $895,000 domestically and $75,000 foreign.

== Reception ==
The New York Sun’s review was lukewarm: “The film is…usually mildly amusing. It never, in spite of every one’s best intentions, gets much funnier than that….It is a pleasant change for Mr. Benny, something far from his wisecracking radio self….The picture, never getting anywhere near the hilarious, is at its pleasantest when it caricatures a broadcast or pictures heaven as a stately bureaucracy.” The New York Post was ambivalent as well: “It takes a bold group of people to rush in on the territory covered so beautifully in ‘Green Pastures.’ The wisdom of this is questionable from several points of view, but the failure is never due to lack of trying....There is violence and slapstick, there are the wiles of Reginald Gardner and the temptations of Dolores Moran, and there are wild teeterings at the top of tall buildings. But somehow the comic fantasy doesn't come off as planned. The big build-up remains an architectural and overworked effort.”

== Adaptation in other media ==
The script was re-worked into an episode of radio's Ford Theater, broadcast March 4, 1949. Jack Benny reprised his character of Athanael, with Claude Rains now playing the Chief. This time the story was told in a straightforward fashion, with Benny actually playing an angel sent to Earth to blow the horn, as opposed to the dream scenario of the film. The radio story focuses on Athaniel's moral dilemma about whether or not the people of Earth, just suffering World War II, deserved to be extinguished with the Earth or given another chance.

A live television adaptation of the radio script was presented as a segment of Omnibus on November 29, 1953, with Benny again playing Athaniel, and Dorothy Malone as Elizabeth. In 2013, this version was issued on an exclusive DVD available to those who purchased The Jack Benny Program: The Lost Episodes from distributor Shout Factory's website.

The 1945 movie itself was released on DVD by Warner Archives in November 2013.

== Legacy ==
In a 1957 episode of his TV show, Jack's Life Story, Benny drives to 20th Century Fox to discuss a movie based on his life. At the studio lot, he casually asks the parking attendant (played by Mel Blanc, a close friend of Benny's) if he saw the movie. Blanc replies, "I directed it!"

== See also ==
- List of American films of 1945
- List of films about angels
