= The Unfaithful (1947 film) =

1947 film noir directed by Vincent Sherman

- Theatrical release poster
- Directed by: Vincent Sherman
- Screenplay by: David Goodis; James Gunn
- Based on: The Letter; 1927 play by W. Somerset Maugham
- Produced by: Jerry Wald
- Starring: Ann Sheridan; Lew Ayres; Zachary Scott
- Cinematography: Ernest Haller
- Edited by: Alan Crosland Jr.
- Music by: Max Steiner
- Production company: Warner Bros. Pictures
- Distributed by: Warner Bros. Pictures
- Release dates: January 28, 1947 (New York City); July 1, 1947 (U.S.)
- Running time: 109 minutes
- Country: United States
- Language: English
- Budget: $1,822,000
- Box office: $2,250,000 (US rentals) or $2,972,000

The Unfaithful is a 1947 American murder mystery film directed by Vincent Sherman and starring Ann Sheridan, Lew Ayres and Zachary Scott. It was produced and distributed by Warner Bros. Pictures. Regarded by some as a film noir, the picture is based on the W. Somerset Maugham-penned 1927 play and William Wyler-directed 1940 film The Letter, which was reworked and turned into an original screenplay by writers David Goodis and James Gunn who shifted the setting from Malaya to the United States.

== Plot ==
Chris Hunter stabs a man in her home one night while her husband Bob is out of town. The dead man's name is Tanner and she claims not to know him and to have acted in self-defense.

Art shop owner, Martin Barrow, contacts Chris's lawyer and good friend Larry Hannaford. Barrow shows Hannaford a bust of Chris Hunter's head, signed by Tanner, and attempts blackmail. It turns out Tanner had been a sculptor, and it is now evident to Hannaford that Chris has lied about never knowing the man she killed.

After learning about the bust, Chris goes to Barrow to try to take possession of it. But, Barrow has taken the piece to Tanner's wife, who is now convinced Chris had an affair with her husband and wants Chris punished for murder. Barrow convinces her to create more anguish for Chris by relaying this information to Bob Hunter, thinking also that the wronged husband would pay to avoid scandal. When Bob learns about the affair and sees the bust, he confronts Chris at home. After she admits to having an affair with Tanner while Bob was away during the war, he demands a divorce.

Chris is charged with murder and tried. Hannaford persuades the jury that while Chris was indeed guilty of adultery, she truly did stab Tanner in self-defense. Hannaford then convinces Bob, who has softened a bit on the idea of divorce after a long talk with his cousin, Paula, and Chris to at least consider trying to save their marriage, rather than rushing into a divorce.

== Cast ==
- Ann Sheridan as Chris Hunter
- Lew Ayres as Larry Hannaford
- Zachary Scott as Bob Hunter
- Eve Arden as Paula
- Jerome Cowan as Prosecuting Attorney
- Steven Geray as Martin Barrow
- John Hoyt as Det. Lt. Reynolds
- Peggy Knudsen as Claire
- Marta Mitrovich as Mrs. Tanner
- Douglas Kennedy as Roger
- Claire Meade as Martha
- Frances Morris as Agnes
- Jane Harker as Joan
- Heinie Conklin as Streetcar Passenger (uncredited)
- Jack Mower as Morrie (uncredited)
- Leo White as Courtroom Spectator (uncredited)

== Reception ==
=== Box office ===
The film was highly successful at the box office. According to Warner Bros records, the film cost $1,822,000 to produce and earned $1,939,000 domestically and $1,033,000 in foreign markets, registering a profit of $1,150,000.

=== Critical response ===
Thomas Pryor of The New York Times gave the film a mixed review:

"The Warner Brothers have turned out a better than average murder mystery in The Unfaithful, but they have badly over-weighted with melodramatics the things they obviously wanted to say about a pressing social problem. The new picture at the Strand stabs and jabs like a hit-and-run prizefighter at the subject of hasty divorces and the dangerous consequences to society of this ill conceived cure all for marital difficulties, but it never gets across a telling dramatic punch. However, through some uncommonly persuasive acting and skillful direction the patently artificial plot stands up surprisingly well."

The film was shown on the Turner Classic Movies show 'Noir Alley' with Eddie Muller on November 19, 2022.
