= Critic's Choice (film) =

1963 film by Don Weis

- Directed by: Don Weis
- Screenplay by: Jack Sher
- Based on: Critic's Choice by Ira Levin
- Produced by: Frank P. Rosenberg
- Starring: Bob Hope; Lucille Ball; Rip Torn; Marilyn Maxwell
- Cinematography: Charles Lang
- Edited by: William H. Ziegler
- Music by: George Duning
- Distributed by: Warner Bros. Pictures
- Release date: April 13, 1963
- Running time: 100 minutes
- Country: United States
- Language: English
- Box office: $1,250,000 (US/ Canada)

Critic's Choice is a 1963 American comedy film directed by Don Weis. Based on the 1960 Broadway play of the same name by Ira Levin, the movie stars Bob Hope and Lucille Ball and includes Rip Torn, Marilyn Maxwell, Jim Backus, Marie Windsor and Jerome Cowan in the cast.

This is the last of four films that Hope and Ball made together.

== Plot ==
Parker Ballantine is a theatrical critic, busily praising or disparaging the shows of Broadway. His wife Angela is feeling useless and restless, so she writes a play about her mother and sisters.

Angela does not believe Parker should review her work, since he will look prejudiced if he does so favorably and it will hurt her feelings if he knocks it. Parker has read it and is not impressed. A major producer, however, decides to back it.

Handsome Dion Kapakos directs the play and tries to strike up a romantic interest in the playwright. Angela continues to resist, but she's getting more fed up with Parker's negativity by the hour.

Before the play's first out-of-town tryout in Boston, the conflicted Parker goes to see his ex-wife, Ivy, who wants to break up his marriage, and gets roaring drunk. He decides to go to the opening, where the audience is laughing uproariously. He creates a scene, more than once almost falling over the edge of the balcony. He writes a scathing review and returns to the apartment, sober, to find Angie preparing to leave him. He apologizes for disrespecting her before and says that if she writes another play he will help her, if asked. They reconcile, and in the morning Angie finds a charming review of the night's proceedings pinned to his pillow.

== Cast ==
- Bob Hope as Parker Ballantine
- Lucille Ball as Angela Ballantine
- Marilyn Maxwell as Ivy London
- Rip Torn as Dion Kapakos
- Jessie Royce Landis as Charlotte Orr aka Charlie
- John Dehner as S.P. Champlain
- Jim Backus as Dr. William Von Hagedorn
- Ricky Kelman as John Ballantine
- Dorothy Green as Mrs. Margaret Champlain
- Marie Windsor as Sally Orr
- Joseph Gallison as Philip 'Phil' Yardley (as Evan McCord)
- Joan Shawlee as Marge Orr
- Richard Deacon as Harvey Rittenhouse
- Jerome Cowan as Joe Rosenfield
- Donald Losby as Godfrey Von Hagedorn
- Soupy Sales as Boston Desk Clerk

== Critical reception ==
The New York Times wrote, "It is pleasing to look at in its expensive décor, color and scope, ably played by its experienced stars and ingratiating in its quieter insights into a sophisticated marital relationship. So long as it meanders modestly through some above-average repartee, it provides an agreeable way to pass an evening. Instead of leaving well enough alone, unfortunately, the director, Don Weis, has tried to upholster the shaky plot with slapstick and broad burlesque...Both stars, old hands at this sort of thing, go through their paces with benign good humor, but their subtler comic talents remain untapped. At this rate, the critics' popularity seems unlikely to improve."

== See also ==
- List of American films of 1963
