= Lightning Strikes Twice (1951 film) =

1951 film directed by King Vidor

- Theatrical release poster
- Directed by: King Vidor
- Screenplay by: Lenore J. Coffee
- Based on: A Man Without Friends; 1940 novel by Margaret Echard
- Produced by: Henry Blanke
- Starring: Richard Todd; Ruth Roman; Mercedes McCambridge
- Cinematography: Sidney Hickox
- Edited by: Thomas Reilly
- Music by: Max Steiner
- Color process: Black and white
- Production company: Warner Bros. Pictures
- Distributed by: Warner Bros. Pictures
- Release dates: March 1, 1951 (Los Angeles); April 12, 1951 (New York)
- Running time: 91 minutes
- Country: United States
- Language: English
- Budget: $1,108,000
- Box office: $1,144,000

Lightning Strikes Twice is a 1951 Warner Bros. crime melodrama film starring Ruth Roman and Richard Todd and directed by King Vidor.

== Plot ==
In the early 1950s, wealthy Texas rancher Richard Trevelyan sits on death row for murdering his wife, being counseled by a priest before his execution. He is granted a surprise reprieve granting him a new trial, which ends in a hung jury freeing him.

Actress Shelley Carnes, on her way to a Texas dude ranch, meets local ranchers J.D. and Myra Nolan, who lend her their car to save her having to rent one. Lost in a storm, she encounters Trevelyan by chance.

The dude ranch is closed when Shelley arrives, as the notice failed to reach her while working in a traveling show.

Liza McStringer, who operates the ranch with her unstable handicapped younger brother String, explains that she was the holdout juror who had allowed Trevelyan to be freed. As a result, she has been shunned by neighbors and friends.

Shelley bonds with String and is invited to stay. She learns that Loraine, the murder victim and wife of Trevelyan, was a wicked and promiscuous woman loathed by many. She claims that Loraine had an affair with J.D., Trevelyan's business partner while working as his secretary.

Shelley finds Trevelyan brooding on a cliffside. Each gives the other mixed signals.

Shelley spends a night with the Nolans and is introduced to Harvey Turner, a woman-chasing neighbor who immediately makes advances. He also speaks ill of Loraine, suggesting that he was lucky to have escaped her clutches. Harvey later abducts Shelley, bringing her to a mysterious rendezvous with Trevelyan, who is his best friend and had requested that she be brought to him. Trevelyan and Shelley cannot resist each other and hurriedly marry.

Liza appears, uninvited, at the wedding reception, and accuses Trevelyan of the murder. That night, Shelley's fears cause her to flee to the safety of the dude ranch, where Liza confesses in a murderous rage that it was she, jealous and wanting Trevelyan for herself, who had killed Loraine. She is stopped from strangling Shelley by Trevelyan and by Harvey's arrival.

Liza and String flee in their car. Pursued by police, Liza plunges the car over a cliff but lives long enough to confess to a priest that Trevelyan had been telling the truth all along about not knowing how his wife had died.

Tevelyan and Shelley drive away toward their honeymoon.

== Cast ==
- Ruth Roman as Shelley Carnes
- Richard Todd as Richard Trevelyan
- Mercedes McCambridge as Liza McStringer
- Zachary Scott as Harvey Turner
- Frank Conroy as J. D. Nolan
- Kathryn Givney as Myra Nolan
- Rhys Williams as Father Paul
- Darryl Hickman as String
- Nacho Galindo as Pedro

== Production ==
Warner Bros. Pictures purchased the film rights to Margaret Echard's novel A Man Without Friends in November 1945 and Robert Hutton was rumored as the male lead. In December 1948, Henry Blanke was announced as the film's producer. Lenore Coffee was assigned to write the script in 1949 but rewrote it in 1950 in order to fit Richard Todd after he was cast as the male lead. Virginia Mayo had been cast in the role of Liza but was transferred to Captain Horatio Hornblower before production began and was replaced by Mercedes McCambridge. Loretta Young and Joan Fontaine had been considered for roles in the film. Ruth Roman was cast in the female lead role in January 1950.

The music score repeatedly echoes a passage from La valse by Maurice Ravel.

Richard Todd claimed that he had sung in the film but was "so awful" that the scene was cut from the final print.

== Reception ==
In a contemporary review for The New York Times, critic A. H. Weiler wrote: "The Brothers Warner apparently have not come up with the perfect romantic melodrama in 'Lightning Strikes Twice.' But ... they can be grateful for a professional cast, who work in some striking desert locales to provide a fair share of suspense and characterization. However, Director King Vidor, who is dealing with such fulminous elements as suspicion, crime and punishment, has not taken advantage of these potentially dramatic attributes. And, as a result, this story of a man harried by a murder he did not commit, is more often indirect and conversational than might be expected. ... 'Lightning Strikes Twice,' In short, is not explosive fare, but it does crackle on occasion."

Critic John L. Scott of the Los Angeles Times called the film "a suspense drama with conversation—much conversation" and wrote: "Warners have assembled a top-drawer cast to play out the drama, which resolves too many times into a 'conversation piece.' Sparks fly here and there but not often enough to make the plot, concocted by Lenore Coffee from a novel by Margaret Echard, catch fire. ... 'Lightning Strikes Twice' is a well-made picture that could have benefited with more action and less talk."

The film earned $1,144,000 ($785,000 domestically and $359,000 internationally), slightly more than its budget of $1,108,000, according to Warner Bros. records.

== Legacy ==
In February 2020, the film was shown at the 70th Berlin International Film Festival as part of a retrospective dedicated to King Vidor's career.
