= Whiplash (1948 film) =

1948 film by Lewis Seiler

- Theatrical release poster
- Directed by: Lewis Seiler (as Lew Seiler)
- Screenplay by: Harriet Frank Jr. Maurice Geraghty; Adaptation: Gordon Kahn
- Story by: Kenneth Earl
- Produced by: William Jacobs
- Starring: Dane Clark; Alexis Smith; Zachary Scott; Eve Arden
- Cinematography: Peverell Marley
- Edited by: Frank Magee
- Music by: William Lava; Franz Waxman
- Distributed by: Warner Bros. Pictures
- Release date: December 24, 1948 (United States)
- Running time: 91 minutes
- Country: United States
- Language: English

Whiplash is a 1948 American film noir directed by Lewis Seiler (credited as Lew Seiler). It was written by Harriet Frank Jr. and Maurice Geraghty and adapted by Gordon Kahn, from a story by Kenneth Earl. The film stars Dane Clark, Alexis Smith, Zachary Scott and Eve Arden.

== Plot ==
The film opens with a middle-weight bout in Madison Square Garden (1925) in New York City where Mike Angelo battles a seemingly superior opponent. He's going down for the count when he's saved by the bell. Cut to Mike Gordon, a happy-go-lucky painter in California, upset that cafe owner Sam has let customer Laurie Rogers buy a painting hanging on the wall. Mike is unsatisfied with his work and confronts Laurie to get it back. She convinces him it's good if not perfect, so Mike invites her to dinner.

After a romantic dinner and swim in the ocean, they've got a date for breakfast. When a shady character enters Sam's cafe, Laurie abruptly leaves town. At her hotel, Mike sees the painting wrapped and addressed to Dr. Vincent, New York City. Sam gives Mike money to go to New York.

Later, in his Greenwich Village artist's studio, Mike's neighbor Christine invites Mike out to the Pelican Club, a pricey night spot. Although Christine's plan to get him a portrait commission backfires, Laurie appears in a spotlight to sing. Mike goes to her dressingroom, where hoodlums attack him. He knocks one guy out, but gets hit over the head by a goon named Costello. He's carried unconscious to the boss's office.

Club owner Rex Durant, a crippled ex-boxer, is impressed that Mike just knocked out a middle-weight contender. Durant offers to make a champion of him. The only hitch: Laurie is actually Mrs. Durant. Mike resents Laurie's having lied to him. Next day at the gym, Mike is examined by Dr. Vincent, who's got the painting hanging in his office. He's Laurie's brother.

Mike trains to be a prizefighter to get Laurie out of his system, becoming enmeshed in Durant's sadistic schemes. Dr. Vincent reveals that when he failed to fix Durant's legs after a car accident, Durant preyed on his guilt and manipulated Laurie into staying married. Dr. Vincent decides to kill Durant to liberate Laurie, but Mike thwarts him, confronting Durant himself. Costello gives Mike a concussion. A fight now would be suicide, but Durant promises Mike if he wins the big bout, Laurie will be free. Durant wants him dead because he knows Laurie loves Mike.

The extended flashback ends with Mike woozy and taking a beating at Madison Square Garden. He nonetheless triumphs in the ring before being sent to the hospital. Dr. Vincent goes after Durant and is shot by Costello but manages to shoot Durant, whose wheelchair careens out of Madison Square Garden into an oncoming taxi.

Cut to Mike painting on the beach in California. Enter Sam to announce Laurie's arrival. They kiss on the cliff.

== Cast ==
- Dane Clark as Michael Gordon
- Alexis Smith as Laurie Durant
- Zachary Scott as Rex Durant
- Eve Arden as Chris Sherwood
- Jeffrey Lynn as Dr. Arnold Vincent
- S. Z. Sakall as Sam
- Alan Hale as Terrance O'Leary
- Douglas Kennedy as Costello
- Ransom M. Sherman as Tex Sanders
- Freddie Steele as Duke Carney
- Robert Lowell as Trask
- Don McGuire as Markus

== Reception ==
The New York Times film critic, Thomas M. Pryor, gave the film a negative review. He wrote, "Good sense and dramatic construction went by the wayside in the filming of Whiplash and what is left on the screen is a pointless exposition of brutality, nicely demonstrated, however, by Mr. Clark and Zachary Scott, with Miss Smith providing suitable decoration. If it's plain, old fashioned mayhem that you desire, Whiplash most likely will be to your liking. Otherwise proceed with caution."

Variety called the movie "a major disappointment" financially.

== See also ==
- List of boxing films
