= Montana (1950 film) =

1950 film by Ray Enright

- 1950 theatrical poster
- Directed by: Ray Enright; Raoul Walsh (uncredited)
- Written by: James R. Webb; Borden Chase; Charles O'Neal
- Based on: story by Ernest Haycox
- Produced by: William Jacobs
- Starring: Errol Flynn; Alexis Smith
- Cinematography: Karl Freund
- Edited by: Frederick Richards
- Music by: David Buttolph
- Color process: Technicolor
- Production company: Warner Bros. Pictures
- Distributed by: Warner Bros. Pictures
- Release dates: January 20, 1950 (Los Angeles); February 3, 1950 (New York)
- Running time: 76 minutes
- Country: United States
- Language: English
- Budget: $1,589,000
- Box office: $3,647,000

Montana is a 1950 American Western film directed by Ray Enright and starring Errol Flynn. It was only the second time that Flynn had played an Australian on screen, the first being Desperate Journey (1942).

The film was Flynn's fourth and final pairing with frequent costar Alexis Smith.

== Plot ==
A narrator tells of the great wars that raged in Montana territory over the grazing of cattle versus that of sheep. Men on both sides of the battle died, but eventually it was the sheep herders who were driven away. Morgan Lane, an Australian sheepman, rides to Montana territory in 1871. He and his men come see a sign declaring that any sheep herders crossing the line into the area will be shot on sight, as the surrounding plains are strictly for cattle grazing. The men establish camp for the night just before the border. During the night, their young unarmed Mexican watchman is shot dead by a local gang of cattle raisers.

The following morning, after Morgan and his men have buried the body, traveling peddler Papa Schultz appears. Morgan and Papa Shultz ride into town so that Morgan can learn who the local ruffians are. In town, he poses as a peddler and discovers that the gang in the saloon. Suspicious of the newcomer, Slim Reeves challenges him to a pistol duel. Slim attempts to cheat by drawing before the count of three but Morgan proves his skills by shooting the gun out of his hand. Morgan discovers that there are three chief landowners in the area. The main two are Maria Singleton and her fiancé Rod Ackroyd, who are vehemently opposed to sheep herders in their area. The third is a man named Forsythe.

Morgan rides to the Singleton ranch with a guitar as a present for Maria and they have a sing-along together. Rod is suspicious of Morgan and is in a foul mood after being thrown from a wild stallion earlier in the afternoon. Maria invites Morgan to join them for dinner and Morgan reveals that he wishes to purchase some of their land. They believe that he wants it for cattle grazing, and Rod makes a bet with him for the land: if Morgan can stay on the wild horse for exactly one minute, he can have the land. Rod's right-hand man Slim cuts the stirrup so that Morgan falls from the horse a few seconds before the minute mark. Maria, feeling sorry for Morgan, offers to rent him a piece of her land that would have belonged to her deceased brother. The following day, she discovers that Morgan is a sheep herder and is livid at his betrayal.

During the night, Morgan gathers the minority cattlemen in the area and enlists the help of the banker and Forsythe to fight another war with the cattle owners. Forsythe invites everyone to his home for a party and announces their intentions to fight. Maria confronts Morgan about his deceit and he tears the lease and gives it back to her. She shares a kiss with him but then discovers that he intends to wage war against her and her friends, and she becomes angry and leaves the party. Slim shoots and kills Forsythe, which invokes a fight between Morgan and Slim during which Slim fires his own gun and unintentionally kills himself.

Morgan, his men and the minority cattle owners are joined by the sheriff as they plan to take the sheep across the territory. The sheriff warns them that Rod and his men have organized a cattle stampede to trample the men and their sheep. Morgan and his men block the stampede, and in the battle both the sheriff and Rod are killed. Morgan and his men intend to move the sheep through the territory by walking them through the main street of the town.

One of the men rides back to the Singleton ranch and informs Maria of Rod's death and Morgan's plans, claiming there is no one to stop him now. Maria takes a gun and rides into town, where she stands in the middle of the main street and waits for Morgan. Morgan walks toward her but she threatens to shoot him. He continues bringing the sheep along and she shoots him in the shoulder and he collapses on the ground. Seeing what she has done, she drops the gun and runs to Morgan, helping him and proving her affection. They bicker over how stubborn the other is and then share a kiss.

== Cast ==
- Errol Flynn as Morgan Lane
- Alexis Smith as Maria Singleton
- S.Z. Sakall as Papa Schultz
- Douglas Kennedy as Rod
- Ian MacDonald as Reeves
- Lester Matthews as Forsythe
- Lane Chandler as Sheriff Jake Overby
- James Brown as Tex Coyne (uncredited)
- Art Gilmore as Narrator (uncredited)

== Production ==
In June 1940, producer William Jacobs assigned Thames Williamson to work on the script and Errol Flynn was listed as a possible star. However, Flynn disliked making Westerns. In 1949 he told Hedda Hopper:

Acting for me is sheer fun. There's only one thing I really don't want to do any more and that's Westerns. I guess I've trod every back trail and canyon pass in the entire west. I've never literally had to read the line, 'they went that a-way pard', but there is one cliche I've said so many times it comes back to me in all my nightmares. Every time there's a gap in the story, every time the writers don't know what to do next, they have me pull up ahead of my gang, assume a decidedly grim look, and say 'All right men, you know what to do now.' The fact is I've made so many of these things, scripts seem so much the same, that what it adds up to in my mind is that the studio says, 'Here's a horse. Get on.'

In December 1947 it was announced that Ronald Reagan would play the lead in Montana, with the script based on a novel by Ernest Haycox. By January 1948 the film became officially part of Warner Bros.' schedule for that year. The following month, the studio announced that the film would produced with a budget of $2 million.

In July 1948, Warner Bros. ordered Flynn to return from his home in Jamaica and take the role under his contract. Later that month, Ray Enright was assigned to direct as his first film under a long-term contract with Warner Bros. In August, Alexis Smith and S. Z. Sakall were announced as costars.

Filming began in August 1948 with an incomplete script. James R. Webb and Charles G Booth were credited as working from a story by Ernest Haycox. Flynn missed some days of filming because of illness.

== Reception ==
In a contemporary review for The New York Times, critic Bosley Crowther wrote: "Let's not dwell too long on the details. They're as plain as the nose on your face. Mr. Flynn can out-shoot, out-ride and out-punch any single cow-poke around the place. He can also make music with a gee-tar and sing cozy duets with Miss Smith, all of which have a powerful influence in changing her opinions with respect to sheep. But we're bound to profess that said details are awfully obvious, conventional and dull. Here's a picture about which the Warners and Mr. Flynn should feel sheepish, we're afraid."

Critic John L. Scott of the Los Angeles Times wrote: "Color adds to the scenic values of 'Montana,' and the action is fast-paced enough for western film devotees. Miss Smith, who plays with more fire than usual, and Flynn seem to be excellently matched as the battling romantics. ... 'Montana' won't set the cinema world on fire but it's solid western entertainment."

According to Variety, the film earned $2.1 million domestically in 1950. The film earned £131,969 in the UK and had admissions of 1,899,891 in France. According to Warner Bros records, the film earned $2,203,000 domestically and $1,444,000 overseas, a total of $3,647,000 overall. As its cost was $1,589,000, it is likely that the film returned a profit.

== Comic-book adaptation ==
The film was released as a Fawcett Movie Comic #2.
