= South of St. Louis =

1949 film by Ray Enright

- Directed by: Ray Enright
- Written by: Zachary Gold; James R. Webb
- Produced by: Milton Sperling
- Starring: Joel McCrea; Alexis Smith; Zachary Scott; Dorothy Malone
- Cinematography: Karl Freund
- Edited by: Clarence Kolster
- Music by: Max Steiner
- Production company: United States Pictures
- Distributed by: Warner Bros. Pictures
- Release date: March 6, 1949
- Running time: 88 minutes
- Country: United States
- Language: English
- Budget: $1,601,000
- Box office: $1.6 million or $3,382,000

South of St Louis is a 1949 American Technicolor Western film directed by Ray Enright and starring Joel McCrea, Alexis Smith, Zachary Scott and Dorothy Malone. It chronicles the friendship between three ranchers after their ranch is destroyed by raiders led by the infamous Luke Cottrell. The film was originally titled Distant Drums, but was later changed to its current title, which refers to Civil War army deserters.

== Plot ==
During the Civil War, Kip Davis (Joel McCrea), Charlie Burns (Zachary Scott), and Lee Price (Douglas Kennedy), are run out of town by the guerilla raider and Union Army leader Luke Cottrell, who burns down their ranch. Though Kip's fiancée, Deb (Dorothy Malone) begs them to stay in the small Texas town of Edenton, the three ranch owners vow vengeance on the Cottrell and decide to head south to find him. When they get to Brownsville, Texas, Lee decides to join the Confederate Army, while Kip and Charlie attempt to rebuild Three Bell ranch. Before they do, however, they accept an offer from an attractive local lounge singer, Rouge de Lisle (Alexis Smith), to transport a box of furniture for fifty dollars. It turns out, however, that the box is instead filled with an illegal shipment of firearms and Kip is subsequently arrested. Before he is punished, however, he is freed and is picked up by Rouge, who offers him a job gun-running for the Confederacy. He accepts the offer, hoping to get enough money smuggling to rebuild the ranch. The trio then hires a group of gunmen, one of which is Slim Hansen, who used to work for Cottrell, and heads to Matamoros, Mexico to pick up a shipment of guns for the Confederacy.

As they attempt to cross the border, they run into Cottrell and his gang. In the ensuing gunfight, Kip and Charlie are saved by a company of Confederate soldiers, one of which is Lee. The three return to Edenton, where Kip's fiancée again attempts to convince him to stay. Kip is determined, however, to get enough money to restart his farm and instead continues to smuggle guns. When Brownsville is finally captured by rebel soldiers, the three must decide what the next course of action is. Lee continues to fight with the Confederate army, Kip wants to restore Three Bell ranch, and Charlie, more interested in the money, opts to continue smuggling guns. When Deborah refuses to leave her duties as a nurse to join him at the ranch, Kip decides to go with Charlie and return to smuggling. This pleases Rouge, who has fallen in love with Kip.

As they near the border, they get word that Cottrell has threatened to kill Charlie and Kip if they return to Matamoros. At Slim's suggestion, they decide to steal the shipment of guns. The men dress up as Union soldiers in order to steal the guns, but then run into Confederate soldiers who confuse them for the enemy and open fire. Lee, who suspects that Kip and Charlie are behind the attack, breaks off all connections with his two former friends.

When Cottrell kills one of Kip's men, Kip resolves that he must kill him. Before he can, however, Slim warns Cottrell, who ambushes Kip. Kip avoids the ambush, but Cottrell is killed by Slim. When Kip returns to Edenton, he finds out that his fiancée has fallen for Lee. Realizing that he has lost both of his closest friends and his fiancée, he leaves with Rouge to Matamoros.

After the war is over, Lee joins the Texas Rangers. While serving in Brownsville, he is threatened by his former friend, Charlie. Hoping to resolve the situation, Deb goes to Matamoros to ask Kip for help. With the help of Rouge, Deb convinces Kip to go to Brownsville. Kip gets there just in time to stop the fight, but Charlie is shot by the treacherous Slim. With Charlie dying in his arms, Kip promises Charlie that he will rebuild the Three Bell ranch.

== Cast ==
- Joel McCrea as Kip Davis
- Alexis Smith as Rouge de Lisle
- Zachary Scott as Charlie Burns
- Dorothy Malone as Deborah Miller
- Douglas Kennedy as Lee Price
- Alan Hale as Jake Everts
- Victor Jory as Luke Cottrell
- Bob Steele as Slim Hansen
- Art Smith as Bronco
- Russell Hicks as Col. Kirby (uncredited)
- Jack Mower as Marshal Billings (uncredited)
- Forrest Taylor as Jason (uncredited)

== Box office ==
According to Warner Bros records the film earned $2,236,000 domestic and $1,146,000 foreign.

== See also ==
- List of films and television shows about the American Civil War
