= Her Kind of Man =

1946 film by Frederick de Cordova

- Theatrical release poster
- Directed by: Frederick De Cordova
- Screenplay by: Leopold Atlas; Gordon Kahn
- Story by: Charles Hoffman; James V. Kern
- Produced by: Alex Gottlieb
- Starring: Dane Clark; Janis Paige; Zachary Scott
- Cinematography: Carl E. Guthrie
- Edited by: Dick Richards
- Music by: Franz Waxman
- Production company: Warner Bros. Pictures
- Distributed by: Warner Bros. Pictures
- Release date: May 3, 1946 (New York)
- Running time: 80 minutes
- Country: United States
- Language: English

Her Kind of Man is a 1946 American crime film noir directed by Frederick De Cordova, and starring Dane Clark, Janis Paige and Zachary Scott. The film bears no relation to His Kind of Woman (1951) starring Robert Mitchum and Jane Russell.

== Plot ==
A nightclub singer, Georgia King, has been seeing Steve Maddux, a gambler. After another gambler, Felix Bender, ends up dead after a dispute between them, Steve goes to Miami, where club owner Joe Marino and wife Ruby welcome him. Steve agrees to work for Joe after losing $50,000 in a crooked card game.

Newspaper columnist Don Corwin and a cop, Bill Fellows, begin looking into Bender's death. Don falls for Georgia, even though Fellows warns him that she's been keeping company with a criminal. After an encounter between Don and Steve, a thug named Candy takes it upon himself to beat up Don, putting him in the hospital.

After causing Ruby to be killed by mistake, Steve makes an enemy of Joe, and they end up shooting one another. Steve dies in Georgia's arms.

== Cast ==
- Dane Clark as Don Corwin
- Janis Paige as Georgia King
- Zachary Scott as Steve Maddux
- Faye Emerson as Ruby Marino
- George Tobias as Joe Marino
- Howard Smith as Bill Fellows
- Harry Lewis as Candy
- Sheldon Leonard as Felix Bender

== Reception ==
=== Critical response ===
Film critic Bosley Crowther gave the film a lukewarm review, "There are gun fights, slugging matches and gambling sessions of the usual hard-boiled sort—and, except for a certain flair in dialogue, it is just another one of those things."
