= Colt .45 (1950 film) =

1950 film by Edwin L. Marin

- Theatrical release poster
- Directed by: Edwin L. Marin
- Written by: Thomas W. Blackburn
- Produced by: Saul Elkins
- Starring: Randolph Scott; Ruth Roman; Zachary Scott; Lloyd Bridges; Alan Hale, Sr.; Chief Thundercloud
- Cinematography: Wilfred M. Cline
- Edited by: Frank Magee
- Music by: William Lava
- Production company: Warner Bros. Pictures
- Distributed by: Warner Bros. Pictures
- Release date: May 5, 1950 (New York)
- Running time: 74 minutes
- Country: United States
- Language: English
- Budget: $636,000
- Box office: $3,121,000 $1.8 million (UD)

Colt .45 is a 1950 American Western film directed by Edwin L. Marin and starring Randolph Scott, Ruth Roman and Zachary Scott. Reissued under the title Thundercloud, the film served as the loose basis for the television series Colt .45 starring Wayde Preston, which premiered seven years later. Written by Thomas W. Blackburn, author of the lyrics to The Ballad of Davy Crockett, the film is about a gun salesman and gunfighter who hunts a killer who stole two new Colt .45 repeating pistols, leaving a trail of dead bodies behind him. The revolvers used in the film were actually first-model .44-caliber Colt revolving belt pistols made in 1849 and reaching final form by 1850.

== Plot ==
In the town of Red Rock, gun salesman Steve Farrell demonstrates the new Colt .45 repeating pistols to the sheriff. The demonstration is interrupted when men arrive to transfer one of the prisoners to another jail. As he is being led away, prisoner Jason Brett grabs the pistols, shoots the sheriff and escapes. Convinced that Farrell was involved in the escape, the townspeople arrest the gun salesman. Brett initiates a campaign of robberies and cold-blooded murder, with regular guns being no match for his Colt .45 pistols.

Farrell is released from jail, tracks Brett into Texas and encounters a band of dead Indians whom Brett has killed to provide cover for a stagecoach robbery. The only survivor of the attack, Chief Walking Bear, tells Farrell about Brett and his gang's plan. Farrell jumps onto the stage to fight Brett's gang with his own set of Colt .45s. The only passenger on the stage, Beth Donovan, tries to prevent him from fighting the robbers.

After Brett's gang retreats, Farrell stops the stage and notices a white scarf hanging outside the stagecoach window. Believing it to be a signal to the robbers, Farrell suspects that Beth is part of the gang. She escapes on a horse while Farrell is helping the wounded stagecoach driver. Farrell does not know that Beth is the wife of Paul Donovan, one of Brett's group of henchmen known as the Colt .45 Gang. Beth returns to her cabin home, which is being used by Brett and his gang as a hideout. Although she believes that her husband has been forced to work with the outlaws, she soon learns that he is actually plotting crimes with Brett.

Unknown to the citizens of Bonanza Creek, Sheriff Harris is working with Brett and his gang. When Farrell arrives in town Harris appoints him as a deputy. Harris rides to Brett's hideout and warns him that Farrell is in town. Farrell learns Beth's identity and Harris encourages him to ride to her house to confront her, knowing that Brett and his gang will be lying in wait to murder Farrell, but Farrell evades the ambush with the help of Walking Bear and his tribe.

Back at the hideout, Beth overhears her husband Paul plotting with gang leader Brett and realizes that he is working with the gang. After she denounces him, Paul locks her in a shed. She escapes and hurries into town to reveal what she knows, but Paul shoots and wounds her. Farrell pulls Beth onto his horse and takes her to Walking Bear's camp. Beth regains consciousness and warns Farrell about Brett's plan to take control of Bonanza Creek.

The Indians discover Paul dead, sitting on a horse and tied to the saddle, shot many times in the back by a Colt .45. Along the trail, Harris and the gang set a trap and capture Farrell, but the Indians come to his rescue and kill one of his captors. After Farrell and the Indians leave, though mortally wounded, Harris manages to mount a horse. Farrell and the Indians ride to Bonanza Creek and the tribesmen kill Brett's men. Harris arrives in town and warns Brett, and then he dies just inside the door of the sheriff's office, where Brett has camped with Beth, who becomes his hostage. When Farrell and the Indians arrive at the jail, Brett uses Beth as a shield, but Beth escapes. Farrell enters the jail and sees that Brett is out of ammunition, and the men fight. The men grab guns and a shot is fired. Brett steps out of the office, takes a few steps and falls dead in the street. Farrell then walks out of the office and is embraced by Beth.

== Cast ==
- Randolph Scott as Steve Farrell
- Ruth Roman as Beth Donovan
- Zachary Scott as Jason Brett
- Lloyd Bridges as Paul Donovan
- Alan Hale, Sr. as Sheriff Harris of Bonanza Creek
- Ian MacDonald as Miller. In 1952 his character role was again named Miller in High Noon
- Chief Thundercloud as Walking Bear
- Luther Crockett as Judge Tucker
- Walter Coy as Carl
- Charles Evans as Redrock Sheriff
- Carl Andre as Indian
- Clyde Hudkins, Jr. as Indian
- Leroy Johnson as Indian
- Stanley Andrews as Sheriff (uncredited)

This is the final film in which Hale acted, although the previously filmed Rogues of Sherwood Forest was released after Colt .45.

== Reception ==
In a contemporary review for The New York Times, critic Bosley Crowther wrote:

One thing is fairly obvious: the Warners weren't in a high-brow mood when they rounded up all the fellows and banged out "Colt .45." This Technicolored Western ... is as intellectually simple as one and one are two. And although it is solemnly intended as a tribute to that great six-shooting gun, it is really a monumental sanction of the Western formula. That is no easy achievement. Plenty of Westerns have been made that were just like plenty of others, yet they haven't occasioned the remark. But here is a whoop-de-do horse opera which is so utterly cut to form, in which the good-man and bad-man encounters occur so patly when you most expect them to, and in which the cowboy acting is so obviously full of clichés that the whole thing shrieks loudly—almost boastfully—of its absolute conformance to rules. In fact, it is such a hackneyed picture that it is actually a lot of fun.

According to Warner Bros. records, the film earned $2,003,000 domestically and $1,118,000 foreign.

== Adaptation ==
Warner Bros. loosely based a television series of the same name upon the film in 1957, with Wayde Preston starring as a gun salesman named Christopher Colt. When Preston left the series, he was replaced by Donald May as Sam Colt, Jr., who also sold the family's pistols across the West and became involved in gunfights. The series was eventually marketed in the United Kingdom as The Colt Cousins and ran for three seasons.
