= One Last Fling =

1949 film by Peter Godfrey

- Theatrical release poster
- Directed by: Peter Godfrey
- Screenplay by: Richard Flournoy; William Sackheim
- Story by: Herbert Clyde Lewis
- Produced by: Saul Elkins
- Starring: Alexis Smith; Zachary Scott; Douglas Kennedy; Ann Doran; Ransom M. Sherman; Veda Ann Borg
- Cinematography: Carl E. Guthrie
- Edited by: Frederick Richards
- Music by: David Buttolph
- Production company: Warner Bros. Pictures
- Distributed by: Warner Bros. Pictures
- Release date: June 30, 1949
- Running time: 65 minutes
- Country: United States
- Language: English
- Budget: $252,000
- Box office: $412,000

One Last Fling is a 1949 American comedy film directed by Peter Godfrey and written by Richard Flournoy and William Sackheim. The film stars Alexis Smith, Zachary Scott, Douglas Kennedy, Ann Doran, Ransom M. Sherman and Veda Ann Borg. The film was released by Warner Bros. Pictures on June 30, 1949.

== Plot ==
Olivia Pearce ran her husband Larry's music store in New York while he was off to war. Now he's home and needs someone to head his sales department, but decides to hire his uncle's secretary, Gaye Winston, instead of his wife.

A misunderstanding occurs wherein Olivia believes the job is hers. Larry, painted in a corner, gives it to her. He goes to lunch with Gaye to explain. Olivia, at another table in the restaurant, spots her husband with a woman. She claims not to be jealous, telling her lunch companion Vera that the only woman Larry ever sounded interested in was one he knew a long time ago, a Gaye Winston.

Vic Lardner bursts into the restaurant, accusing Larry of stealing his wife. It turns out Gaye and Vic are married. Olivia, seeing this scene from across the room, packs Larry's bags at home and demands a divorce. When he explains about wanting Gaye to have the job, Olivia is even more offended. Out he goes.

Some time later, Larry and Vic bump into each other in a bar. They settle their differences after Vic says he and Gaye have reconciled. Larry decides to do likewise with Olivia, but months go by as they keep missing each other. It still all turns out happily in the end.

== Cast ==
- Alexis Smith as Olivia Pearce
- Zachary Scott as Larry Pearce
- Douglas Kennedy as Vic Lardner
- Ann Doran as Vera Thompson
- Ransom M. Sherman as Judge Fred Bolton
- Veda Ann Borg as Gaye Winston Lardner
- Jim Backus as Howard Pritchard
- Helen Westcott as Annie Mae Hunter
- Barbara Bates as June Payton
- Jody Gilbert as Amy Dearing

== Reception ==
According to Warner Bros the film earned $362,000 domestically and $50,000 foreign.
