= The Smiling Ghost =

1941 film by Lewis Seiler

- Theatrical release poster
- Directed by: Lewis Seiler
- Written by: Screenplay: Kenneth Gamet; Story: Stuart Palmer
- Produced by: Kenneth Gamet
- Starring: Wayne Morris; Alexis Smith; Alan Hale
- Cinematography: Arthur L. Todd
- Edited by: Jack Killifer
- Music by: Bernhard Kaun
- Production company: Warner Bros. Pictures
- Distributed by: Warner Bros. Pictures
- Release date: September 6, 1941
- Running time: 71 minutes
- Country: United States
- Language: English

The Smiling Ghost is a 1941 American horror comedy film directed by Lewis Seiler and starring Wayne Morris, Alexis Smith, and Alan Hale. It was produced and distributed by Warner Bros. Pictures. In the film, a woman has lost three fiancés to mysterious accidents. The press has circulated rumors that she is haunted by the so-called “Smiling Ghost”. Her grandmother decides to hire an unemployed engineer to pose as the woman's fourth fiancé. The man is soon targeted by the supposed ghost, but suspects that a vengeful former fiancé is behind the attacks.

== Plot ==
The elderly Mrs. Bentley (Helen Westley) and her lawyer see a newspaper ad from an unemployed and unmarried engineer seeking work doing “anything legal.” The lawyer calls the engineer, Alexander “Lucky” Downing (Wayne Morris), and sets up a meeting, during which Lucky is offered $1000 to feign an engagement to Mrs. Bentley's granddaughter Elinor Bentley Fairchild (Alexis Smith) for one month. Lucky considers it a strange offer, but he needs the money so he takes the job.

What Downing doesn't know is that Elinor's three former fiancés have met horrible fates. The first, Johnny Eggleston, mysteriously drowned. The second, Paul Myron (David Bruce), was paralyzed when his car rolled over and has been confined to an iron lung ever since. The third, Alan Winters, died by snakebite while on the 18th floor of a Boston hotel.

Given the fate of her former beaus, there are those who believe Elinor is the victim of the “Smiling Ghost,” and she has been dubbed the “Kiss of Death Girl” by the local newspapers. Lil Barstow (Brenda Marshall), a reporter who has followed the case closely, has been in touch with Myron, who persuades her to talk Downing out of the engagement before he too becomes a victim of the ghost.

Lil attempts to intercept Lucky at the train station where he and his nervous valet, Clarence (Willie Best), are to meet Elinor. Before Lil can warn Downing, however, Elinor smashes her camera and hustles Lucky and Clarence off to Bentley mansion. Downing is delighted to find Elinor so attractive and affectionate but has no idea what awaits him at the mansion. There he meets his prospective in-laws: a diabolical great-uncle Ames Bentley (Charles Halton), who shows Lucky his collection of shrunken heads and mentions that he is only missing a good "Negroid" specimen; cousin Tennant Bentley (Richard Ainley), who has a drinking problem; and Uncle Hilton Fairchild (Roland Drew) and his wife Rose (Lee Patrick), who will lose part of their fortune should Elinor marry.

That evening Tennant drunkenly objects to Lucky sleeping in what had been his room, so Lucky agrees to switch rooms with him. Later that night, a man who is presumably the Smiling Ghost emerges through a secret wall panel and attacks Tennant, no doubt believing him to be Downing. In the ensuing confusion, Downing encounters the reporter Lil Barstow outside, who tells him about the fate of the former fiancés and persuades him to leave. Lucky asks her, "Couldn't all these have all been accidents?" To which Lil replies, "Listen, it's more than an accident when a cobra strikes a man on the 18th floor of a Boston hotel." Convinced that the situation is perilous, Downing plans to sneak away with Clarence, who had found the semiconscious Tennant in a trunk in the cellar and is eager to depart; however, after Elinor confesses that she has fallen in love with him, he decides to stay and catch the "ghost" for her.

To find the ghost or whoever it is, Downing turns to Lil for help. She takes him to visit the crippled Paul Myron. Paul relates his ghost story, saying that the ghost appeared when he was pinned under his wrecked car and adding that the ghost resembled John Eggleston, Elinor's first fiancé. Paul says he believes Eggleston drowned himself after Elinor broke off their engagement and is now intent on making sure she never marries. Downing rejects the idea that Eggleston is a ghost but finds it plausible that he faked his death and is bent on revenge. Lil and Lucky then pay a visit to Eggleston's crypt in the cemetery and discover it empty. While there, Downing is attacked by the “ghost” and entombed. After he is rescued by Lil, he is even more determined to resolve the mystery. And to that end, he suggests to Elinor that they pretend to marry to lure the killer out of hiding. In the ensuing denouement, the Smiling Ghost is unmasked as Paul Myron and an unexpected espousal is thrown in for good measure.

== Cast ==
- Wayne Morris as Alexander "Lucky" Downing
- Alexis Smith as Elinor Bentley
- Alan Hale as Norton
- Brenda Marshall as Lil Barstow
- Lee Patrick as Rose Fairchild
- David Bruce as Paul Myron
- Helen Westley as Grandmother Bentley
- Willie Best as Clarence
- Charles Halton as Great-Uncle Ames Bentley
- Richard Ainley as Cousin Tennant Bentley
- Roland Drew as Uncle Hilton Fairchild
- George Meader as Mr. Dinwiddie
- Clem Bevans as Sexton

== Reception ==
The New York Times review of the film dated September 26, 1941 by Bosley Crowther is generally unfavorable, noting that the story is predictable and inane. Mr. Crowther's comments, "Much of it seems like the nonsense at a party or Halloween." He is also critical of most of the acting, although he does praise the performances of Willie Best and Alexis Smith.

Another reviewer comments, "There are some definite plot holes here, but the generally high level of acting keeps things from being too ridiculous."

More recently, Leonard Maltin in his "Classic Movie Guide" reviewed it warmly, noting the "genial cast keeps the laughs and chills bubbling along."

== Home video ==
In 2010, the film was released by Warner Archive as part of the six-film DVD-R collection Warner Bros. Horror/Mystery Double Features.
