= Steel Against the Sky =

1941 film by A. Edward Sutherland

- Theatrical release poster
- Directed by: A. Edward Sutherland
- Screenplay by: Paul Gerard Smith
- Story by: Maurice Hanline; Jesse L. Lasky, Jr.
- Produced by: Bryan Foy
- Starring: Lloyd Nolan; Alexis Smith; Craig Stevens; Gene Lockhart; Edward Ellis; Walter Catlett
- Cinematography: James Van Trees
- Edited by: Doug Gould
- Music by: William Lava
- Production company: Warner Bros. Pictures
- Distributed by: Warner Bros. Pictures
- Release date: December 13, 1941
- Running time: 67 minutes
- Country: United States
- Language: English

Steel Against the Sky is a 1941 American comedy film directed by A. Edward Sutherland, written by Paul Gerard Smith, and starring Lloyd Nolan, Alexis Smith, Craig Stevens, Gene Lockhart, Edward Ellis and Walter Catlett. It was released by Warner Bros. Pictures on December 13, 1941.

== Plot ==
Rocky and Pete Evans are following in their father's footsteps working on girders building a bridge for John Powers. Chuck, their brother, prefers using his brains over brawn in get rich quick schemes that usually fail. Chuck tries to interest Rocky in financing a plan by Professor Samson, who claims to have invented a new product called Samsonite, (named after him), which is as strong as steel and as flexible as rubber. Rocky is not interested in wasting his money. Chuck brings the Professor home and Pop Evans loans him $25. A lab is set up in the basement of the Evans home. Rocky is romantically interested in Helen Powers, the daughter of the bridge contractor, and invites her home for dinner. The three brothers humorously vie for the use of the bathroom before Helen arrives. Meanwhile, the Professor's experiments create small explosions at the Evans' house. Chuck is enchanted with Helen and decides to work on the bridge with Rocky as his boss. Rocky is attacked on the girders by a disgruntled employee and Chuck rescues him, thus, impressing Helen.

Completion of the job, on time, is threatened by an impending storm. Work begins around the clock. Rocky sees Chuck kissing Helen and is furious. The brothers fight. Pop is devastated by the rift between the boys, whom he has raised since he was widowed and disabled on the job. He blames Helen for toying with the feelings of the boys, when she goes to his house to explain. Helen tries to make amends by rejecting Chuck. The storm causes a problem on the bridge. Rocky and Pete climb the ice covered girders to attempt repairs. Pete slips and falls into the icy water. Rocky continues but also slips and is treacherously hanging by his safety belt. Chuck climbs the girders to rescue his brother and all is forgiven. Helen professes her love for Chuck and in the final scene they are married (They were married in real life for over 50 years.)

== Cast ==
- Lloyd Nolan as Rocky Evans
- Alexis Smith as Helen Powers
- Craig Stevens as Chuck Evans
- Gene Lockhart as John Powers
- Edward Ellis as Pop Evans
- Walter Catlett as Professor Sampson
- Howard Da Silva as Bugs
- Edward Brophy as Pete Evans
- Jackie Gleason as Cliff (uncredited)
- Julie Bishop as Myrt
