= Conflict (1945 film) =

1945 film with Humphrey Bogart directed by Curtis Bernhardt

- Theatrical release poster
- Directed by: Curtis Bernhardt
- Screenplay by: Arthur T. Horman; Dwight Taylor
- Based on: The story "The Pentacle" by Robert Siodmak; Alfred Neumann
- Produced by: William Jacobs
- Starring: Humphrey Bogart; Alexis Smith; Sydney Greenstreet
- Cinematography: Merritt B. Gerstad
- Edited by: David Weisbart
- Music by: Frederick Hollander
- Production company: Warner Bros. Pictures
- Distributed by: Warner Bros. Pictures
- Release date: June 15, 1945
- Running time: 86 minutes
- Country: United States
- Language: English
- Budget: $774,000
- Box office: $3,707,000

Conflict is a 1945 American black-and-white suspense film noir. A Warner Bros. production, it was directed by Curtis Bernhardt, produced by William Jacobs from a screenplay by Arthur T. Horman and Dwight Taylor, based on the story The Pentacle by Alfred Neumann and Robert Siodmak. It stars Humphrey Bogart, Alexis Smith, and Sydney Greenstreet. The film is the only pairing of Bogart and Greenstreet of the five in which they acted together where Bogart rather than Greenstreet is the villain or corrupt character. There is also a cameo appearance of the Maltese Falcon statue.

== Plot ==
On the surface, Richard and Kathryn Mason appear to be a happily married couple. But on their fifth wedding anniversary, Kathryn accuses Richard of having fallen in love with her younger sister, Evelyn Turner, who is visiting them. He does not deny it, but has resigned himself to leaving things as they are, since Kathryn certainly would not give him a divorce. Kathryn knows he knows it, and derides him further. At a party celebrating the couple's anniversary, hosted by family friend and psychologist Dr. Mark Hamilton, Evelyn meets with Mark's handsome young colleague, Professor Norman Holsworth. On the way home Kathryn slyly mentions to Evelyn that their mother is lonely, knowing that Evelyn will feel obligated to move back home. Angered, Richard crashes their car and suffers a broken leg.

Richard decides to take desperate action. He pretends to require a wheelchair even after his leg has healed. His puzzled physician, Dr. Grant, diagnoses the problem as psychological, not physical, and suggests exercise, so a car trip to a mountain resort is arranged. At the last minute, Richard contrives to stay home to finish some work.

Going on ahead, Kathryn stops by Hamilton's home and asks him to check in on Richard. Resuming her journey, Kathryn comes upon an abandoned parked car blocking the narrow, deserted mountain road. Unexpectedly, Richard walks threateningly out of the fog. The audience is left to imagine him killing her. Next he pushes her car down a steep slope; it dislodges some logs which crash down and hide it. He returns home in time to set up an alibi by meeting with an employee he had summoned to finish the work. In his presence he twice phones the resort, only to be told she has not arrived. He then notifies the police that she is missing.

Subsequently, things happen to make Richard wonder if Kathryn somehow survived. First, the police find a pickpocket in possession of a cameo ring that Richard and Evelyn identify as Kathryn's; the man admits to stealing it from a woman matching Kathryn's description, after her disappearance. Then Richard smells Kathryn's perfume in their bedroom, finds her key to a home safe, and opens it: her wedding ring is inside.

Mark suggests Richard and Evelyn join him on a fishing vacation to relieve the strain. Mark also invites Holsworth, who takes the opportunity to ask Evelyn to marry him. She is undecided. When she tells Richard, he believes her hesitation is because of him. He tells her he loves her, and that she must feel the same about him, but she strongly denies it. Later, realizing his mistake, he encourages Holsworth to try again.

Then a pawn shop claim ticket is mailed to Richard, addressed in what appears to be his wife's handwriting. At the pawn shop, he finds Kathryn's locket and her signature in the register, but when he returns with the police, the register is different and there is no locket. Finally, he sees a woman on the street who looks and is dressed like his wife. He follows her to an apartment, only to find that it is vacant, with no one inside.

Unable to reconcile these occurrences any longer, Richard returns to the crime scene to see once and for all if Kathryn's body is inside the car. But Hamilton and the police are waiting for him. Kathryn's body had been found and removed long before, and now Richard is arrested. Hamilton reveals that he had been onto Richard since Richard's initial interview with the police. Since Hamilton's suspicion wouldn't be enough to secure a conviction in a court of law, Hamilton and the police worked together to stage the events that made Richard suspect Kathryn was still alive, hoping he would return to look for her body, and thus prove he had known all along what happened to her.

== Cast ==
- Humphrey Bogart as Richard Mason
- Rose Hobart as Kathryn Mason
- Alexis Smith as Evelyn Turner
- Sydney Greenstreet as Dr. Mark Hamilton
- Charles Drake as Prof. Norman Holsworth
- Grant Mitchell as Dr. Grant
- Patrick O'Moore as Det. Lt. Egan
- Ann Shoemaker as Nora Grant
- Edwin Stanley as Phillips

== Production ==
According to author Aljean Harmetz in The Making of Casablanca: Bogart, Bergman, and World War II, Bogart disliked the Conflict screenplay and initially refused the role in the spring of 1943. When Jack Warner called Bogart to convince him to take the part, a stenographer transcribed the call. Bogart told Warner: "I'm sorry, Jack. I just can't do it. My stomach will not let me. I am an honest man and I have to be honest with myself in this manner. If you want to get tough with me ... I will feel that I have lost a friend." Bogart only accepted the role after Warner threatened to block production of Passage to Marseille or to cast a different actor in its lead role if Bogart would not appear in Conflict.

The movie was filmed in 1943, but its release was delayed until 1945 when a dispute over the rights to part of the story had been settled. In the meantime Warner Brothers decided to produce another movie on a similar theme, The Two Mrs. Carrolls, also starring Bogart and Smith, along with Barbara Stanwyck. Filmed in April–June 1945, it wasn't released until 1947.

== Reception ==
=== Box office ===
According to Warner Bros records the film earned $2,265,000 domestically and $1,442,000 in foreign markets.

=== Critical response ===
Critic Bob Porfiero in Film Noir: An Encyclopedic Reference to the American Style wrote in 1992: "The film is particularly memorable for the use of the song 'Tango of Love' as leitmotif to indicate the putative reappearance of Kathryn, with the background strings translating the scent of perfume; the opening tracking shot through the rain-soaked night up to the window of the Mason house, which allows the audience to eavesdrop on the dinner party; and the sinister appearance of Bogart as he steps out of the shadows to murder his wife." (The song in question, however, is actually the 1925 composition "Jalousie (Tango Tzigane)" by Danish composer Jacob Gade.)

In 2004 film critic Dennis Schwartz gave the film a mixed review, writing, "Humphrey Bogart plays a wife murderer in this flawed film noir. Director Curtis Bernhardt leaves the plot with too many artificial devices to be effective ... The only thing that can't be faulted was the earnest performances of Bogie as the tortured killer and the supporting cast of Warner Brothers regulars."
