= William Jacobs (producer) =

American film producer

- Born: October 31, 1887; Chicago, Illinois, U.S.
- Died: September 30, 1953 (aged 65); Beverly Hills, California, U.S.
- Occupations: Screenwriter; film producer

William Jacobs (October 31, 1887 – September 30, 1953) was an American screenwriter and producer for Warner Bros. He wrote 13 Hollywood films and produced 59 more, including musicals.

== Early life ==
Jacobs was born on October 31, 1887, in Chicago, Illinois. His father, Abe, was a stage manager at the Majestic Theatre in Chicago.

== Career ==
Jacobs joined Warner Bros. as a screenwriter in 1934. He wrote the scripts of several movies, including Song of the Saddle.

From 1938 to his death, Jacobs produced movies for Warner Bros. In 1940, he was the associate producer of Ladies Must Live. He was active as a producer until 1953. During those years, he produced 59 movies and musicals, including Calamity Jane, Over the Goal, Christmas in Connecticut, and Tea for Two.

== Personal life ==
Jacobs was predeceased by his wife in 1949. He resided at 1716 Chevy Chase Drive in Beverly Hills, California.

== Death ==
Jacobs died on September 30, 1953, in Beverly Hills, at age 65. His body was cremated, and his funeral was held at the Forest Lawn Memorial Park.

== Partial filmography ==
- Night of Terror (1933) (writer)
- The Unwelcome Stranger (1935) (writer)
- Swellhead (1935) (writer)
- The Big Noise (1936) (writer)
- Hot Money (1936) (writer)
- Song of the Saddle (1936) (writer)
- Treachery Rides the Range (1936) (writer)
- Down the Stretch (1936) (writer)
- Isle of Fury (1936) (writer)
- Over the Goal (1937) (writer)
- Dance Charlie Dance (1937) (writer)
- Talent Scout (1937) (writer)
- Penrod and His Twin Brother (1938) (writer)
- Sergeant Murphy (1938) (writer)
- Ladies Must Live (1940) (assoc. producer)
- Father Is a Prince (1940) (assoc. producer)
- River's End (1940) (assoc. producer)
- Always a Bride (1940) (assoc. producer)
- She Couldn't Say No (1940) (assoc. producer)
- Money and the Woman (1940) (assoc. producer)
- Calling All Husbands (1940) (assoc. producer)
- South of Suez (1940) (1940) (assoc. producer)
- Passage from Hong Kong (1941) (assoc. producer)
- A Shot in the Dark (1941) (assoc. producer)
- Here Comes Happiness (1941) (assoc. producer)
- The Nurse's Secret (1941) (assoc. producer)
- Underground (1941) (assoc. producer)
- Three Sons o' Guns (1941) (assoc. producer)
- Strange Alibi (1941) (assoc. producer)
- Shadows on the Stairs (1941) (assoc. producer)
- The Case of the Black Parrot (1941) (assoc. producer)
- The Great Mr. Nobody (1941) (assoc. producer)
- Nine Lives Are Not Enough (1941) (assoc. producer)
- Bullets for O'Hara (1941) (assoc. producer)
- Father's Son (1941) (assoc. producer)
- The Hidden Hand (1942) (assoc. producer)
- Escape from Crime (1942) (assoc. producer)
- Busses Roar (1942) (assoc. producer)
- Secret Enemies (1942) (assoc. producer)
- Always in My Heart (1942) (assoc. producer)
- Lady Gangster (1942) (assoc. producer)
- Murder in the Big House (1942) (assoc. producer)
- Bullet Scars (1942) (assoc. producer)
- I Was Framed (1942) (assoc. producer)
- Spy Ship (1942) (assoc. producer)
- Find the Blackmailer (1943) (assoc. producer)
- The Gorilla Man (1943) (assoc. producer)
- Truck Busters (1943) (assoc. producer)
- The Mysterious Doctor (1943) (assoc. producer)
- Murder on the Waterfront (1943) (assoc. producer)
- Adventure in Iraq (1943) (assoc. producer)
- Crime by Night (1944) (assoc. producer)
- The Last Ride (1945) (producer)
- Shine On, Harvest Moon (1945) (producer)
- Conflict (1945) (assoc. producer)
- Christmas in Connecticut (1945) (producer)
- Danger Signal (1945) (producer)
- Too Young to Know (1945) (producer)
- Never Say Goodbye (1946) (producer)
- The Verdict (1946) (producer)
- Shadow of a Woman (1946) (assoc. producer)
- Nora Prentiss (1947) (producer)
- Love and Learn (1947) (producer)
- My Wild Irish Rose (1947) (producer)
- April Showers (1948) (producer)
- Look for the Silver Lining (1949) (producer)
- Story of Seabiscuit (1949) (producer)
- Whiplash (1949) (producer)
- Rocky Mountain (1950) (producer)
- Tea for Two (1950) (producer)
- The Daughter of Rosie O'Grady (1950) (producer)
- Close to My Heart (1951) (producer)
- Lullaby of Broadway (1951) (producer)
- On Moonlight Bay (1951) (producer)
- Painting the Clouds with Sunshine (1951) (producer)
- About Face (1951) (producer)
- She's Working Her Way Through College (1951) (producer)
- April in Paris (1953) (producer)
- Calamity Jane (1953) (producer)
- By the Light of the Silvery Moon (1953) (producer)
