= Anna Steese Richardson =

American writer and editor (1865–1949)

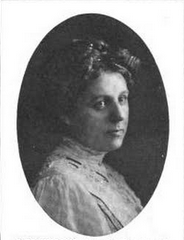
- Richardson circa 1913
- Born: April 5, 1865; Massillon, Ohio, United States
- Died: May 10, 1949 (aged 84); New York, New York, United States
- Occupations: Journalist, editor, author, playwright, screenwriter

Anna Steese Richardson (April 5, 1865 – May 10, 1949) was an American journalist, editor, author, playwright, and screenwriter. She was associated with Woman's Home Companion for more than three decades, where she directed the magazine's Better Babies Bureau and wrote columns on citizenship and etiquette. Her work also included books on childcare, women's issues, and etiquette, as well as plays and screenplays.

== Early life and education ==
Anna Steese Sausser Richardson was born on April 5, 1865, in Massillon, Ohio. Following the death of her mother, she was raised by her aunts and grandmothers in Philadelphia, Pennsylvania. She attended the Philadelphia Normal School for Girls, and, after graduating in 1885, took a teaching job in Colorado.

== Career ==
=== Journalist ===
Richardson began her career as a newspaper reporter for The Daily Nonpareil in Council Bluffs, Iowa. From 1898 to 1900, she wrote for the Omaha Daily News. In 1900, she moved to New York and began writing for the New York World. She left the newspaper and joined the Woman's Home Companion in 1903. Richardson remained with the magazine for the next three decades.

In the August 1913 issue of the Woman's Home Companion, Richardson introduced the Better Babies Bureau. In the United States in the early 20th century, for every 1,000 live births, 100 infants died before the age of one. The Better Babies Bureau sought to improve infant health by educating its women readers. In 1914, the magazine asked statistician Frederick S. Crum to create a set of standards for judging the health of babies. The resulting score sheet was based on the mental development, physical defects, and physical development for children between 6 and 48 months old and reflected theories from the eugenics movement of the time. The Bureau promoted these standards to the organizers of state, county, and local fairs to be used in babies contests. Richardson served as the director of the Bureau, and it continued through the 1920s.

In 1918, during World War I, Richardson traveled to France where she was quartered with the American Expeditionary Forces (AEF). She wrote about her time with the AEF for the Woman's Home Companion as well as McClure's and the Pictorial Review.

In July 1920, Richardson began the Good Citizenship column in the Woman's Home Companion. The column was intended to educate women who had newly acquired the vote, but it also provided information on legislative issues affecting women. The initial article was titled "Good Citizenship, A Department for New Voters: How, When, and Why to Use the Ballot." Readers were encouraged to write in with questions, and the magazine made several pamphlets available through the mail. Written by Richardson, the pamphlets had titles such as "Registration and Voting" and "Taxes and Where They Go." In October 1921, the magazine sent out almost 10,000 pamphlets. Over time, the Good Citizenship column shifted from political education to focus on the civic activities of women's clubs. The column ended in 1938.

In 1926, Richardson created the Woman's Home Companion etiquette column. By 1936, when she was awarded an honorary degree of Master of Science in Business Administration by Bryant College in Providence, Rhode Island, Richardson was an associate editor of the Woman's Home Companion. In the same year, she received the Advertising & Selling Silver Medal for "distinguished exposition of advertising as a social force." In 1938, Richardson became Director of the Consumer Division at the Crowell-Collier Publishing Company, which published the Woman's Home Companion.

=== Book author ===
Between 1909 and 1930, Richardson published several nonfiction books on women's issues, childcare, and modern etiquette. Her first book, The Girl Who Earns Her Own Living (1909), was a vocational guide that provided information on careers such as dressmaking, library work, and telephone operating. Better Babies and Their Care (1914) included information on feeding, weaning, sleep, and other topics on infant care that Richardson had gathered from physicians, social workers, and psychologists. The writing in Why Not Marry? (1917) was described in a reivew in the Sunday Oregonian as "bright, clever and sparkling.” The book's chapters first appeared as editorials in the Pictorial Review.

A contemporary review of Standard Etiquette (1925) in the The New York Times found the rules of etiquette included in the book slightly out-of-date but comprehensive and accessibly written. Etiquette at a Glance (1927) was also reviewed by The New York Times and found to be business-like and comprehensive, with social situations arranged in alphabetical order.

=== Playwright and screenwriter ===
Richardson's first play was Miss Mosher of Colorado; or, A Mountain Psyche (1899). Her next play was The Love Leash (1913), a three-act comedy that she co-wrote with Edmund Breese. It was first produced at the Harris Theatre, New York, on October 20, 1913. In 1914, Richardson and Breese collaborated again to produce Love is Blind. In 1917, they co-wrote the play A Man's Home. A Man's Home was made into a movie in 1921.

In 1918, Richardson and Charles J. Wilson co-wrote the screenplay for Hell's End (1918). In 1934, Richardson returned to playwriting with Big Hearted Herbert, adapted with Sophie Kerr from a story by Kerr. Big-Hearted Herbert was made into a movie that same year, and Richardson and Kerr received screenwriting credit. In 1940, the film was remade and titled Father is a Prince.

== Personal life ==
Richardson married William M. Richardson on October 4, 1886, in Philadelphia, Pennsylvania. The couple had three children. A 1924 passport application records that Richardson and her husband divorced in June 1913; her 1949 obituary in The New York Times described her as a widow. Richardson died on May 10, 1949, in New York.

== Selected publications ==
=== Plays ===
- Miss Mosher of Colorado; or, A Mountain Psyche (1899).
- The Love Leash (with Edmund Breese) (1913).
- Love is Blind (with Edmund Breese) (1914).
- Big Hearted Herbert (with Sophie Kerr) (1934).

=== Books ===
- The Girl Who Earns Her Own Living (1909). New York: B. W. Dodge & Co.
- Better Babies and Their Care (1914). New York: Frederick A. Stokes Company.
- Adventures in Thrift (1916). Illustrated by Charles S. Corson. Indianapolis: The Bobbs-Merrill Co.
- Why Not Marry? (1917). Illustrated by Agnes Lee. Indianapolis: The Bobbs-Merrill Co.
- Standard Etiquette (1923). New York: Harper & Brothers.
- Etiquette at a Glance (1927). New York: D. Appleton and Co.
- A Manual for Club Women (1929). New York: L. C. Smith & Corona Typewriters, Inc.
- The Bride's Book of Etiquette (1930). New York: Harper & Brothers.
