= Big Hearted Herbert =

1934 domestic comedy film

- Film poster
- Directed by: William Keighley
- Written by: Lillie Hayward; Ben Markson
- Based on: play Big Hearted Herbert by Sophie Kerr and Anna Steese Richardson
- Starring: Aline MacMahon; Guy Kibbee
- Cinematography: Arthur L. Todd
- Edited by: Jack Killifer
- Music by: Leo F. Forbstein
- Production company: Warner Bros. Pictures
- Distributed by: Warner Bros. Pictures; The Vitaphone Corporation
- Release date: October 6, 1934
- Running time: 59-60 minutes
- Country: United States
- Language: English

Big Hearted Herbert is a 1934 domestic comedy film starring Aline MacMahon and Guy Kibbee as a middle-aged couple. It is based on the Broadway play of the same name by Sophie Kerr and Anna Steese Richardson, which was in turn based on the short story "Chin-Chin" by Kerr. It was remade in 1940 as Father Is a Prince.

== Plot ==
Herbert Kalness has worked hard to build up a successful plumbing supplies manufacturing company from nothing. His wife Elizabeth loves him dearly and is willing to put up with much. However, his grownup children, Alice and Junior, are put out by his constant complaining. Junior wants to go to college, but Herbert insists his son go to work for him in his business. Meanwhile, Alice has fallen in love with and wants to marry Andrew Goodrich, a Harvard graduate and lawyer (both qualities Herbert despises).

When Elizabeth arranges a dinner to get acquainted with the future in-laws, Herbert proceeds to antagonize everyone. So she decides to give him a taste of his own medicine. When he brings customers home for dinner, she and the rest of the family act just as obnoxiously to them as Herbert had to the Goodriches. He eventually capitulates, and domestic peace is restored.

== Cast ==
- Aline MacMahon as Elizabeth [Kalness]
- Guy Kibbee as Herbert [Kalness]
- Patricia Ellis as Alice [Kalness]
- Helen Lowell as Martha, a servant
- Phillip Reed as Andrew [Goodrich]
- Robert Barrat as Jim
- Henry O'Neill as Goodrich Sr.
- Marjorie Gateson as Amy Goodrich
- Nella Walker as Mrs. Goodrich
- Junior Durkin as Junior Kalness (as Trent Durkin)
- Jay Ward as Robert Kalness
- Hale Hamilton as Mr. Havens
- Claudia Coleman as Mrs. Havens
- George Chandler as Murphy

== Reception ==
Andre Sennwald, critic for The New York Times, called the film an "entertaining hearthside comedy" and praised Kibbee and MacMahon for their performances.
