= Ruth Ford =

American actress and model (1911–2009)

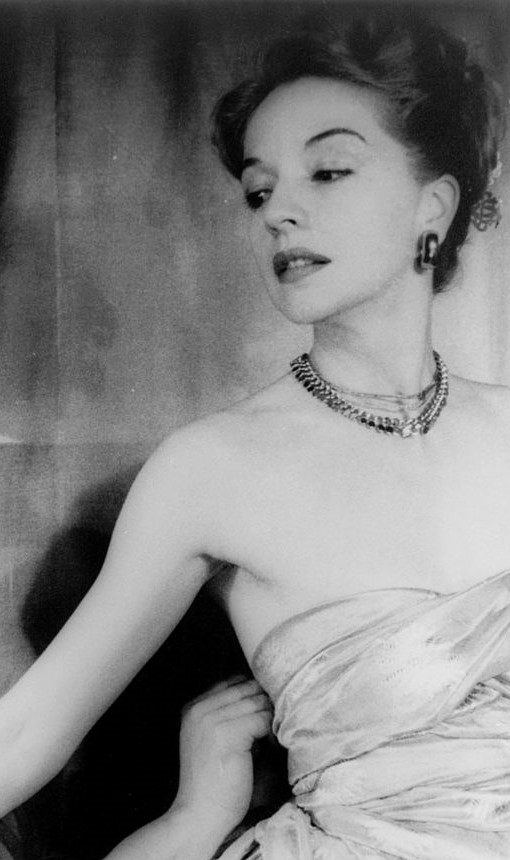
- Ford photographed by Carl Van Vechten in 1947
- Born: July 7, 1911; Brookhaven, Mississippi, U.S.
- Died: August 12, 2009 (aged 98); New York City, U.S.
- Education: University of Mississippi
- Occupations: Actress; model
- Years active: 1938–1985
- Spouse(s): Peter van Eyck (m. 1940; div. 19??) Zachary Scott (m. 1952; died 1965)
- Relatives: Charles Henri Ford (brother)

Ruth Ford (July 7, 1911 – August 12, 2009) was an American actress and model. Her brother was the bohemian surrealist Charles Henri Ford. Their parents owned or managed hotels in the American South, and the family regularly moved.

== Life and career ==
Born in Brookhaven, Mississippi, Ford was the daughter of Charles and Gertrude Cato Ford, who owned hotels in four towns in the South. She was a graduate of the University of Mississippi. Writer and artist Charles Henri Ford was her brother.

As a model, Ford posed for photographers Cecil Beaton, Man Ray, and Carl Van Vechten, among others.

She married actor Peter Van Eyck in 1940, but the marriage was unsuccessful. Van Eyck was the father of her daughter, Shelley, who was born in 1941. Before Ford's trip to Hollywood, she was a member of Orson Welles's Mercury Theatre, and appeared in his film Too Much Johnson (1938), which was considered lost until the rediscovery of footage in 2013. Welles's assistance helped her to land contracts with Columbia Pictures and Warner Bros. studios.

Ford's Broadway debut was in The Shoemaker's Holiday (1938). Among her other Broadway performances, she starred in Poor Murderer (1976).

Ford married film star Zachary Scott, and they remained together until Scott's death in 1965. Scott adopted Shelley, who took the name Shelley Scott. Zachary Scott reportedly died penniless except for a $100,000 insurance policy he left for his widow. Later, in the 1970s, she was involved in a relationship with a much younger man, writer Dotson Rader.

Ford, writing out Christmas cards by her courtyard window, was the first person to call 911 to report shots fired at the Dakota apartments after what turned out to be the murder of John Lennon.

Ford died in New York City on August 12, 2009, at age 98.

== Posthumous ==
In May 2010, it was reported, originally in The Wall Street Journal, that Ford's estate had been worth $8.4 million, almost all of it in the value of two apartments she owned in the Dakota building in Manhattan. One of the apartments had belonged to her brother Charles, who predeceased her. She bequeathed the apartments to her cook and butler, Indra Tamang, a Nepalese-American whom Charles Henri Ford had brought to New York. Ford's daughter and grandchildren reportedly were disinherited. Tamang sold the larger of Ford's Dakota apartments in 2011 for less than $4.5 million.

== Partial filmography ==
- Chloe, Love Is Calling You (1934) – Minor Role (uncredited)
- Too Much Johnson (1938) – Mrs. Billings
- Roaring Frontiers (1941) – Reba Bailey
- Secrets of the Lone Wolf (1941) – Helene de Leon
- The Man Who Returned to Life (1942) – Beth Beebe
- The Lady Is Willing (1942) – Myrtle Glossamer
- Lady Gangster (1942) – Lucy Fenton
- Murder in the Big House (1942) – Mrs. Irene Gordon
- In This Our Life (1942) – Mother of Accident Victim (uncredited)
- The Devil's Trail (1942) - Ella
- Escape from Crime (1942) – Myrt
- Secret Enemies (1942) – Miss Page (uncredited)
- Across the Pacific (1942) – Secretary (uncredited)
- The Hidden Hand (1942) – Estelle Channing
- The Gorilla Man (1943) – Janet Devon
- Truck Busters (1943) – Pearl
- Air Force (1943) – Nurse (uncredited)
- Murder on the Waterfront (1943) – Lana Shane
- Adventure in Iraq (1943) – Tess Torrence
- Princess O'Rourke (1943) – Clare Stillwell (uncredited)
- Wilson (1944) – Margaret Wilson
- The Keys of the Kingdom (1944) – Sister Clotilde
- Circumstantial Evidence (1945) – Mrs. Simms
- The Woman Who Came Back (1945) – Ruth Gibson
- Strange Impersonation (1946) – Jane Karaski #1
- Dragonwyck (1946) – Cornelia Van Borden (uncredited)
- Act One (1963) – Beatrice Kaufman
- The Tree (1969) – Mrs. Gagnon
- Play It As It Lays (1972) – Carlotta
- Too Scared to Scream (1985) – Irma (final film role)
