= Joan Winfield =

Australian American actress (1918–1978)

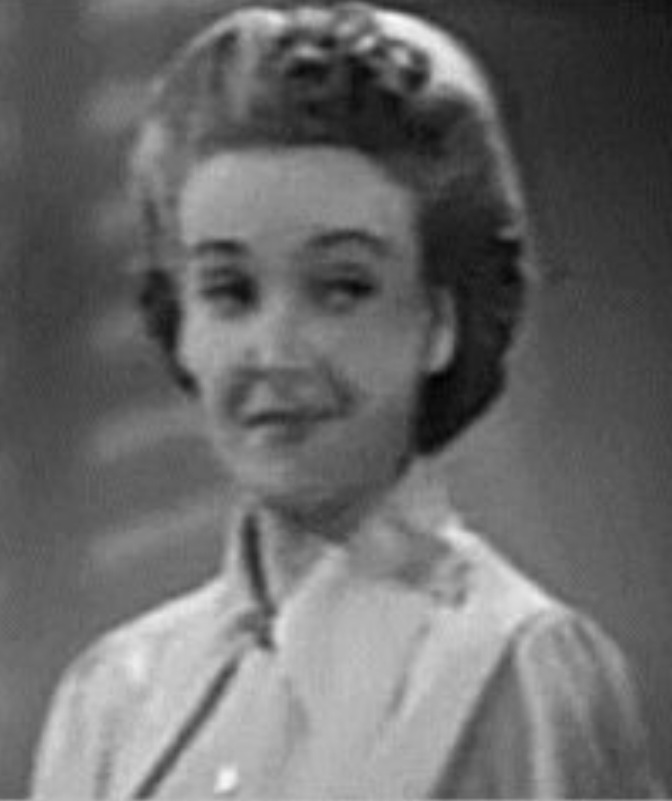
- Winfield in Lady Gangster (1942)
- Born: Joan Marie Therese MacGillicuddy; 24 September 1918; Melbourne, Australia
- Died: 16 June 1978 (aged 59); Van Nuys, California, U.S.
- Education: Royal Academy of Dramatic Art
- Occupation: Actress
- Years active: 1941–1957
- Spouse: John Meredyth Lucas (m. 1951)
- Children: 3

Joan Winfield (born Joan Marie Therese MacGillicuddy; 24 September 1918 – 16 June 1978) was an Australian-born actress and talented violinist, who appeared in Hollywood films in the 1940s, mostly in uncredited roles. She married director and writer John Meredyth Lucas in 1951.

== Childhood in Australia ==
She was born Joan Marie Therese MacGillicuddy and grew up in East Melbourne, the second daughter of Dr. Maurice MacGillicuddy and his wife Nell. Joan and older sister Mauricette attended Catholic Ladies College in nearby Grey St, East Melbourne. Her father was a well-known Melbourne doctor, and both parents were active in the Catholic Church and Melbourne charity work. As children, Joan and Mauricette were encouraged to develop a love of music. Mauricette was an accomplished pianist while Joan became a noted violinist while still in her teens. Joan also performed onstage in charity pantomimes in Melbourne in 1930 and 1931.

== Travel overseas and film career ==
In April 1936, Joan accompanied her parents and Mauricette to England. According to John Meredyth Lucas's memoirs, Maurice had discovered he had cancer, and decided to take the family for an extended trip overseas, to make the most of life while he could. Joan studied at the Royal Academy of Dramatic Art and was presented at Court in July 1937. In mid-1939 the family moved to New York. Lucas states Joan met a Warner Bros. talent scout at a New York party and soon found herself at work in Hollywood.

Joan's stage surname was changed by the studio ("Joan Winfield" was a character Bette Davis had played in The Bride Came C.O.D.) and she was offered several roles in B films at Warner Bros. She was presented by studio publicists as a stereotypical pin-up girl, supposedly popular with Australian soldiers. However, despite the positive publicity, most of her forty film appearances were minor or un-credited roles. She met John Meredyth Lucas on the set of one of these, the wartime spy drama The Gorilla Man, a B film made in 1943. They married in 1951 and raised three children, Elizabeth, Victoria and Michael.

== Later life ==
Most of Winfield's later films were bit parts, often in the films of father-in-law Michael Curtiz, the last being The Helen Morgan Story, made in 1957. In 1959, Lucas was offered the role of associate producer, director, and scriptwriter on the Australian TV series Whiplash, an imaginative retelling of the Cobb and Co story starring Peter Graves. Joan and John took their young family to Australia while the series was made, her first visit home in twenty-five years.

Joan devoted much of her later life to charity work, becoming President of the US charity SHARE. She developed lung cancer in the later 1970s and died, aged 59, in 1978.

Her sister, Mauricette, took the name Dale Melbourne and appeared on the New York stage.

== Selected filmography ==
- Bullets for O'Hara (1941) (credited role)
- Manpower (1941)
- Passage from Hong Kong (1941)
- The Smiling Ghost (1941)
- I Was Framed (1942)
- Yankee Doodle Dandy (1942)
- Lady Gangster (1942)
- The Gay Sisters (1942)
- The Big Shot (1942)
- Gentleman Jim (1942)
- The Gorilla Man (1943) (credited role)
- Mission to Moscow (1943)
- Murder on the Waterfront (1943) (credited role)
- Thank Your Lucky Stars (1943)
- The Adventures of Mark Twain (1944)
- Mr. Skeffington (1944)
- Rhapsody in Blue (1945)
- Of Human Bondage (1946)
- Night and Day (1946)
- A Stolen Life (1946) (credited role)
- The Unfaithful (1947)
- The Babe Ruth Story (1948)
- Johnny Belinda (1948)
- Breakthrough (1950)
- The Jazz Singer (1952)
- The Egyptian (1954)
- The Helen Morgan Story (1957)
