= Frank Wilcox =

American actor (1907–1974)

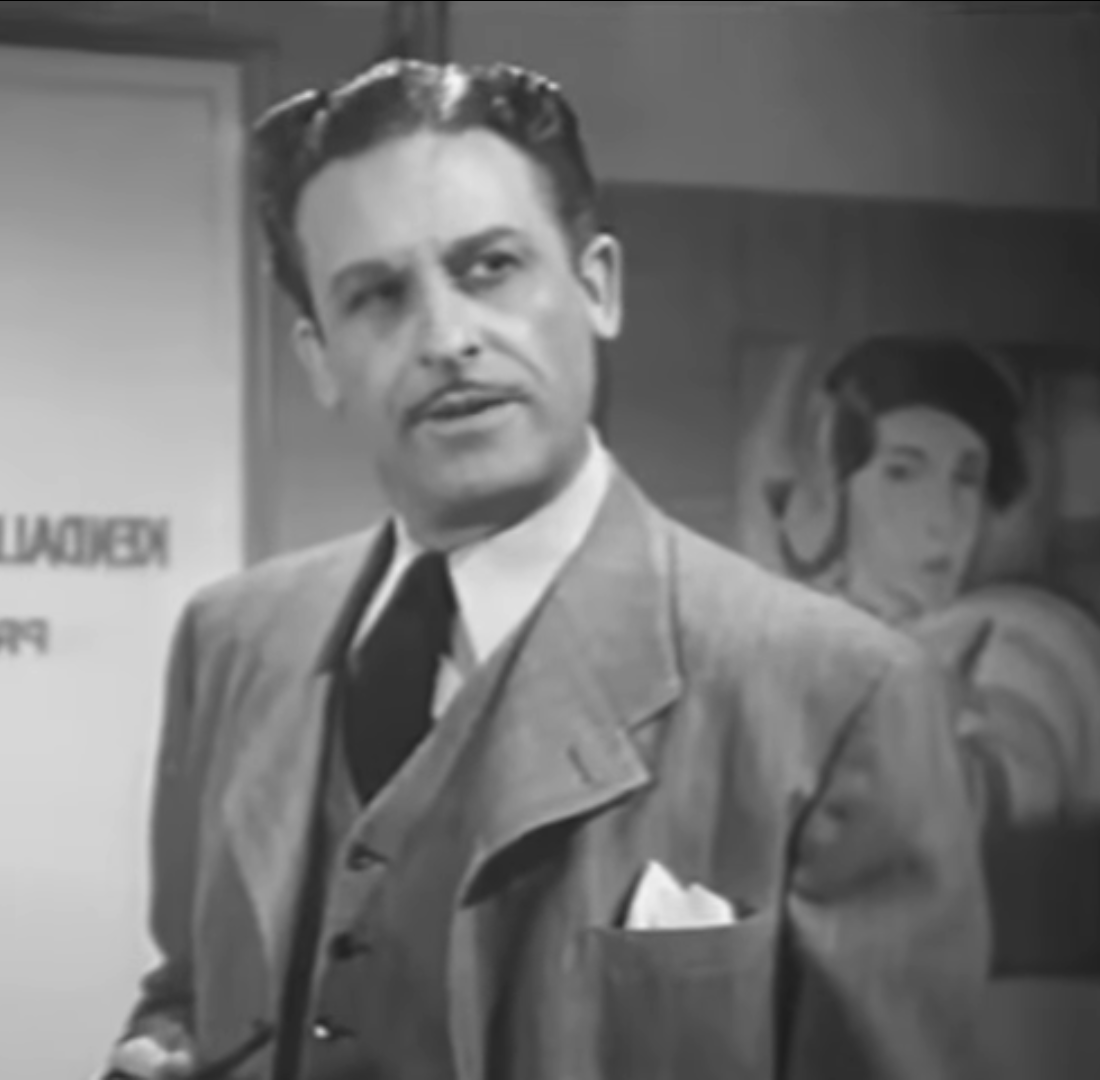
- Wilcox in Lady Gangster (1942)
- Born: Frank Reppy Wilcox; March 13, 1907; De Soto, Missouri, U.S.
- Died: March 3, 1974 (aged 66); Granada Hills, Los Angeles, California, U.S.
- Other name: Frank R. Wilcox
- Education: University of Kansas; Benedictine College; Pasadena Playhouse
- Occupation: Actor
- Years active: 1930–1973
- Spouse: Joy Langston (m. 1953)
- Children: 3

Frank Reppy Wilcox (March 13, 1907 – March 3, 1974) was an American actor. He appeared in numerous films and television series, as well as Broadway plays.

== Background ==
Wilcox was the son of Mr. and Mrs. Roger V. Wilcox. He was born in De Soto, Missouri, but the family moved to Atchison, Kansas. Wilcox worked in Kansas City as an oil company's sales manager.

== Acting career ==
Wilcox joined the Pasadena Community Playhouse. By December 1924, he headed the Frank Wilcox Company, which produced plays in venues that included the Lyceum in Baltimore. In 1927, he became a member of The Lambs Club.

Wilcox became a contract player for Warner Bros., beginning with the 1939 short film The Monroe Doctrine, in which he was chosen to portray the American statesman Henry Clay during the early 1820s. He played Abraham Lincoln as a militia captain in another 1939 film short Old Hickory, based on key events in the public career of President Andrew Jackson.

During World War II Wilcox served on a destroyer.

Another film role was as the circus doctor in the 1952 production The Greatest Show on Earth, starring Charlton Heston.

In 1951, already at work in television, Wilcox was cast in two episodes of the police drama Racket Squad. From 1952 to 1955, he guest-starred four times in different roles on the television series The Lone Ranger. In 1956, Wilcox portrayed John Gould in "God's Healing" on the religion Crossroads. The same year, he was cast as Duncan Glowrie in the episode "Bonnie Lassie" of The Gale Storm Show. From 1955 to 1958, he appeared three times on the sitcom The People's Choice.

In 1957, Wilcox guest-starred in the episode "Quicksilver" of Sugarfoot, as a young frontier law student. His best known television role, the one which brought him great recognition from millions of viewers, was that of the oil executive John Brewster in the first five seasons of The Beverly Hillbillies.

Wilcox appeared in 1957 as Joe Spaulding in "Lucy Wants to Move to the Country," one of the later episodes of the CBS sitcom I Love Lucy. He also appeared on the sitcom Private Secretary.

From 1953 to 1956, Wilcox made 16 appearances in different roles on The George Burns and Gracie Allen Show. He appeared three times in two different roles from 1961 to 1962 on Pete and Gladys. In 1965, he was a guest star in an episode of The Cara Williams Show.

In 1959, he was cast as Colonel Dodge in the episode "Man to Man" of Frontier Doctor. He guest-starred on the ABC sitcoms Leave It to Beaver, The Donna Reed Show and The Real McCoys. In 1960 he appeared on Wagon Train S3 E21 "The Tom Tuckett Story" as Colonel Barkley.

Wilcox made several guest appearances as a judge on Perry Mason during the nine-year run of that program. In 1961, he appeared as the judge on the "Jack Benny Show", titled "Jack on Trial for Murder", which had Raymond Burr as a guest star appearing as Perry Mason in a dream sequence where Jack dreams that he is on trial for murder and Perry Mason is his defense attorney. Wilcox also appeared as a judge in the 1961 episode "The Dentist" of Angel and as Jennings is the 1961 episode "Troubleshooter" of Straightaway. Wilcox also appeared in numerous episodes of The Untouchables as Federal District Attorney Beecher Asbury. He appeared in a 1965 episode of Kentucky Jones and in the first episode broadcast of The Munsters. His last television role was as Judge Moon in a 1973 episode of Kung Fu.

His hometown of De Soto, Missouri hosts the Frank Wilcox Film Festival every March during the weekend closest to his birthday. An actor who performed with Wilcox, or those with "Wilcoxian" careers as character actors, serve as the guest host of the event.

Wilcox's work on Broadway began with Yes or No (1917) and ended with Parlor Story (1947).

== Personal life and death ==
Wilcox and his wife Joy had three daughters. On March 3, 1974, Wilcox died at his home 10 days before his 67th birthday in Los Angeles.

== Selected filmography ==
- Postal Inspector (1936) – Postmaster General
- The Roaring Twenties (1939) – Cabbie at Grand Central (uncredited)
- The Fighting 69th (1940) – Lt. Norman
- Calling Philo Vance (1940) – 2nd Reporter (uncredited)
- Virginia City (1940) – Union Outpost Soldier
- 'Til We Meet Again (1940) – Ass't. Purser
- Tear Gas Squad (1940) – Sergeant Crump
- Murder in the Air' (1940) – Hotel Clerk
- Gambling on the High Seas (1940) – Stone
- The Sea Hawk (1940) – Martin Barrett (uncredited)
- They Drive by Night (1940) – Reporter #1 (uncredited)
- River's End (1940) – Constable Kentish
- City for Conquest (1940) – Party Guest (uncredited)
- Father Is a Prince (1940) – Income Tax Investigator
- Lady with Red Hair (1940) – Defense Assistant (uncredited)
- Santa Fe Trail (1940) – James Longstreet
- Footsteps in the Dark (1941) – FBI Agent Harrow (uncredited)
- Knockout (1941) – Denning
- A Shot in the Dark (1941) – Naval Officer
- Strange Alibi (1941) – Reporter (uncredited)
- The Wagons Roll at Night (1941) – Tex
- Affectionately Yours (1941) – Tom
- Sergeant York (1941) – Sergeant (uncredited)
- Bad Men of Missouri (1941) – Funeral Minister (uncredited)
- Highway West (1941) – Murph – Motorcycle Cop
- The Smiling Ghost (1941) – Alan Winters in Photo (uncredited)
- Navy Blues (1941) – Seabag Inspection Officer (uncredited)
- Passage from Hong Kong (1941) – Clerk (uncredited)
- They Died with Their Boots On (1941) – Captain Webb
- Wild Bill Hickok Rides (1942) – Jim Martin – Ned's Lawyer
- Captains of the Clouds (1942) – Flight Lt. Wood (uncredited)
- Bullet Scars (1942) – Mike
- Lady Gangster (1942) – Kenneth Phillips
- Murder in the Big House (1942) – Randall
- Juke Girl (1942) – Truck Driver (scenes deleted)
- Flying Fortress (1942) – Judge at Hearing (uncredited)
- Wings for the Eagle (1942) – Stark
- Escape from Crime (1942) – Cornell
- Secret Enemies (1942) – Counter-Espionage Man
- Busses Roar (1942) – Detective Quinn
- Across the Pacific (1942) – Capt. Morrison
- The Hidden Hand (1942) – Dr. Lawrence Channing
- Truck Busters (1943) – Police Capt. Gear
- Edge of Darkness (1943) – Jensen (uncredited)
- The North Star (1943) – Cmdr. Petrov
- There's Something About a Soldier (1943) – Tom (scenes deleted)
- The Impostor (1944) – Prosecutor
- Chip Off the Old Block (1944) – Edward Storey (uncredited)
- The Fighting Sullivans (1944) – Officer (uncredited)
- Four Jills in a Jeep (1944) – Officer (uncredited)
- Follow the Boys (1944) – Capt. Williams (uncredited)
- The Story of Dr. Wassell' (1944) – Captain's Aide for Evacuation (uncredited)
- The Adventures of Mark Twain (1944) – Judge John Marshall Clemens (uncredited)
- Rainbow Island (1944) – Captain (uncredited)
- In the Meantime, Darling (1944) – Capt. MacAndrews (uncredited)
- Conflict (1945) – Robert Freston (uncredited)
- Night Editor (1946) – Douglas Loring
- Without Reservations (1946) – Jack (uncredited)
- Strange Triangle (1946) – Lawyer
- The Devil's Mask (1946) – Prof. Arthur Logan
- Notorious (1946) – FBI Agent (uncredited)
- Cloak and Dagger (1946) – American Officer (uncredited)
- Born to Speed (1947) – (uncredited)
- Dark Passage (1947) – Vincent Parry (picture in newspaper, uncredited)
- Dead Reckoning (1947) – Hotel Desk Clerk (uncredited)
- The Arnelo Affair (1947) – McKingby (scenes deleted)
- The Beginning or the End (1947) – Dr. W. H. Zinn
- Mr. District Attorney (1947) – Defense Attorney (uncredited)
- I Cover Big Town (1947) – Harry Hilton
- Hit Parade of 1947 (1947) – Show Character (uncredited)
- Philo Vance Returns (1947) – George Hullman
- High Barbaree (1947) – Co-Pilot (uncredited)
- Something in the Wind (1947) – Mr. Masterson (uncredited)
- Philo Vance's Secret Mission (1947) – Thaddius Carter (uncredited)
- Unconquered (1947) – Richard Henry Lee
- Cass Timberlane (1947) – Gregg Marl
- Gentleman's Agreement (1947) – Harry (uncredited)
- Her Husband's Affairs (1947) – Floorwalker (uncredited)
- Out of the Past (1947) – Sheriff Ed Douglas (uncredited)
- Always Together (1947) – Donn's Lawyer (uncredited)
- Blondie's Anniversary (1947) – Carter
- The Voice of the Turtle (1947) – Stanley Blake (uncredited)
- Caged Fury (1948) – Dan Corey
- The Miracle of the Bells (1948) – Dr. Jennings
- The Babe Ruth Story (1948) – Surgeon Refusing to Treat Dog (uncredited)
- The Return of October (1948) – Mr. Rawlins (uncredited)
- Let's Live a Little (1948) – Bennett's Salesman (uncredited)
- Slightly French (1949) – Starr (uncredited)
- South of St. Louis (1949) – Captain (uncredited)
- The Clay Pigeon (1949) – Dr. Matson – Navy Hospital Doctor
- The Fountainhead (1949) – Gordon Prescott (uncredited)
- House of Strangers (1949) – Minor Role (uncredited)
- Masked Raiders (1949) – Banker Corthell
- The Mysterious Desperado (1949) – Elias P. Stevens
- The Doctor and the Girl (1949) – House Surgeon (uncredited)
- All the King's Men (1949) – Public Relations Man (uncredited)
- Samson and Delilah (1949) – Lord of Ekron
- East Side, West Side (1949) – Frank Belmar (uncredited)
- Malaya (1949) – Naval Officer with Businessmen (uncredited)
- Key to the City (1950) – Councilman (uncredited)
- The Kid from Texas (1950) – Sheriff Pat Garrett
- Blondie's Hero (1950) – Capt. Masters (uncredited)
- Nancy Goes to Rio (1950) – Kenneth Berten (uncredited)
- Annie Get Your Gun (1950) – Mr. Clay (uncredited)
- Kiss Tomorrow Goodbye (1950) – Doctor (uncredited)
- Bunco Squad (1950) – Mike Finlayson (uncredited)
- Three Secrets (1950) – Charlie (uncredited)
- The Fuller Brush Girl (1950) – Roberts (uncredited)
- Chain Gang (1950) – Lloyd Killgallen (uncredited)
- Mister 880 (1950) – Mr. Beddington (uncredited)
- The Flying Missile (1950) – Maj. Kennedy (uncredited)
- Gambling House (1950) – Mr. Warren (uncredited)
- Belle Le Grand (1951) – John (uncredited)
- Payment on Demand (1951) – Mr. Drake (uncredited)
- Inside Straight (1951) – Zoe's Doctor (uncredited)
- Go for Broke! (1951) – HQ General (uncredited)
- Cavalry Scout (1951) – Matson
- As Young as You Feel (1951) – Joe (uncredited)
- Show Boat (1951) – Gambler Mark Hallson (uncredited)
- The Whip Hand (1951) – Bradford (uncredited)
- The Greatest Show on Earth (1952) – Circus Doctor
- Trail Guide (1952) – Regan
- The Treasure of Lost Canyon (1952) – Stranger (uncredited)
- Flesh and Fury (1952) – Businessman (uncredited)
- Deadline – U.S.A. (1952) – Senator (uncredited)
- Young Man with Ideas (1952) – Morton H. Clay (uncredited)
- The Half-Breed (1952) – Sands
- Scaramouche (1952) – Deputy DeCrillion (uncredited)
- Carrie (1952) – Maitre D' (scenes deleted)
- Ma and Pa Kettle at the Fair (1952) – Driver at Accident (uncredited)
- The Duel at Silver Creek (1952) – Dr. Clayton (uncredited)
- Rainbow 'Round My Shoulder (1952) – Sidney Gordon (uncredited)
- The Raiders (1952) – Sam Sterling
- Thunderbirds (1952) – Uncle David 'Dave' Garrett
- Ruby Gentry (1952) – Clyde Pratt
- The Mississippi Gambler (1953) – Judge (uncredited)
- The Story of Three Loves (1953) – Ship's Officer (segment "Equilibrium") (scenes deleted)
- Invaders from Mars (1953) – Pentagon Chief of Staff (uncredited)
- Code Two (1953) – Police Capt. Stark (uncredited)
- Pony Express (1953) – Mr. Walstron (uncredited)
- Affair with a Stranger (1953) – Dr. Strong (uncredited)
- The Kid from Left Field (1953) – Man at Bar (uncredited)
- The Man from the Alamo (1953) – Texas Patriot at Meeting (uncredited)
- China Venture (1953) – Capt. Dryden (uncredited)
- Those Redheads from Seattle (1953) – Vance Edmonds
- Three Young Texans (1954) – Bill McAdoo
- Dangerous Mission (1954) – Jeremiah Kern (uncredited)
- The Black Dakotas (1954) – Zachary Paige (uncredited)
- A Star Is Born (1954) – Frank (uncredited)
- Naked Alibi (1954) – Councilman Edgar Goodwin (uncredited)
- Black Widow (1954) – Zachary Paige (uncredited)
- Masterson of Kansas (1954) – Prosecutor (uncredited)
- Carolina Cannonball (1955) – Professor
- Abbott and Costello Meet the Keystone Kops (1955) – Rudolph Snavely (uncredited)
- The Eternal Sea (1955) – Cmdr. Calivin Durgin (uncredited)
- Trial (1955) – Lawyer #2 (uncredited)
- The Court-Martial of Billy Mitchell (1955) – Maj. Tom (uncredited)
- Meet Me in Las Vegas (1956) – Sands Co-Owner (uncredited)
- Uranium Boom (1956) – Floyd Gorman
- Never Say Goodbye (1956) – Dr. Barnes
- The Price of Fear (1956) – Courtney (uncredited)
- The Man in the Gray Flannel Suit (1956) – Hopkins' Physician (uncredited)
- Earth vs. the Flying Saucers (1956) – Alfred Cassidy (uncredited)
- The First Traveling Saleslady (1956) – U.S. Marshal Duncan
- A Strange Adventure (1956) – The Public Defender
- The Ten Commandments (1956) – Wazir
- Hollywood or Bust (1956) – Director (uncredited)
- 7th Cavalry (1956) – Maj. Reno
- Dance with Me, Henry (1956) – Father Mullahy
- Hell's Crossroads (1957) – Gov. Crittenden of Missouri
- Kelly and Me (1957) – George Halderman
- Beginning of the End (1957) – Gen. John T. Short
- Tip on a Dead Jockey (1957) – Shields (uncredited)
- Pal Joey (1957) – Col. Langley (uncredited)
- Man from God's Country (1958) – Beau Santee
- Johnny Rocco (1958) – Gordon Lane (uncredited)
- Leave It To Beaver (1958) - Season 1, Episode 24 "The State Versus Beaver" - Judge
- The Restless Gun (1959) - Episode "The Sweet Sisters"
- Good Day for a Hanging (1959) – Judge Frazer (uncredited)
- Go, Johnny, Go! (1959) – Harold Arnold
- North by Northwest (1959) – Herman Weitner (uncredited)
- The Jayhawkers! (1959) – Lieutenant at Checkpoint (uncredited)
- Please Don't Eat the Daisies (1960) – TV Interviewer (uncredited)
- Swingin' Along (1961) – Psychiatrist
- A Majority of One (1961) – Noah Putnam
- Rawhide (1961) – Mr. Draper in S3:E13, "Incident of the Promised Land"
- Rawhide (1961) – Marshal Cox in S3:E18, "Incident of the Running Iron"
- The Horizontal Lieutenant (1962) – General (uncredited)
- A Ticklish Affair (1963) – Bill (uncredited)
- Johnny Cool (1963) – FBI Agent (uncredited)
- I'll Take Sweden (1965) – Mr. Dow (uncredited)
- Million Dollar Duck (1971) – Bank Manager
