= Swing Hostess =

1944 film by Sam Newfield

- Original lobby card
- Directed by: Sam Newfield
- Written by: Louise Rousseau (original story) and Gail Davenport (original story); Louise Rousseau (screenplay) and Gail Davenport (screenplay)
- Produced by: Sigmund Neufeld (producer)
- Starring: See below
- Cinematography: Jack Greenhalgh
- Edited by: Holbrook N. Todd
- Music by: Jay Livingston; Ray Evans; Lewis Bellin
- Distributed by: Producers Releasing Corporation
- Release date: September 8, 1944
- Running time: 76 minutes
- Country: United States
- Language: English

Swing Hostess is a 1944 American musical comedy film directed by Sam Newfield for Producers Releasing Corporation and starring Martha Tilton, Iris Adrian, Charles Collins, Betty Brodel, Cliff Nazarro and Harry Holman. The film's sets were designed by the art director Paul Palmentola.

== Plot ==
A down-on-her-luck would-be singer keeps encountering roadblocks on her way to stardom. Judy Alvin has a fine voice but is no match for the politics of a musical producer pushing his girlfriend, the amazingly untalented Phoebe who has obtained employment by using a record of Judy's voice rather than hers.

Living at a theatrical boarding house with a variety of eccentric entertainers, Judy's best friend Marge is determined to find Judy a job to pay her bills that has something, anything, to do with music. A chance encounter with a Rock-Ola 3701 Master telephone juke box gets Judy employment at the company where the duties involve taking telephone calls from patrons of a bar selecting music to hear over loud speakers.

== Cast ==
- Martha Tilton as Judy Alvin
- Iris Adrian as Marge O'Day
- Charles Collins as Benny Jackson
- Cliff Nazarro as Bobo
- Harry Holman as Fralick
- Emmett Lynn as Blodgett
- Betty Brodel as Phoebe
- Claire Rochelle as Fralick's Secretary
- Paul Porcasi as Spumoni
- Terry Frost as Hank
- Philip Van Zandt as Merlini, the Magician
- Earle Bruce as Joe Sweeney
- Bob Gooding as 1st Butch, Speciality Act
- Walter Pietila as 2nd Butch, Speciality Act
- Gene Windson as 3rd Butch, Speciality Act
- Dave White as Chick, Chick and Chuck Dance Team
- John Evans as Chuck, Chick and Chuck Dance Team

== Soundtrack ==
- Martha Tilton - "Let's Capture That Moment" (Written by Jay Livingston, Ray Evans and Lewis Bellin)
- Martha Tilton - "Say It With Love" (Written by Jay Livingston, Ray Evans and Lewis Bellin)
- Betty Brodel - "Say It With Love"
- Martha Tilton - "I'll Eat My Hat" (Written by Jay Livingston, Ray Evans and Lewis Bellin) Also performed as an instrumental at the Tropics Club
- Martha Tilton, Iris Adrian, Earle Bruce, and Cliff Nazarro - "Highway Polka" (Written by Jay Livingston, Ray Evans and Lewis Bellin)
- Martha Tilton - "Got an Invitation" (Written by Jay Livingston, Ray Evans and Lewis Bellin)
- Martha Tilton - "Music to My Ears" (Written by Jay Livingston, Ray Evans and Lewis Bellin) Also sung twice by Betty Brodel
