= Betty Brodel =

American actress (1920–2024)

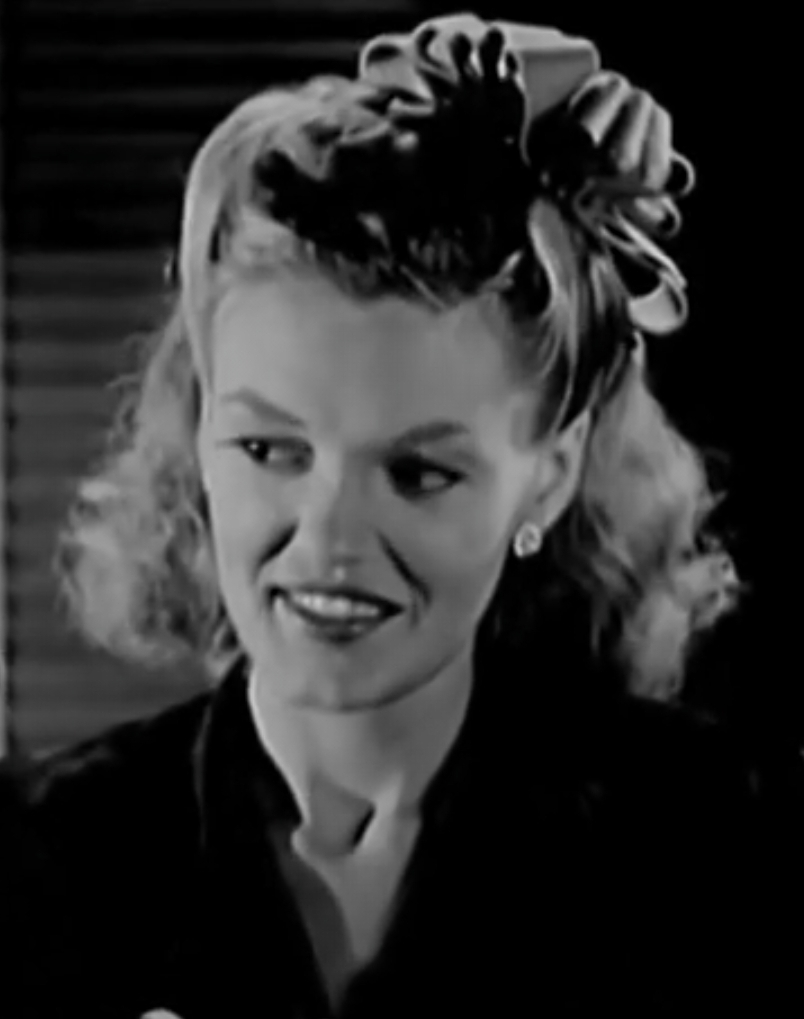
- Brodel in Swing Hostess (1944)
- Born: Elizabeth Ann Brodel; February 5, 1920; Detroit, Michigan, U.S.
- Died: March 3, 2024 (aged 104); Fort Walton Beach, Florida, U.S.
- Occupations: Actress; singer; vaudevillian
- Years active: 1936–1946 (film)
- Spouse: Joe Franzalia (m. 1948; died 1999)
- Children: 2
- Relatives: Joan Leslie (younger sister); Mary Brodel (older sister)

Elizabeth Ann Franzalia (née Brodel; February 5, 1920 – March 3, 2024), better known as Betty Brodel, was an American actress, singer and vaudevillian. She appeared in several films during a brief decade-long career, spanning from 1936 to 1946, during the Hollywood Golden Age.

== Early life and career ==
Elizabeth Ann Brodel was born in Detroit, Michigan, on February 5, 1920, to John (1883–1967) and Agnes Brodel (nee O' Hearn) (1888–1949). Her father was a bank clerk and her mother a homemaker and pianist. Betty and her older sister, Mary (1916–2015), shared their mother's musical interest and started to learn how to play instruments, such as the saxophone and the banjo, at an early age. They began performing in front of audiences in acts that included singing and dancing. They were later joined by youngest sister Joan (1925–2015) when she was just two and a half years of age.

With their father losing his job in the mid-1930s, the Great Depression caused financial difficulties for the family. As a result, the three sisters entered show business as vaudeville performers to support the family. They began touring in Canada and the United States. Collectively, they were known as The Three Brodels. As an attempt to bypass child labor laws at the time, both Mary and Joan pretended to be older than they were. When Joan was nine, she told child labor investigators that she was 16 years old.

All three sisters starred in the 1936 short film "Signing Off", before having successful solo film careers, with Joan becoming the most successful as a major star in Hollywood. Brodel's most significant film role was in 1944's Swing Hostess, where she played the supporting role of Phoebe, and had two singing numbers. She also appeared in Thank Your Lucky Stars (1943), Ladies Courageous (1944), Cover Girl (1944), Hollywood Canteen (1944), and Too Young to Know (1945). Her last feature film was Cinderella Jones in 1946.

== Personal life and death ==
In 1948, Brodel married Joe Franzalia, who died in 1999. They lived in Fort Walton Beach, Florida from 1963. Betty Brodel turned 100 in February 2020, and died on March 3, 2024, at the age of 104. She was survived by two children, three grandchildren and four great-grandchildren.

== Filmography ==
Year	Title	Role	Studio	Notes
1936	Signing Off	Herself		Short film
1943	Thank Your Lucky Stars	Girl in Ann Sheridan Number	Warner Bros.	Uncredited
1944	Ladies Courageous	WAF	Walter Wanger Productions	Uncredited
1944	Cover Girl	Chorus Girl	Columbia Pictures	Uncredited
1944	Swing Hostess	Phoebe	Sigmund Neufeld Productions	
1944	Hollywood Canteen	Herself	Warner Bros.	Uncredited
1945	Too Young to Know	Party Guest	Warner Bros.	
1946	Cinderella Jones	Red Cross Nurse	Warner Bros.	Uncredited
