= The Hidden Hand (1942 film) =

1942 film by Benjamin Stoloff

- Directed by: Benjamin Stoloff
- Screenplay by: Anthony Coldeway; Raymond L. Schrock
- Based on: Invitation to a Murder; 1934 play by Rufus King
- Produced by: William Jacobs
- Starring: Craig Stevens; Elisabeth Fraser; Julie Bishop
- Cinematography: Henry Sharp
- Edited by: Harold McLernon
- Music by: William Lava
- Distributed by: Warner Bros. Pictures
- Release date: November 7, 1942
- Running time: 63 minutes
- Country: United States
- Language: English

The Hidden Hand is a 1942 comedy horror film directed by Benjamin Stoloff, starring Craig Stevens, Elisabeth Fraser and Julie Bishop.

The film depicts a series of murders performed by a former patient of an insane asylum, with the complicity of his sister.

== Plot ==
John Channing is an escapee from an insane asylum. John's sister Lorinda hides him and has him dress up as a butler. She uses his lethal talents to dispose of her relatives, who all aspire to be heirs to her fortune, in order to allow her fortune to pass out of the family, afflicted by insanity, into the hands of her secretary, Mary Winfield and her fiancé Peter Thorne.

== Cast ==
- Craig Stevens as Peter Thorne
- Elisabeth Fraser as Mary Winfield
- Julie Bishop as Rita Channing
- Willie Best as Eustis the Chauffeur
- Frank Wilcox as Dr. Lawrence Channing
- Cecil Cunningham as Lorinda Channing
- Ruth Ford as Estelle Channing
- Milton Parsons as John Channing
- Roland Drew as Walter Channing
- Tom Stevenson as Horace Channing
- Marian Hall as Nurse Eleanor Stevens
- Inez Gay as Hattie (as Inez Gary)
- Kam Tong as Mallo

== Home video ==
In 2010, the film was released as by Warner Archive as part of the six-film DVD-R collection Warner Bros. Horror/Mystery Double Features.
