= Too Young to Know =

1945 film by Frederick de Cordova

- Theatrical release poster
- Directed by: Frederick de Cordova
- Screenplay by: Jo Pagano
- Story by: Harlan Ware
- Produced by: William Jacobs
- Starring: Joan Leslie; Robert Hutton; Dolores Moran; Harry Davenport; Rosemary DeCamp; Barbara Brown
- Cinematography: Carl E. Guthrie
- Edited by: Folmar Blangsted
- Music by: Heinz Roemheld
- Production company: Warner Bros. Pictures
- Distributed by: Warner Bros. Pictures
- Release date: December 1, 1945
- Running time: 86 minutes
- Country: United States
- Language: English

Too Young to Know is a 1945 American drama film directed by Frederick de Cordova, and written by Jo Pagano, and starring Joan Leslie, Robert Hutton, Dolores Moran, Harry Davenport, Rosemary DeCamp and Barbara Brown. It was released by Warner Bros. Pictures on December 1, 1945.

== Plot ==
Two newlyweds are separated for three years when the husband is called to fight in the war in the South Pacific. While there, he learns that his wife has left him and given away the son he never knew about. He quickly gets a pass and flies home, where a good-hearted judge helps the family reunite.

== Cast ==
- Joan Leslie as Sally Sawyer
- Robert Hutton as Ira Enright
- Dolores Moran as Patsy O'Brien
- Harry Davenport as Judge Boller
- Rosemary DeCamp as Mrs. Enright
- Barbara Brown as Mrs. Wellman
- Robert Lowell as Johnny Cole
- Arthur Shields as Mr. Enright
- Craig Stevens as Major Bruce
- Don McGuire as Lt. Yates
- Richard Erdman as Tommy
- Robert Arthur as Jimmy
- John Miles as Lt. Beal
- Larry Thompson as Transport Pilot
- Dorothy Malone as Mary
- Betty Brodel as Party Guest
