= A Man's Home =

1921 film

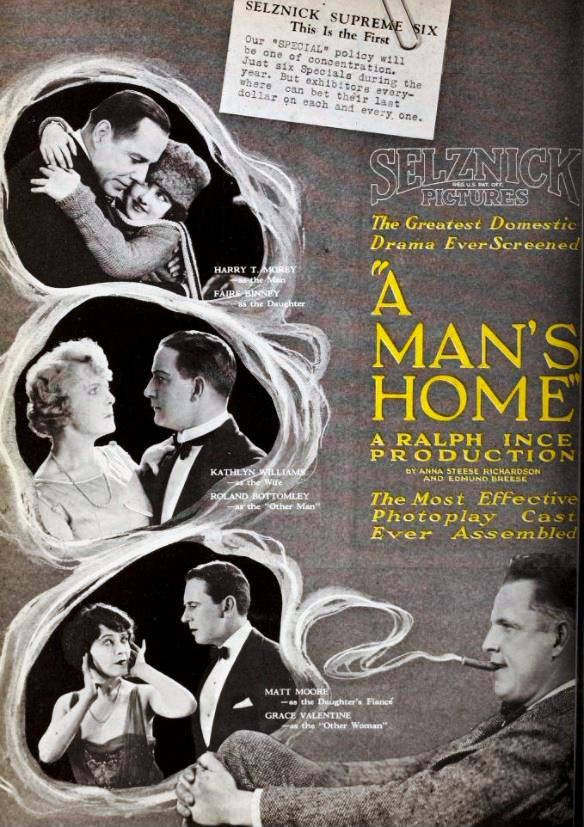
- Directed by: Ralph Ince
- Written by: Edward J. Montagne
- Based on: A Man's Home by Edmund Breese and Anna Steese Richardson
- Produced by: Lewis J. Selznick
- Starring: Harry T. Morey; Kathlyn Williams; Faire Binney
- Cinematography: William J. Black
- Production company: Selznick Pictures
- Distributed by: Select Pictures
- Release date: December 18, 1921
- Running time: 70 minutes
- Country: United States
- Languages: Silent; English intertitles

A Man's Home is a 1921 American silent drama film directed by Ralph Ince and starring Harry T. Morey, Kathlyn Williams and Faire Binney. It is based on the 1917 Broadway play of the same title by Edmund Breese and Anna Steese Richardson.

== Cast ==
- Harry T. Morey as Frederick Osborn
- Kathlyn Williams aFrances Osborn
- Faire Binney as Lucy Osborn
- Margaret Seddon as Amanda Green
- Grace Valentine as Dordelia Wilson
- Roland Bottomley as Jack Wilson
- Matt Moore as Arthur Lynn

== Bibliography ==
- Connelly, Robert B. The Silents: Silent Feature Films, 1910-36, Volume 40, Issue 2. December Press, 1998.
- Munden, Kenneth White. The American Film Institute Catalog of Motion Pictures Produced in the United States, Part 1. University of California Press, 1997.
