= Murder on the Waterfront =

1943 film by B. Reeves Eason

- Theatrical release poster
- Directed by: B. Reeves Eason
- Screenplay by: Robert E. Kent
- Based on: Without Warning; 1937 play by Ralph Spenser Zink
- Produced by: William Jacobs
- Starring: Warren Douglas; Joan Winfield; John Loder; Ruth Ford; Bill Crago; Bill Kennedy
- Cinematography: Harry Neumann
- Edited by: James Gibbon
- Music by: Howard Jackson
- Production company: Warner Bros. Pictures
- Distributed by: Warner Bros. Pictures
- Release date: September 18, 1943
- Running time: 51 minutes
- Country: United States
- Language: English

Murder on the Waterfront is a 1943 American drama film directed by B. Reeves Eason and written by Robert E. Kent. The film stars Warren Douglas, Joan Winfield, John Loder, Ruth Ford, Bill Crago and Bill Kennedy. The film was released by Warner Bros. Pictures on September 18, 1943.

== Plot ==
Joey and Gloria Davis get married, but Joey must report to service in the Navy before they can have their wedding night. Joey sneaks his new wife into a heavily secured camp which is watchful due to new top secret information. When a murder is found, the newlyweds find themselves involved in the investigation. A mystery ensues, and Gloria may be in danger.

== Cast ==
- Warren Douglas as Joey Davis
- Joan Winfield as Gloria Davis
- John Loder as Lt. Cmdr. Holbrook
- Ruth Ford as Lana Shane
- Bill Crago as Lt. Dawson
- Bill Kennedy as First Officer Barnes
- William B. Davidson as Capt. David Towne
- Don Costello as Gordon Shane
- James Flavin as Cmdr. George Kalin
