= Spy Ship (film) =

1942 film by B. Reeves Eason

- Theatrical release poster
- Directed by: B. Reeves Eason
- Screenplay by: Robert E. Kent
- Based on: Five Fragments; 1932 novel by George Dyer
- Produced by: William Jacobs
- Starring: Craig Stevens; Irene Manning; Maris Wrixon; Tod Andrews; Peter Whitney; John Maxwell
- Cinematography: Harry Neumann
- Edited by: James Gibbon
- Music by: William Lava
- Production company: Warner Bros. Pictures
- Distributed by: Warner Bros. Pictures
- Release date: June 6, 1942
- Running time: 62 minutes
- Country: United States
- Language: English

Spy Ship is a 1942 American Warner Bros. B picture drama film directed by B. Reeves Eason and written by Robert E. Kent. The film, a remake of Fog Over Frisco that was based on the short story The Five Fragments by George Dyer stars Craig Stevens, Irene Manning (playing a character based on Laura Ingalls), Maris Wrixon, Tod Andrews, Peter Whitney and John Maxwell. The film was released on June 6, 1942.

== Plot ==
A radio reporter begins to suspect that a commentator at his station may be using her position to broadcast shipping information to enemy spies. With the help of the girl's sister, he sets out to expose the spy and her Nazi gang.

== Cast ==
- Craig Stevens as Ward Prescott
- Irene Manning as Pam Mitchell
- Maris Wrixon as Sue Mitchell
- Tod Andrews as Gordon Morrel
- Peter Whitney as Zinner
- John Maxwell as Ernie Haskell
- William Forrest as Martin Oster
- Roland Drew as Nils Thorson
- George Meeker as Paul
- George Irving as Harry Mitchell
- Frank Ferguson as Burns
- Olaf Hytten as Drake
- Jack Mower as Inspector Bond
- Keye Luke as Koshimo Haru
