= Ladies They Talk About =

1933 film by William Keighley, Howard Bretherton

- Theatrical release poster by Alberto Vargas
- Directed by: Howard Bretherton; William Keighley
- Screenplay by: Brown Holmes; William McGrath; Sidney Sutherland
- Based on: Women in Prison based on a play by Dorothy Mackaye; Carlton Miles
- Produced by: Raymond Griffith (uncredited)
- Starring: Barbara Stanwyck; Preston Foster; Lyle Talbot
- Cinematography: John F. Seitz
- Edited by: Basil Wrangell
- Music by: Cliff Hess (uncredited)
- Production company: Warner Bros. Pictures
- Distributed by: Warner Bros. Pictures
- Release date: February 4, 1933 (US)
- Running time: 69 minutes
- Country: United States
- Language: English

Ladies They Talk About is a 1933 pre-Code American crime drama directed by Howard Bretherton and William Keighley, and starring Barbara Stanwyck, Preston Foster, and Lyle Talbot. The film is about an attractive woman who is a member of a bank-robbery gang. It is based on the play Gangstress, or Women in Prison by Dorothy Mackaye and Carlton Miles. In 1928, Dorothy Mackaye, #440960, served less than ten months of a one- to three-year sentence in San Quentin State Prison.

== Plot ==
Nan Taylor is a member of a gang of bank robbers, posing as a regular customer to distract the security guard while her accomplices take the money. Her cover is blown by a policeman who had arrested her before, and she is arrested again. Reform-minded radio star David Slade falls in love with her, and gets her released as a favor from District Attorney Simpson. When she confesses that she is guilty, though, Simpson has her imprisoned.

At San Quentin State Prison, Nan meets fellow inmates Linda, "Sister Susie", and Aunt Maggie, as well as prison matron Noonan. Slade continues to send Nan letters, but she refuses his entreaties. Meanwhile, Susie has a fancy for Slade, and resents Nan for spurning him. Her bank accomplice, Lefty, visits her, and tells her that Don is now imprisoned in the men's section on the other side of the wall. Lefty tells her to make a map of the women's section and a copy of the matron's key, so the men can escape via the women's section of the prison. Nan believes Slade told the prison officials about the escape plot and Don is shot dead as he gets to Nan's cell to break her out. Nan is given another year, and is not allowed visitors, but vows to seek revenge on Slade.

When she is released, Nan goes to a revival group meeting hosted by Slade. He is glad to see her, and she is escorted to a back room, where he professes his love for her. She scoffs and accuses him of turning in her bank robber accomplices. She shoots at him, but only hits him in the arm. Sister Susie sees this from outside from a keyhole, but Slade denies that he has been shot, and Slade and Nan announce their intention to marry.

== Cast ==
- Barbara Stanwyck as Nan Taylor
- Preston S. Foster as David Slade
- Lyle Talbot as Don, The Gangster
- Dorothy Burgess as Susie "Sister Susie"
- Lillian Roth as Linda, The Prisoner
- Maude Eburne as Aunt Maggie
- Ruth Donnelly as Prison Matron
- Harold Huber as "Lefty" Simons
- Robert McWade as District Attorney Simpson
- Madame Sul-Te-Wan as Mustard (uncredited)
- Grace Cunard as Marie, The Prisoner (uncredited)
- DeWitt Jennings as Detective Tracy (uncredited)

== Production ==
Unlike many other films of the women-in-prison genre, Taylor's fellow inmates are genuine criminals, rather than innocents in prison by mistake.

== Reception ==
The New York Times said, "When a reformer and a dashing female bank bandit fall in love, their home life may be somewhat as illustrated in the lingering finale of Ladies They Talk About, [...] After a torrid argument in which Nan, the gun-girl, accuses her beloved of frustrating a jail-break in which two of her pals were killed, she loses her temper, draws a gun from her handbag, and shoots him. 'I didn't mean to do that,' Nan remarks a moment later as David Slade falls to the floor with a bullet in his shoulder. 'Why, that's all right, Nan,' responds her husband-to-be. 'It's nothing.'" [...] "It is in the prison scenes that the film provides some interesting drama. Ladies They Talk About is effective when it is describing the behavior of the prisoners, the variety of their misdemeanors, their positions in the social whirl outside, their ingenuity in giving an intimate domestic touch to the prison, and their frequently picturesque way of exhibiting pride, jealousy, vanity, and other untrammeled feminine emotions."

== Remake ==
The film was remade in 1942 under the title Lady Gangster, starring Faye Emerson.
