= Coast Guard (film) =

1939 film by Edward Ludwig

- Theatrical poster
- Directed by: Edward Ludwig
- Written by: Richard Maibaum (screenplay); Albert Duffy; Harry Segall
- Produced by: Fred Kohlmar
- Starring: Randolph Scott; Frances Dee; Ralph Bellamy
- Cinematography: Lucien Ballard
- Edited by: Gene Milford
- Music by: M.W. Stoloff
- Production company: Columbia Pictures Corp.
- Distributed by: Columbia Pictures
- Release date: August 4, 1939
- Running time: 71 min.
- Country: United States
- Language: English

Coast Guard is a 1939 American adventure film released by Columbia Pictures, directed by Edward Ludwig and starring Randolph Scott, Frances Dee and Ralph Bellamy. It is set before World War II.

The Hollywood Reporter indicated that Frances Dee replaced Gene Tierney in the role of Nancy Bliss. Coast Guard was the first film of actor Michael Gale, who changed his name in 1941 to Craig Stevens.

== Plot ==
Lieutenant Raymond "Ray" Dower commands a United States Coast Guard cutter. His best friend in the Coast Guard, Lieutenant Thomas "Speed" Bradshaw, is a highly regarded, but reckless pilot. In a daring rescue at sea, both men are involved in saving Tobias Bliss, the captain of a tramp steamer. At the base hospital, the two officers visit the rescued man and meet Nancy, his granddaughter. Both friends fall in love with her, but Speed proposes first; broken-hearted, Ray still acts as the best man at the wedding.

The marriage falters, and when Nancy is fed up with many nights alone, she leaves Speed. In trying to win her back, Speed crashes while stunting over her house. Grounded and facing a court-martial, the disgraced pilot finds out that his best friend is missing while on an Arctic rescue mission. Nancy coaxes Speed and his co-pilot, O'Hara, to attempt a rescue, and after a harrowing crash-landing in the Arctic, an injured Ray is located. Speed manages a dangerous takeoff and flies his friend back home, to find a relieved Nancy waiting for him.

== Cast ==
As credited, with screen roles identified:

- Randolph Scott as Lieutenant Thomas "Speed" Bradshaw
- Frances Dee as Nancy Bliss
- Ralph Bellamy as Lieutenant Raymond "Ray" Dower
- Walter Connolly as Tobias Bliss
- Warren Hymer as O'Hara
- Robert Middlemass as Captain Lyons
- Stanley Andrews as Commander Hooker
- Edmund MacDonald as Lieutenant Thompson
- Lester Dorr as Second Officer (uncredited)

(Note: Other actors in uncredited roles include Ann Doran as a nurse, Raymond Bailey as First Officer, Don Beddoe as Proprietor, and Adrian Morris as First Expressman.)

== Production ==
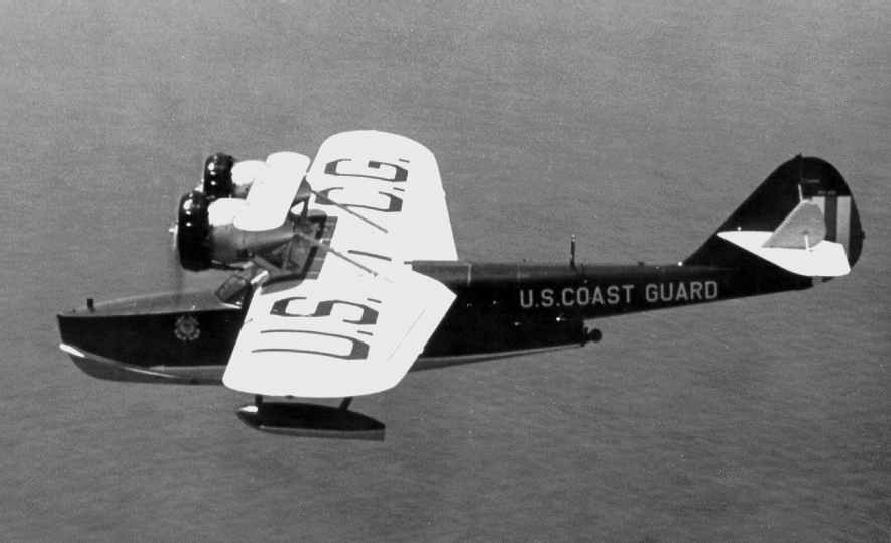
A U.S. Coast Guard Douglas RD-1 Dolphin.

Coast Guard was a period B film actioner, combining exciting coast guard rescues with a typical romantic sub-plot: "friends in love with girl, girl picks cad, romance in trouble, all is right in the end". An array of stock footage and model work is mixed in with live action. As one of the many serials, features and shorts that was based on the United States Coast Guard, the "B" feature was notable in that it featured a trio of rising stars, Randolph Scott, Ralph Bellamy (in another one of his "buddy" roles as the steady and dependable friend) and Frances Dee. Principal photography took place at the Columbia Studios and on location along the California coastline from April 26–June 16, 1939. Coast Guard highlighted the state-of-the-art rescue equipment used by the USCG, including the Douglas Dolphin seaplane.

== Reception ==
Leonard Maltin, in a later review, commented, "Routine but action-filled hokum with similarities to Capra's Dirigible."
