= Faye Emerson =

American actress (1917–1983)

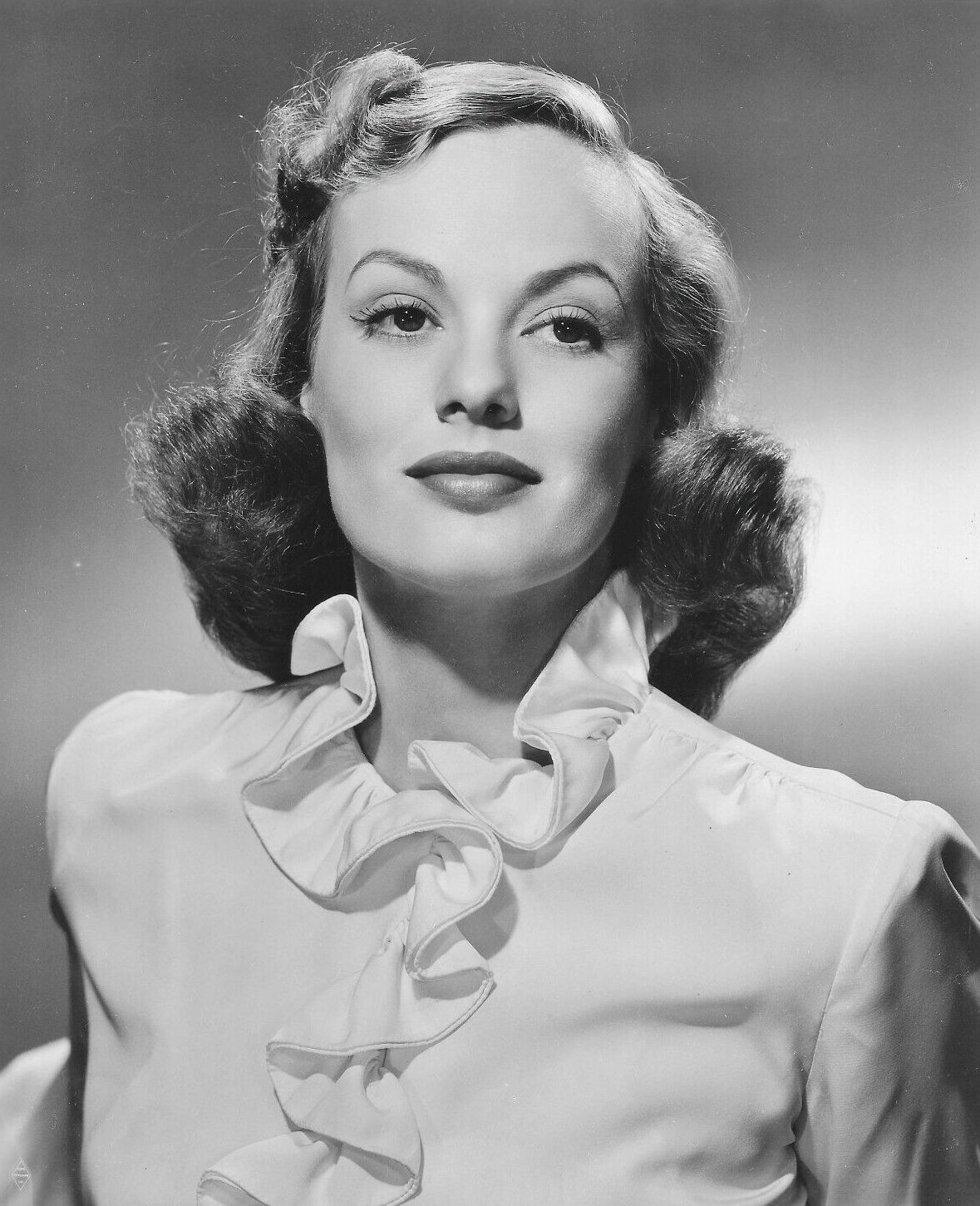
- Emerson in 1943
- Born: Faye Margaret Emerson; July 8, 1917; Elizabeth, Louisiana, U.S.
- Died: March 9, 1983 (aged 65); Deià, Spain
- Occupation: Actress
- Years active: 1941–1961
- Spouses: William Crawford (m. 1938–1942) Elliott Roosevelt (m. 1944–1950) Skitch Henderson (m. 1950–1957)
- Children: 1

Faye Margaret Emerson (July 8, 1917 – March 9, 1983) was an American film and stage actress and television interviewer who gained fame as a film actress in the 1940s before transitioning to television in the 1950s and hosting her own talk show.

Born in Louisiana, Emerson spent the majority of her early life in San Diego, California. She became interested in theater while attending San Diego State College and then pursued an acting career, appearing in stock theater in California. She signed a contract with Warner Bros. and began appearing in its films in 1941. She starred in several films noir, including Lady Gangster (1942) and Howard Hawks's war film Air Force (1943). In 1944, she played one of her more memorable roles as Zachary Scott's former lover in The Mask of Dimitrios. From 1944 to 1950, she was married to Elliott Roosevelt, son of Franklin Delano Roosevelt.

In 1949, Emerson began hosting The Faye Emerson Show, a late-night talk show series. Her prolific appearances on many talk shows and game shows throughout the 1950s earned her the nickname "The First Lady of Television". During the decade, she also appeared in numerous Broadway stage productions. Emerson formally retired from show business in 1963 and retired to Europe. She lived there until 1983, when she died of stomach cancer in Deià, Spain, aged 65. For her contributions to the motion picture industry, Emerson received a star on the Hollywood Walk of Fame in 1960. Her star is located at 6529 Hollywood Blvd.

== Early life ==
Faye Margaret Emerson was born July 8, 1917, in Elizabeth, Louisiana, the fifth child of Lawrence L. and Jean Emerson. The family moved frequently during her early years, including El Paso, Texas, and New Mexico, when she was an infant. Her parents separated when Emerson was three years old, and she went to Chicago in 1924 to live with her father and stepmother. At age 10, she moved to San Diego, California, to live with her mother, where she spent the remainder of her formative years.

She became interested in dramatics during her two years attending the Academy of San Luis Rey, a Roman Catholic convent and boarding school in Oceanside, California. She attended Point Loma High School, and for one year San Diego State College. Emerson joined the San Diego Community Theatre, and the St. James Repertory Theater, performing in summer stock productions in California. Emerson married her first husband, William Wallace Crawford, Jr., a naval aviator, on October 29, 1938. The couple had a son, William Wallace "Scoop" Crawford, III, in 1940.

== Film career ==
In 1941, while appearing in a stage production of Here Today at the San Diego Municipal Theater, Emerson was spotted by a talent agent from Warner Bros. studios. She subsequently signed a contract with the studio, appearing in bit parts before having supporting roles in Bad Men of Missouri and Nine Lives Are Not Enough (both released in 1941). She had her first starring role in a low-budget remake of the Barbara Stanwyck crime melodrama Ladies They Talk About (1933); Emerson took the Stanwyck role in Lady Gangster (1942).

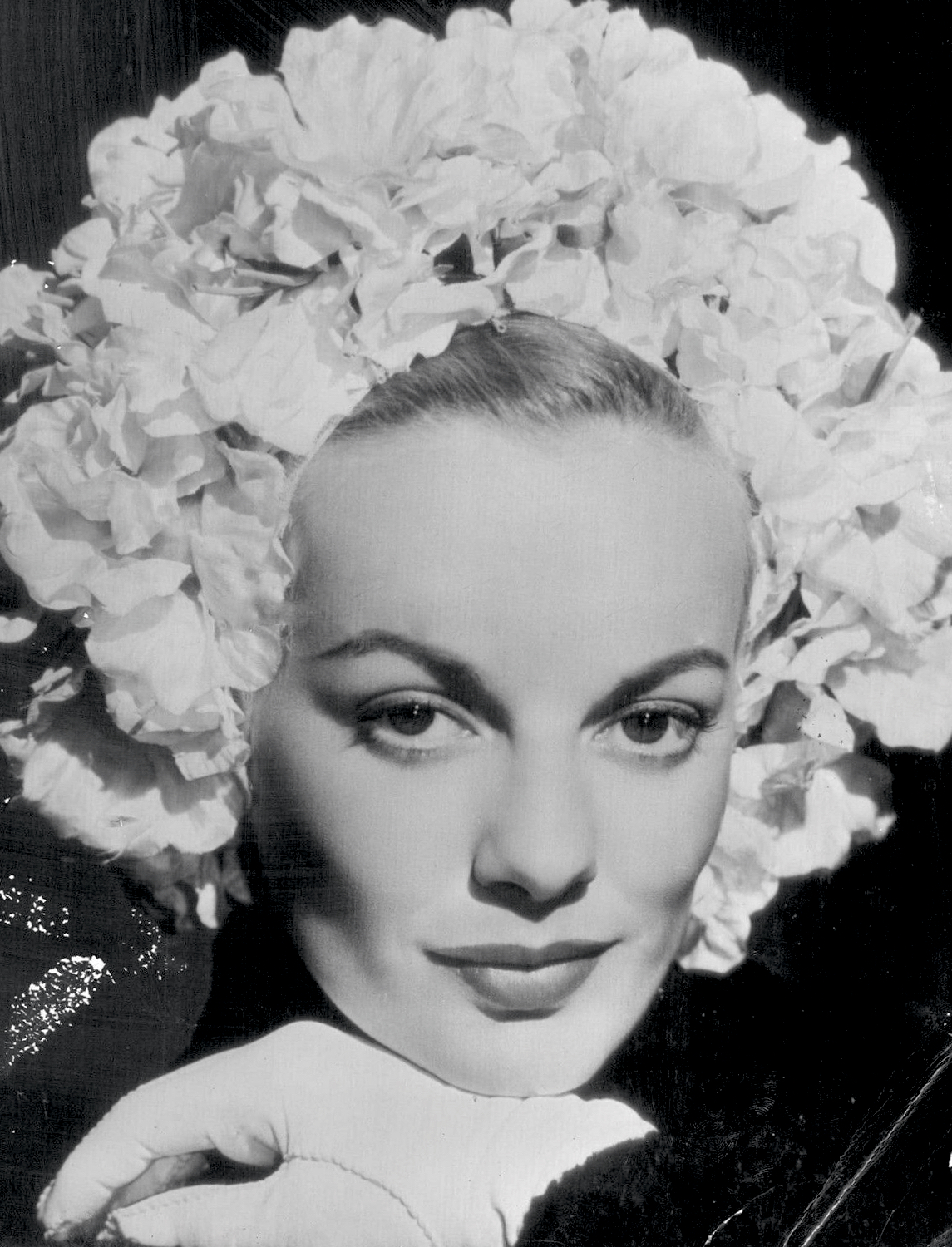
Emerson in 1945

In 1943, Emerson met President Franklin D. Roosevelt's son Colonel Elliott Roosevelt. Howard Hughes was instrumental in bringing the two together when Colonel Roosevelt visited the Hughes Aircraft Company to evaluate the proposed Hughes XF-11. Though Roosevelt was married, Emerson and he linked up, strongly urged on by the generous efforts of Hughes and his social facilitator, Johnny Meyer. Emerson later asserted that despite her doubts, Hughes urged her to advance the relationship, and she could not defy him. Emerson and Roosevelt married on December 3, 1944, at the rim of Grand Canyon, where she was filming Hotel Berlin. Hughes and Meyer provided the funding and airplanes for the wedding. When Roosevelt went back to Europe, he named his reconnaissance aircraft "My Faye". After some months in Beverly Hills in 1945, the couple resided with Eleanor Roosevelt at Hyde Park, New York.

Emerson continued to appear in a number of crime dramas, co-starring with Zachary Scott in three: The Mask of Dimitrios (1944), Danger Signal (1945), and Guilty Bystander (1950). She co-starred with John Garfield in the film noir Nobody Lives Forever and opposite Jane Wyman in Crime by Night. Murder in the Big House, made in 1942, was re-released in 1945 when co-star Van Johnson became a teen idol; the film was retitled Born for Trouble.

By 1947, Emerson's marriage to Roosevelt had begun to disintegrate. In late 1948, after having made her Broadway debut in The Play's the Thing, Emerson attempted suicide on Christmas Day 1948 by slitting her wrists, and was hospitalized. On January 12, 1950, she obtained a divorce from Roosevelt in Cuernavaca, Mexico.

== Television and theater ==
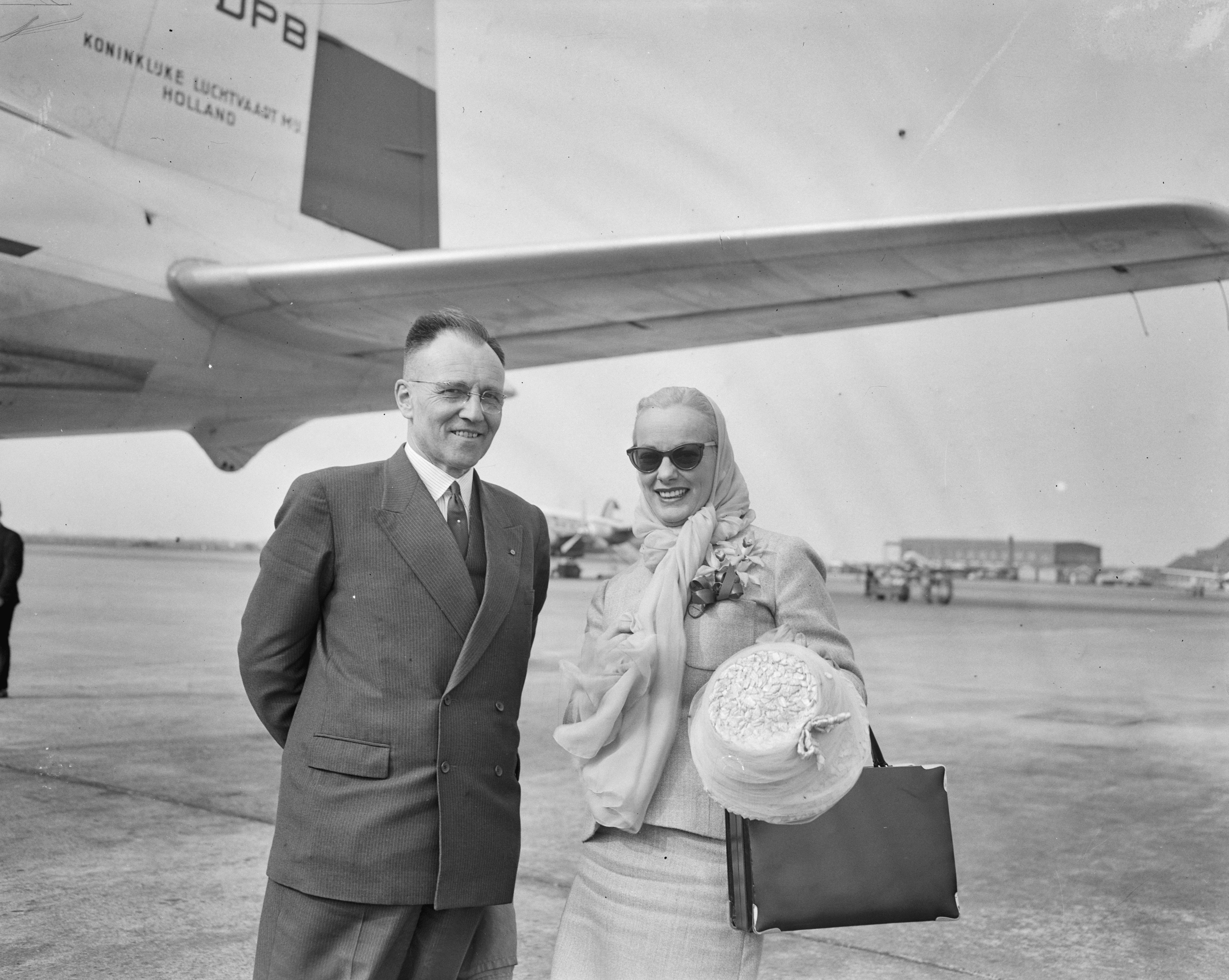
Emerson with Dutch mayor Jan Van der Dussen, 1956

In 1948, Emerson had transitioned to television and had begun acting in various anthology series, including The Chevrolet Tele-Theatre, The Philco Television Playhouse, and Goodyear Television Playhouse. She served as host for several short-lived talk shows and musical/variety shows, including Paris Cavalcade of Fashions (1948) and The Faye Emerson Show (CBS, 1950).

She was hostess and narrator of NBC's Cavalcade of Fashion from August 13 to December 16, 1948...The Faye Emerson Show (CBS) debuted on October 24, 1949 and ended, April 12, 1952. During that time, she was also a member of the glamour panel on NBC's Leave It to The Girls and a frequent guest on Who Said That. She was working steadily at both the networks. In addition to her CBS show, she starred in another Faye Emerson Show for NBC from April 15 to May 20, 1950. When it ended, she appeared on another for NBC: Fifteen with Faye.

In November 1948, Emerson hosted Paris Cavalcade Of Fashions, filmed for movie theaters and aired on NBC (Julie Gibson later replaced her). In 1949, Emerson began hosting The Faye Emerson Show, a 15-minute show, sometimes appearing on CBS and NBC simultaneously, which, though it lasted only one season, gave her wide exposure. According to author Gabe Essoe in The Book of TV Lists, on one of the show's segments, her low-cut gown slipped and "she exposed her ample self coast to coast." The show was broadcast from a studio CBS built on the sixth floor of the Stork Club building. The studio, a complete replica of the Stork Club's Cub Room, was built for The Stork Club, also seen on CBS beginning in 1950. The Stork Club aired 15 minutes before The Faye Emerson Show. Fifteen with Faye aired from June to August 1950 on NBC.

In 1950, Emerson married bandleader and conductor Lyle "Skitch" Henderson in Cuernavaca. After The Faye Emerson Show was canceled, she continued in television with other talk shows, including Faye Emerson's Wonderful Town (1951–1952), Author Meets the Critics (1952), and Faye and Skitch (1953–54), appearing in the latter with her husband. She made numerous guest appearances on various variety shows and game shows. Emerson hosted or appeared on many talk shows, usually wearing elaborate evening gowns. She was such a frequent panelist on game shows like To Tell The Truth and I've Got a Secret that she was known as "The First Lady of Television" (although that title was sometimes applied to others, including Ruth Lyons and Lucille Ball). During this time, Emerson was earning up to $200,000 per year.

Emerson and Henderson divorced in 1957 in Acapulco, Mexico. Former brother-in-law James Roosevelt wrote: "After an incident involving some teenage girls, [Skitch] was dropped from Johnny Carson's Tonight TV show, and his career went into eclipse. Emerson's marriage to Skitch hit the skids". However, the teenage incident happened before Carson's Tonight Show, which didn't begin until 1962, and Emerson had divorced Henderson in 1957. (Henderson had been dropped from Tonight in 1957, but it was the Steve Allen incarnation.)

While appearing on television throughout the 1950s, Emerson also appeared in numerous Broadway productions, including Parisienne (1950), The Heavenly Twins (1955), Protective Custody (1956), and Back to Methuselah (1958).

== Personal life ==
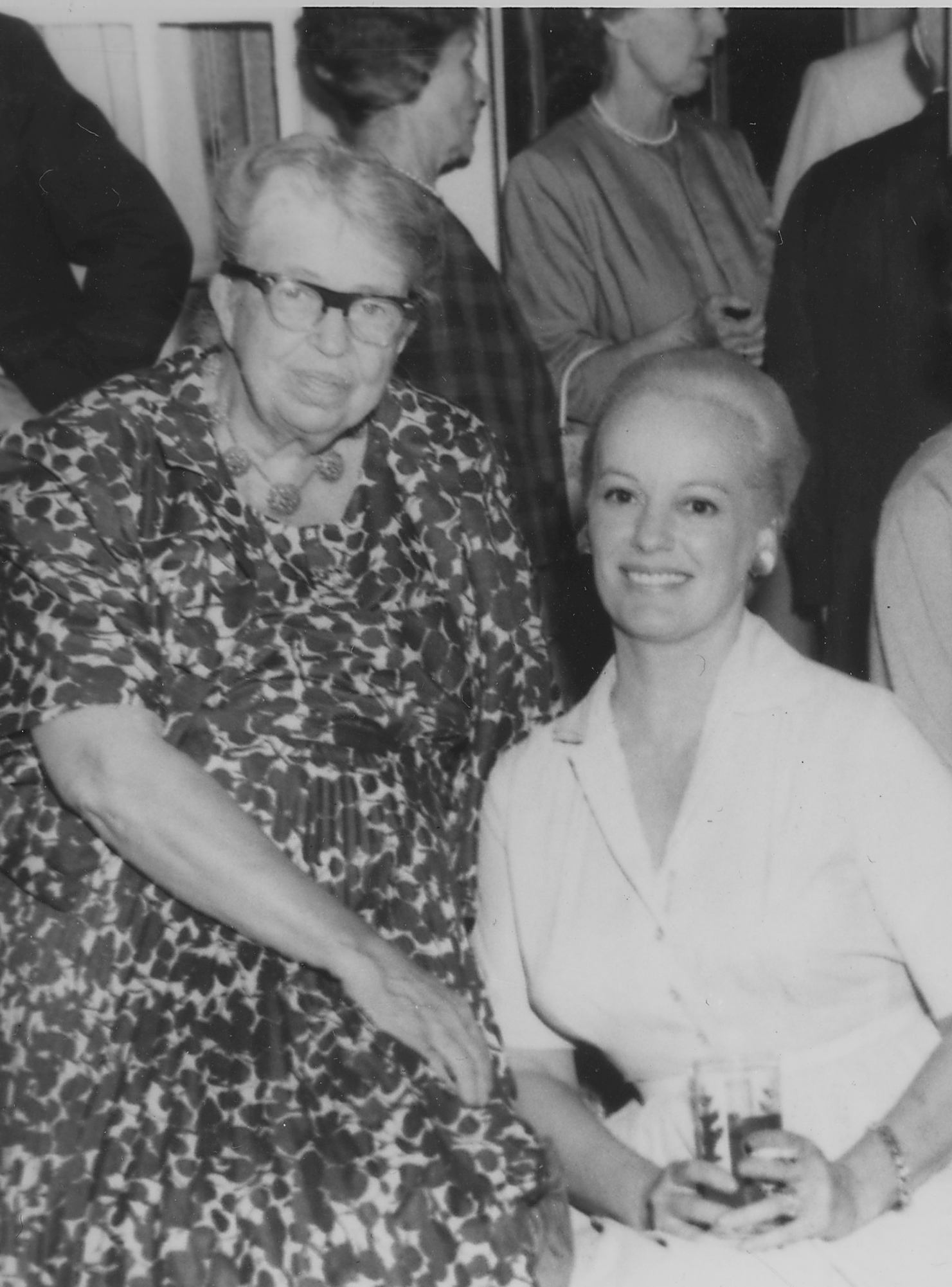
Eleanor Roosevelt and Faye Emerson, Hyde Park, New York, May 30, 1962

Emerson was married to auto dealer William Crawford from 1938 until 1942, and they had one son together.

She was married to writer Elliott Roosevelt, the son of President Franklin D. Roosevelt, from 1944 until 1950. By 1947, Emerson's marriage to Roosevelt had begun to disintegrate. After having made her Broadway debut in The Play's the Thing, Emerson attempted suicide on Christmas Day 1948 by slitting her wrists and was hospitalized. In January 1950, she obtained a divorce from Roosevelt in Cuernavaca, Mexico. Despite her former connection to the Roosevelts, Emerson supported Republican Dwight D. Eisenhower in the presidential election of 1952.

Emerson was married to Skitch Henderson from 1950 until 1957. In 1963, Emerson made her final television appearance and formally retired from show business. She moved to Europe, residing for a time in Switzerland and then settling in Spain in 1975. Emerson rarely returned to the United States and spent much of her time in seclusion. Emerson died on March 9, 1983, at age 65 from stomach cancer in Deià, Spain, where she had lived since 1975.

== Filmography ==
Year	Title	Role	Notes	Ref.
1941	The Great Lie	Enthusiastic Film Fan in Trailer	Uncredited	
1941	At the Stroke of Twelve	Miss LaMond	Short film	
1941	Affectionately Yours	Hospital Nurse	Uncredited	
1941	The Nurse's Secret	Telephone Girl		
1941	Bad Men of Missouri	Martha Adams		
1941	Manpower	Nurse Who Lost Draw	Uncredited	
1941	Nine Lives Are Not Enough	Rose Chadwick		
1941	Blues in the Night	Dr. Morse's Nurse	Uncredited	
1942	Wild Bill Hickok Rides	Peg – Chorus Girl		
1942	Lady Gangster	Dot Burton		
1942	Murder in the Big House	Gladys Wayne		
1942	Juke Girl	Violet 'Murph' Murphy		
1942	Secret Enemies	Paula Fengler		
1943	Women at War	Anastasia 'Stormy' Hart	Short film	
1943	Food and Magic	Girl in Audience	Short film; uncredited	
1943	The Hard Way	Ice Cream Parlor Waitress		
1943	Air Force	Susan McMartin		
1943	Find the Blackmailer	Mona Vance		
1943	Destination Tokyo	Mrs. Cassidy		
1943	The Desert Song	Hajy		
1944	In Our Time	Friend of Count Stephan in Nightclub	Uncredited	
1944	Uncertain Glory	Louise		
1944	Between Two Worlds	Miss Maxine Russell		
1944	The Mask of Dimitrios	Irana Preveza		
1944	Crime by Night	Ann Marlow		
1944	The Very Thought of You	Cora 'Cuddles' Colton		
1944	Hollywood Canteen	Herself		
1945	Hotel Berlin	Tillie Weiler		
1945	Danger Signal	Hilda Fenchurch		
1946	Her Kind of Man	Ruby Marino		
1946	Nobody Lives Forever	Toni Blackburn		
1950	Guilty Bystander	Georgia		
1953	Main Street to Broadway	Herself		
1957	A Face in the Crowd	Herself	Uncredited	

== Stage credits ==
Year	Title	Role	Notes	Ref.
1948	The Play's the Thing	Ilona Szabo	Booth Theatre	
1950	Parisienne	Clotilde	Fulton Theatre	
1955	The Heavenly Twins	Lucile Miremont	Booth Theatre	
1956	Protective Custody	Dolly Byrnes	Ambassador Theatre	
1958	Back to Methuselah	Zoo / Parlor Maid / Mrs. Lutestring / Eve	Ambassador Theatre	

== Radio and TV credits ==
Radio show host:

- That's A Good One, NBC-BLUE (1943)
- At Home With Faye And Elliott, NBC-BLUE (1946) (co-host: Elliott Roosevelt)

Radio show lead:

- My Silent Partner, NBC-Radio (1949)

TV show host:

- Paris Cavalcade Of Fashions, NBC-TV (1948) (also Narrator)
- The Faye Emerson Show CBS-TV, (1950)
- The Faye Emerson Show NBC-TV, (1950)
- Faye Emerson's Wonderful Town, CBS (1951–1952)
- Author Meets The Critics, DuMont-TV (1952) (Moderator)
- Youth Wants To Know, NBC (1952) (Jackie Robinson was a panelist on that show)
- Faye And Skitch, NBC-TV (1953–1954) (with Skitch Henderson)
- Of All Things, CBS-TV (1956)

TV game show panelist:

- I've Got A Secret, CBS (1952–1958)
- What's My Line, CBS (1952)
- Quick As A Flash, ABC (1953–1954)
- What's In A Word, CBS (1954)
- Masquerade Party (1958–1960)

== Sources ==
- Becker, Christine (Summer 2004). "Glamor Girl Classed as TV Show Brain: The Body and Mind of Faye Emerson" (PDF). Journal of Popular Culture. 4 (2). University of Notre Dame: 242–260. doi:10.1111/j.0022-3840.2004.00110.x.
- Blum, Daniel C. (1959). Pictorial history of television (PDF). Philadelphia: Chilton Co., Book Division. OCLC 469857274. "free download -->"
- Hansen, Chris (2012). Enfant Terrible: The Times and Schemes of General Elliott Roosevelt. Able Baker Press. ISBN 978-0615-66892-5.
- Hannsberry, Karen Burroughs (2012). Femme Noir: Bad Girls of Film. Jefferson, North Carolina: McFarland. ISBN 978-0-786-49159-9.
- O'Dell, Cary (1997). Women Pioneers in Television: Biographies of Fifteen Industry Leaders. Jefferson, North Carolina: McFarland. ISBN 978-0-786-40167-3.
- Roosevelt, James. My Parents: A Differing View. Playboy Press, 1976.
- Wead, Doug (2004). All the Presidents' Children: Triumph and Tragedy in the Lives of America's First Families. New York City, New York: Simon and Schuster. ISBN 978-0-743-44633-4.
