= Guilty Bystander =

1950 film by Joseph Lerner

- Theatrical release poster
- Directed by: Joseph Lerner
- Screenplay by: Don Ettlinger
- Based on: Guilty Bystander; 1947 novel by Wade Miller
- Produced by: Rex Carlton; Joseph Lerner
- Starring: Zachary Scott; Faye Emerson
- Cinematography: Gerald Hirschfeld; Russell Harlan (uncredited)
- Edited by: Geraldine Lerner
- Music by: Dimitri Tiomkin
- Production companies: Edmund L. Dorfmann Productions; Laurel Films; New York Film Associates
- Distributed by: Film Classics
- Release dates: March 22, 1950 (Los Angeles); April 20, 1950 (New York)
- Running time: 91 minutes
- Country: United States
- Language: English

Guilty Bystander is a 1950 American crime drama film noir directed by Joseph Lerner and starring Zachary Scott and Faye Emerson. It marked the last screen appearance for character actors Mary Boland and J. Edward Bromberg. The film was shot entirely on location in New York City.

== Plot ==
Max Thursday is an alcoholic former cop working as a house detective at his pal Smitty's rundown hotel. Max's ex-wife Georgia visits him in a panic because their young son Jeff and her brother Fred Mace are both missing. She was warned to not inform the police by Dr. Elder, Fred's business acquaintance.

While drunk, Max confronts Dr. Elder about his missing son, but the doctor knocks him unconscious from behind. Max awakens and is taken to police headquarters for questioning. Max soon learns that Dr. Elder has been killed and that he has become the prime suspect. Georgia gives the cops a false alibi for Max, and the police release him.

Now sober, Max learns that the doctor was involved in a diamond-smuggling operation with Varkas, a known criminal. He learns from Varkas' moll Angel that the gangster's men are holding Fred hostage. Max is shot in the arm by thugs working for Varkas, and Georgia stitches his wounds. When he recovers, Max goes to Varkas' warehouse to look for Mace, where he discovers that Varkas and his bodyguards are all dead.

Max finally realizes that his old friend Smitty is behind the entire scheme. Fred and little Jeff are rescued, and Max and Georgia reunite to welcome their son home.

== Cast ==
- Zachary Scott as Max Thursday
- Faye Emerson as Georgia
- Mary Boland as Smitty
- Sam Levene as Captain Tonetti
- J. Edward Bromberg as Varkas
- Kay Medford as Angel
- Jed Prouty as Dr. Elder
- Harry Landers as Bert
- Dennis Patrick as Fred Mace
- Ray Julian as Johnny

== Reception ==
In a contemporary review for The New York Times, critic Bosley Crowther wrote: "[T]he slow, sultry, steaming sadism that is usually standard in this type of film is rather effectively accomplished. The photography is full of heavy moods. And some of the melodramatic action, such as a chase in the subway, is good. ... Mind you, we aren't proclaiming 'Guilty Bystander' much of a film. But for those who want cheap melodrama, it has its considerable points."

Critic Philip K. Scheuer of the Los Angeles Times wrote: "[T]he going is sometimes turgid and draggy when it should be actionful. However, the picture has its moments, especially a between-stations chase in the New York subway."

In Dark City: The Film Noir, film historian Spencer Selby calls Guilty Bystander a "sleazy detective thriller" with "notable low-life settings."
