= Craig Stevens (actor) =

American actor (1918–2000)

- Stevens in 1959
- Born: Gail Shikles Jr. July 8, 1918; Liberty, Missouri, U.S.
- Died: May 10, 2000 (aged 81); Los Angeles, California, U.S.
- Education: University of Kansas
- Occupation: Actor
- Years active: 1939–1988
- Spouse: Alexis Smith (m. 1944; died 1993)

Craig Stevens (born Gail Shikles Jr.; July 8, 1918 – May 10, 2000) was an American film and television actor, best known for his starring role on television as private detective Peter Gunn from 1958 to 1961.

== Early life ==
Stevens was born in Liberty, Missouri, to mother Marie and father Gail Shikles, a high school teacher in Liberty and later an elementary school principal in Kansas City, Missouri.

Stevens initially studied dentistry at the University of Kansas, then majored in theatre at the University of Kansas at Lawrence.

== Acting career ==
=== Early roles ===
Acting with the university's drama club prompted him to halt his studies to audition in Hollywood. Under the name Michael Gale (a play on his first name), his first screen role was as a sailor in Coast Guard (1939). After this small role, he adopted the stage name Craig Stevens. For the next period of his film career, he played mainly secondary parts.

He could be glimpsed in Mr. Smith Goes to Washington (1939); Alice in Movieland (1940), a short at Warner Bros; Those Were the Days! (1940); Argentine Nights (1940); Lady with Red Hair (1940) at Warner Bros; and I Wanted Wings (1941), at Paramount.

=== WWII service ===
During World War II he served in the United States Army Air Corps' First Motion Picture Unit based in Culver City, California, acting in propaganda and training films. That unit came to be known as "The Culver City Commandos".

=== Warner Bros. ===
Stevens signed a contract with Warner Bros. They put him in Affectionately Yours (1941), then in Dive Bomber (1941); the latter starred his future wife Alexis Smith, although they shared no scenes in the film.

Stevens had a support role in Law of the Tropics (1941) and the lead in a short, At the Stroke of Twelve (1941). He was in The Body Disappears (1941) and was third billed in Steel Against the Sky (1941), with Smith top billed.

Stevens's first lead in a feature was Spy Ship (1942), a B movie. He followed it with leads in two other "B"s, Secret Enemies (1942), and The Hidden Hand (1942). He and Alexis Smith married on June 18, 1944.

He appeared in films like Three Cadets (1943), Learn and Live (1944), and Resisting Enemy Interrogation (1944). He also appeared in the training film How to Fly the B-26 Airplane (1944).

Stevens had a small role in Since You Went Away (1944) for David O. Selznick and The Doughgirls (1944) for Warners. He played himself in Warners' Hollywood Canteen (1944) and had the lead in the short subject Plantation Melodies (1945) playing Stephen Foster.

Stevens had support roles in Too Young to Know (1945), God Is My Co-Pilot (1945), Humoresque (1946), The Man I Love (1946), That Way with Women (1947), Love and Learn (1947), Night Unto Night (1948), and The Lady Takes a Sailor (1949).

=== Post-Warners ===
Stevens appeared on an episode of The Lone Ranger, (episode #35 in 1950 entitled "Bullets for Ballots"), then had support parts in Where the Sidewalk Ends (1950), Blues Busters (1950), Katie Did It (1951) and The Lady from Texas (1951).

Stevens guested on shows like Stars Over Hollywood, The Bigelow Theatre and Hollywood Opening Night as well as appearing in films like Drums in the Deep South (1951) and Phone Call from a Stranger (1951).

Increasingly, Stevens focused on television, appearing in The Unexpected, Gruen Guild Theater, Fireside Theatre, and Chevron Theatre.

Stevens had a lead role in the low budget Murder Without Tears (1953) and was the romantic male lead in Abbott and Costello Meet Dr. Jekyll and Mr. Hyde (1953). He had supporting roles in The French Line (1953) and Duel on the Mississippi (1955).

Stevens was in The Revlon Mirror Theater, The Lineup, The Star and the Story, The Eddie Cantor Comedy Theatre, Private Secretary, The Pepsi-Cola Playhouse, The Whistler, The Millionaire, Science Fiction Theatre, Matinee Theatre, Four Star Playhouse, Chevron Hall of Stars, The Ford Television Theatre, Jane Wyman Presents The Fireside Theatre , The Gale Storm Show: Oh! Susanna, Mr. Adams and Eve, The Silent Service, Lux Video Theatre, Studio 57, Alfred Hitchcock Presents, The Loretta Young Show, Schlitz Playhouse, and State Trooper.

On October 29, 1954, Stevens guest-starred on The Ray Bolger Show (1953–1955), an ABC sitcom with a variety show theme.

In 1956, Stevens and Smith toured the country in a musical Plain and Fancy. They later appeared in King of Hearts.

Stevens had the lead in the sci-fi classic The Deadly Mantis (1957) and was second billed in Buchanan Rides Alone (1958).

=== Peter Gunn ===
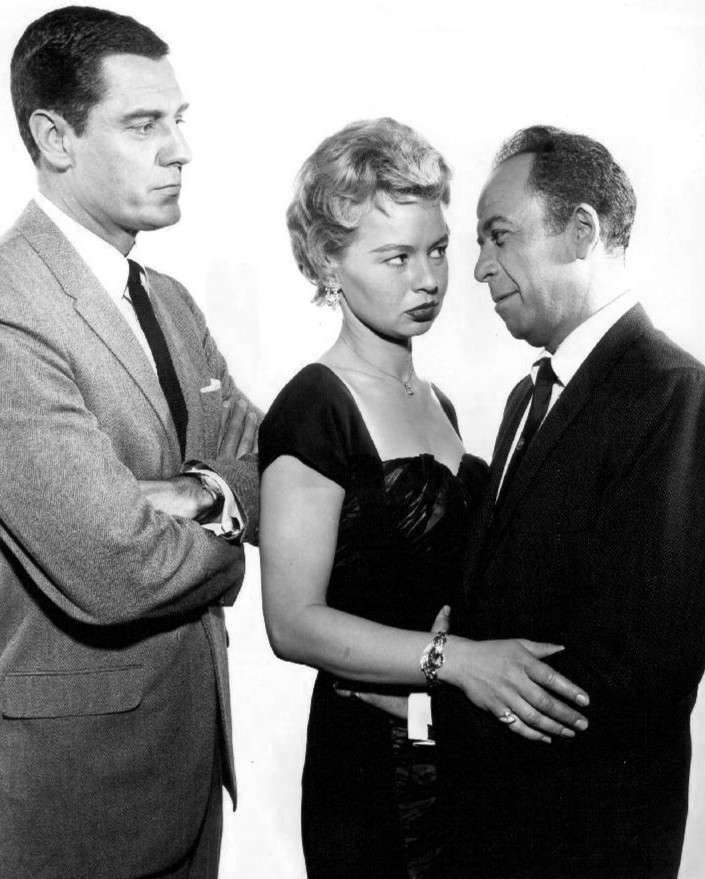
Craig Stevens as Peter Gunn (left) with guest stars Lari Laine and Lewis Charles (1959)

In 1958, after 19 years working in films, Stevens gained national prominence for his starring role in the private detective series Peter Gunn, which ran on NBC from September 1958 to September 1960 and then moved to ABC, where it continued for another year. The series was produced by Blake Edwards, who also wrote and directed many of the episodes. Edwards recalled he cast Stevens against type, similar to Dick Powell, who he worked with in Richard Diamond, Private Detective. He had Stevens get a crew cut and a new wardrobe The iconic theme music for the series was composed by Henry Mancini.

On May 7, 1959, Stevens was a guest star on the NBC variety series The Ford Show, Starring Tennessee Ernie Ford. He and Tennessee Ernie Ford performed a comedy skit based on Peter Gunn. He sang on The Dinah Shore Chevy Show with Dinah Shore.

During the run of Peter Gunn, Stevens guest starred on Special Agent 7, The Dinah Shore Chevy Show, and The Chevy Show. He shot a pilot called The Mighty O that was not picked up in 1961.

After the show ended he and Smith toured in a 13-week run of Critic's Choice from 1961 to 1962.

=== Man of the World and Mr. Broadway ===
After Peter Gunn ended, Stevens was called on by Sir Lew Grade of ITV to move to London, England, to play the lead role in the television series Man of the World in 1962. During 1963–64, he appeared in the Broadway musical Here's Love, which ran for 334 performances. In 1964, Stevens starred as Mike Bell in Mr. Broadway, a 13-week CBS drama series. In 1965, he and Smith toured on stage once more in a production of Mary, Mary.

Stevens and Blake Edwards brought Peter Gunn to the big screen in 1967 with the feature film Gunn. Though it was advertised as "Gunn-Number One", there were no sequels. In 1968, Stevens starred as the lead of the British spy thriller The Limbo Line (1968) based on the novel of the same title by Victor Canning.

=== TV guest star ===
Stevens shot an unsold pilot The Best Years, and guest starred on several television series including The Name of the Game; The Bold Ones: The Lawyers; McCloud; My World and Welcome to It; The Governor & J.J.; My Three Sons; To Rome with Love; Bracken's World; The Virginian; Gunsmoke; Marcus Welby, M.D.; Alias Smith and Jones; Medical Center; Owen Marshall, Counselor at Law; The Rookies; Here's Lucy; Love, American Style; Ellery Queen; The Snoop Sisters; Circle of Fear; Search; Faraday and Company; and Chase.

He later starred as Professor Higgins in a national touring production of My Fair Lady with Jane Powell. He also made lengthy national tours in Cactus Flower, co-starring again with his wife.

=== Later career ===
In 1974, Stevens appeared in the made-for-television film Killer Bees, co-starring with Gloria Swanson, Kate Jackson and Edward Albert. He co-starred with David McCallum in The Invisible Man for a single season on NBC during 1975–1976.

After the series ended, Stevens made many guest appearances on several TV series' including Starsky and Hutch, Gibbsville, Police Woman, and Project U.F.O.. He also had roles in Rich Man, Poor Man (1976) and Secrets of Three Hungry Wives (1978) and could be seen on The Incredible Hulk; Flying High; The Hardy Boys/Nancy Drew Mysteries; David Cassidy: Man Undercover; B.J. and the Bear; Dallas; The Tony Randall Show; Quincy, M.E.; Happy Days; Fantasy Island; Hotel; The Love Boat; Murder, She Wrote; and Supercarrier.

Stevens reunited with director Blake Edwards in the comedy film S.O.B. (1981). He also appeared in La truite (1982) directed by Joseph Losey and the TV movie Condor (1985).

Stevens's final acting appearance was in the TV movie Marcus Welby, M.D.: A Holiday Affair (1988)

== Personal life ==
On June 18, 1944, Stevens married actress Alexis Smith at the Church of the Recessional, Forest Lawn. They were married for 49 years, until her death in 1993. They had no children.

Stevens died of cancer at Cedars-Sinai Medical Center in Los Angeles, California, on May 10, 2000, at the age of 81.

== Legacy ==
The year after Stevens's death, funds were granted by his estate to the University of Kansas to endow the Alexis and Craig Stevens Performing Arts Scholarship in the school's theatre department. The scholarship provides financial aid to undergraduate and graduate students studying theatre.

His physical features and performance in the TV series Peter Gunn were the inspiration for the Dutch comics character Agent 327 by Martin Lodewijk.

== Partial filmography ==
- Coast Guard (1939) - Sailor (uncredited)
- Mr. Smith Goes to Washington (1939) - Senate Reporter (uncredited)
- Those Were the Days! (1940) - Second Passenger (uncredited)
- Argentine Nights (1940) - Gaucho (uncredited)
- Lady with Red Hair (1940) - Bit Role (uncredited)
- I Wanted Wings (1941) - Corporal (uncredited)
- Affectionately Yours (1941, unbilled) - Airline Official Talking to Ricky in Ambulance (uncredited)
- Dive Bomber (1941) - John Thomas Anthony
- Law of the Tropics (1941) - Alfred King, Jr.
- The Body Disappears (1941) - Robert Struck
- Steel Against the Sky (1941) - Chuck Evans
- Spy Ship (1942) - Ward Prescott
- Secret Enemies (1942) - Carl Edward Becker
- The Hidden Hand (1942) - Peter Thorne
- Learn and Live (1943) - Bob (uncredited)
- Since You Went Away (1944) - Danny Williams
- Resisting Enemy Interrogation (1944) - B-26 Pilot (uncredited)
- The Doughgirls (1944) - Craig Stevens
- Hollywood Canteen (1944) - Craig Stevens
- Roughly Speaking (1945) - Jack Leslie (uncredited)
- God Is My Co-Pilot (1945) - Ed Rector
- Too Young to Know (1945) - Major Bruce
- Humoresque (1946) - Monte Loeffler
- The Man I Love (1947) - Bandleader
- That Way with Women (1947) - Carter Andrews
- Love and Learn (1947) - Willard Deckerr
- Night Unto Night (1949) - Tony Maddox
- The Lady Takes a Sailor (1949) - Danvers (uncredited)
- Where the Sidewalk Ends (1950) - Ken Paine
- Blues Busters (1950) - Rick Martin
- Katie Did It (1951) - Stuart Grumby
- The Lady from Texas (1951) - Cyril Guthrie
- Drums in the Deep South (1951) - Colonel Braxton Summers
- Phone Call from a Stranger (1952) - Mike Carr
- Murder Without Tears (1953) - Detective Sergeant Steve O'Malley
- Abbott and Costello Meet Dr. Jekyll and Mr. Hyde (1953) - Bruce Adams
- The French Line (1953) - Phil Barton
- Duel on the Mississippi (1955) - René LaFarge
- From the Desk of Margaret Tyding (1956)
- Alfred Hitchcock Presents (1957) (Season 3 Episode 11: "The Deadly") - Lewis Brenner
- The Deadly Mantis (1957) - Colonel Joe Parkman
- Buchanan Rides Alone (1958) - Abe Carbo
- Gunn (1967) - Peter Gunn
- The Limbo Line (1968) - Richard Manston
- The Elevator (1974) - Dr. Stuart Reynolds
- Killer Bees (1974) - Rudolf van Bohlen
- S.O.B. (1981) - Willard
- The Trout (1982) - Carter
