= Crime by Night =

1944 Hollywood crime film

- Directed by: William Clemens
- Screenplay by: Richard Weil; Joel Malone
- Based on: Forty Whacks by Daniel Mainwaring
- Produced by: William Jacobs
- Starring: Jane Wyman; Jerome Cowan; Faye Emerson
- Cinematography: Henry Sharp
- Edited by: Doug Gould
- Music by: William Lava
- Production company: Warner Bros. Pictures
- Distributed by: Warner Bros. Pictures
- Release date: September 9, 1944
- Running time: 72 minutes
- Country: United States
- Language: English

Crime by Night is a 1944 American crime film directed by William Clemens starring Jane Wyman, Jerome Cowan and Faye Emerson. It tells the story of Sam Campbell (Jerome Cowan) and his secretary Robbie Vance (Jane Wyman), who take a vacation and uncover a murder.

== Plot ==
Larry Borden's career as a concert pianist ends when a dispute with wealthy father-in-law Harvey Carr winds up with Larry's hand being chopped off by an ax. Carr is found dead from a blow by an ax, and Larry is sure to be the prime suspect. He hires New York detective Sam Campbell and his secretary-partner Robbie Vance. Harvey's daughter (and Larry's ex-wife), Irene, also turns up, along with another dead body, the estate's handyman.

Irene is now engaged to Paul Goff, a singer, who has an agent, Ann Marlow. A theory develops that Carr's death involved a wartime spy ring and a chemical plant he owned, and Goff is implicated. Goff is the next murder victim, though. Sam and Robbie eventually deduce that Ann is the actual spy. They solve the case and save Larry, freeing them to return to New York.

== Cast ==
- Jane Wyman as Robbie Vance
- Jerome Cowan as Sam Campbell
- Faye Emerson as Ann Marlow
- Charles Lang as Paul Goff
- Eleanor Parker as Irene Carr
- Stuart Crawford as Larry Borden
- Cy Kendall as Sheriff Max Ambers
- Charles C. Wilson as District Attorney Hyatt

== Production ==
The film was based on the novel Forty Whacks by Geoffrey Homes. In December 1941 Warners announced they would film it as a vehicle for Humphrey Bogart instead of a sequel to The Maltese Falcon.

== See also ==
- List of American films of 1944
