= Secret Enemies =

1942 film directed by Benjamin Stoloff

- Theatrical release poster
- Directed by: Benjamin Stoloff
- Screenplay by: Raymond L. Schrock
- Produced by: William Jacobs
- Starring: Craig Stevens; Faye Emerson; John Ridgely; Charles Lang; Robert Warwick; Frank Reicher
- Cinematography: James Van Trees
- Edited by: Doug Gould
- Production company: Warner Bros. Pictures
- Distributed by: Warner Bros. Pictures
- Release date: September 17, 1942
- Running time: 57 minutes
- Country: United States
- Language: English
- Budget: $91,000
- Box office: $331,000

Secret Enemies is a 1942 American drama film directed by Benjamin Stoloff and written by Raymond L. Schrock. The film stars Craig Stevens, Faye Emerson, John Ridgely, Charles Lang, Robert Warwick, and Frank Reicher. The film was released by Warner Bros. Pictures on September 17, 1942.

== Plot ==
In 1941, German-born Henry Bremmer (Frank Reicher) owns the Park Hotel in New York City. When Japan attacks Pearl Harbor, Bremmer correctly fears that Germany will soon declare war on the U.S., but his wife is in Germany convalescing after surgery. He sends his lawyer, Carl Becker (Craig Stevens), to Washington to arrange to get her to the U.S., but neither the State Department nor the German Embassy can help.

Bremmer's chauffeur suggests approaching Dr. Woodford (Robert Warwick), who has connections in Germany; but Woodford (a false name) is actually the leader of a Nazi spy ring based at the hotel (the chauffeur and several hotel staff are also members). He threatens Bremmer's wife if Bremmer does not join them, but will get her to the U.S. if he does.

Carl intends to join the military, but when he returns from Washington to his New York office, his old friend Jim Jackson (Charles Lang) visits and tries to persuade Carl he can better serve his country by joining The Department of Counter-Espionage. Next, they talk about Carl's girlfriend Paula Fengler (Faye Emerson), a lounge singer at the Park Hotel. Carl wants to introduce Jim to her, but Jim is very busy while he is in New York. Carl has the idea of getting Jim a room at the Park. Jim happily accepts, since he, along with his friend John Trent (John Ridgely), is part of the team investigating the Park Hotel ring.

But when Jim checks in, the spies recognize him from a photo as a government agent, and demand Bremmer tell who he is. To Bremmer's horror, Woodford promptly orders Jim killed. A bellhop delivers a radio, and when Jim turns it on, a concealed mechanism ignites chemicals to produce poison gas.

Police declare that the death was suicide, but Carl does not believe them. He goes to Washington and applies to join Counter-Espionage. John initially suspects that Carl is part of the spy ring, but after time, decides to trust him. When another agent is killed in New York, Carl and John return there to take up the case.

Carl also takes up again with Paula, telling her about his new job. She says, "I'm glad you're not after me"; he answers romantically, "What makes you think I'm not?" But as soon as she is alone, she calls Woodford to warn him. Woodford secretly listens in as Carl tells Bremmer they now know what the German agent (Woodford) looks like and will soon arrest the whole ring.

Bremmer has a hunting lodge in the Adirondacks, and Woodford orders him to go there. A bellhop delivers the poison radio to Carl and John's room, but they are prepared for the attack and soon capture Woodford and another spy. However, after Carl mentions to Paula what train they are being taken to Washington on, Nazi agents attack it and free them.

A clue left by Bremmer leads the Counter-Espionage agents to the Adirondack lodge, where the spies are using Bremmer's ham radio to contact a German submarine. Carl later learns that Bremmer has also used it, setting up an attack on the sub. After a gun battle in which Bremmer is fatally shot, the government agents use tear gas and all the surviving spies are captured except Woodford.

Woodford returns to the hotel to collect his wife—Paula. Carl arrives; Woodford pulls a gun; Carl kills him with a concealed gun. He then tells Paula he is taking her away on a "little trip"—and arrests her.

== Cast ==
- Craig Stevens as Carl Becker
- Faye Emerson as Paula Fengler
- John Ridgely as Agent John Trent
- Charles Lang as Agent Jim Jackson
- Robert Warwick as Otto Zimmer
- Frank Reicher as Henry Bremmer
- Rex Williams as Hans
- Frank Wilcox as Counter-Espionage Man
- George Meeker as Rudolph Dietz
- Roland Drew as Fred Blosser
- Addison Richards as Chief Agent C.G. Travers
- Cliff Clark as Detective Capt. Jarrett
- Monte Blue as Hugo Mehl

== Reception ==
According to Warner Bros the film earned $235,000 domestically and $96,000 foreign.
