= Murder in the Big House =

1942 film by B. Reeves Eason

- Directed by: B. Reeves Eason
- Screenplay by: Original screenplay by Raymond L. Schrock
- Based on: An idea by Jerry Chodorov
- Starring: Van Johnson; Faye Emerson
- Cinematography: Ted McCord
- Edited by: Terry Morse
- Production company: Warner Bros.—First National Pictures
- Distributed by: Warner Bros. Pictures
- Release date: April 11, 1942
- Running time: 59 minutes
- Country: United States
- Language: English

Murder in the Big House is a black-and-white American crime drama, released by Warner Bros. Pictures in April 1942. Structured as an hour-long second feature, it is directed by the prolific specialist in low-budget action productions, B. Reeves Eason, and stars Van Johnson, who is top-billed above the title, in his first credited film role which represents the entire output of his six-month contract with the studio.

The female lead, Faye Emerson, billed alongside Johnson above the title, played starring and co-starring parts in a small number of B pictures during 1940s and achieved TV stardom at the end of the decade and in the 1950s as a glamorous interviewer and personality during the medium's formative years.

Following Johnson's rise to become the 1945 top box-office attraction as a leading man and Emerson's marriage to the president's son, Elliott Roosevelt, the film was re-released to theaters in late 1945 and early 1946 under the title Born for Trouble.

== Plot ==
Upon receiving a message from death row inmate "Dapper Dan" Malloy (Michael Ames), "Scoop" Conner (George Meeker), top investigative reporter for the Morning News, visits him in prison and learns that before he is to die in the electric chair the following day, Malloy intends to incriminate some top officials complicit in corruption and the murder of the district attorney for which Malloy and his criminal associate "Mile-Away" Gordon (Roland Drew) were sentenced. Trying to prevent the exposure, Malloy's lawyer Bill Burgen (Douglas Wood), himself a member of the corrupt clique, falsely comforts Malloy with the claim that the governor will pardon him after first commuting the sentence to life imprisonment during a radio speech.

New young reporter Bert Bell (Van Johnson) who hopes to convince chief editor Jim "Pop" Ainslee (Joseph Crehan) to give him a chance to cover important events, talks about it with another young reporter, Gladys Wayne (Faye Emerson), who gives him quick-witted supportive advice. Meanwhile, Ainslee contacts the governor and, finding out that the execution will proceed as scheduled, assigns "Scoop" to go to the prison for Malloy's incriminating information. "Scoop", however, has managed to drink himself into a stupor, so Gladys takes the quick decision of handling it herself and has Bert accompany her to the prison. The night of the execution is stormy and reverberates with thunder as Warden Bevins (William Gould) tells the assembled reporters that Malloy has just been punished by a higher power via the bolt of lightning which fatally struck him through the window of his cell.

Malloy's body is displayed for the reporters and the doctor confirms that he died by electricity. Bert secretly photographs Malloy's burns and, back at the office, Ainslee fires and then assigns "Scoop", Bert and Gladys to the case, when she tells him that Malloy was murdered in the electric chair to prevent him from talking. Warden Bevins readily agrees to an investigation, with "Scoop" and Bert being told by everyone, including "Mile-Away" Gordon that Malloy could not have been taken to the chair without anyone's knowledge or notice. "Scoop" and Bert become disheartened and decide to return but, during the drive back, their car becomes the target of bullets and attack by another automobile, causing it to crash. Leaving the seriously injured "Scoop" in the wrecked car, Bert sets out for help. Meanwhile, attorney Burgen has been trying to convince Gordon's wife (Ruth Ford) of the same "pardon" scheme that he had previously used for Malloy, but she is dubious.

Burgen returns to his limousine which is driven by Mike (Bill Phillips), who turns out to be the shooter who tried to kill "Scoop" and Bert. He sees Bert go to Mrs. Gordon's residence and tries to shoot both of them just as Bert finds out from Mrs. Gordon that Molloy was listening to the governor's speech through headphones which may have been electrified. Bert calls Ainslee to inform him that "Scoop" has been taken to a hospital and asks Mrs. Gordon for a chance to visit her husband in prison. On the night of Gordon's execution, he is also given headphones by the warden who arranges for these to be attached to the electric chair's high voltage. Bert exposes the method used to kill Malloy and tells Warden Bevins that he might as well sign a confession exposing the corrupt officials whom the murdered district attorney was in the process of indicting. Bevins points a gun at Bert, but Bert had earlier removed the bullets. A struggle ensues and the older Bevins loses. Chastened and defeated, Bevins names the corruptors, key among whom is lawyer Burgen. The governor decides not to execute Gordon, while Bert and Gladys end the film with a bantering conversation about marriage.

== Cast ==
- Van Johnson as Bert Bell
- Faye Emerson as Gladys Wayne
- George Meeker as "Scoop" Conner
- Frank Wilcox as Randall
- Michael Ames as "Dapper Dan" Malloy
- Roland Drew as "Mile-Away" Gordon
- Ruth Ford as Mrs. Gordon
- Joseph Crehan as Jim Ainslee
- William Gould as Warden John Bevins
- Douglas Wood as Bill Burgen
- John Maxwell as Prison doctor
- Pat McVeigh as Chief electrician
- Dick Rich as Guard
- Fred Kelsey as Keeper
- Bill Phillips as Mike
- Jack Mower as Ramstead
- Creighton Hale as Ritter
- Henry Hall as Chaplain

== Taglines ==
"Murder Behind Bars! WHEN? WHO? HOW? 'Murder IN THE BIG HOUSE' A THRILLER!"
"KILLERS GO MAD as murder strikes death row!"

== Evaluation in film guides ==
Steven H. Scheuer's TV Movie Almanac & Ratings 1958 & 1959 gives Murder in the Big House 2 stars (out of 4), stating that "[B]oth Faye and Van played their first big screen roles in this and it's a wonder they survived. Grade B effort with reporter solving murder for police who have supposedly been trained for the task." The Motion Picture Guide also had a low opinion, assigning 1½ stars (out of 5) and calling it a "[F]airly dull prison film starring Johnson (in his first big role) as cub reporter who, along with veteran newshound Meeker, exposes a murder ring inside the state pen." The write-up also notes that the film was "[R]e-released in 1945 as BORN FOR TROUBLE after Johnson became a star and Emerson married a Roosevelt."
