= The Gorilla Man =

1943 film

- Theatrical release poster
- Directed by: D. Ross Lederman
- Written by: Anthony Coldeway
- Starring: John Loder
- Cinematography: James Van Trees
- Edited by: James Gibbon
- Music by: William Lava
- Production company: Warner Bros. Pictures
- Distributed by: Warner Bros. Pictures
- Release date: January 16, 1943
- Running time: 64 minutes
- Country: United States
- Language: English

The Gorilla Man is a 1943 American drama film directed by D. Ross Lederman. Despite the title and marketing, it is not a horror film, but a World War II espionage thriller.

== Plot ==
Military officer Captain Craig Killian is wounded in the line of duty and taken to a private hospital in England. Killian soon learns the hospital is a front of Nazi operations that wish to damage English home defense efforts.

== Cast ==
- John Loder as Captain Craig Killian
- Ruth Ford as Janet Devon
- Marian Hall as Patricia "Pat" Devon
- Richard Fraser as Lieutenant Walter Sibley
- Paul Cavanagh as Dr. Dorn
- Lumsden Hare as General Randall Devon
- John Abbott as Dr. Ferris
- Mary Field as Nurse Kruger
- Rex Williams as Eric, male nurse
- Joan Winfield as Mrs. Ellen Tanner
- Charles Irwin as Police Inspector Cady
- Peggy Carson as Marie Oliver - the Maid
- Walter Tetley as Sammy
- Creighton Hale as Constable Fletcher
- Frank Mayo as Constable Ryan
