= Lady Gangster =

1942 film by Robert Florey

- Directed by: Robert Florey
- Screenplay by: Anthony Coldeway
- Based on: Women in Prison; 1932 play by Dorothy Mackaye; Carlton Miles
- Produced by: William Jacobs
- Starring: Faye Emerson; Julie Bishop
- Cinematography: Arthur L. Todd
- Edited by: Harold McLernon
- Music by: Various
- Distributed by: Warner Bros. Pictures, Inc.
- Release date: June 6, 1942
- Running time: 62 minutes
- Country: United States
- Language: English

Lady Gangster is a 1942 Warner Bros. B picture crime film directed by Robert Florey, credited as "Florian Roberts". It is based on the play Gangstress, or Women in Prison by Dorothy Mackaye, who in 1928, as #440960, served less than ten months of a one- to three-year sentence in San Quentin State Prison. Lady Gangster is a remake of the pre-Code film, Ladies They Talk About (1933). Jackie Gleason plays a supporting role.

== Plot ==
Dorothy "Dot" Burton (Faye Emerson) is a member of a gang of bank robbers. Using her femininity and a cute dog provided her by her male cohorts, who dognapped him, she is able to enter a bank before opening time, leaving the door open and the bank guard holding her dog, thus enabling a successful robbery. When police interfere with the getaway, she faints and proclaims her innocence, but the police have strong doubts as "her" dog will not come to her and has a different name on his collar from what she calls him. After she confesses to her part in the robbery, she is sent to women's prison, where she makes an enemy of a fellow inmate who informs the governor that Burton knows where the bank's money is, thereby causing Burton to lose her parole. She is devastated by it but more trouble occurs as her old gang is going to kill her childhood sweetheart Ken Philips (Frank Wilcox), so she escapes by stealing the warden's (Virginia Brissac) clothes and getting revenge on her rival inmate (Ruth Ford) before finally rescuing Ken.

== Cast ==
- Faye Emerson as Dorothy Drew Burton
- Julie Bishop as Myrtle Reed
- Frank Wilcox as Kenneth Phillips
- Roland Drew as Carey Wells
- Jackie Gleason as Wilson (as Jackie C. Gleason)
- Ruth Ford as Lucy Fenton
- Virginia Brissac as Mrs. Stoner
- Dorothy Vaughan as Matron Jenkins
- Dorothy Adams as Deaf Annie
- William Hopper as John (as DeWolf Hopper)
- Vera Lewis as Ma Silsby
- Herbert Rawlinson as Lewis Sinton
- Charles C. Wilson as Detective
- Frank Mayo as Walker
- Leah Baird as Matron
- Jack Mower as Police Sergeant

== Soundtrack ==
- "Blues in the Night" (Music by Harold Arlen)
