= Father Is a Prince =

- Directed by: Noel M. Smith
- Written by: Sophie Kerr (play); Anna Steese Richardson
- Screenplay by: Robert E. Kent
- Produced by: William Jacobs
- Starring: Grant Mitchell; Nana Bryant; John Litel
- Cinematography: Ted D. McCord
- Edited by: Frank Magee
- Music by: Rex Dunn
- Distributed by: Warner Bros. Pictures
- Release date: November 18, 1940
- Running time: 57 minutes
- Country: United States
- Language: English

Father Is a Prince is a 1940 comedy film directed by Noel M. Smith, starring Grant Mitchell and Nana Bryant. Father is a Prince is a remake of the 1934 comedy-drama Big Hearted Herbert, itself based on a play by Sophie Kerr.

== Plot ==
John Bower is a demanding father, tight with a dollar and rigid in insisting that his son Junior someday come into the carpet-sweeper business with him. His demure wife Susan puts up with his iron-fisted and tight-fisted ways.

Connie, their daughter, is in love with Gary Lee, a bright young college graduate. They wish to marry but aren't sure how to break the news, so she invites Gary and his parents to dinner. John ruins the evening for everyone with his temper. Susan says she wants a divorce, finally bringing her husband to his senses.

== Cast ==
- Grant Mitchell as John Bower
- Nana Bryant as Susan Bower
- John Litel as Dr. Mark Stone
- George Reeves as Gary Lee
- Jan Clayton as Connie Bower
- Lee Patrick as Tess Haley
- Billy Dawson as Tommy Bower
- Richard Clayton as Junior Bower
- John Ridgely as Salesman
- Frank Wilcox as Income Tax Investigator
- Vera Lewis as Carrie
- Frank Ferguson as Ben Haley
- Pierre Watkin as Mr. Lee
- Mary Currier as Mrs. Lee
- Frank Orth as Drugstore Proprietor
