= Sophie Kerr =

American writer (1880-1965)

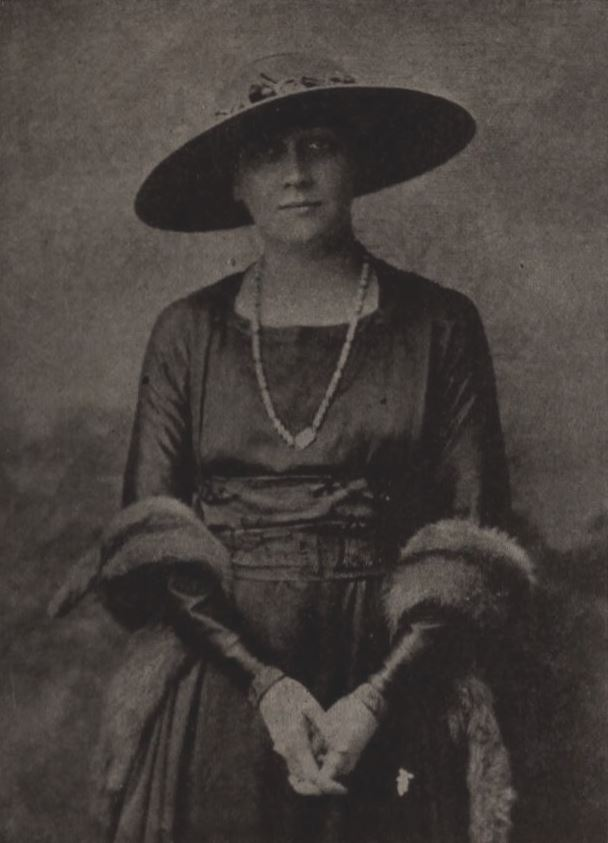
From a 1920 magazine

Sophie Kerr (August 23, 1880 – February 6, 1965) was a prolific writer of the early 20th century whose stories about smart, ambitious women mirrored her own evolution from small-town girl to successful career woman. At a time when few women were financially self-sufficient, Kerr made her way from Maryland’s Eastern Shore to New York City, where she supported herself as a magazine editor and a writer of more than 500 short stories, 23 novels, several poems and a play that ran on Broadway.

Her bequest to Washington College on Maryland’s Eastern Shore in 1965 stipulated that the proceeds of the $578,000 endowment be used to fund an annual literary prize and to support literary events and scholarships at the college. Since 1968, the college in Chestertown has awarded more than $1.4 million in prize money to promising young writers and has enabled Washington College to bring a succession of the nation’s literary luminaries to the small liberal arts college located just 30 miles from where she grew up.

The childhood home of Sophie Kerr, a circa 1860 farmhouse on the corner of 5th and Kerr Avenues in Denton, Maryland, still stands. She specifically describes the house in her short story, “Coming Home for Christmas.”

== Life and career ==
Born in the Caroline County town of Denton, Maryland, in 1880, Sophie Kerr graduated from Denton High School in 1895 and went on to earn a bachelor's degree from Hood College and a master's degree from the University of Vermont. She married John DeLoss Underwood, a civil engineer, in 1904 and divorced him four years later.

In order to support herself, Kerr went into journalism, launching her career in Pittsburgh, Pa. as the women’s page editor at the Chronicle Telegraph and the Pittsburgh Gazette. Moving to New York, she became managing editor of The Woman's Home Companion. and published her fiction in other popular magazines of the day, including Saturday Evening Post, Collier’s Saturday Review of Literature and McCalls. From 1920 until her death in 1965 at age 84, Kerr lived in a brownstone residence at 115 East 38th Street, where she created something of a literary salon for her friends in publishing and theater. In 1942, as part of a celebration of the 50th anniversary of co-education at Washington College, she accepted an honorary degree along with Eleanor Roosevelt.

While her fiction is largely unknown to contemporary readers and her books are long out of print, her stories dealt with class and gender issues at work in the first half of the 20th century. “Kerr wrote stories about plucky heroines, young women who rose to the challenge and went for the gusto. They had big dreams and lots of charm and tons of blond curls. For the most part, they were smart and unassuming and hopelessly, wonderfully, kind, but they had ambition. Even her seemingly vapid heroines had hearts of gold and wills of iron hidden under all their finery.”

In her will, she left the bulk of her estate to Washington College, with the stipulation that half its income would be awarded annually to the senior showing “the most ability and promise for future fulfillment in the field of literary endeavor.” The other half funds scholarships, student publications and a series of visits by renowned writers.

== The Sophie Kerr Prize ==
The Sophie Kerr Prize is awarded each year to a graduating senior at Washington College in Chestertown, Maryland who has demonstrated the best ability and promise for future fulfillment in the field of literary endeavor. The prize is announced at Washington College just prior to the senior commencement ceremony. Valued at $65,768 in 2016, it is the nation's largest undergraduate literary prize. Indeed, it is among the largest in the world, exceeding the Pulitzer Prize, National Book Award, and National Book Critics Circle.

Applicants submit portfolios of what they deem to be their best writing, which may include critical essays, creative nonfiction, poetry, fiction, journalism, stage plays, screenplays, blogging, graphic novels, or other hybrid forms. In a typical year, between 20 and 30 seniors submit portfolios for consideration. In the past, the prize has been awarded for both creative and critical writing. The 2011 Sophie Kerr Prize was awarded to Lisa Jones, an anthropology major who wrote about her life-changing trip to Tanzania. In a break from tradition, Washington College announced the winner at the Poets House in New York City where Sophie Kerr lived for more than 40 years.

The first Sophie Kerr Prize, valued at $9,000, was awarded to a Washington College senior in 1968. The exact value varies according to the return on the endowment. Since its inception, the Sophie Kerr Endowment has provided more than $1.4 million in prize money to promising young writers and has brought literary stars such as Toni Morrison, Katherine Ann Porter, Edward Albee, Natasha Trethewey, and Colum McCann to the Washington College campus.

List of Sophie Kerr Prize Winners
Year	Winner	Year	Winner	Year	Winner
1968	Christina Clark-Rohde	1989	Michele Balze	2010	Hailey Reissman
1969	William Bradford	1990	Harvey Roland Hammer	2011	Lisa Jones
1970	Bill Thompson	1991	Robert Thompson	2012	Katie Manion
1971	James Dissette	1992	Patrick Attenasio	2013	Tim Marcin
1972	Robert Burkholder	1993	Erin Page	2014	Alex Stinton
1973	Mary Yoe	1994	Tanya Angell Allen	2015	Alexander Vidiani
1974	Kevin O’Keefe	1995	Katherine Degentesh	2016	Reilly Cox
1975	William Bowie	1996	Jennifer Ronald	2017	Catalina Righter
1976	Craig Butcher	1997	Brandon Hopkins	2018	Caroline Harvey
1977	Mary Ellen Miller	1998	Ed Geisweidt	2019	Shannon Moran
1978	Arthur Bilodeau	1999	Luke Owens	2020	Mary Sprague
1979	Joanne Ahearn	2000	Christine Lincoln	2021	Justin Thomas Nash
1980	Claire Golding	2001	Stephanie L. Fowler	2022	Teddy L. Friedline
1981	Ellen Beardsley	2002	Sarah Blackman	2023	Eylie Sasajima
1982	Peter Turchi	2003	Laura Walter	2024	Sophie Foster
1983	Julia Stricker	2004	Angela Haley	2025	Sky Abruzzo
1984	Norman Prentiss	2005	Claire Tomkin	2026	Jaya Basu
1985	Dr. Sandra Hiortdahl	2006	Marshall Shord		
1986	Douglas Rose	2007	Liam Daley		
1987	Sue De Pasquale	2008	Emma Sovich		
1988	Dean Hebert	2009	Will Bruce		

== Selected works ==
One Thing Is Certain (1920)

- Love at Large, 1916
- Blue Envelope, (*filmed as The Blue Envelope Mystery)
- The Golden Block, 1918
- The See-Saw, 1919
- Painted Meadows, 1920
- One Thing is Certain, 1922
- Mareea-Maria, 1929
- Tigers Is Only Cats, 1929
- In For a Penny, 1931
- Girl Into Woman, 1932
- Stay Out of My Life, 1934
- Miss J. Looks On, 1935
- There's Only One, 1936
- Fine to Look At, 1937
- Adventure With Women, 1938
- Curtain Going Up, 1940
- The Beautiful Woman, 1941
- Michaels's Girls, 1942
- Jenny Devlin, 1943
- Love Story Incidental, 1946
- Wife's Eye View, 1947
- As Tall As Pride, 1949
- The Man Who Knew the Date, 1951
