= Angela Greene =

Irish actress (1921–1978)

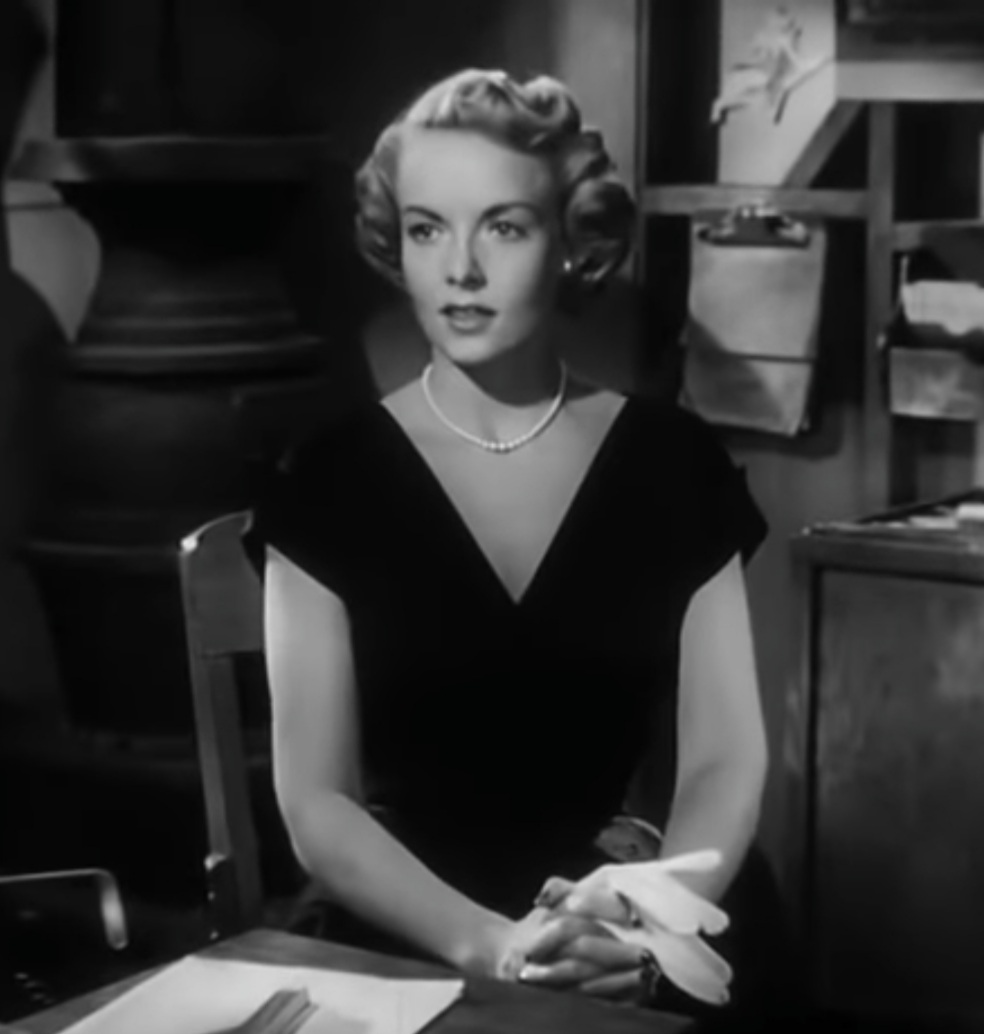
- Greene in At War with the Army (1950)
- Born: Angela Catherine Williams; 24 February 1921; Dublin, Ireland
- Died: 9 February 1978 (aged 56); Los Angeles, California, U.S.
- Occupation: Actress
- Years active: 1944–1976
- Spouse: Stuart Warren Martin (m. 1946; div. 1975)

Angela Katherine Greene (born Angela Catherine Williams; 24 February 1921 (Note: The reference Celebrities in Los Angeles Cemeteries: A Directory gives 4 February 1921 as her date of birth.) – 9 February 1978) was an Irish-American actress.

== Biography ==
Born in Dublin as Angela Catherine Williams, she was the only daughter of Margaret (née Greene) and Joseph Williams. At the age of six, she was adopted by her maternal uncle, Eddie Greene, and moved to Flushing, Queens.

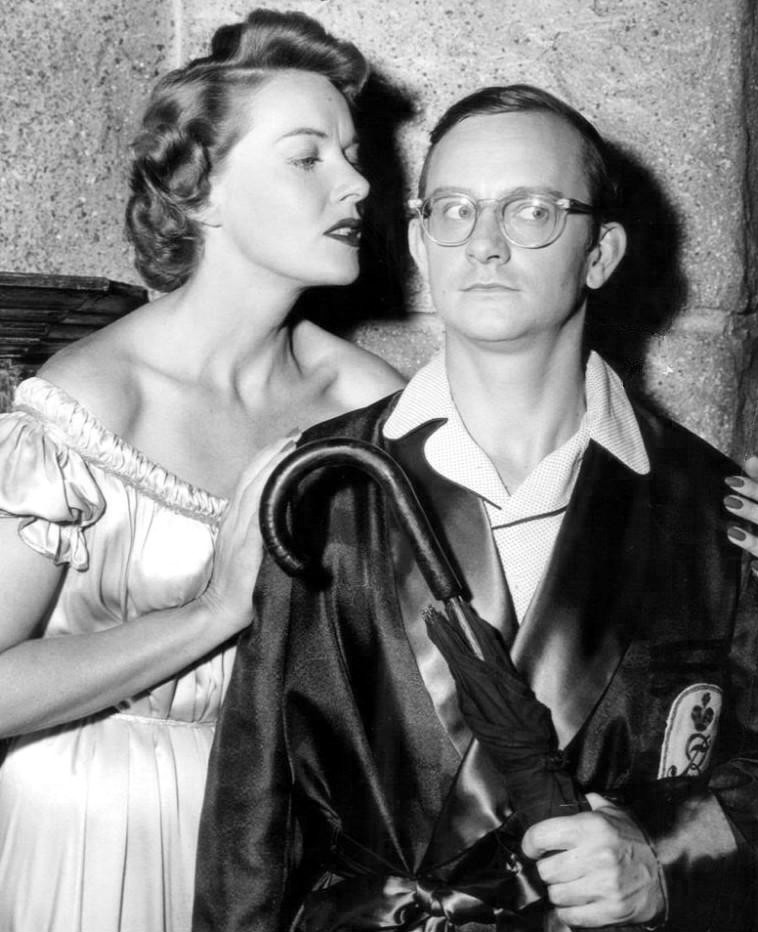
Angela Greene and Wally Cox from TV's The Adventures of Hiram Holliday (1957)

Before becoming an actress, Greene was a model for the John Robert Powers agency.

Her films included Shotgun (1955), The Lady Wants Mink (1953), Hollywood Canteen (1944), The Time, the Place and the Girl (1946), Stallion Road (1947), At War with the Army (1950), A Perilous Journey (1953), The Cosmic Man (1959), and Futureworld (1976). She also appeared on various television shows, such as Alfred Hitchcock Presents, The Alfred Hitchcock Hour, Tales of Wells Fargo,The Donna Reed Show, and Perry Mason.

== Personal life ==
After having dated naval lieutenant John F. Kennedy, she married Stuart Warren Martin on 7 December 1946. They divorced in 1975.

== Death ==
Angela Greene died of a stroke in Los Angeles, shortly before her 57th birthday.

== Partial filmography ==
- Mr. Skeffington (1944) - Hairdresser (uncredited)
- The Very Thought of You (1944) - Nurse (uncredited)
- Hollywood Canteen (1944) - Junior Hostess (uncredited)
- Mildred Pierce (1945) - Party Guest (uncredited)
- Too Young to Know (1945) - Party Guest #6
- Cinderella Jones (1946) - Waitress (uncredited)
- Humoresque (1946) - Tipsy Blonde at Wright's Party (uncredited)
- The Time, the Place and the Girl (1946) - Elaine Winters
- That Way with Women (1947) - Blonde Baseball Fan (uncredited)
- Stallion Road (1947) - Lana Rock
- Love and Learn (1947) - Phyllis McGillicuddy
- Escape Me Never (1947) - Girl (uncredited)
- King of the Bandits (1947) - Alice Mason
- Wallflower (1948) - Miss Walsh (uncredited)
- At War with the Army (1950) - Mrs. Deborah Caldwell
- Jungle Jim in the Forbidden Land (1952) - Dr. Linda Roberts
- The Lady Wants Mink (1953) - Marge (uncredited)
- A Perilous Journey (1953) - Mavis
- Loose in London (1953) - Lady Marcia
- The Royal African Rifles (1953) - Karen Van Stede
- Shotgun (1955) - Aletha
- Affair in Reno (1957) - Gloria Del Monte
- Spoilers of the Forest (1957) - Camille
- Night of the Blood Beast (1958) - Dr. Julie Benson
- Alfred Hitchcock Presents (1959) (Season 5 Episode 9: "Dead Weight") - Mrs. Masterson
- Tales of Wells Fargo (1959) (Season 3 Episode 28: "Toll Road") - Kitty
- Perry Mason (1959) (Season 3 Episode 4: "The Case of the Blushing Pearls") - Thelma Nichols
- The Cosmic Man (1959) - Kathy Grant
- The Alfred Hitchcock Hour (1964) (Season 2 Episode 15: "Night Caller") - Lucy Phillips
- Tickle Me (1965) - Donna
- Batman “The Joker Trumps an Ace“ (1966) - Mrs. Belmont
- The Good Guys and the Bad Guys (1969) - Judy (uncredited)
- Pete 'n' Tillie (1972) - Party Guest (uncredited)]
- Adam-12 (1972) Season 4 Episode 21, "Back-Up 1 L-20" - Sharon
- Banacek (1972) (Season 1, Episode 4 "A Million the Hard Way") - Marcia Leeland
- The Day of the Locust (1975) - Guest #4
- Futureworld (1976) - Mrs. Reed (final film role)
