= The Time, the Place and the Girl (1946 film) =

1946 Technicolor film by David Butler

The Time, The Place And The Girl
- Directed by: David Butler
- Screenplay by: Agnes Christine Johnston; Lynn Starling; Francis Swann
- Story by: Leonard Lee
- Produced by: Alex Gottlieb
- Starring: Dennis Morgan; Jack Carson; Janis Paige; Martha Vickers; S.Z. Sakall; Alan Hale; Angela Greene; Donald Woods
- Cinematography: Arthur Edeson; William V. Skall
- Edited by: Irene Morra
- Music by: Leo F. Forbstein
- Color process: Technicolor
- Production company: Warner Bros. Pictures
- Distributed by: Warner Bros. Pictures
- Release date: December 26, 1946
- Running time: 105 minutes
- Country: United States
- Language: English
- Budget: $1,763,000
- Box office: $3.4 million (US rentals) or $4,831,000

The Time, the Place and the Girl is a 1946 American Technicolor musical comedy film directed by David Butler and starring Dennis Morgan, Jack Carson, Janis Paige and Martha Vickers. The film was produced and distributed by Warner Bros. Pictures. It is unrelated to the 1929 film The Time, the Place and the Girl.

== Plot ==
Steve and Jeff are about to open a nightclub when Martin Drew objects on behalf of conductor Ladislaus Cassel, who lives next door. Drew claims that Cassel objects to the club's music and says that it disturbs his granddaughter, Victoria, an aspiring opera singer.

It turns out that Cassel himself is fine with the club, but Vicki's grandmother Lucia is against it. Cassel also urges Vicki not to marry Andrew, her fiancée, without being certain. After she meets Steve, she is attracted to him. Steve has a girlfriend, Elaine Winters, who is trying to persuade John Braden, a rich Texan, to finance the club. Elaine is upset about Vicki's presence and threatens to marry Braden.

Jeff and his girlfriend, singer Sue Jackson, hope to get a new show off the ground, but both Lucia and Elaine keep interfering. Cassel offers to finance the show provided Vicky can be in it. Lucia is livid until she reluctantly attends the show, at which she is charmed and gives her approval.

== Cast ==
- Dennis Morgan as Steven Ross
- Jack Carson as Jeff Howard
- Janis Paige as Sue Jackson
- Martha Vickers as Victoria Cassel
- S. Z. Sakall as Ladislaus Cassel
- Alan Hale as John Braden
- Angela Greene as Elaine Winters
- Donald Woods as Martin Drew
- Florence Bates as Mme. Lucia Cassel
- Carmen Cavallaro as Himself, Orchestra Leader
- Condos Brothers as Themselves
- Chandra Kaly and His Dancers as Themselves
- Brandon Hurst as Simpkins, the Cassel's Butler
- Lillian Yarbo as Jeannie, Elaine's maid
- Mimi Aguglia as Inez, Victoria's Maid
- Florence Lake as Kathy
- Monte Blue as Stage Manager
- Bert Roach as Process Server
- Chester Clute as Jeff's Apartment Manager
- Lynn Baggett as Nurse

== Soundtrack ==
- "A Rainy Night in Rio"'

Music by Arthur Schwartz
Lyrics by Leo Robin
Performed by Jack Carson, Dennis Morgan, Janis Page and Martha Vickers (dubbed by Sally Sweetland)

- "Oh, But I Do"

Music by Arthur Schwartz
Lyrics by Leo Robin
Sung by Dennis Morgan

- "A Gal in Calico" (Nominated for an Academy Award for Best Original Song of 1948)

Music by Arthur Schwartz
Lyrics by Leo Robin
Performed by Dennis Morgan, Jack Carson, Martha Vickers (dubbed by Sally Sweetland) and chorus

- "Through a Thousand Dreams"

Music by Arthur Schwartz
Lyrics by Leo Robin

- "A Solid Citizen of the Solid South"

Music by Arthur Schwartz
Lyrics by Leo Robin
Performed by Jack Carson and the Condos Brothers

- "I Happened to Walk Down First Street"

Music by Arthur Schwartz
Lyrics by Leo Robin

== Box office ==
According to Warner Bros. records, it was the studio's most financially successful film of 1946–47, earning $3,461,000 domestically and $1,370,000 in foreign territories.
