= Marjorie Hoshelle =

American actress

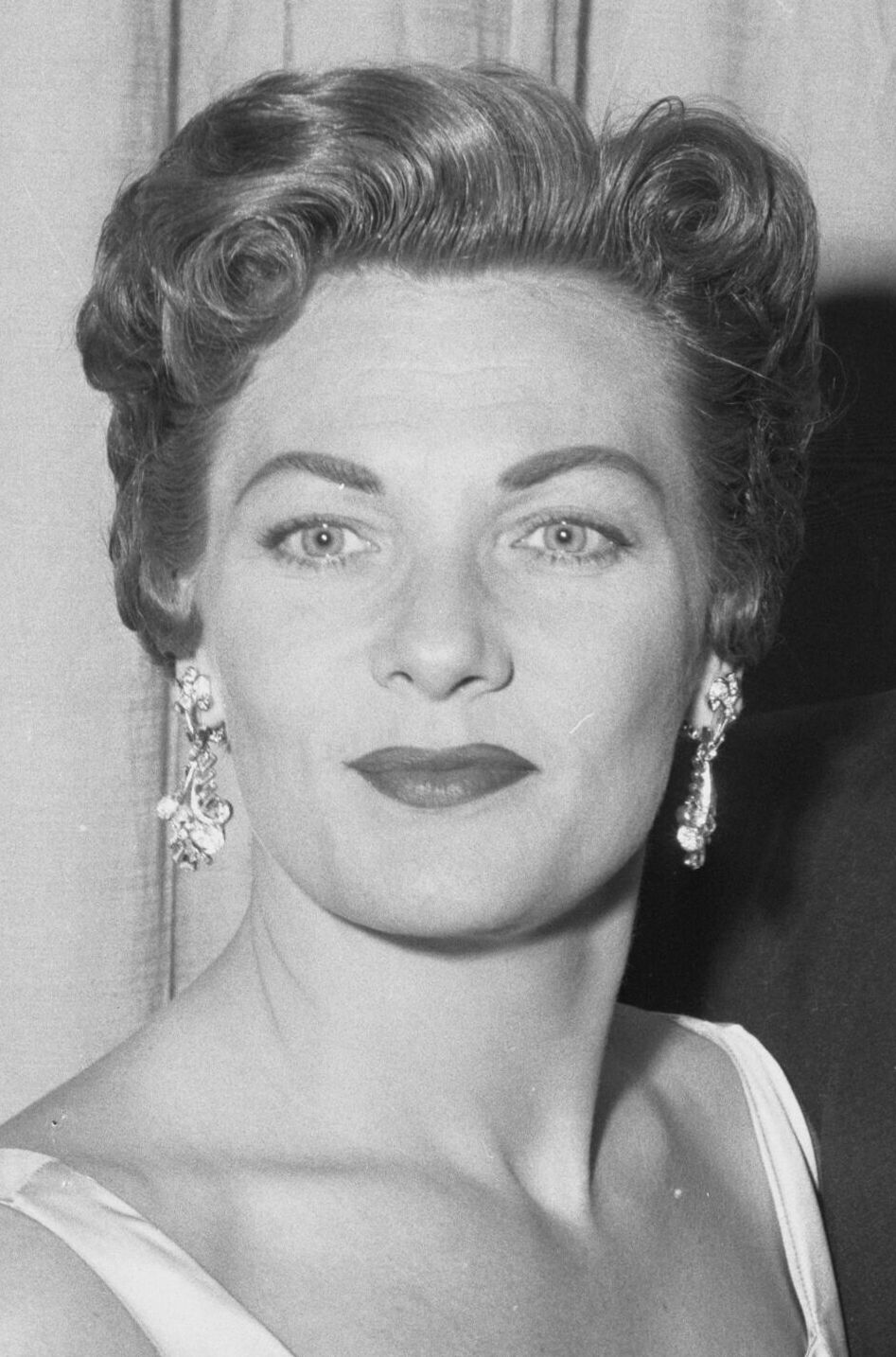
- Hoshelle at the 27th Academy Awards in 1955
- Born: Marjorie Leah Hoshell; January 7, 1918; Chicago, Illinois, U.S.
- Died: April 5, 1989 (aged 71); Los Angeles, California, U.S.
- Education: Art Institute of Chicago; UCLA
- Occupation: Actress
- Spouse: Jeff Chandler (m. 1946; div. 1959)
- Children: 2

Marjorie Leah Hoshell (January 7, 1918 – April 5, 1989) was an American actress.

Born in Chicago, Hoshelle was the daughter of Norman and Leah Hoshell. She graduated from the Art Institute of Chicago and UCLA.

Portraying Juliet in a stage production of Romeo and Juliet, Hoshelle caught the attention of a talent scout. The resulting screen tests resulted in a Warner Bros. contract. She appeared in the films Princess O'Rourke, Find the Blackmailer, Old Acquaintance, Shine On, Harvest Moon, Make Your Own Bed, The Mask of Dimitrios, The Strange Mr. Gregory, Black Market Babies, The Red Dragon, My Reputation, One More Tomorrow, Behind the Mask, Blonde for a Day, Cloak and Dagger, Bungalow 13, Ladies of the Chorus, Riding High, I Can Get It for You Wholesale and Dangerous Crossing.

In 1946, Hoshelle married actor Jeff Chandler. They had two daughters, and divorced in 1959.

Following her film career, Hoshelle taught acting and directed productions at Santa Monica City College and Los Angeles Harbor College.

== Filmography ==
Year	Title	Role	Notes
1943	Air Force	Nurse	Uncredited
1943	Thank Your Lucky Stars	Maid	Uncredited
1943	Princess O'Rourke	Miss Jeffries	Uncredited
1943	Find the Blackmailer	Pandora Pines	
1943	Old Acquaintance	Margaret Kemp - Kit's Fanclub Leader	Uncredited
1944	Shine On, Harvest Moon	Fowler's Secretary	Uncredited
1944	Make Your Own Bed	Elsa Wehmer	
1944	The Mask of Dimitrios	Anna Bulic	
1945	Conflict	Lodge Telephone Operator	Uncredited
1945	The Strange Mr. Gregory	Sheila Edwards	
1945	Black Market Babies	Donna Corbett	
1945	The Red Dragon	Countess Irena	
1946	My Reputation	Phyllis	Uncredited
1946	One More Tomorrow	Illa Baronova	
1946	Behind the Mask	Mae Bishop	
1946	Blonde for a Day	Helen Porter	
1946	Cloak and Dagger	Ann Dawson	
1947	Lured	Robert's Rejected Girlfriend	Uncredited
1948	Bungalow 13	Alice Ashley	
1948	Ladies of the Chorus	Bubbles LaRue	Uncredited
1950	Riding High	Mathilda Early	
1950	The Next Voice You Hear...	Sweetie, B-Girl in Bar	Uncredited
1951	I Can Get It for You Wholesale	Louise	Uncredited
1953	Dangerous Crossing	Kay Prentiss	(final film role)
