= Make Your Own Bed =

1944 film by Peter Godfrey

- Theatrical release poster
- Directed by: Peter Godfrey
- Screenplay by: Francis Swann; Edmund Joseph; Richard Weil
- Based on: On the Hiring Line; 1919 play by Harvey J. O'Higgins and Harriet Ford
- Produced by: Alex Gottlieb
- Starring: Jack Carson; Jane Wyman; Irene Manning; Alan Hale, Sr. George Tobias; Robert Shayne
- Cinematography: Robert Burks
- Edited by: Clarence Kolster
- Music by: Heinz Roemheld
- Production company: Warner Bros. Pictures
- Distributed by: Warner Bros. Pictures
- Release date: June 10, 1944
- Running time: 82 minutes
- Country: United States
- Language: English

Make Your Own Bed is a 1944 American comedy film directed by Peter Godfrey and written by Francis Swann, Edmund Joseph and Richard Weil. The film stars Jack Carson, Jane Wyman, Irene Manning, Alan Hale, Sr., George Tobias and Robert Shayne. The film was released by Warner Bros. on June 10, 1944.

== Plot ==
Wealthy and eccentric Walter Whirtle (Alan Hale) and his wife Vivian (Irene Manning) can't seem to keep servants at their country estate. Whirtle, having insulted a policeman, is jailed, and meets inept (and newly fired) private detective Jerry Curtis (Jack Carson), who had arrested the district attorney. Claiming that he is being stalked by Nazi spies, Walter hires Jerry to pose as his butler and Jerry's long-suffering fiancée Susan Courtney (Jane Wyman) to pose as his cook and investigate. He also hires a cast of German radio actors to portray the spies and string Jerry and Susan along. Other elements of intrigue develop when Walter suspects Vivian of carrying on an affair, and Susan sees Jerry landed in a series of compromising situations.

== Cast ==
- Jack Carson as Jerry Curtis
- Jane Wyman as Susan Courtney
- Irene Manning as Vivian Whirtle
- Alan Hale, Sr. as Walter Whirtle
- George Tobias as Boris Fenilise
- Robert Shayne as Mike Knight
- Tala Birell as Marie Gruber
- Ricardo Cortez as Wilson
- Marjorie Hoshelle as Miss Elsa Wehmer
- Kurt Katch as Herr von Ritter
