= Two Wise Maids =

1937 film by Phil Rosen

- Directed by: Phil Rosen
- Screenplay by: Samuel Ornitz
- Story by: Endre Bohem
- Produced by: Nat Levine
- Starring: Alison Skipworth; Polly Moran; Irene Manning; Donald Cook; Jackie Searl; Lila Lee
- Cinematography: Ernest Miller
- Edited by: Ernest J. Nims
- Music by: Karl Hajos
- Production company: Republic Pictures
- Distributed by: Republic Pictures
- Release date: February 15, 1937
- Running time: 70 minutes
- Country: United States
- Language: English

Two Wise Maids is a 1937 American drama film directed by Phil Rosen, written by Samuel Ornitz, and starring Alison Skipworth, Polly Moran, Irene Manning, Donald Cook, Jackie Searl, and Lila Lee. It was released on February 15, 1937, by Republic Pictures.

== Cast ==
- Alison Skipworth as Agatha Stanton / Old Lady Ironsides
- Polly Moran as Prudence Matthews
- Irene Manning as Ellen Southard
- Donald Cook as Bruce Arnold
- Jackie Searl as Elliot 'Wet Mouth' Braxton
- Lila Lee as Ethel Harriman
- Luis Alberni as Guili
- Maxie Rosenbloom as Max Handler
- Marcia Mae Jones as Geraldine 'Jerry' Karns
- Harry Burns as Nicky Zackorackus
- Clarence Wilson as Twitchell
- Selmer Jackson as Dr. MacIntyre
- John Hamilton as Grover Wentworth
- Teresa Maxwell-Conover as Mrs. Braxton
- Raymond Brown as Philip Pierpont
- James C. Morton as Sergeant Abbot
- Stanley Blystone as Jim Butch
- Robert McClung as Harmonica Player
