= Richard Fraser (actor) =

Scottish actor (1913–1972)

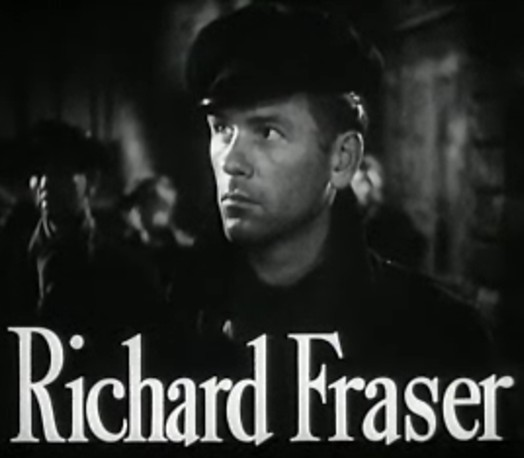
- Fraser in a trailer for The Picture of Dorian Gray (1945)
- Born: Richard Mackie Simpson; 15 March 1913; Edinburgh, Scotland
- Died: 19 January 1972 (aged 58); London, England
- Other names: Richard Mackie
- Education: University of Cambridge; Royal Academy of Dramatic Art
- Occupation: Actor
- Years active: 1941–1952
- Spouses: Louise Christine Sheldon (m. 1938; div. 1944) Ann Gillis (m. 1952; div. 1970) Edna Martin (m. 1971; died 1972)

Richard Fraser (born Richard Mackie Simpson; 15 March 1913 – 19 January 1972) was a Scottish film, television, and stage actor. He is perhaps best known for his role in the 1945 film The Picture of Dorian Gray.

== Early life ==
After graduating from Sedbergh School as Richard Mackie Simpson, Richard's mother divorced and his name was shortened to Richard Mackie. After attending Cambridge University, Richard Mackie studied acting at the Royal Academy of Dramatic Art. Having spent time as a London stage actor, Richard emigrated to the US and in New York married Louise Christine Sheldon, the couple then moved to Hollywood before the Second World War. Discovering that there was already a Richard Mackie acting in the US he adopted the stage name Richard Fraser. He then signed a contract with 20th Century Fox and appeared in numerous films.

== Career ==
His American film career reached its peak with his performance as James Vane, the vengeful brother of Sibyl Vane in the film The Picture of Dorian Gray. Richard retired from acting in 1949, returning to Britain in 1961 with his then-wife, US actress Ann Gillis, spending his most of his last decade working for the BBC in export sales.

== Selected filmography ==
- The Ghost Goes West (1935) as Son of MacLaggen (uncredited)
- Man Hunt (1941) as Navigator (uncredited)
- A Yank in the R.A.F. (1941) as Thorndyke
- How Green Was My Valley (1941) as Davy Morgan
- Joan of Paris (1942) as Geoffrey
- Eagle Squadron (1942) as Lt. Jefferys
- Busses Roar (1942) as Dick Remick
- Desperate Journey (1942) as Squadron Leader Clark
- The Gorilla Man (1943) as Lieutenant Walter Sibley
- Truck Busters (1943) as Limey
- Edge of Darkness (1943) as Pastor Aalesen
- Thumbs Up (1943) as Douglas Heath
- Holy Matrimony (1943) as John Leek (uncredited)
- Ladies Courageous (1944) as Col. Andy Brennan
- The Picture of Dorian Gray (1945) as James Vane
- The Fatal Witness (1945) as Inspector William 'Bill' Trent
- Scotland Yard Investigator (1945) as Inspector Cartwright
- Shadow of Terror (1945) as Jim, aka Howard Norton
- White Pongo (1945) as Geoffrey Bishop
- The Tiger Woman (1945) as Stephen Mason
- The Undercover Woman (1946) as Gregory Vixon
- Bedlam (1946) as Hannay
- Blonde for a Day (1946) as Dillingham 'Dilly' Smith
- Cloak and Dagger (1946) as British Submarine Skipper (uncredited)
- The Private Affairs of Bel Ami (1947) as Philippe de Cantel
- Blackmail (1947) as Antoine le Blanc
- The Lone Wolf in London (1947) as David Woolerton
- Raw Deal (1948) as Fields
- Rogues' Regiment (1948) as Rycroft
- The Cobra Strikes (1948) as Michael Kent
- Alaska Patrol (1949) as Operative Farrell (as Dick Fraser)
- The Red Danube (1949) as Transport Pilot (uncredited)
