= That Way with Women =

1947 film starring Sidney Greenstreet, directed by Frederick de Cordova

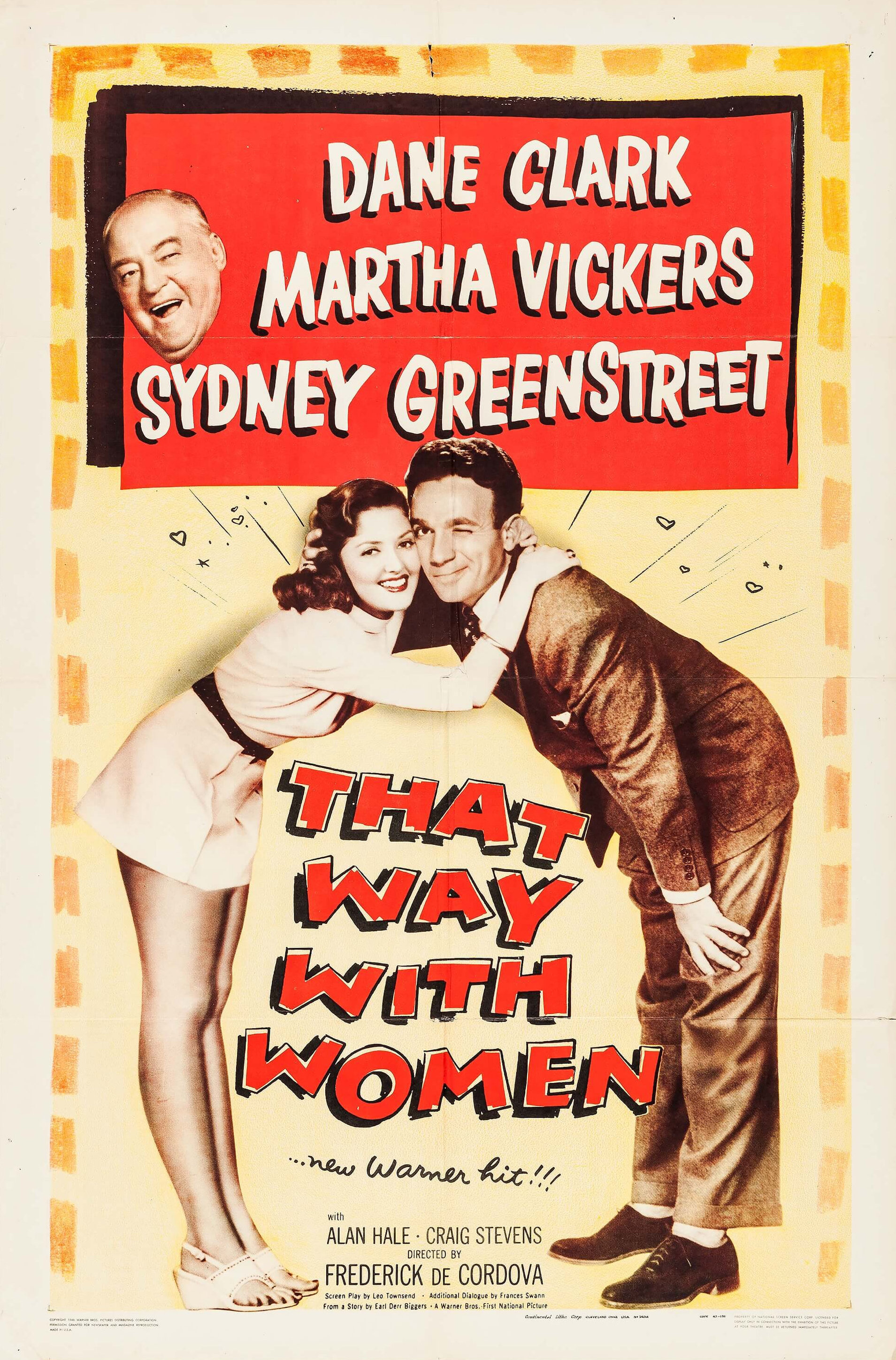
- Theatrical release poster
- Directed by: Frederick de Cordova
- Screenplay by: Leo Townsend; Francis Swann
- Based on: Idle Hands; 1921 story in The Saturday Evening Post by Earl Derr Biggers
- Produced by: Charles Hoffman
- Starring: Dane Clark; Martha Vickers; Sydney Greenstreet
- Cinematography: Ted D. McCord
- Edited by: Folmar Blangsted
- Music by: Friedrich Hollaender
- Production company: Warner Bros. Pictures
- Distributed by: Warner Bros. Pictures
- Release date: March 29, 1947
- Running time: 84 minutes
- Country: United States
- Language: English

That Way with Women is a 1947 American comedy film directed by Frederick de Cordova, written by Leo Townsend and Francis Swann, starring Dane Clark, Martha Vickers, and Sydney Greenstreet, and featuring Alan Hale, Sr., and Craig Stevens. It was released by Warner Bros. Pictures on March 29, 1947.

The screenplay was adapted from the Saturday Evening Post story "Idle Hands", which was previously the basis for the films The Ruling Passion (1922) and The Millionaire (1931), both of which starred George Arliss in the role assumed by Greenstreet.

== Plot ==
James P. Alden, an automobile tycoon who's being pushed to retire, assumes the identity of family gardener Herman Brinker and, hoping to prove he's still vital, buys a corner gas station with Greg Wilson, who doesn't know his true identity. This complicates matter when he falls for Alden's daughter Marcia. Along the way, the two men also grapple with shakedown artists and numerous false arrests due to mistaken identity.

== Cast ==
- Dane Clark as Greg Wilson
- Martha Vickers as Marcia Alden
- Sydney Greenstreet as James P. Alden
- Alan Hale, Sr. as Herman Brinker
- Craig Stevens as Carter Andrews
- Barbara Brown as Minerva Alden
- Don McGuire as Slade
- John Ridgely as Sam
- Richard Erdman as Eddie
- Herbert Anderson as Melvyn Pfeiffer
- Howard Freeman as Dr. Harvey
- Ian Wolfe as L.B. Crandall
- Olaf Hytten as Davis
- Joe Devlin as Police Desk Sergeant
- Clifton Young as Irate Baseball Fan
- Charles Arnt as Harry Miller
- Suzi Crandall as First Party Girl
- Janet Murdoch as Alice Green
- Creighton Hale as Briggs
- Philo McCullough as Hawkins
- Jack Mower as Deacon
- Jane Harker as Angela
- Monte Blue as MacPherson

== Production ==
The film utilizes the tune Take Me Out to the Ball Game in its score.
