= The Strange Mr. Gregory =

1945 film directed by Phil Rosen

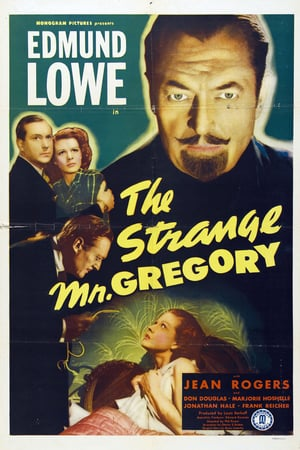
- Poster for the film
- Directed by: Phil Rosen
- Screenplay by: Charles S. Belden
- Story by: Myles Connolly
- Produced by: Louis Berkoff
- Starring: Edmund Lowe; Jean Rogers; Don Douglas
- Cinematography: Ira Morgan
- Edited by: Seth Larsen
- Music by: Edward J. Kay
- Production company: Monogram Pictures
- Release date: November 14, 1945 (US)
- Running time: 63 minutes
- Country: United States
- Language: English

The Strange Mr. Gregory is a 1945 American horror film, directed by Phil Rosen. It stars Edmund Lowe, Jean Rogers, and Don Douglas, and was released on November 14, 1945.

== Plot ==
Mr. Gregory (Edmund Lowe) is a famous but reclusive magician. Through secret study over several years, he has developed certain occult powers. Under the right circumstances, he can influence the thoughts of others. He also can put his body into a kind of suspended animation to give the appearance that he is dead.

Amateur magician John Randall (Don Douglas) is a great admirer of Mr. Gregory and makes an effort to meet and befriend him. Mr. Gregory, however, quickly becomes obsessed with Randall's beautiful wife, Ellen (Jean Rogers). He concocts an elaborate scheme to fake his own murder, frame Randall for the crime and win Ellen for himself. At first his plot seems to work perfectly, but he arouses the suspicions of some people he had expected to fool.

== Cast ==
- Edmund Lowe as Mr. Gregory aka Lane Talbot
- Jean Rogers as Ellen Randall
- Don Douglas as John Randall
- Marjorie Hoshelle as Sheila Edwards
- Jonathan Hale as Blair
- Frank Reicher as Riker
- Robert Emmett Keane as District attorney
- Frank Mayo as Inspector Hoskins
- Fred Kelsey as Detective Lefert
- Anita Turner as the maid
