= King of the Bandits =

1947 film directed by Christy Cabanne

- Directed by: Christy Cabanne
- Screenplay by: Bennett R. Cohen
- Story by: Christy Cabanne
- Produced by: Jeffrey Bernerd
- Starring: Gilbert Roland; Angela Greene; Chris-Pin Martin
- Cinematography: William A. Sickner
- Edited by: Roy Livingston
- Music by: Edward J. Kay
- Production company: Monogram Productions
- Release date: November 8, 1947 (US)
- Running time: 66 minutes
- Country: United States
- Language: English

King of the Bandits is a 1947 American Western film, directed by Christy Cabanne. It stars Gilbert Roland, Angela Greene, and Chris-Pin Martin, and was released on November 8, 1947.

== Cast ==
- Gilbert Roland as the Cisco Kid, aka Chico Villa
- Angela Greene as Alice Mason
- Chris-Pin Martin as Pancho
- Anthony Warde as Smoke Kirby
- Laura Treadwell as Mrs. Mason
- William Bakewell as Capt. Mason
- Rory Mallinson as Burl
- Pat Goldin as Pedro Gomez
- Cathy Carter as Connie
- Boyd Irwin as Col. Wayne
