= Irene Manning =

American actress and singer

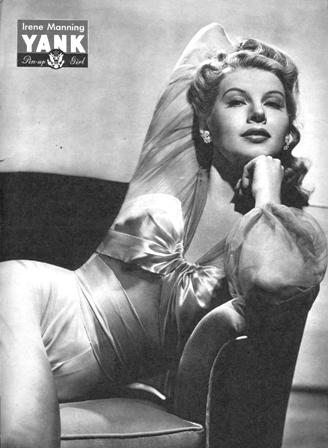
- Born: Inez Harvuot; July 17, 1912; Cincinnati, Ohio, U.S.
- Died: May 28, 2004 (aged 91); San Carlos, California, U.S.
- Other name: Hope Manning
- Occupations: Actress, singer
- Years active: 1936–1955
- Spouse(s): Keith Kolhoff (1944 - ?); Maxwell W. Hunter II (1964-2001, his death)

Irene Manning (born Inez Harvuot, July 17, 1912 – May 28, 2004) was an American actress and singer.

== Biography ==
Manning was born as Inez Harvuot on July 17, 1912 in Cincinnati, Ohio, one of five siblings. Both of her parents were singers. Her family loved to go on outdoor picnics where the featured activity was group singing. This family environment helped Irene to develop a keen interest in singing at a very early age. Her sisters later complained that little Irene would sing in her sleep, keeping them awake. Manning trained as an opera singer at the Eastman School of Music in Rochester and performed with that city's Civic Music Association in 1935.

During World War II, Manning performed with a four-woman USO show in England and the United States and recorded with Glenn Miller and his Army Air Force Band. Miller was involved in making swing records to be broadcast into Nazi Germany as part of the American Broadcasting System in Europe. Because she had been a light opera star prior to World War II and was fluent in singing in German, she was asked to sing some American pop tunes which had been translated into German vocals. Her sides were some of the last records made by Glenn Miller, prior to his being lost on an ill-fated flight to Paris over the English Channel in December 1944.

She was credited as Hope Manning in her first films, as she broke in with the Republic Studios system in 1936. Her first film placed her as the lead actress in a western, The Old Corral (1938), opposite Gene Autry.

By the early 1940s, Irene was employed in the Warner Bros. studio system as a contract actress and singer. She is probably best remembered as diva Fay Templeton in Yankee Doodle Dandy (1942), opposite James Cagney, where she both sang and played the piano. She starred with Humphrey Bogart in The Big Shot (1942), and with Dennis Morgan in both The Desert Song (1943) and Shine On, Harvest Moon (1944).

Her contract was picked up by Metro-Goldwyn-Mayer (MGM) to place her singing skills as a threat to Jeanette MacDonald, who was giving MGM fits with her difficult demands. In private, Manning claimed that she was a better singer. The problem between MacDonald and MGM subsided, and Manning's contract was dropped without any appearances in an MGM film. In all, Irene Manning made a dozen films.

On Broadway, Manning performed in The Day Before Spring (1945) and Susanna, Don't You Cry (1939). She also appeared in The Dubarry, Castle in the Air and Serenade in London. She remained in England and appeared on her own BBC TV show, An American in England, until 1951, when she returned to the United States for television and nightclub work. Eventually she retired to teach acting and voice.

== Personal life and death ==
Manning was married four times. In 1944, she married publisher Keith Kolhoff. Her last marriage was to Maxwell W. Hunter II, who designed missiles during the Cold War. They were wed for 37 years until he died in 2001.

Manning died on May 28, 2004, from congestive heart failure at her home in San Carlos, California, at the age of 91. Upon her death, she was cremated with her ashes scattered at sea.

== Filmography ==
Year	Title	Role	Notes
1936	The Old Corral	Eleanor Spencer, aka Jane Edwards	
1937	Two Wise Maids	Ellen Southard	
1937	Michael O'Halloran	Leslie	
1942	Yankee Doodle Dandy	Fay Templeton	
1942	Spy Ship	Pam Mitchell	
1942	The Big Shot	Lorna Fleming	
1943	The Desert Song	Margot	
1944	Shine On, Harvest Moon	Blanche Mallory	
1944	Make Your Own Bed	Vivian Whirtle	
1944	The Doughgirls	Mrs. Sylvia Cadman	
1944	Hollywood Canteen	Irene Manning	
1945	Escape in the Desert	Lora Tedder	
1945	I Live in Grosvenor Square	Herself - U.S.O. Singer	
