= Thumbs Up (film) =

1943 American musical drama film directed by Joseph Santley

- Directed by: Joseph Santley
- Written by: Frank Gill Jr. Ray Golden; Henry K. Moritz; Paul Gerard Smith
- Produced by: Albert J. Cohen
- Starring: Brenda Joyce; Richard Fraser; Elsa Lanchester; Arthur Margetson
- Cinematography: Ernest Miller
- Edited by: Thomas Richards
- Music by: Walter Scharf; Marlin Skiles; Sammy Cahn; Jule Styne
- Production company: Republic Pictures
- Distributed by: Republic Pictures
- Release date: July 5, 1943
- Running time: 67 minutes
- Country: United States
- Language: English

Thumbs Up is a 1943 American musical drama film producted by Albert J. Cohen for Republic Pictures and directed by Joseph Santley. The film stars Brenda Joyce, Richard Fraser and Elsa Lanchester. The screenplay was written by Frank Gill Jr. based on a story idea by Ray Golden and Henry K. Moritz. Musical direction was by Walter Scharf, words and music by Sammy Cahn and Jule Styne respectively. The film was released on July 5, 1943.

For a publicity stunt to boost her career, an American nightclub singer volunteers for a stint in a British munitions factory. She is so impressed by the spirit of her fellow workers that she decides to stay on.

== Plot ==
Louise Latimer (Brenda Joyce) is working at the American Club in London as a singer, hoping for her next big break with the help of Bert Lawrence (Arthur Margetson), but Bert has been unable to help her along as Bert's associate E.E. Cartwright (André Charlot) has other ideas, he wants to use various talents from ammunitions and aircraft plants from England for his next show. While Louise is performing, Douglas Heath (Richard Fraser) is drawing attention to himself by performing tricks with some coins on his arm, which Louise takes exception to, but Douglas ignores her displeasure and sits at her table just as Louise's hopeful fiancé, Bert joins them. Later, Emma Finch (Elsa Lanchester) visits the American Club with her friend Basil (Wee Willie Davis) and runs into her old friend Bert and sits at their table. She tells Bert and Louise that she'll be working at the Minton aircraft factory for the duration of the war. Bert inadvertently mentions that Minton is one of the locations that Cartwright will be drawing talent from. Louise decides to volunteer for the factory work, and with the help of Bert, she will be discovered by Cartwright.

Louise and Emma begin their new stints as aircraft riveters while being entertained during their meal breaks by various talents, including American singer Gertrude Niesen and the Hot Shots. Emma meets her new beau Sam Keats (J. Pat O'Malley) and Louise discovers that Douglas is also working there as an aircraft safety inspector. Douglas chides her for not wearing her hair tied back with a kerchief and after loosely tying it back, the kerchief is caught in a drill press and she is chided by Douglas for the safety hazard which increases her dislike for him.

Louise and Emma now have to share their apartment with a third person, Janie Brooke (Queenie Leonard), who doesn't quite fit in. Later when the three women go to the local fair with their friends from the factory, Janie continually tries to steal Sam away from Emma without much success. While there, Louise and Douglas fall in love.

The Next day the audition for a patriotic review is posted on the bulletin board at the factory, and on the day of the try outs Emma and Sam perform a song and dance together. After Louise auditions, she is chosen to take part in the patriotic review. Bert walks Louise home and asks her to marry him, something he's done many times before, and she tactfully turns him down. Douglas arrives outside Louise's apartment just after she goes inside, Bert who is now bitter, reveals to him that Louise only took the factory job with the intention of auditioning for the review and furthering her career and not for patriotic reasons. Janie overhears the whole conversation and the next day she tells Emma and the others of Louise's ambitiousness and they shun her.

Later that day Louise is assigned to a wheel function test, Sam warns Douglas to wrap the controller's cord around the ladder to prevent a safety accident, but Douglas forgets and puts the controller on the ladder step without wrapping it. Another worker bumps the ladder and knocks the controller off onto the floor as Louise is walking by, she steps on it by accident which causes injury to a fellow worker. Janie accuses Louise of causing the accident and she takes the blame, covering for Douglas. Later Louise is cleared of the blame by the injured worker, and Douglas verifies that he was at fault.

Louise resigns at the factory and returns to the American Club to work there, Bert attempts to confirm her role in the Patriotic Review but she declines to take part. Douglas goes to the club with Emma and Sam, and Douglas and Louise reunite. Louise goes back to working at the airplane factory for the remainder of the war.

== Cast ==
- Brenda Joyce as Louise Latimer
- Richard Fraser as Douglas Heath
- Elsa Lanchester as Emma Finch
- Arthur Margetson as Bert Lawrence
- J. Pat O'Malley as Sam Keats
- Queenie Leonard as Janie Brooke
- Molly Lamont as Welfare Supervisor
- Gertrude Niesen as Herself
- George Byron as Foreman
- Charles Irwin as Ray Irwin - Orchestra Leader
- André Charlot as E.E. Cartwright
- Wee Willie Davis as Basil
- The Hot Shots
- Anita Sharp-Bolster as Mrs. Smithers, the landlady

== Songs ==
- From Here On In - words by Sammy Cahn, music by Jule Styne, performed by Brenda Joyce
- Who Are the British - words by Sammy Cahn, music by Jule Styne, performed by Gertrude Niesen and cast
- Thumbs Up - performed by cast
- Love Is a Corny Thing - words by Sammy Cahn, music by Jule Styne, performed by Brenda Joyce
- Love Is a Balmy Thing - words by Sammy Cahn, music by Jule Styne, performed by Elsa Lancaster and J. Pat O'Malley

== Reception ==
The United States Office of War Information strongly approved of the film which they felt showed a more realistic, democratic version of modern Britain than most other Hollywood films of the period.
