= Bungalow 13 =

1948 film by Edward L. Cahn

- Film poster
- Directed by: Edward L. Cahn
- Produced by: Sam Baerwitz
- Starring: Tom Conway
- Cinematography: Jackson Rose
- Edited by: Louis Sackin
- Music by: Edward J. Kay
- Distributed by: 20th Century Fox
- Release date: November 17, 1948 (Los Angeles)
- Running time: 65 minutes
- Country: United States
- Language: English

Bungalow 13 is a partially lost 1948 American crime drama film starring Tom Conway and Margaret Hamilton. Less than a third of the film is available for viewing, and the whereabouts of the rest of the surviving footage, if any, is unknown.

== Plot ==
Private detective Christopher Adams chases a precious antique jade lion through the Mexican cafes, auto courts, and the seamy side of Los Angeles.

Adams has a meeting scheduled with a mystery man named Gomez, who is killed. Alice Ashley, a woman he encounters in a bar, then picks Adams' pocket, stealing his wallet. When he tracks her down, he finds Alice stabbed to death. Nosy neighbor Theresa Appleby happens upon the scene after Adams arrives.

A police lieutenant, Sam Wilson, immediately suspects Adams of murdering the woman. Investigating together, they conclude that a bartender, Patrick Macy, once engaged to Adams, is behind the killings. Mrs. Appleby also helps a grateful Adams in solving the case.

== Cast ==
- Tom Conway as Christopher Adams
- Margaret Hamilton as Mrs. Theresa Appleby
- Richard Cromwell as Patrick Macy
- James Flavin as Lt. Sam Wilson
- Marjorie Hoshelle as Alice Ashley
- Frank Cady as Gus Barton
- Eddie Acuff as José Fernando
- Jody Gilbert as Mrs. Martha Barton
- Juan Varro as Pedro Gomez
- Lyle Latell as Willie
- Mildred Coles as Hibiscus
- John Davidson as Mr. Eden
- Cy Kendall as Police Officer (unbilled)
- Robert Malcolm as Sergeant Cox (unbilled)
- Anne Nagel as Henrietta (unbilled)
