= Truck Busters =

1943 film by B. Reeves Eason

- Theatrical release poster
- Directed by: B. Reeves Eason
- Written by: Robert E. Kent; Raymond L. Schrock
- Produced by: William Jacobs
- Starring: Richard Travis; Virginia Christine; Charles Lang; Ruth Ford; Richard Fraser; Tod Andrews; Frank Wilcox
- Cinematography: Harry Neumann
- Edited by: Clarence Kolster
- Music by: Howard Jackson
- Production company: Warner Bros. Pictures
- Distributed by: Warner Bros. Pictures
- Release date: February 6, 1943
- Running time: 58 minutes
- Country: United States
- Language: English
- Budget: $102,000
- Box office: $236,000

Truck Busters is a 1943 American drama film directed by B. Reeves Eason, written by Robert E. Kent and Raymond L. Schrock, and starring Richard Travis, Virginia Christine, Charles Lang, Ruth Ford, Richard Fraser, Tod Andrews and Frank Wilcox. It was released by Warner Bros. Pictures on February 6, 1943.

== Cast ==
- Richard Travis as Casey Dorgan
- Virginia Christine as Eadie Watkins
- Charles Lang as Jimmy Dorgan
- Ruth Ford as Pearl
- Richard Fraser as Limey
- Tod Andrews as Dave Todd
- Frank Wilcox as Police Capt. Gear
- Don Costello as Anthony 'Tony' Bonetti
- Rex Williams as Al Wilson
- Bill Crago as Joe Moore
- Monte Blue as Scrappy O'Brien
- Bill Kennedy as Tim Shaughnessy
- William B. Davidson as Stephen S. Gray
- George Humbert as Andy Panopolos
- Peggy Diggins as Babe
- John Harmon as Maxie
- John Maxwell as District Attorney Danton
- Glen Cavender as Mack
- Frank Ferguson as George Havelock
- Robert Middlemass as Landis
- Edward Keane as Elliott
- Jean Ames as Waitress

== Box office ==
According to Warner Bros records the film earned $223,000 domestically and $13,000 foreign.
