= The Fatal Witness =

1945 film by Lesley Selander

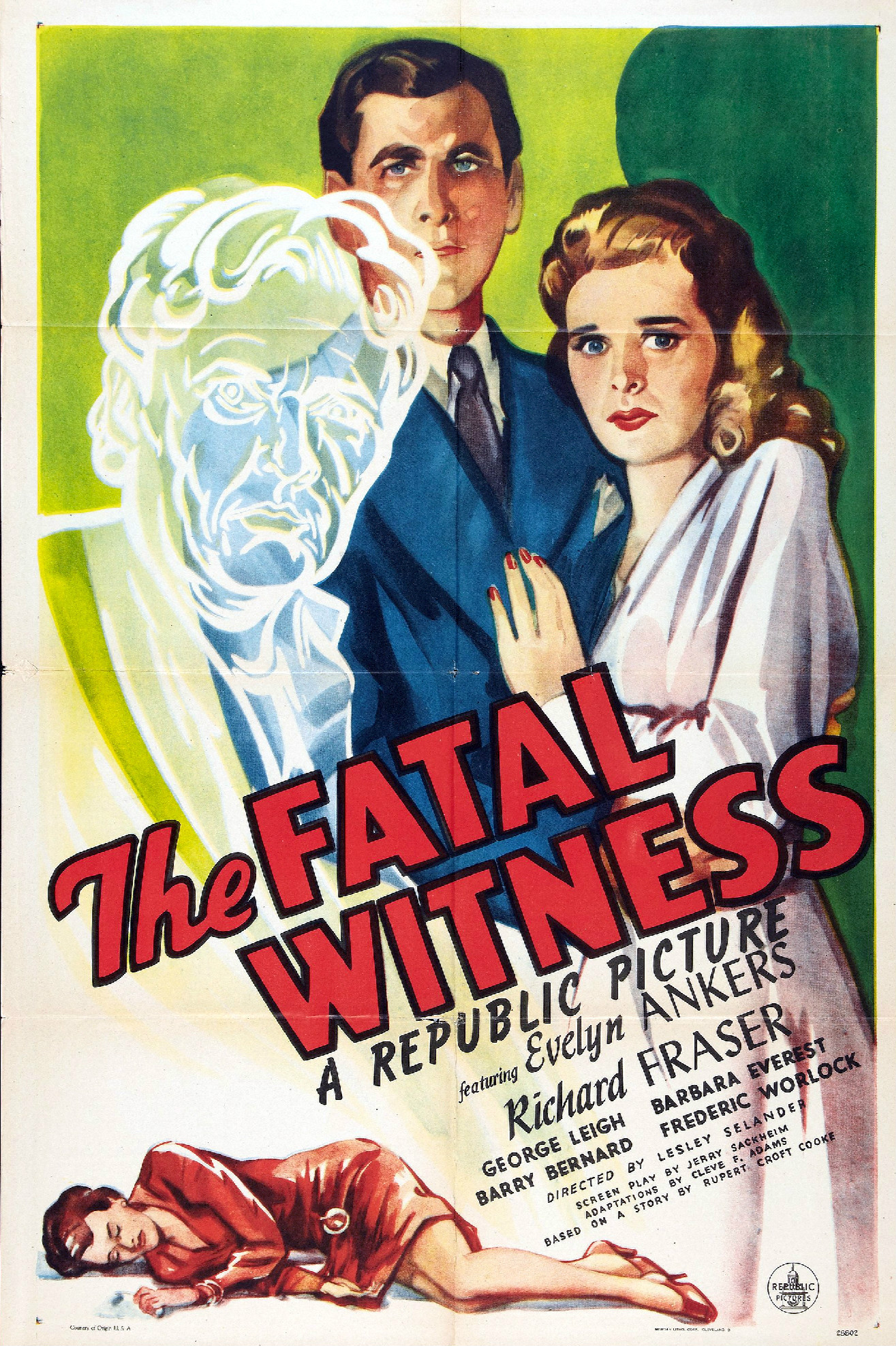
- Theatrical release poster
- Directed by: Lesley Selander
- Screenplay by: Jerry Sackheim; Cleve F. Adams
- Story by: Rupert Croft-Cooke
- Produced by: Armand Schaefer
- Starring: Evelyn Ankers; Richard Fraser; George Leigh; Barbara Everest; Barry Bernard; Frederick Worlock
- Cinematography: Bud Thackery
- Edited by: Ralph Dixon
- Production company: Republic Pictures
- Distributed by: Republic Pictures
- Release date: September 15, 1945
- Running time: 65 minutes
- Country: United States
- Language: English

The Fatal Witness is a 1945 American mystery film directed by Lesley Selander and written by Jerry Sackheim and Cleve F. Adams. The film stars Evelyn Ankers, Richard Fraser, George Leigh, Barbara Everest, Barry Bernard and Frederick Worlock. The film was released on September 15, 1945, by Republic Pictures.

== Plot ==
The wealthy Lady Elizabeth Ferguson threatens to disinherit nephew John Bedford after accusing him of stealing from her. Bedford goes to a pub, where he becomes inebriated, creates a scene and is taken to jail.

The dead body of Lady Elizabeth is discovered by her ward, Priscilla Ames, who phones Scotland Yard. It doesn't take long for Inspector Trent to consider Bedford a suspect, but having been in a cell, Bedford's alibi is iron-clad.

A jail guard, Scoggins, was bribed to release Bedford for one hour on the night of the murder. When he demands more money, Bedford kills him, first establishing yet another alibi. A suspicious Trent manages to persuade Priscilla to try an elaborate ruse, hiring actress Vera Cavanaugh to pretend to be Lady Elizabeth's ghost. As everyone else in the room pretends to see nothing, a terrified Bedford confesses.

== Cast ==
- Evelyn Ankers as Priscilla Ames
- Richard Fraser as Inspector William 'Bill' Trent
- George Leigh as John Bedford
- Barbara Everest as Lady Elizabeth Ferguson / Vera Cavanaugh
- Barry Bernard as Scoggins
- Frederick Worlock as Sir Humphrey Mong
- Virginia Farmer as Martha
- Colin Campbell as Sir Malcolm Hewitt
- Crauford Kent as Jepson
- Peggy Jackson as Gracie Hallet
- Elaine Lange as Tillie
- Harry Cording as Gus
- Boyd Irwin as Randall
