= The Cobra Strikes =

1948 film directed by Charles Reisner

- Theatrical release poster
- Directed by: Charles Reisner
- Written by: Eugene Conrad
- Produced by: David I. Stephenson; Benjamin Stoloff
- Starring: Sheila Ryan; Richard Fraser; Leslie Brooks
- Cinematography: Guy Roe
- Edited by: Louis Sackin
- Music by: Albert Glasser
- Production company: Ben Stoloff Productions
- Distributed by: Eagle-Lion Films
- Release date: April 24, 1948
- Running time: 62 minutes
- Country: United States
- Language: English

The Cobra Strikes is a 1948 American mystery film directed by Charles Reisner and starring Sheila Ryan, Richard Fraser, and Leslie Brooks. In the UK, it was released as Crime Without Clues.

== Plot ==
Dr. Damon Cameron is shot while leaving his laboratory in route to a state medical banquet where he planned to reveal his new invention. At the time his twin brother Ted is keeping an appointment with Victor Devereaux and Franz Lang, colleagues in his importing business, at a local club. Devereaux angerly warns Ted to stay away from his wife. A brain surgeon believes he might be able to save Damon, but there will be severe memory loss. Police captain Monihan and Sergeant Harris have informed Cameron's daughter Dale and brother Ted of the shooting. With the police captain's permission, Mike Kent, a newspaper writer and crime investigator, searches Damon's laboratory, but finds nothing. Mike meets with one of Ted's business partners, Hyder Ali from India, at the Safari Club's steam room. They both become suspects when Victor Devereaux dies hidden by the steam.

Olga Kaminoff arrives at Devereaux's funeral claiming to be the love of his life, and when she asks to see the body, they find the coffin empty. When the body is found in a bay the autopsy reveals the cause of death was poison. Monihan arrests Lang, as Kent suspects a connection between Damon's invention and Devereaux's murder. Monihan arranges a meeting with all the suspects, Dale, and Ted. While watching a home movie of a hunting trip in India, Dale notices that an ivory elephant of value has disappeared from the mantel. Lang is killed by the same poison that killed Devereaux, cobra venom. Ali is then found dead with the ivory elephant nearby. When Damon recovers enough to reveal that his invention is an insulin hypo-spray, he also mentions that only his brother knew of it. Mike figures that Ted is the criminal, but Ted then takes Dale hostage with threats to poison her as well. Mike and the cops outwit Ted and capture him; then Olga is revealed to be mystery story writer. After the murders are solved Mike and Dale realize that they appear to have a bit of romantic chemistry.

== Cast ==
- Sheila Ryan as Dale Cameron
- Richard Fraser as Michael Kent
- Leslie Brooks as Olga Kaminoff
- Herbert Heyes as Theodore Cameron / Dr. Damon Cameron
- James Seay as Police Capt. Monihan
- Richard Loo as Hyder Ali
- Lyle Latell as Police Sgt. Harris
- Pat Flaherty as Atlas Kilroy
- Philip Ahn as Kasim—Houseboy
- Fred Nurney as Franz Lang
- Leslie Denison as Morton—New Butler
- George Sorel as Victor Devereaux
- Selmer Jackson as Dr. Keating
- Dean Riesner as Detective Brody
- Howard Negley as Safari Club Doorman
- Milton Parsons as Mr. Weems, Mortician
- George Chandler as Joe Gates - Night Watchman
- Virginia Farmer as Mrs. Gause - Housekeeper
- Victor Cutler as Policeman at Conclusion
- James Logan as Bartender

== Bibliography ==
- Thomas S. Hischak. The Encyclopedia of Film Composers. Rowman & Littlefield, 2015.
