= The Cosmic Man =

1959 film

- Theatrical release poster
- Directed by: Herbert S. Greene
- Written by: Arthur C. Pierce
- Produced by: Harry Marsh; Robert A. Terry
- Starring: Bruce Bennett; John Carradine; Angela Greene; Scotty Morrow
- Cinematography: John F. Warren
- Edited by: Helene Turner; Richard C. Currier (Uncredited)
- Music by: Paul Sawtell; Bert Shefter
- Production company: Futura Productions
- Distributed by: Allied Artists
- Release date: February 17, 1959
- Running time: 72 minutes.
- Country: USA
- Language: English

The Cosmic Man is a 1959 independently made black-and-white science fiction film, directed by Herbert S. Greene and produced by Robert A. Terry. The film stars John Carradine, Bruce Bennett and Angela Greene. The narrative concerns an extraterrestrial being who, just as the space age is beginning, comes to Earth bearing a message of interplanetary peace and understanding, only to clash with the military. The Cosmic Man was made by Futura Productions Inc. and was distributed in the US by Allied Artists and in the UK by Associated British-Pathé.

== Plot ==
The United States Air Force (USAF) tracks an unidentified flying object (UFO) as it passes over the village of Oak Ridge, California at a speed of 180,000 mph (292,500 km/h). The UFO, a white sphere, comes to rest in Stone Canyon outside of Oak Ridge, floating approximately 6 feet (1.8 metres) above the ground. Both USAF Col. Matthews and Dr. Karl Sorenson, an astrophysist at the nearby Pacific Institute of Technology (PIT), are called to the scene.

Kathy Grant, a widow whose fighter pilot husband died in the Korean War, runs a tourist lodge near the canyon and also arrives. With her is her young son Ken, who uses a wheelchair due to an unnamed terminal disease. Ken looks up to Sorenson as a hero, not Matthews.

That night the sphere emits a beam of light from which emerges a dark, translucent humanoid figure. The figure goes to Sorenson's lab at PIT, where it solves a problem with a "proton chamber" that Sorenson and Dr. Richie have been unable to solve. This alerts both men to the fact that they are dealing with an extraterrestrial of much greater intelligence than they. Matthews, however, sees the alien as dangerous and therefore something – or someone – to be captured. He orders the sphere taken to the airbase. But even with heavy equipment at their disposal, the USAF crew is unable to move the sphere, even though it is attached to nothing.

An oddly-dressed stranger – wearing thick eyeglasses, a fedora and an anorak – arrives at the lodge and requests a room. Kathy finds him peculiar but lets him stay after he implies that he is a scientist who knows Sorenson. Kathy assumes that he's Dr. Steinholz (Hal Torey), whom USAF Gen. Knowland has called in to help with the sphere.

Sorenson performs an experiment in which he shoots an electrical charge into the sphere. It creates a huge "sonic blast." Sorenson says that with greater power the sphere could create a sonic blast large enough to "wipe a city off the face of the earth." This worries Matthews, who rhetorically asks Sorenson what would happen if a similar sphere landed in Russia and the Russians figured out its secrets before the US; Sorenson admits that that would be very bad indeed.

That night at the lodge, the Cosmic Man appears in translucent humanoid form before the scientists and military personnel. He says that Sorenson and other scientists are the "hope for the world" now that Earthlings are about to start space exploration. But he declares that humans must adopt a new philosophy and learn to live with others unlike themselves before they can become successful members of interplanetary society. He says that he will leave in the morning. Knowland demands to know more about his plans and, when the Cosmic Man walks away without answering, the airmen open fire on him. It has no effect.

Later, Kathy hears voices coming from Ken's room. She finds Ken playing chess with the odd scientist who has been staying at the lodge. She doesn't know that he is the Cosmic Man disguised as a human. He politely thanks Ken for teaching him to play chess, agrees that they've had fun, then leaves. But he later returns and secretly takes Ken with him.

By this time, Steinholz has aimed powerful electromagnets at the sphere. The Cosmic Man appears with Ken in his arms, lays him gently on the ground and tells the assembled USAF personnel and scientists to stay well away from the sphere as he leaves. Steinholz fires the electromagnets and the Cosmic Man falls to the ground, apparently dead. But then Ken suddenly stands up and walks to Kathy - no longer paralyzed, he has been cured by the Cosmic Man. Everyone smiles at the sight.

The sphere emits another beam of light, absorbing the body of the Cosmic Man, and flies away. With tears in his eyes, Ken says "Goodbye, Cosmic Man." Sorenson replies confidently "He'll be back" and he, Kathy and Ken rejoin the others.

== Cast ==
- John Carradine as the Cosmic Man
- Bruce Bennett as Dr. Karl Sorenson
- Angela Greene as Kathy Grant
- Paul Langton as Col. Matthews
- Scotty Morrow as Ken Grant
- Lyn Osborn as Sgt. Gray
- Walter Maslow as Dr. 'Rich' Richie
- Herbert Lytton as Gen. Knowland
- Ken Clayton as Master Sergeant
- Alan Wells as Sergeant
- Harry Fleer as Bill
- John Erman as radar operator
- Dwight Brooks as Major
- Hal Torey as Dr. Steinholtz

== Production ==
The Cosmic Man was "shot quickly, primarily on a hotel lobby set, and in Griffith Park" in Los Angeles, where the Griffith Observatory was used as the Pacific Institute of Technology. Although filmed in 1958, the movie was not released until 1959. The special effect of showing the Cosmic Man as a translucent black figure was done by having Carradine wear "a peculiar-looking set of white tights and a hood to match; he was shot against a black background, then printed in negative into the scene." Herbert S. Greene directed only one other film, Outlaw Queen (1957), and The Cosmic Man was the only film made by Futura Productions Inc.

For its release in the UK, the British Board of Film Censors (BBFC) reviewed the film in May 1959 and granted it a U-certificate, which allowed it to be shown to audiences of all ages. No cuts were required of the film. As such, the UK version runs the same length of time, just over 72 minutes, as the version shown in the US.

== Distribution ==
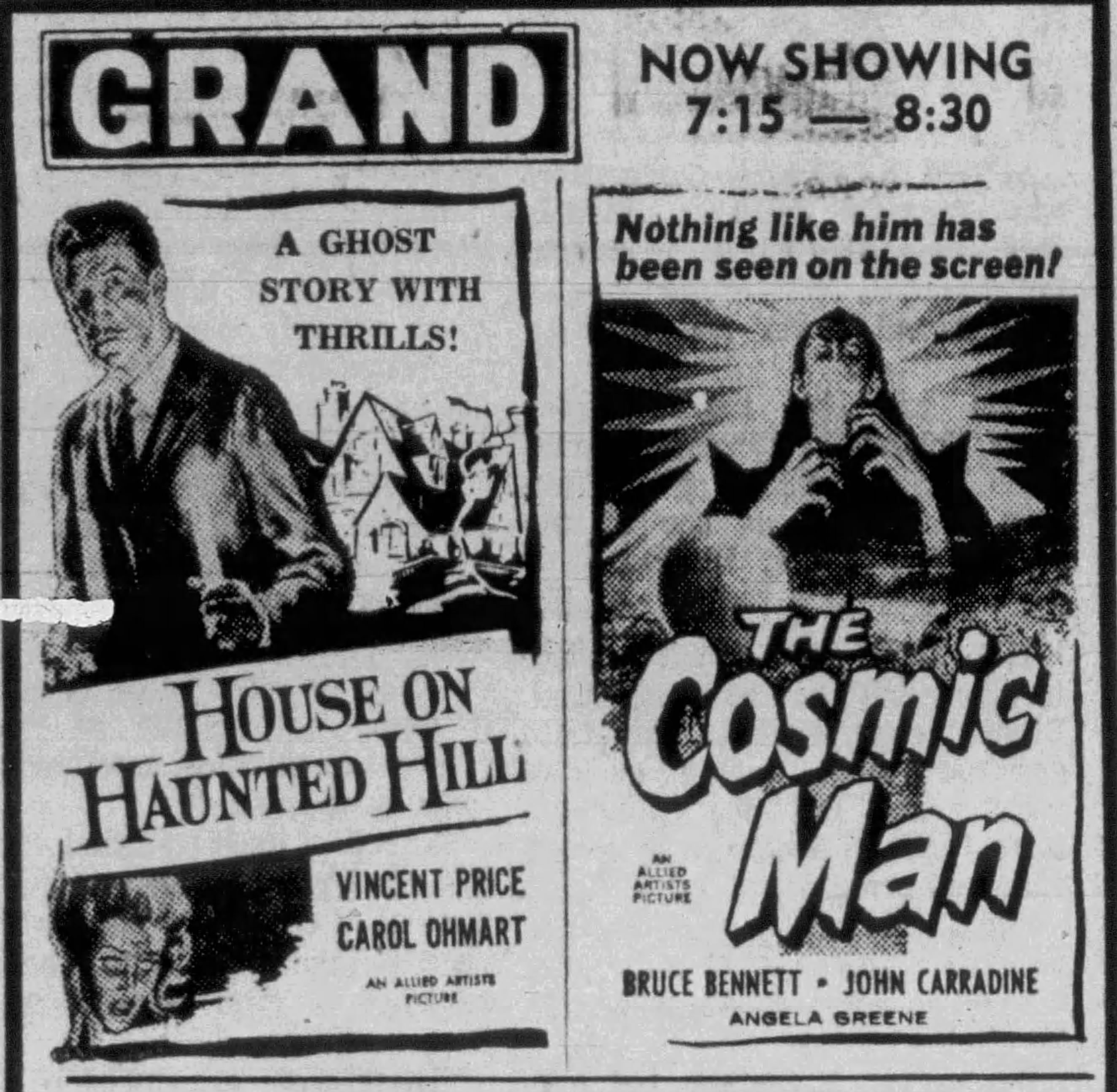
Advertisement from 1959 for The Cosmic Man and co-feature, House on Haunted Hill

The movie was distributed in the US by Allied Artists and in the UK by Associated British-Pathé.

According to American science fiction film historian Bill Warren, The Cosmic Man played on a double-bill with House on Haunted Hill (1959) in February 1959 "in Los Angeles at least." A contemporary but undated newspaper advertisement for the Division Street Theatre in Portland, Oregon shows The Cosmic Man paired with Undersea Girl (1959). And the film was playing at the Hayward Theatre in Hayward, California on 18 August 1959, according to an advertisement in that day's Hayward Daily Review newspaper.

The Cosmic Man was released on DVD in the UK by First Class Films in 1996, with the same U-cert that the BBFC had granted the theatrical film, although the DVD's running time of approximately 69 minutes is three minutes shorter than that of the movie.

In the US, Image Entertainment released the film three times: as a single DVD in 2000; as a two-disc set with Stranger from Venus (1954) in 2003; and in a three-disc set with Stranger from Venus and The Fying Saucer (1950).

== Reception ==
BoxOffice magazine reported mixed ratings from the publications it normally surveyed for information about films in its weekly "Review Digest" feature. BoxOffice itself, The Film Daily and Parent's Magazine all called The Cosmic Man "good." The Hollywood Reporter rated the film as "fair" while Harrison's Reports and Variety called it "poor."

The anonymous review in Boxoffice supports the magazine's "good" rating. It says that "This is just what the doctor ordered as concerns those censors of film fare who have been squawking long and hard because they think there is too much horror" in contemporary science fiction and horror movies. The review describes The Cosmic Man as "a science-fiction yarn with a minimum of spine chilling" and calls the film's story "imaginative but believable" and its cast "sincere."

Variety used the headline "Dull science fictioner" for its review and wrote: "The Cosmic Man apparently was designed to be a thoughtful science-fiction thriller," writes reviewer Powe, "but thought, as in drama, is no substitute for action, and certainly not when the thoughts are as banal as they are in this one." Powe continues, saying that "the screenplay (...) wastes considerable time on a diversionary interest, a handicapped child, that is particularly sticky."

Warren also thinks poorly of the film. He calls it "drab" and "talky," and writes that much of the science discussed in the film "fails to explain a great deal, but never mind, it's (...) designed to intrigue 12-year-olds, the audience for whom the film was intended." He also notes that "the only added idea is curing the boy, so sentimental and contrived as to be almost repellent, quite the opposite of the intended effect." On the other hand, Warren praises "the movies's only real virtue: the sight of this white sphere just hanging there (...) is oddly eerie. The supports were well hidden, and the object never seems to move." He says, as well, that "the cinematography is moderately effective, moodily using shadows to good advantage" and that the director "shows modest talent, the scenes are well-staged, with a variety of angles and good use of the limited sets."

British film critic Phil Hardy is more positive about The Cosmic Man. He calls it an "engaging, low-budget oddity" that "explores the idea of a benevolent alien trying to set Earth to rights" á la The Day the Earth Stood Still (1951). Unlike the other reviewers, Hardy is favourable about the Cosmic Man restoring young Ken's ability to walk and says that "The film's optimistic ending has a certain naïve power."

TVGuide.com falls into the middle of the user ratings, giving the film 2 of 4 stars. The review calls it an "interesting low budget science-fiction film inspired by The Day the Earth Stood Still and the general fear of nuclear war in the 1950s." The Cosmic Man "could have been a classic with a larger budget and more thought but is an intriguing failure as is."

== See also ==
- List of American films of 1959
