= The Old Corral =

1936 film

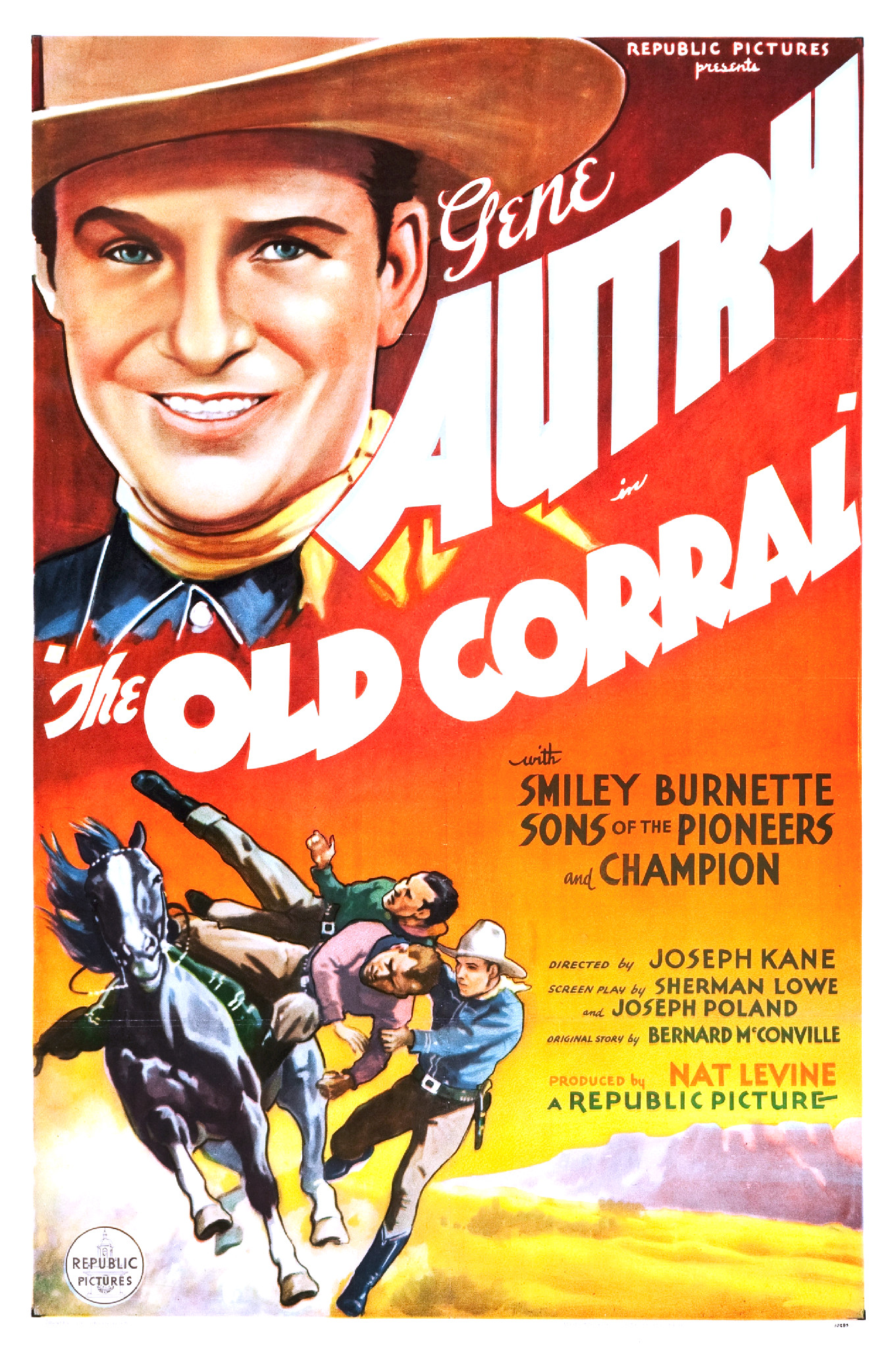
- Theatrical release poster
- Directed by: Joseph Kane
- Screenplay by: Sherman L. Lowe; Joseph F. Poland
- Story by: Bernard McConville
- Produced by: Nat Levine
- Starring: Gene Autry; Smiley Burnette; Irene Manning; Lon Chaney Jr.; Roy Rogers
- Cinematography: Edgar Lyons
- Edited by: Lester Orlebeck
- Production company: Republic Pictures
- Distributed by: Republic Pictures
- Release date: December 21, 1936 (U.S.)
- Running time: 54 minutes
- Country: United States
- Language: English

The Old Corral is a 1936 American Western film directed by Joseph Kane and starring Gene Autry, Smiley Burnette, and Irene Manning. Based on a story by Bernard McConville, the film is about a sheriff of a small western town who sings his way into a relationship with a singer from a Chicago nightclub who earlier witnessed a murder. The supporting cast features Lon Chaney Jr. and Roy Rogers.

The film features an unshaven Roy Rogers in his second Gene Autry film, then identified under his actual birth name, Leonard Slye, as the leader of the O'Keefe Brothers, played by the singing Sons of the Pioneers, a troupe of western singers trying to break into radio. Rogers' first appearance, in which he and his group rob a busload of people to garner publicity, ends with Autry threatening to arrest Rogers as soon as he's back on a horse. Sixteen months after The Old Corral was released, in the wake of a walkout from the studio by Gene Autry, newly renamed "Roy Rogers" starred in his first feature film, Under Western Stars. The Old Corral would remain Autry's and Rogers' only film together however Roy Rogers appeared in the Gene Autry film The Big Show (released 16 November 1936) with the Sons of the Pioneers as one of several musical acts appearing the film with no interaction with Autry.

== Plot ==
After witnessing nightclub owner Tony Pearl murdered by gangster Mike Scarlotti (John Bradford), blues singer Eleanor Spenser (Irene Manning) flees Chicago and heads West on a bus. Soon her picture appears in newspapers across the country. The bus makes a stop in Turquoise City, New Mexico, where Martin Simms (Cornelius Keefe), the crooked owner of the Blue Moon saloon, befriends Eleanor. After seeing her picture in the newspapers, Simms, who is hoping to collect a reward from Scarlotti, sends the gangster a telegram revealing Eleanor's whereabouts.

The bus is held up by the O'Keefe Brothers (Sons of the Pioneers), a local aspiring singing troupe seeking publicity. Sheriff Gene Autry (Gene Autry) arrests all of the O'Keefe Brothers, except Buck and Tom who escape. Meanwhile, Simms sees Eleanor preparing to leave town and is able to convince her to stay. Gene arrives on the scene and recognizes Eleanor from the bus. She introduces herself as Jane Edwards, the new entertainer at his Blue Moon saloon. Sometime later Gene sees Eleanor's picture in a newspaper and goes to the Blue Moon saloon to protect her against Simms. Gene and Eleanor end up singing a song together.

Gene discovers Buck and Tom in their hideout at the old corral and hires the O'Keefes to perform at the town plaza for Turquoise City's celebration of its new dam. During the concert, Scarlotti arrives and threatens Simms, trying to force him to reveal Eleanor's whereabouts. Deputy Frog (Smiley Burnette) is able to warn Eleanor about Scarlotti's arrival and takes her to the old corral to hide. Scarlotti follows them to the old corral. Gene recruits the O'Keefe Brothers as his posse, who stampede cattle, forcing Scarlotti's men to scatter. Gene arrests Scarlotti, and Eleanor names him as the murderer of Tony Pearl. Gene also arrests Simms for intimidating a witness. Gene then releases the O'Keefe Brothers, sings another song, and kisses Eleanor.

== Cast ==
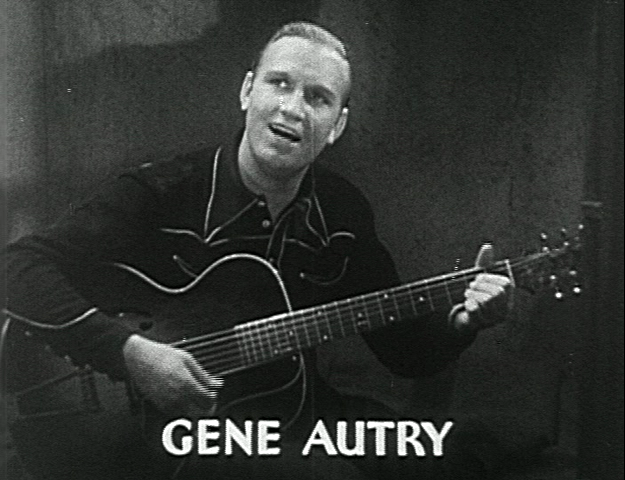
Gene Autry, 1936

- Gene Autry as Sheriff Gene Autry
- Smiley Burnette as Deputy Frog
- Irene Manning as Eleanor Spencer, aka Jane Edwards
- Sons of the Pioneers as O'Keefe Brothers
- Champion as Champ, Gene's Horse
- Cornelius Keefe as Martin Simms
- Lon Chaney Jr. as Garland, Simms' partner
- John Bradford as Mike Scarlotti
- Milburn Morante as Clem Snodgrass
- Abe Lefton as Abe, Rodeo Announcer
- Merrill McCormick as Joe, Scarlotti Henchman
- Charles Sullivan as Frank, Scarlotti Henchman
- Buddy Roosevelt as Tony, Scarlotti Driver
- Lynton Brent as Dunn, Dealer
- Frankie Marvin as Wife-beating Prisoner
- Ed 'Oscar' Platt as Oscar, Gas Station Attendant
- Lou Fulton as Elmer, Stuttering Gas Station attendant
- Roy Rogers as Buck O'Keefe (uncredited)
- Hugh Farr as Tom O'Keefe (uncredited)
- Karl Farr as O'Keefe Brother (uncredited)
- Bob Nolan as O'Keefe Brother (uncredited)
- Tim Spencer as O'Keefe Brother (uncredited)

== Production ==
=== Stuntwork ===
- Ken Cooper
- Joe Yrigoyen

=== Soundtrack ===
- "The Old Corral" (Fleming Allen and Oliver Drake) by Gene Autry while riding in a wagon
- "One Man Band" (Smiley Burnette) by Smiley Burnette on his one-man band set-up
- "He's Gone, He's Gone Up the Trail" (Tim Spencer) by the Sons of the Pioneers in jail
- "In the Heart of the West" (Fleming Allen and Oliver Drake) by Gene Autry (vocals and guitar) and Irene Manning (vocals) in the saloon
- "Money Ain't No Use Anyway" (Gene Autry) by Gene Autry (vocals and guitar) in the saloon
- "Mexican Hat Dance" (Felipe A. Partichela) at the celebration and danced to by an unidentified couple
- "Silent Trails" (Tim Spencer) by the Sons of the Pioneers in jail
- "So Long Old Pinto" (Fleming Allen and Oliver Drake) by Gene Autry (vocals and guitar) at the celebration
- "Down Along the Sleepy Rio Grande" (Roy Rogers) by the Sons of the Pioneers
