= Shadow of Terror =

1945 film directed by Lew Landers

- Theatrical release poster
- Directed by: Lew Landers
- Screenplay by: Arthur St. Claire
- Story by: Sheldon Leonard
- Produced by: Jack Grant
- Starring: Richard Fraser; Grace Albertson; Cy Kendall; Emmett Lynn; Kenneth MacDonald; Eddie Acuff
- Cinematography: Jack Greenhalgh
- Edited by: Roy Livingston
- Music by: Karl Hajos
- Production company: Producers Releasing Corporation
- Distributed by: Producers Releasing Corporation
- Release date: October 5, 1945
- Running time: 60 minutes
- Country: United States
- Language: English

Shadow of Terror is a 1945 American thriller film directed by Lew Landers and written by Arthur St. Claire. The film stars Richard Fraser, Grace Albertson, Cy Kendall, Emmett Lynn, Kenneth MacDonald and Eddie Acuff. The film was released on October 5, 1945, by Producers Releasing Corporation.

== Cast ==
- Richard Fraser as Jim aka Howard Norton
- Grace Albertson as Joan Rutledge
- Cy Kendall as Victor Maxwell
- Emmett Lynn as Elmer
- Kenneth MacDonald as McKenzie
- Eddie Acuff as Joe Walters
- Sam Flint as Sheriff Dixon
