= Martha Vickers =

American actress (1925–1971)

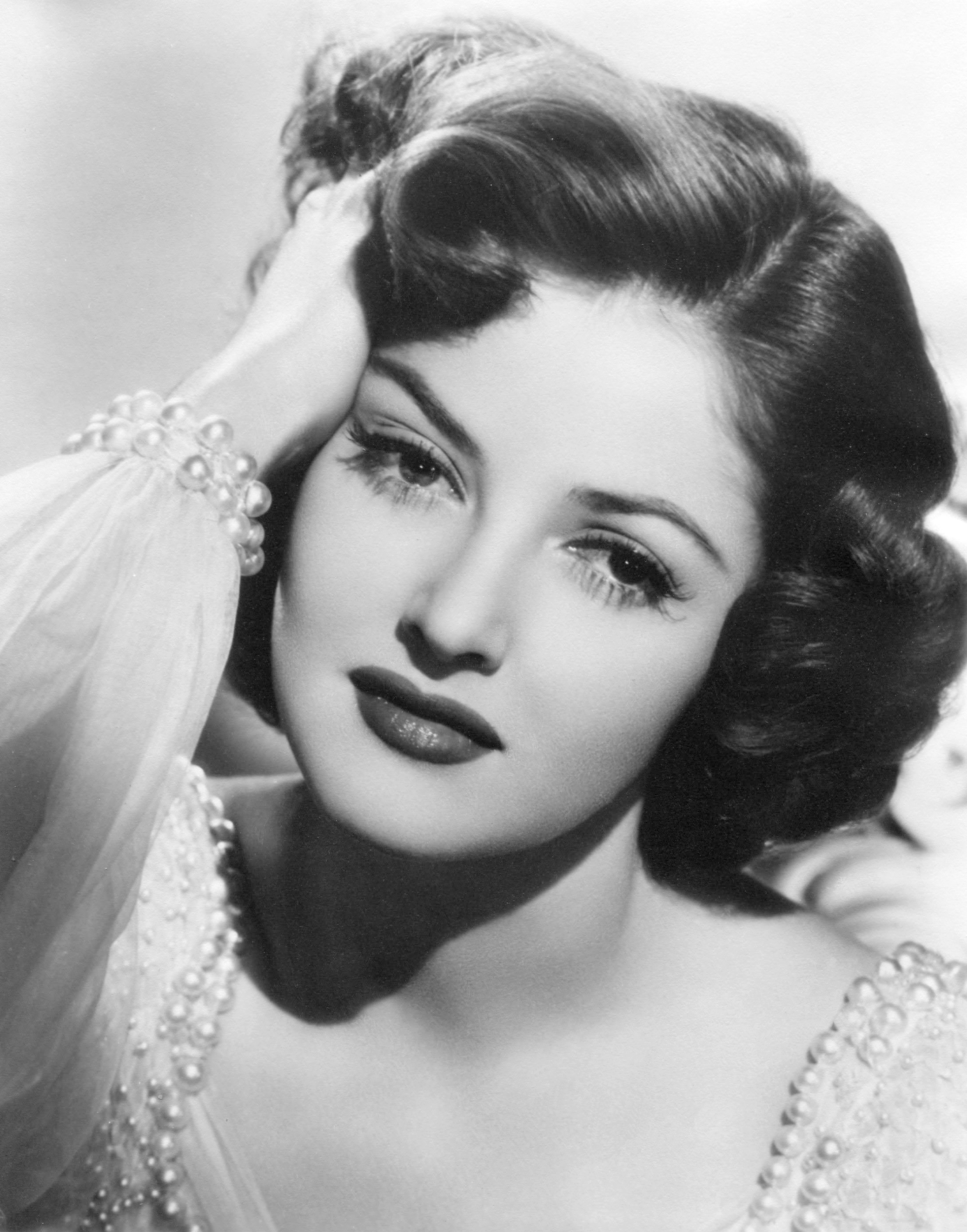
- Vickers in 1947
- Born: Martha MacVicar; May 28, 1925; Ann Arbor, Michigan, U.S.
- Died: November 2, 1971 (aged 46); Los Angeles, California, U.S.
- Resting place: Valhalla Memorial Park
- Occupations: Actress; model
- Years active: 1943–1960
- Spouses: A. C. Lyles (m. 1948; div. 1948) Mickey Rooney (m. 1949; div. 1951) Manuel Rojas (m. 1954; div. 1965)
- Children: 3

Martha Vickers (born Martha MacVicar; May 28, 1925 – November 2, 1971) was an American model and actress.

== Early life ==
Vickers was born Martha MacVicar in Ann Arbor, Michigan, where she spent her early childhood. Her father was an automobile dealer, and due to his career, the family relocated frequently. She subsequently attended schools across Chicago, Miami, St. Petersburg, Detroit, and Dallas before settling in Burbank, California in 1940 when her father assumed control of an agency there. Vickers was 15 at that time. During school she actively participated in countless student shows.

After finishing her studies in California, she began her career as a model and cover girl.

== Film ==
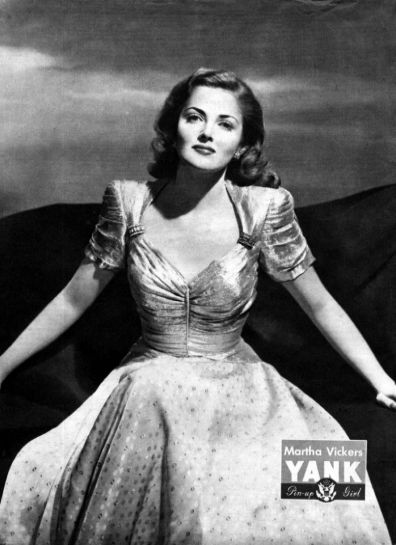
Martha Vickers pin-up in Yank (1945)

Vickers' first film role was a small uncredited part in Frankenstein Meets the Wolf Man (1943).

She played minor roles in several films during the early 1940s, working first at Universal Studios and then at RKO Pictures. In an interview, Vickers once stated that the roles given to her were so insignificant she preferred to return to modeling.

Her breakthrough came when she was selected from dozens of candidate models by Warner Bros. photographer Tom Kelly, for a girl with a specific look to play Carmen Sternwood, the promiscuous, drug-addicted younger sister of Lauren Bacall's character in The Big Sleep (1946). Following the discovery, studio executive Jack L. Warner signed her to a contract and suggested she alter her birth name from Martha MacVicar to the professional stage name Martha Vickers. Although it was only a supporting role, novelist Raymond Chandler noted that Vickers' standout performance prompted the studio to cut the picture in such a way that all her best scenes were left out, with the exception of just one

Vickers was also featured in a musical, The Time, the Place and the Girl (also 1946), followed by two Warner Bros. comedies, Love and Learn and That Way with Women (both 1947).

During the 1950s Vickers worked more often in television than in films, with her final performances in either medium released in 1960.

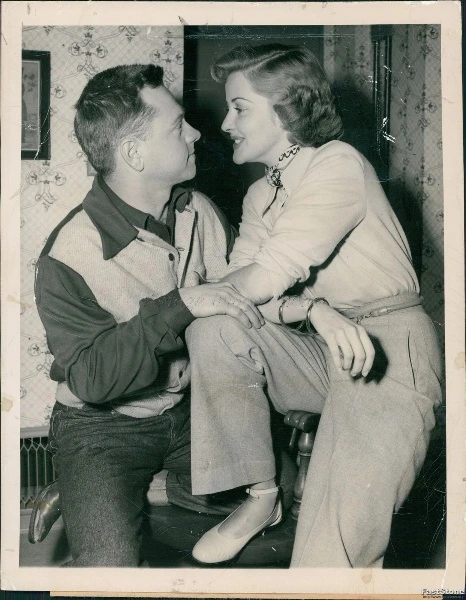
Martha Vickers and Mickey Rooney at her North Hollywood home during their engagement (1949)

== Television ==
Vickers starred in "The Last Thirty Minutes" on Ford Theatre in 1954. Her other TV appearances included the 1959 Perry Mason episode, "The Case of the Jaded Joker", in which she played Sheila Hayes. Her final two performances, in 1960, were on The Rebel, starring Nick Adams.

== Personal life ==
Vickers was married three times, to A.C. Lyles (March 15, 1948 – September 28, 1948), Mickey Rooney (June 3, 1949 – September 25, 1951), and actor Manuel Rojas (September 1, 1954 – May 5, 1965). Each marriage ended in divorce. Vickers had one son with Mickey Rooney, and two daughters with Rojas.

Outside of acting, Vickers enjoyed swimming and horseback riding. She also expressed a personal ambition to write a great novel, stating in a 1948 interview that she had already chosen a title for the project.

== Death ==
Vickers died at Valley Presbyterian Hospital in Los Angeles on November 2, 1971, at the age of 46, following a long illness. She is buried in Valhalla Memorial Park Cemetery in North Hollywood, California.

== Filmography ==
Film
Year	Title	Role	Notes
1943	Frankenstein Meets the Wolf Man	Margareta	Uncredited
1943	Captive Wild Woman	Dorothy Colman	Credited as Martha MacVicar
1943	Top Man	High school girl	Uncredited; Alternative title: Man of the Family
1943	Hi'ya, Sailor	Hostess	Uncredited
1944	This Is the Life	Girl	Uncredited
1944	Marine Raiders	Sally Parker	Credited as Martha MacVicar
1944	The Mummy's Ghost	Miss McLean, a student	Uncredited
1944	The Falcon in Mexico	Barbara Wade	Credited as Martha MacVicar
1946	The Big Sleep	Carmen Sternwood	
1946	The Time, the Place and the Girl	Victoria Cassel	
1947	The Man I Love	Virginia "Ginny" Brown	
1947	That Way with Women	Marcia Alden	
1947	Love and Learn	Barbara Wyngate	
1948	Ruthless	Susan Duane	
1949	Daughter of the West	Lolita Moreno	
1949	Bad Boy	Lila Strawn	Alternative title: The Story of Danny Lester
1949	Alimony	Kitty Travers aka Kate Klinger	
1955	The Big Bluff	Valerie Bancroft	Alternative title: Worthy Detectives
1957	The Burglar	Della	
1960	Four Fast Guns	Mary Hoag	
Television
Year	Title	Role	Notes
1952	The Unexpected		1 episode
1953-1951	General Electric Theater	Louise; Helen	2 episodes
1954	Ford Theatre	Nancy	2 episodes
1954	The Whistler	Louise	1 episode
1955	Fireside Theater	Ellen Weston; Julie	2 episodes
1956	The Millionaire	Ruth Murdock	1 episode
1957	Playhouse 90		1 episode
1959	Perry Mason	Sheila Hayes	1 episode
1960	The Rebel	Bess Weed; Agnes Boley	2 episodes

== See also ==
- Pin-ups of Yank, the Army Weekly
