= Shine On, Harvest Moon (1944 film) =

1944 film by David Butler

Shine on Harvest Moon
- Directed by: David Butler
- Written by: Sam Hellman; James V. Kern; Francis Swann; Richard Weil (screenplay and story)
- Produced by: William Jacobs
- Starring: Ann Sheridan; Dennis Morgan
- Cinematography: Arthur Edeson
- Edited by: Irene Morra
- Music by: Leo F. Forbstein
- Production company: Warner Bros. Pictures
- Distributed by: Warner Bros. Pictures
- Release date: April 8, 1944
- Running time: 111-112 minutes
- Country: United States
- Language: English
- Budget: $1,457,000
- Box office: $3,706,000

Shine On, Harvest Moon is a 1944 musical–biographical film about the vaudeville team of Nora Bayes and Jack Norworth, who wrote the popular song "Shine On, Harvest Moon." The film was directed by David Butler and stars Ann Sheridan, Dennis Morgan, Jack Carson, and Irene Manning. Sheridan's singing voice was dubbed by Lynn Martin.

The film is in black and white until its Technicolor finale sequence.

== Plot ==
In 1905, singer Nora Bayes (Ann Sheridan) impresses songwriter and performer Jack Norworth (Dennis Morgan) at a cabaret run by Dan Costello. Jack offers to get Nora an audition for vaudeville, unaware of Dan's feelings for her. After Nora rejects Dan's proposal, he purposely breaks up the audition, but Jack finds Nora another performing job. Eventually Jack and Nora team up successfully, but Dan continues to interfere any way that he can—including trying to steal Jack's best tune.

== Cast ==
- Ann Sheridan as Nora Bayes (singing voice dubbed by Lynn Martin)
- Dennis Morgan as Jack Norworth
- Jack Carson as The Great Georgetti
- Irene Manning as Blanche Mallory
- S. Z. Sakall as Poppa Carl
- Marie Wilson as Margie
- Robert Shayne as Dan Costello
- Bob Murphy as Police Sergeant
- The Four Step Brothers as Dance Team
- Philip Van Zandt as Cullen - Song Publisher (uncredited)

== Musical numbers ==
1. "Overture" - Played by orchestra behind titles
2. "Shine On, Harvest Moon / Daisy / In My Merry Oldsmobile" - Chorus
3. "San Antonio" - Irene Manning
4. "Be My Little Baby Bumble Bee" - Irene Manning
5. "My Own United States" - Ann Sheridan (dubbed by Lynn Martin) and chorus
6. "Time Waits for No One" - Ann Sheridan (dubbed by Lynn Martin).
7. "It Looks Like a Big Night Tonight" - Bob Murphy, Jack Carson, Dennis Morgan, Ann Sheridan (dubbed by Lynn Martin) and chorus.
8. "Time Waits for No One" (reprise) - Ann Sheridan (dubbed by Lynn Martin)
9. "We're Doing Our Best / Don't Let the Rainy Days Get You" - Ann Sheridan (dubbed by Lynn Martin) and Irene Manning.
10. "How Can They Tell That I'm Irish?" - Ann Sheridan (dubbed by Lynn Martin)
11. "Shine On, Harvest Moon" - Dennis Morgan and Ann Sheridan (dubbed by Lynn Martin)
12. "When It's Apple Blossom Time in Normandy / Take Me Out to the Ball Game / I've Got a Garden in Sweden / Breezin' Along with the Breeze / Who's Your Honey Lamb?" - Dennis Morgan and Ann Sheridan (dubbed by Lynn Martin)
13. "So Dumb but So Beautiful" - Jack Carson and Marie Wilson, dancing by the Ashburns
14. "Shine On, Harvest Moon" (reprise) - Dennis Morgan
15. "Thank You for the Dance" - Irene Manning and Chorus.
16. "Every Little Movement (Has a Meaning of Its Own)" - Irene Manning
17. "I Go for You" - Dennis Morgan and Ann Sheridan (dubbed by Lynn Martin).
18. "Just Like a Gypsy" - Ann Sheridan (dubbed by Lynn Martin)
19. "Just Like a Gypsy" (reprise) - Phyllis Kennedy.
20. Finale:

- "Shine On, Harvest Moon" - Dennis Morgan and Ann Sheridan (dubbed by Lynn Martin)
- "Time Waits for No One" - Dennis Morgan and chorus
- "So Dumb but So Beautiful" - Jack Carson and Marie Wilson
- "Shine On, Harvest Moon" - Chorus, with dancing by the Four Step Brothers
- "Shine On, Harvest Moon" - Dennis Morgan, Ann Sheridan (dubbed by Lynn Martin) and chorus

== Reception ==
Bosley Crowther of The New York Times wrote: "What is done in the name of biography in the Warner Brothers' 'Shine on Harvest Moon' is something which shouldn't be done to a burglar—let alone to the memory of the late Nora Bayes. For this musical film in which that lady and her second husband, Jack Norworth, are supposedly represented in their joint and devoted careers is no more veracious to the real thing than if it were a story of Alice Faye. It is simply another of those musicals which dig back into the past for a score of nostalgic ditties and some old-time vaudeville atmosphere; a film in which a songsmith falls in love with a honky-tonk girl and sticks with her through trials and tribulations until they finally emerge together on top. And if anyone goes expecting to see Ann Sheridan play Nora Bayes, or Dennis Morgan play Jack Norworth, this is to make it understood that you will not."

According to Warner Bros. records, the film earned $2,557,000 domestically and $1,149,000 abroad.
