= Ladies Courageous =

1944 film by John Rawlins

- Theatrical poster
- Directed by: John Rawlins
- Screenplay by: Doris Gilbert; Norman Reilly Raine
- Story by: Doris Gilbert; Norman Reilly Raine
- Based on: novel "Looking For Trouble" by Virginia Spencer Cowles
- Produced by: Walter Wanger
- Starring: Loretta Young; Geraldine Fitzgerald
- Cinematography: Hal Mohr
- Edited by: Philip Cahn
- Music by: Dimitri Tiomkin
- Production company: Walter Wanger Productions
- Distributed by: Universal Pictures
- Release date: February 1, 1944 (United States)
- Running time: 88 minutes
- Country: United States
- Language: English
- Budget: $834,260
- Box office: $1,072,763

Ladies Courageous (also called Fury in the Sky in a 1950 Realart re-release) is a 1944 war film based on the novel Looking For Trouble (1941) by Virginia Spencer Cowles. Directed by John Rawlins, the film stars Loretta Young and Geraldine Fitzgerald. It tells the story of the paramilitary Women's Auxiliary Ferrying Squadron formed in the United States during World War II. Film historians and scholars consider Ladies Courageous an à-clef story of famed aviator Jacqueline Cochran and test pilot Nancy Harkness Love's work to mobilize women pilots to contribute to the war effort.

== Plot ==
In World War II, Roberta Harper (Loretta Young) leads the Women's Auxiliary Ferrying Squadron (WAFS), made up of 25 women who ferry aircraft across the United States allowing male pilots to be released for combat service. Despite their success, her commanding officer, Colonel Andy Brennan (Richard Fraser) says that her pilots may not be able to handle dangerous missions. Roberta also has to contend with her impetuous sister, Virginia "Virgie" Alford (Geraldine Fitzgerald), and other concerns such as an affair involving Nadine Shannon (Diana Barrymore), one of her pilots. Famous aerobatic pilot Gerry Vail (Anne Gwynne), a member of "The Flying Vails", is afraid that her 100th flight may be her last, a fate that befell her father and brothers during their 100th performance. Roberta assures her that her 100th flight has already taken place.

The WAFS soon have a real tragedy when one of their own, Jill Romilly (Lois Collier), dies in a crash. With the depression that sets in among the women, a top-secret mission to deliver an aircraft to "Easy Queen Island," a front line air base in the Pacific, appears to be the way to prove their worth to their army superiors. Roberta is mortified when publicity-seeking Virgie crashes her aircraft on purpose and is "washed-out" by her older sister. (Note: In military parlance, being "washed-out" is the equivalent of being fired or dismissed.) Roberta accepts the blame for tolerating Virgie's reckless behavior, and resigns from the WAFS. She then learns her husband Tommy (Phillip Terry) is "missing in action". Virgie tries to make things right, but after stealing an aircraft to fly to army headquarters in Washington, crashes and nearly kills herself.

Although the WAFS seems to be in disarray, a surprise announcement by Brigadier General Wade (Samuel S. Hinds), a high-ranking Pentagon officer, changes everything. He informs Roberta, who has recently returned as their leader, that the unit is to be part of the military as the Women Airforce Service Pilots (WASPS). The ferry mission to the Pacific has also been reinstated. As the squadron readies for their new mission, Roberta is reunited with her husband, who returned home safely. The squadron is finally able to take off and head to the Pacific to deliver much-needed combat aircraft, including the latest fighter and bomber aircraft from American factories.

== Cast ==
- Loretta Young as Roberta Harper
- Geraldine Fitzgerald as [Virginia] "Virgie" Alford
- Diana Barrymore as Nadine Shannon
- Anne Gwynne as Gerry Vail
- Evelyn Ankers as Wilhelmina Von Kronk
- Phillip Terry as Major Tommy Harper
- David Bruce as Frank Garrison
- Lois Collier as Jill Romilly
- June Vincent as Mary Frances Wright
- Samuel S. Hinds as Brig. General Wade
- Richard Fraser as Colonel Andy Brennan
- Frank Jenks as "Snapper" Anthony Walgreen
- Janet Shaw as "Bee Jay"
- Kane Richmond as Alex Anderson

(Note: Both future stars Ruth Roman and Blake Edwards appear in uncredited roles as a WAFS pilot and pilot, respectively.)

== Production ==
Ladies Courageous featured the onscreen notice, "... sanctioned by the United States Army Air Forces as the official motion-picture story of the Women's Auxiliary Ferrying Squadron, now known as the Wasps, Women's Air Force Service Pilots." The genesis of the film came in 1942 when Colonel Mason Wright, the head of the War Department Bureau of Public Relations motion picture branch, contacted producer Walter Wanger to make a film about the WAFS. After approval of the script, under the working title of "When Ladies Fly", pre-production began with the choice of Loretta Young, under contract at Universal Pictures, as the lead, with Geraldine Fitzgerald, on loan from Warner Bros., playing her younger sister. While director John Rawlins was about to begin principal photography, the United States Army Air Forces reviewed its commitment to the project, demanding major script revisions and threatening to have the film closed down. Although the initial script had been approved, the USAAF was worried the film treatment was unsympathetic to women and that the film subject was no longer relevant, since on August 5, 1943, the Women Airforce Service Pilots (WASPS) had absorbed the earlier organization.

Wanger argued that considerable financial commitment had already been made, but faced with opposition from the military, relented and agreed to the 13 changes that were demanded. Principal photography for Ladies Courageous at both Universal Pictures Studios and location shooting at the Long Beach Army Air Field in California began on August 23 and continued to early November 1943. With the renewed cooperation of the USAAF, a large number of operational aircraft were made available, including Boeing B-17 Flying Fortress and Consolidated B-24 Liberator bombers, as well as Curtiss P-40 Warhawk, North American P-51 Mustang and Republic P-47 Thunderbolt fighters and North American T-6 Texan trainers.

The film was the first screenplay of prolific radio writer Doris Gilbert, daughter of Louis Wolfe Gilbert.

== Reception ==
In an attempt to "reboot" the film, Ladies Courageous was reissued as Fury in the Sky in 1950.

By the time the troubled production reached the screen, Ladies Courageous was already the subject of a congressional review of the formation of the Women Airforce Service Pilots. The film also struck a discordant tone with viewers and critics alike, who were not pleased with what Variety characterized as "... over-theatricalized" portrayals. Reviewer Thomas M. Pryor emphatically noted in The New York Times that "... 'Ladies Courageous' represents a very curious compliment to the WAFS on the part of its producer, Walter Wanger, and the Army Air Force, which sanctioned and participated in the making of the picture, now at Loew's Criterion. Such hysterics, such bickering and generally unladylike, nay unpatriotic, conduct on the part of a supposedly representative group of American women this reviewer has never before seen upon the screen."

A group of WASPS fliers happened upon the film being shown in an Orlando, Florida, theater in 1944, and were astonished at the soap-opera histrionics exhibited by the characters on screen. They immediately dubbed the film "Ladies Outrageous".

After Ladies Courageous recorded a net loss of $186,691, it was reissued postwar as Fury in the Sky in 1950, but did not fare much better with the public. More recent evaluations ranged from a lukewarm Leonard Maltin review - "Well-meant idea fails because of hackneyed script and situations ..." – to noted aviation film historian Bruce Orriss, who dismissed the film as "... little more than an embarrassment to the members of this earnest group of pilots."

== See also ==
- United States Transportation Command
- United States home front during World War II
- American propaganda during World War II
