= Love and Learn (1947 film) =

1947 film by Frederick de Cordova

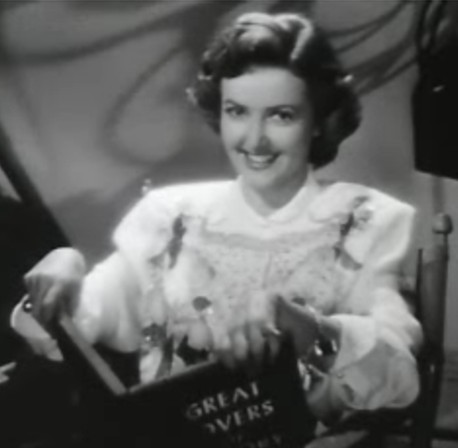
- Martha Vickers in Love and Learn
- Directed by: Frederick de Cordova
- Screenplay by: Eugene Conrad; I. A. L. Diamond; Francis Swann
- Story by: Harry Sauber
- Produced by: William Jacobs
- Starring: Jack Carson; Robert Hutton; Martha Vickers; Janis Paige; Otto Kruger
- Cinematography: Wesley Anderson
- Edited by: Frank Magee
- Music by: Max Steiner
- Production company: Warner Bros. Pictures
- Distributed by: Warner Bros. Pictures
- Release date: May 2, 1947
- Running time: 83 minutes
- Country: United States
- Language: English
- Box office: $1.5 million (US)

Love and Learn is a 1947 American comedy film directed by Frederick de Cordova and written by Eugene Conrad, I. A. L. Diamond and Francis Swann (from a story by Harry Sauber). It stars Jack Carson, Robert Hutton, Martha Vickers, Janis Paige and Otto Kruger. The film was released by Warner Bros. Pictures on May 2, 1947.

== Plot ==
Frustrated because they cannot get their songs published, Jingles Collins and Bob Grant decide to leave New York City and return home. On one last night out on the town, joined by Jingles' sweetheart Jackie, they encounter Barbara Wyngate, mistaking her for a dance hostess when she is actually a wealthy young heiress.

Barbara keeps her identity a secret after falling for Bob and pays to have a song published. With assistance from her father, she also gives expensive gifts. Bob at first suspects her to be some kind of kleptomaniac, then spots her father with her and angrily assumes Barbara is a mistress of a much older man.

Refusing to listen to her explanation, Bob becomes so distant that Barbara decides to elope with her boring fiancé Willard against her better judgment. Andrew Wyngate finally explains the truth to Bob and together they hurry to put a stop to the wedding.

== Cast ==
- Jack Carson as Jingles Collins
- Robert Hutton as Bob Grant
- Martha Vickers as Barbara Wyngate
- Janis Paige as Jackie
- Otto Kruger as Andrew Wyngate
- Barbara Brown as Victoria Wyngate
- Tom D'Andrea as Wells
- Florence Bates as Mrs. Bella Davis
- Craig Stevens as Willard Deckerr
- Angela Greene as Phyllis McGillicuddy
- Don McGuire as Delaney
- John Alvin as William
- Herbert Anderson as Pete
- Jane Harker as Receptionist
- Lou Nova as Marty

== Reception ==
T.M.P. of The New York Times reviewed the film negatively, saying it was "so inept in execution and conception that it is hard to believe it comes from the Warner Brothers studio."
