= The Falcon in Mexico =

1944 film by William A. Berke

- Film poster
- Directed by: William Berke
- Screenplay by: Gerald Geraghty; George Worthing Yates
- Based on: Characters created by Michael Arlen
- Produced by: Maurice Geraghty
- Starring: Tom Conway; Mona Maris; Martha Vickers
- Cinematography: Frank Redman
- Edited by: Joseph Noriega
- Music by: C. Bakaleinikoff; Leigh Harline; Aaron Gonzales
- Production company: RKO Radio Pictures Inc.
- Distributed by: RKO Radio Pictures
- Release date: August 4, 1944
- Running time: 70 min.
- Country: United States
- Language: English

The Falcon in Mexico is a 1944 film directed by William Berke and stars Tom Conway in his recurring role as a suave amateur sleuth, supported by Mona Maris and Martha Vickers. Conway would play the Falcon seven more times before RKO retired the franchise in 1946.The Falcon in Mexico was the ninth of 16 films in the Falcon detective series. The film features many second unit sequences filmed in Mexico and Brazil; the latter scenes from Orson Welles's aborted film It's All True.

== Plot ==
Tom Lawrence, aka the Falcon, helps Dolores Ybarra enter an art gallery late at night to supposedly recover a painting that belongs to her. The Falcon discovers that the woman is the model for the artist's painting. However, the artist, Humphrey Wade has been dead for 15 years. The owner of the gallery lies murdered on the floor. When the security guards arrive, alerted by a burglar alarm, they try to arrest Tom but he escapes with the painting and goes to the home of Winthrop "Lucky Diamond" Hughes, a collector of Wade's work.

Wanted by the American police for murder, the Falcon finds Barbara, the late artist's daughter, and they travel to Mexico City. At the airport, Barbara is met by a car from the La Casa Del Lago Inn and slips away. After she drives away, Tom hires taxi driver Manuel Romero and his son, Pancho, to follow her.

The La Casa Del Lago Inn is located in a country village was where her father lived and worked. Barbara introduces Tom to her stepmother Raquel, a dancer, and Raquel's partner and new husband Anton, who warns Tom to leave Barbara alone and get out of Mexico.

At the inn, desk clerk Paula Dudley shows the Wade studio, where Tom finds a drawing done in Wade's style, with its paint still wet. Dolores, searching for her portrait in Tom's room, is surprised by his early return, but when he pursues her into the hallway, she makes her getaway. When he returns to his room, an unknown assailant knocks him unconscious and steals the painting.

Don Carlos Ybarra searches for his daughter, but when her body turns up drowned in the lake, Tom thinks she has been murdered. Hughes arrives at the hotel without his famous diamond ring, a piece of jewelry he always wears. At dinner Barbara collapses, the victim of poisoning, leaving Tom with a puzzling mystery that may be linked to the disappearance of Humphrey Wade. If Wade is still alive, who stands to gain from that?

At the lake, Tom finds Paula, dead in a boat. Manuel appears and reveals that he is an undercover Mexican police officer, who also needs to find the killer on the loose. Back at the inn, they discover Barbara is missing and on her way to an island, where her father's grave is located. They locate her, seated in front of her father's crypt and wall headstone, accompanied by a woman. When Tom removes the headstone, however, he sees that the crypt is empty. The woman standing by Barbara tries to sidle away unnoticed, but the rest question her and find out she was paid to take Barbara to see her father's crypt and knows nothing else. After a performance of the Danza de los Viejitos (Dance of the Little, Old Men), a man dressed with an old man's mask, similar to the other dancers, approaches Barbara and reveals himself to be her father. He explains that his disappearance came about when his alleged suicide made his paintings valuable.

As Wade warns Barbara that their lives are in danger, he is shot dead. Tom deduces that the killer must be Hughes, and he sets a trap for him. Wearing Wade's disguise, Tom walks onto the plaza with Barbara by his side. Just before Hughes can shoot from a balcony, Manuel fires. With the killer brought to justice, Tom is given a dark-colored, engraved leather case from Manuel, who says his son, Pancho, bought it for Tom. He calls it a 'memorandum' instead of a memento, and then Tom bids farewell to his Mexican friends to board a plane bound for home.

== Cast ==
- Tom Conway as Tom Lawrence
- Mona Maris as Raquel
- Martha Vickers as Barbara Wade
- Bryant Washburn as Humphrey Wade, artist
- Nestor Paiva as Manuel Romero
- Fernando Alvarado as Pancho Romero
- Joseph Vitale as Anton
- Mary Currier as Paula Dudley
- Cecilia Callejo as Dolores Ybarra
- Emory Parnell as James Winthrop "Lucky Diamond" Hughes
- Pedro de Cordoba as Don Carlos Ybarra
- George Lewis as Mexican detective
- Julian Rivero as Mexican doctor
- Juanita Alvarez as Singer
- Ruth Alvarez as Singer
- Alan Ward as Ajax policeman
- Sherry Hall as Ajax policeman
- Wheaton Chambers as Jarvis
- Chester Carlisle as Grenville
- Bert Moorhouse as Detective Marks
- Frank Mayo as Inspector O'Shea
- Frank O'Connor as Police officer
- Greta Christensen as Isabel
- Nina Campana as Duenna
- Chiche Baru as Senorita
- Lorraine Rivero as Headwaitress
- Iris Bynam as Maid
- Dorothy Olivero as Maid
- Theodore Rand as Dance specialty
- Geneva Hall as Dance specialty

== Production ==
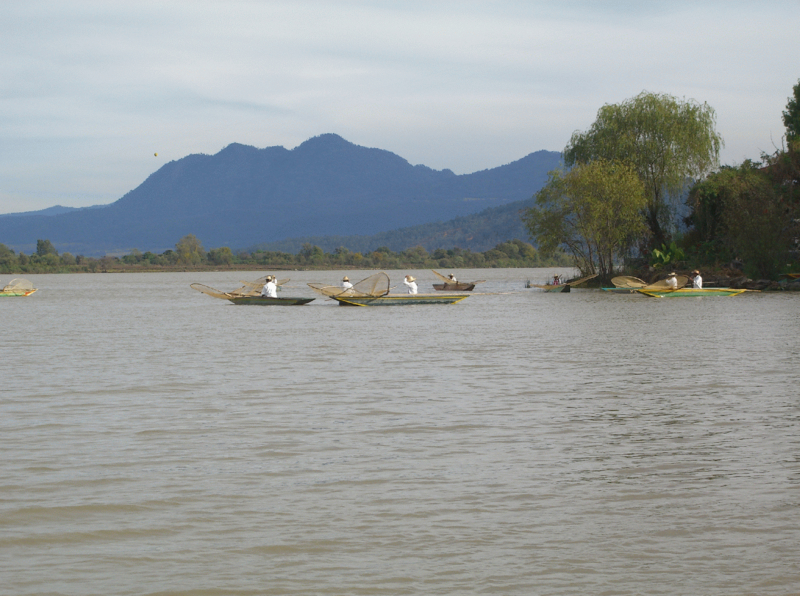
Butterfly-net fishing on Lake Pátzcuaro

Principal photography on "The Falcon in Mexico" took place from mid-March to April 4, 1944. (Note: Although not identified, key sequences of the film were shot in Pátzcuaro, Michoacán, Mexico.) Singers Juanita Alvarez and Ruth Alvarez appeared in The Falcon and the Co-eds (1943).

== Reception ==
At the time of its release, The Falcon in Mexico earned high critical marks, with Boxoffice declaring it, "... one of the best of the tried-and-true whodunit series." In a recent review of the Falcon series for the Time Out Film Guide, Tom Milne wrote, "Conway, bringing a lighter touch to the series (which managed its comic relief better than most), starred in nine films after The Falcon's Brother, most of them deft and surprisingly enjoyable."

== See also ==
- List of American films of 1944
