= Cy Kendall =

American actor (1898–1953)

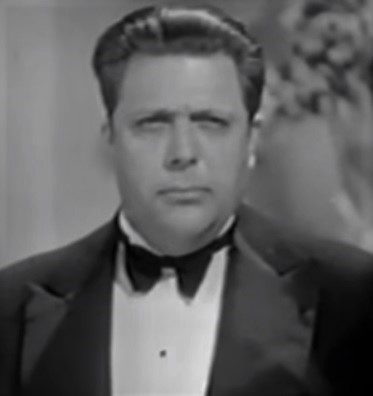
- Kendall in Bulldog Edition (1936)
- Born: Cyrus Willard Kendall; March 10, 1898; St. Louis, Missouri, U.S.
- Died: July 22, 1953 (aged 55); Woodland Hills, Los Angeles, California, U.S.
- Resting place: Mountain View Cemetery and Mausoluem, Altadena, California, U.S.
- Occupation: Actor
- Years active: 1935–1950
- Spouse: Margaret Kendall
- Children: 3

Cyrus Willard Kendall (March 10, 1898 – July 22, 1953) was an American film actor. He appeared in more than 140 films between 1935 and 1950. Kendall's heavy-set, square-jawed appearance and deep voice were perfect for wiseguy roles such as policemen and police chiefs, wardens, military officers, bartenders, reporters, and mobsters.

On old-time radio, Kendall portrayed Judge Carter in the drama The Remarkable Miss Tuttle. On early television, he played detective Jonas Flint on the game show Armchair Detective.

Kendall was born in St. Louis, Missouri, and died in Woodland Hills, California of heart problems.

== Filmography ==
- His Night Out (1935) - Detective (uncredited)
- Hitch Hike Lady (1935) - Fruit Dealer (uncredited)
- Dancing Feet (1936) - Hotel Detective
- Man Hunt (1936) - Sheriff at Hackett
- King of the Pecos (1936) - Alexander Stiles
- Dancing Pirate (1936) - Bouncing Betty's Cook (uncredited)
- The Lonely Trail (1936) - Adjutant General Benedict Holden
- San Francisco (1936) - Headwaiter (uncredited)
- Hot Money (1936) - Joe Morgan
- Women Are Trouble (1936) - Inspector Matson
- Sworn Enemy (1936) - Simmons
- Bulldog Edition (1936) - Nick Enright
- Sea Spoilers (1936) - Detective
- The Public Pays (1936, Short) - Police Chief John Carney (uncredited)
- The Magnificent Brute (1936) - Chief of Police (uncredited)
- Once a Doctor (1937) - Dr. Deardon (scenes deleted)
- Midnight Court (1937) - Milt - the Reporter (uncredited)
- Land Beyond the Law (1937) - Slade Henaberry
- Angel's Holiday (1937) - Chief of Police Davis
- It Could Happen to You (1937) - Detective
- Public Wedding (1937) - Police Captain (uncredited)
- Meet the Boyfriend (1937) - Walters
- They Won't Forget (1937) - Detective Laneart
- White Bondage (1937) - Rickets (uncredited)
- Hot Water (1937) - Chief of Police (uncredited)
- The Shadow Strikes (1937) - Brossett
- Borrowing Trouble (1937) - Chief Kelly
- She Loved a Fireman (1937) - Deputy Fire Commissioner (uncredited)
- The Invisible Menace (1938) - Colonel Rogers
- Gold Is Where You Find It (1938) - Kingan (uncredited)
- Hawaii Calls (1938) - Hawaiian Policeman
- The Girl of the Golden West (1938) - Hank - Gambler (scenes deleted)
- Rawhide (1938) - Sheriff Kale
- Crime School (1938) - Morgan
- Safety in Numbers (1938) - Chief of Police
- Little Miss Thoroughbred (1938) - District Attorney Sheridan
- Valley of the Giants (1938) - Sheriff Graber
- Breaking the Ice (1938) - Judd
- The Night Hawk (1938) - Capt. Teague
- Young Dr. Kildare (1938) - Charlie (uncredited)
- Next Time I Marry (1938) - A.L. Butterfield (uncredited)
- Pacific Liner (1939) - Deadeyes
- Stand Up and Fight (1939) - Foreman Ross
- North of Shanghai (1939) - Minor Role (uncredited)
- Twelve Crowded Hours (1939) - George Costain
- Trouble in Sundown (1939) - Ross Daggett
- Man of Conquest (1939) - Indian Affairs Agent (uncredited)
- Mickey the Kid (1939) - Waldo (uncredited)
- Frontier Marshal (1939) - Winning Card Player (uncredited)
- Fugitive at Large (1939) - Prison Guard Captain
- The Angels Wash Their Faces (1939) - Haines
- Blackmail (1939) - Southern Sheriff (uncredited)
- Calling All Marines (1939) - Big Joe Kelly
- The Hunchback of Notre Dame (1939) - Nobleman Signing Petition (uncredited)
- The Green Hornet (1940, Serial) - Curtis Monroe
- The House Across the Bay (1940) - Crawley
- Women Without Names (1940) - Guard (uncredited)
- My Favorite Wife (1940) - Police Detective Arresting Nick (uncredited)
- Opened by Mistake (1940) - Oberweiser (uncredited)
- Men Without Souls (1940) - Capt. White
- The Saint Takes Over (1940) - Max Bremer
- Prairie Law (1940) - Pete Gore
- Andy Hardy Meets Debutante (1940) - Mr. Carrillo
- Gold Rush Maisie (1940) - Assayer (uncredited)
- Sky Murder (1940) - Harrigan - House Detective (uncredited)
- Junior G-Men (1940) - Brand
- Hullabaloo (1940) - Mr. Wilson
- Youth Will Be Served (1940) - Sheriff
- The Fargo Kid (1940) - Nick Kane
- Robin Hood of the Pecos (1941) - Ambrose Ballard
- Ride, Kelly, Ride (1941) - Louis Becker
- They Dare Not Love (1941) - Maj. Kenlein (uncredited)
- Billy the Kid (1941) - Cass McAndrews (Sheriff)
- Blossoms in the Dust (1941) - Harrington (uncredited)
- Mystery Ship (1941) - Condor
- Honky Tonk (1941) - Man with Tar (uncredited)
- Johnny Eager (1941) - Halligan
- Pacific Blackout (1941) - Hotel Clerk
- Fly-by-Night (1942) - Dahlig
- Born to Sing (1942) - Police Captain
- Alias Boston Blackie (1942) - Jumbo Madigan
- The Wife Takes a Flyer (1942) - Gestapo Agent (uncredited)
- Sunday Punch (1942) - Boxing Promoter (uncredited)
- Tarzan's New York Adventure (1942) - Colonel Ralph Sergeant
- Boston Blackie Goes Hollywood (1942) - Jumbo Madigan (uncredited)
- Road to Morocco (1942) - Fruit Vendor (uncredited)
- Silver Queen (1942) - Sheriff
- A Night to Remember (1942) - Louis Kaufman (uncredited)
- After Midnight with Boston Blackie (1943) - Joe Herschel (uncredited)
- A Gentle Gangster (1943) - Al Malone
- A Lady Takes a Chance (1943) - Gambling House Boss
- The Chance of a Lifetime (1943) - Jumbo Madigan (uncredited)
- Whispering Footsteps (1943) - Detective Brad Dolan
- Meatless Flyday (1944, Short) - Spider (voice, uncredited)
- Lady in the Death House (1944) - Detective
- The Whistler (1944) - Gus, Bartender (uncredited)
- Outlaw Trail (1944) - Honest John Travers
- The Chinese Cat (1944) - Webster Deacon
- Roger Touhy, Gangster (1944) - Edward Latham (uncredited)
- Christmas Holiday (1944) - Teddy Jordan (uncredited)
- Wilson (1944) - Charles F. Murphy (uncredited)
- Kismet (1944) - Herald (uncredited)
- Crime by Night (1944) - Sheriff Max Ambers
- Tall in the Saddle (1944) - Cap, Bartender (uncredited)
- The Last Ride (1944) - Capt. Butler
- A Wave, a WAC and a Marine (1944) - Mike
- Girl Rush (1944) - 'Honest' Greg Barlan
- Mystery of the River Boat (1944, Serial) - Police Chief F.E. Dumont
- Dancing in Manhattan (1944) - Inspector Kirby
- Tahiti Nights (1944) - Chief Enoka
- She Gets Her Man (1945) - Police Chief Brodie
- Jungle Queen (1945, Serial) - Tambosa Tim [Chs. 6-8]
- The Cisco Kid Returns (1945) - Jennings - Hired killer
- Docks of New York (1945) - Compeau
- The Power of the Whistler (1945) - Druggist (uncredited)
- A Thousand and One Nights (1945) - Auctioneer (uncredited)
- Secret Agent X-9 (1945, Serial) - Lucky Kamber
- Shadow of Terror (1945) - Victor Maxwell
- The Tiger Woman (1945) - Inspector Henry Leggett
- Cornered (1945) - Detective (uncredited)
- Scarlet Street (1945) - Nick (uncredited)
- The Scarlet Horseman (1946) - Amigo Mañana
- The Glass Alibi (1946) - Red Hogan
- Without Reservations (1946) - Bail Bondsman (uncredited)
- Blonde for a Day (1946) - Inspector Pete Rafferty
- Inside Job (1946) - Police Capt. Martin (uncredited)
- The Invisible Informer (1946) - Sheriff Ladeau
- Lady in the Lake (1946) - Jailer (uncredited)
- Sinbad the Sailor (1947) - Hassan-Ben-Hassan (uncredited)
- The Farmer's Daughter (1947) - Sweeney
- Desperate (1947) - Ace Morgan (uncredited)
- Bury Me Dead (1947) - Detective (uncredited)
- Queen Esther: A Story from the Bible (1947) - Chamberlain
- Joe Palooka in Fighting Mad (1948) - Commissioner R.E. Carfter
- Call Northside 777 (1948) - Second Bartender (uncredited)
- Perilous Waters (1948) - The Boss
- Tenth Avenue Angel (1948) - Higgins (uncredited)
- Sword of the Avenger (1948) - Count Velasquez
- Race Street (1948) - Shoeshine Customer (uncredited)
- In This Corner (1948) - Tiny Reed
- Bungalow 13 (1948) - Police Officer (uncredited)
- Mysteries of Chinatown (1949, TV Series) - Regular Player (1949-1950)
- Nancy Goes to Rio (1950) - Capt. Ritchie (uncredited)
