= The Big Shot (1942 film) =

1942 film by Lewis Seiler

- Directed by: Lewis Seiler
- Written by: Bertram Millhauser; Abem Finkel; Daniel Fuchs
- Produced by: Walter MacEwen
- Starring: Humphrey Bogart; Irene Manning
- Cinematography: Sid Hickox
- Edited by: Jack Killifer
- Music by: Adolph Deutsch
- Production company: Warner Bros. Pictures
- Distributed by: Warner Bros. Pictures
- Release date: June 13, 1942
- Running time: 82 minutes
- Country: United States
- Language: English
- Budget: $417,000
- Box office: $1,783,000

The Big Shot (1942) is an American film noir crime drama film directed by Lewis Seiler starring Humphrey Bogart as a crime boss and Irene Manning as the woman he falls in love with. Having finally reached stardom with such projects as The Maltese Falcon (1941), this would be the last film in which former supporting player Bogart would portray a gangster for Warner Bros. Pictures. (He would play a gangster one last time in his penultimate film, The Desperate Hours, distributed by Paramount).

Although The Big Shot entered production after Across the Pacific, it was released nearly three months earlier. Considered one of Bogart's lesser-known works, contemporary reviews of The Big Shot describe it as an unexceptional throwback to his earlier gangster films, most likely trying to take advantage of the success of crime drama High Sierra (1941). It was released on DVD for the first time by Warner Archive early in 2015.

== Plot summary ==
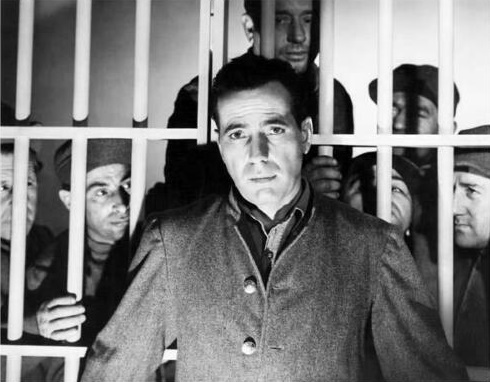
Humphrey Bogart in The Big Shot

Three-time loser Duke Berne is dying in a prison hospital, conveying the story in flashback how he ended up there. After being released from prison previously, he tries to go straight, but is tempted to join a holdup gang led by lawyer Martin Fleming. Fleming's wife, Lorna, was once Duke's girlfriend, and says she still loves him and merely married Fleming for his money, and she keeps him out of a planned robbery, but Duke is falsely identified as one of the gang by a witness. Fleming is forced to defend Duke after the latter threatens to expose his criminal activities to the authorities. Fleming gets a young, naive associate, George Anderson, to provide an alibi for Duke while testifying in court, but George's girlfriend Ruth Carter takes the stand to testify he was with her instead of him when the robbery took place, a deliberate frame-up planned by Fleming after he found out from a member of the gang that Duke spent time with Lorna. Duke is sentenced to life in prison, with George also sentenced to a year in jail for committing perjury.

Duke manages to escape from prison with the help of another inmate, Dancer. George witnesses the breakout and tries to persuade Duke to give himself up, but Duke refuses and knocks him out. During the breakout, Dancer stabs and seriously wounds a prison guard, and is shot dead while trying to escape. Duke, however, manages to escape and is met outside the prison by Lorna in her car, and they both drive to an isolated and snowbound mountain lodge. Back in the prison, George is accused of trying to escape and stabbing the prison guard by the prison warden. The warden is informed by a phone call that the guard has died from his injuries, and George is charged with murder.

Fleming finds out from an associate of Duke's where he and Lorna are in hiding and tips off the police. While listening to a radio at the mountain lodge, Duke hears that George is to be tried for a murder, and decides to help George by telling the warden who really killed the prison guard. Leaving their hideout by car, Duke and Lorna are ambushed and chased by police. Duke manages to give them the slip, but Lorna is killed by a gunshot. Duke makes his way to Fleming's home and holds him up by gunpoint while phoning the warden to explain that Fleming was responsible for arranging the robbery that led to Duke's false imprisonment. Fleming manages to pull a gun on Duke and shoot him while making the call, injuring him severely, but Duke shoots Fleming back, killing him.

Duke finishes his story that clears George of trying to escape from prison and killing the prison guard, with George, Ruth, and the warden at his bedside. They leave as Duke wishes to be alone in his final moments while he tries to smoke one last cigarette, and asks a male nurse present to open the blinds to let in some daylight. As the daylight comes through, Duke drops the cigarette to the floor and dies.

== Cast ==
- Humphrey Bogart as Joseph "Duke" Berne
- Irene Manning as Lorna Fleming
- Richard Travis as George Anderson
- Susan Peters as Ruth Carter
- Stanley Ridges as Martin T. Fleming, Attorney
- Minor Watson as Warden George Booth
- Chick Chandler as Frank "Dancer" Smith
- Joe Downing as Frenchy (credited as Joseph Downing)
- Howard da Silva as Sandor
- Murray Alper as Quinto, Convict
- Roland Drew as Faye
- John Ridgely as Tim
- Joe King as Prosecutor Toohey (credited as Joseph King)
- John Hamilton as Judge
- Virginia Brissac as Mrs. Booth
- William Edmunds as Sarto
- Virginia Sale as Mrs. Miggs
- Ken Christy as Kat, Convict
- Wallace Scott as Rusty

== Box Office ==
According to Warner Bros records the film earned $939,000 domestically and $844,000 foreign.
