= Blonde for a Day =

1946 film

- Theatrical release poster
- Directed by: Sam Newfield
- Screenplay by: Fred Myton
- Story by: Brett Halliday
- Produced by: Sigmund Neufeld
- Starring: Hugh Beaumont; Kathryn Adams; Cy Kendall; Richard Fraser; Paul Bryar; Mauritz Hugo; Charles C. Wilson
- Cinematography: Jack Greenhalgh
- Edited by: Holbrook N. Todd
- Production company: Sigmund Neufeld Productions
- Distributed by: Producers Releasing Corporation
- Release date: June 10, 1946
- Running time: 68 minutes
- Country: United States
- Language: English

Blonde for a Day is a 1946 American action film directed by Sam Newfield and written by Fred Myton. The film stars Hugh Beaumont, Kathryn Adams, Cy Kendall, Richard Fraser, Paul Bryar, Mauritz Hugo and Charles C. Wilson. The film was released on June 10, 1946, by Producers Releasing Corporation.

== Plot ==
A newspaper reporter, Tim Rourke, keeps writing articles attacking the police department for its failure to solve a chain of murders, and this nearly leads to the reporter's death. He calls in private-detective Michael Shayne, and Shayne turns up a blonde and a blackmailer.

== Cast ==
- Hugh Beaumont as Michael Shayne
- Kathryn Adams as Phyllis Hamilton
- Cy Kendall as Pete Rafferty
- Marjorie Hoshelle as Helen Porter
- Richard Fraser as Dillingham 'Dilly' Smith
- Paul Bryar as Tim Rourke
- Mauritz Hugo as Hank Brenner
- Charles C. Wilson as Will Gentry
- Sonia Sorel as Muriel Bronson
- Frank Ferguson as Walter Bronson
- Claire Rochelle as Minerva Dickens
