= Francis Swann =

American dramatist

Francis Swann (July 16, 1913 – August 27, 1983) was a playwright, novelist, and a film and television writer. He wrote several Broadway plays, most notable of which was Out of the Frying Pan. He wrote a number of screenplays for Warner Bros. and other studios, including the screenplay for 711 Ocean Drive (1950). Swann also wrote several books including The Brass Key and Royal Street. He was one of the early writers for the television soap opera Dark Shadows.

== Selected filmography ==
- Belle of Old Mexico (1950)
- Force of Impulse (1961)
