= Duncan Renaldo filmography =

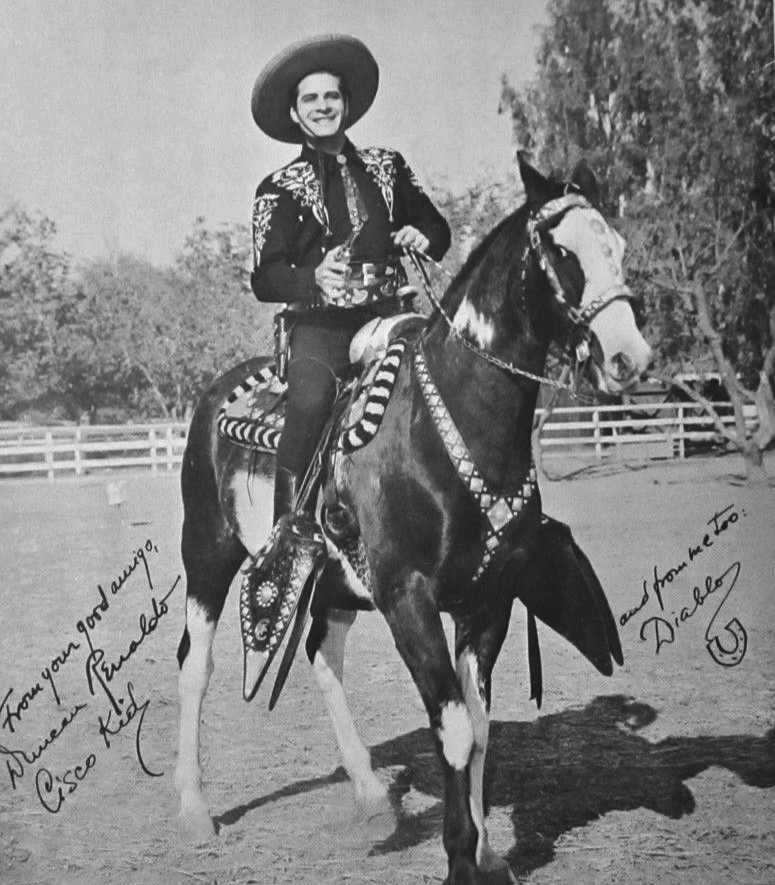
Duncan Renaldo as the Cisco Kid with his horse Diablo

Duncan Renaldo (1904–1980) was an American actor of European birth. He was best known in the 1950s United States for his lead role in The Cisco Kid, which co-starred Leo Carrillo as Pancho. The children's television series ran for six years and 156 episodes 1950–1956. He and Carrillo first crossed professional paths in the 1935 film Moonlight Murder. Prior to his television success, Renaldo appeared in 67 feature-length films beginning in the silent era. Metro-Goldwyn-Mayer hired him in 1929 for a silent version of The Bridge of San Luis Rey. Paramount Pictures cast him in five films, including the acclaimed Two Years Before the Mast and For Whom the Bell Tolls.

Twenty of his films were for Republic Pictures, appearing alongside Republic lead stars John Wayne, Gene Autry, Roy Rogers and Bob Steele. When Ray Corrigan left the popular Three Mesquiteers series of western films in 1939, rather than immediately casting another actor in his recurring role of Tucson Smith, Republic created the role of Rico for Renaldo who portrayed the character in seven subsequent Mesquiteer films.

Although Renaldo was seen by audiences most often as Spanish surnamed characters, the Romania-born actor never knew his own parents or his ethnic heritage. His film career took a two-year hiatus at McNeil Island Federal Prison for falsifying passport documents by claiming his birthplace as New Jersey. When President Franklin D. Roosevelt granted him a pardon in 1936, he was able to resume his career and was granted full American citizenship by Judge James O'Connor in 1941.

In 1945, he appeared in three Monogram Pictures films as the Cisco Kid, paired with Martin Garralaga as Cisco's sidekick Pancho. Preceding the successful television series, he and Leo Carrillo teamed up in 1949 and 1950 for five feature length Cisco Kid movies for United Artists, four of which he co-produced. For his contributions to the entertainment industry, Renaldo received a star at 1680 Vine Street on the Hollywood Walk of Fame on February 8, 1960. Dunan Renaldo also appeared in the Republic Pictures 1937 serial Zorro Rides Again, as Zorro's confidant Renaldo.

== Films ==
Feature films credits of Duncan Renaldo
Title	Year	As actor (role)	As writer	Director	Producer	Studio/Distributor	Other cast members	Ref(s)
Clothes Make the Woman	1928	unknown		Tom Terriss	—	Tiffany-Stahl Productions	Eve Southern, Walter Pidgeon	
The Naughty Duchess	1928	Armand		Tom Terriss	—	Tiffany-Stahl Productions	Eve Southern, H. B. Warner	
The Bridge of San Luis Rey	1929	Esteban		Charles Brabin	—	Metro-Goldwyn-Mayer	Lili Damita, Raquel Torres	
Pals of the Prairie	1929	Francisco		Louis King	—	F.B.O. Productions, Inc.	Frank Rice, Buzz Barton	
Trader Horn	1931	Peru		W. S. Van Dyke	—	Metro-Goldwyn-Mayer	Harry Carey, Edwina Booth	
Trapped in Tia Juana	1932	Kenneth/El Zorro		Wallace Fox	George W. Weeks	Mayfair Pictures Corp, Action Pictures Inc.	Edwina Booth	
Public Stenographer	1933	Jerome Eagan		Lewis D. Collins	D. J. Mountan	Showmen's Pictures, Inc., State Rights, Screencraft Productions, Inc.	Lola Lane	
The Moth	1935	Don Pedro		Fred C. Newmeyer	Al Alt	Showmen's Pictures, Inc., Screencraft Productions, Inc.	Sally O'Neil, Paul Page, Wilfred Lucas	
Rebellion	1936	Ricardo Castillo		Lynn Shores	E. B. Derr	Crescent Pictures Corp.	Tom Keene, Rita Hayworth	
Two Minutes to Play	1936	Lew Ashley		Robert Hill	Sam Katzman	Victory Pictures Corp.	Herman Brix, Eddie Nugent	
Moonlight Murder	1936	Pedro		Edwin L. Marin	Lucian Hubbard, Ned Marin	MGM	Leo Carrillo, Chester Morris	
Lady Luck	1936	Tony Morelli		Charles Lamont	George R. Batcheller	Chesterfield Motion Pictures Corp	Patricia Farr, William Bakewell	
Mile-a-Minute-Love	1937	Count Ribalto	X	Elmer Clifton	Fanchon Royer	Fanchon Royer Features, Inc., State Rights	William Bakewell, Arletta Duncan	
Special Agent K-7	1937	Tony Black		Raymond K. Johnson	—	C. C. Burr Productions, Inc.	Walter McGrail, Queenie Smith	
Sky Racket	1937	unknown		Sam Katzman	Sam Katzman	Victory Pictures	Herman Bix, Joan Barclay	
Zorro Rides Again	1937	Renaldo		William Witney; John English	Sol C. Siegel	Republic Pictures	John Carroll; Helen Christian; Reed Howes; Noah Beery Sr. Richard Alexander	
Spawn of the North	1938	Ivan		Henry Hathaway	Albert Lewin	Paramount Pictures	George Raft, Henry Fonda, Dorothy Lamour, John Barrymore	
Ten Laps to Go	1938	Eddie DeSilva		Elmer Clifton	Fanchon Rover	Fanchon Royer Features, Inc., State Rights, Ace Pictures Corp	Rex Lease, Muriel Evans	
Tropic Holiday	1938	Young Blood		Theodore Reed	—	Paramount Pictures	Dorothy Lamour, Bob Burns, Ray Milland, Martha Raye, Binnie Barnes	
Rose of the Rio Grande	1938	Sebastian		William Nigh	Dorothy Davenport Reid	Monogram Pictures	Movita Castaneda, John Carroll	
Rough Riders' Round-up	1939	Alcalde Don Enriguez		Joseph Kane	Joseph Kane	Republic Pictures	Roy Rogers	
Cowboys from Texas	1939	Rico		George Sherman	Harry Grey	Republic Pictures	Robert Livingston, Raymond Hatton, Yakima Canutt	
South of the Border	1939	Andreo/Mendoza		George Sherman	William A. Berke	Republic Pictures	Gene Autry, Smiley Burnette	
The Kansas Terrors	1939	Rico		George Sherman	Harry Grey	Republic Pictures	Robert Livingston, Raymond Hatton, Yakima Canutt	
The Mad Empress	1939	Colonel Miguel Lopez		Miguel Contreras Torres	Miguel Contreras Torres	Warner Bros.	Conrad Nagel, Lionel Atwill, Medea Novora	
Zaza	1939	Animal trainer		George Cukor	Albert Lewin	Paramount Pictures	Claudette Colbert, Herbert Marshall, Bert Lahr	
Covered Wagon Days	1940	Rico		George Sherman	Harry Grey	Republic Pictures	Robert Livingston, Raymond Hatton	
Gaucho Serenade	1940	Gaucho Don José		Frank McDonald	William Berke	Republic Pictures	Gene Autry, Smiley Burnette	
Pioneers of the West	1940	Rico		Lester Orlebeck	Harry Grey	Republic Pictures	Robert Livingston, Raymond Hatton	
Oklahoma Renegades	1940	Rico		Nate Watt	Harry Grey	Republic Pictures	Robert Livingston, Raymond Hatton	
Heroes of the Saddle	1940	Rico		William Witney	Harry Grey	Republic Pictures	Robert Livingston, Raymond Hatton	
Rocky Mountain Rangers	1940	Rico		George Sherman	Harry Grey	Republic Pictures	Robert Livingston, Raymond Hatton	
Bad Men of Missouri	1941	Henchman		Ray Enright	Jack L. Warner	Warner Bros.	Dennis Morgan, Jane Wyman, Wayne Morris	
King of the Texas Rangers	1941	Pedro Garcia		William Witney, John English	Hiram S. Brown Jr	Republic Pictures	"Slingin' Sammy Baugh"	
Down Mexico Way	1941	Juan		Joseph Santley	Harry Grey	Republic Pictures	Gene Autry, Smiley Burnette	
Gauchos of El Dorado	1941	José Ojara, the Gaucho		Lester Orlebeck	Louis Gray	Republic Pictures	Bob Steele, Tom Tyler, Rufe Davis, Yakima Canutt	
Outlaws of the Desert	1941	Sheik Suleiman		Howard Bretherton	Harry Sherman	Paramount Pictures	William Boyd	
South of Panama	1941	Captain of police		Jean Yarbrough	Melville Shyer	Producers Releasing Corp., T. H. Richmond Productions, Inc.	Roger Pryor	
We Were Dancing	1942	Sam Estrella		Robert Z. Leonard	Robert Z. Leonard, Orville O. Dull	Metro-Goldwyn-Mayer	Norma Shearer, Melvyn Douglas, Gail Patrick	
A Yank in Libya	1942	Sheik Isic David		Albert Herman	George M. Merrick	Producers Releasing Corp., M & A Productions	H.B. Warner	
For Whom the Bell Tolls	1943	Lieutenant Berrendo		Sam Wood	Sam Wood	Paramount Pictures	Gary Cooper, Ingrid Bergman, Akim Tamiroff	
Mission to Moscow	1943	Italian reporter		Michael Curtiz	Jack L. Warner	Warner Bros.	Walter Huston, Ann Harding, Oskar Homolka	
Tiger Fangs	1943	Peter Jeremy		Sam Newfield	Jack Schwarz	Producers Releasing Corporation	Frank Buck	
Secret Service in Darkest Africa	1943	Captain Pierre LaSalle		Spencer Gordon Bennet	William J. O'Sullivan	Republic Pictures	Rod Cameron	
Border Patrol	1943	Commandant La Barca		Lesley Selander	Harry Sherman	United Artists	William Boyd, Robert Mitchum	
The Tiger Woman	1944	José Delgado		Spencer Gordon Bennet	William J. O'Sullivan	Republic Pictures	Linda Stirling	
The Desert Song	1944	Captain of the Guard		Robert Florey	Robert Buckner	Warner Bros.	Dennis Morgan, Irene Manning, Bruce Cabot	
Hands Across the Border	1944	Juan Morales		Joseph Kane	—	Republic Pictures	Roy Rogers	
The Fighting Seabees	1944	Juan		Edward Ludwig	Albert J. Cohen	Republic Pictures	John Wayne, Susan Hayward, Dennis O'Keefe, William Frawley	
Call of the South Seas	1944	Charcot		John English	Walter H. Goetz	Republic Pictures	Allan Lane, Janet Martin	
Around the World	1944	Dragoman		Allan Dwan	Allan Dwan	RKO Pictures	Kay Kyser, Mischa Auer, Joan Davis	
The San Antonio Kid	1944	Johnny Bennett, the San Antonio Kid		Howard Bretherton	William J. O'Sullivan	Republic Pictures	Bill Elliott, Robert Blake	
Sheriff of Sundown	1944	Chihuahua Ramirez		Lesley Selander	William J. O'Sullivan	Republic Pictures	Allan Lane	
In Old New Mexico	1945	The Cisco Kid		Phil Rosen	Philip N. Krasne	Monogram Pictures	Martin Garralaga	
The Cisco Kid Returns	1945	The Cisco Kid		John P. McCarthy	Philip N. Krasne	Monogram Pictures	Martin Garralaga	
South of the Rio Grande	1945	The Cisco Kid		Lambert Hillyer	Lindsley Parsons	Monogram Pictures	Martin Garralaga	
Don Ricardo Returns	1946	—	X	Terry O. Morse	James S. Burkett, Duncan Renaldo	Producers Releasing Corporation	Fred Coby, Isabelita	
Two Years Before the Mast	1946	Mexican captain		John Farrow	Seton I. Miller	Paramount Pictures	Alan Ladd, Brian Donlevy, William Bendix, Barry Fitzgerald, Howard Da Silva	
Bells of San Fernando	1947	—	X	Terry O. Morse	Duncan Renaldo, James S. Burkett	Screen Guild Productions, inc., Hillcrest Productions, Inc.	Donald Woods, Gloria Warren	
Jungle Flight	1947	Police Captain Costa		Sam Newfield	—	Pine-Thomas Productions, Paramount Pictures	Robert Lowery, Ann Savage, Barton MacLane	
Sword of the Avenger	1948	Fernando		Sidney Salkow	Sidney Salkow	Eagle-Lion Films, United Philippine Artists, Inc.	Ramon Delgado, Sigrid Gurie	
The Valiant Hombre	1949	The Cisco Kid		Wallace Fox	Philip N. Krasne, Duncan Renaldo	United Artists, Inter-American Productions, Inc.	Leo Carrillo, John Litel	
The Daring Caballero	1949	The Cisco Kid		Wallace Fox	Philip N. Krasne, Duncan Renaldo	United Artists, Inter-American Productions, Inc.	Leo Carrillo, Kippee Valez	
The Gay Amigo	1949	The Cisco Kid		Wallace Fox	Philip N. Krasne, Duncan Renaldo	United Artists, Inter-American Productions, Inc.	Leo Carrillo, Armida	
Satan's Cradle	1949	The Cisco Kid		Ford Beebe	Philip N. Krasne, Duncan Renaldo	United Artists, Inter-American Productions, Inc.	Leo Carrillo, Ann Savage	
The Girl from San Lorenzo	1950	The Cisco Kid		Derwin Abrahams	Philip N. Krasne	United Artists, Inter-American Productions, Inc.	Leo Carrillo, Jane Adams	
The Capture	1950	Carlos		John Sturges	Niven Busch	RKO Pictures	Lew Ayres, Teresa Wright, Victor Jory	
The Highwayman	1951	—	X	Lesley Selander	Hal E. Chester, Jack Dietz	Monogram Pictures	Wanda Hendrix, Victor Jory, Charles Coburn	
The Lady and the Bandit	1951	—	X	Ralph Murphy	—	Columbia Pictures	Louis Hayward, Patricia Medina	

== See also ==
- Leo Carrillo on stage and screen
