= Leo Carrillo on stage and screen =

Filmography

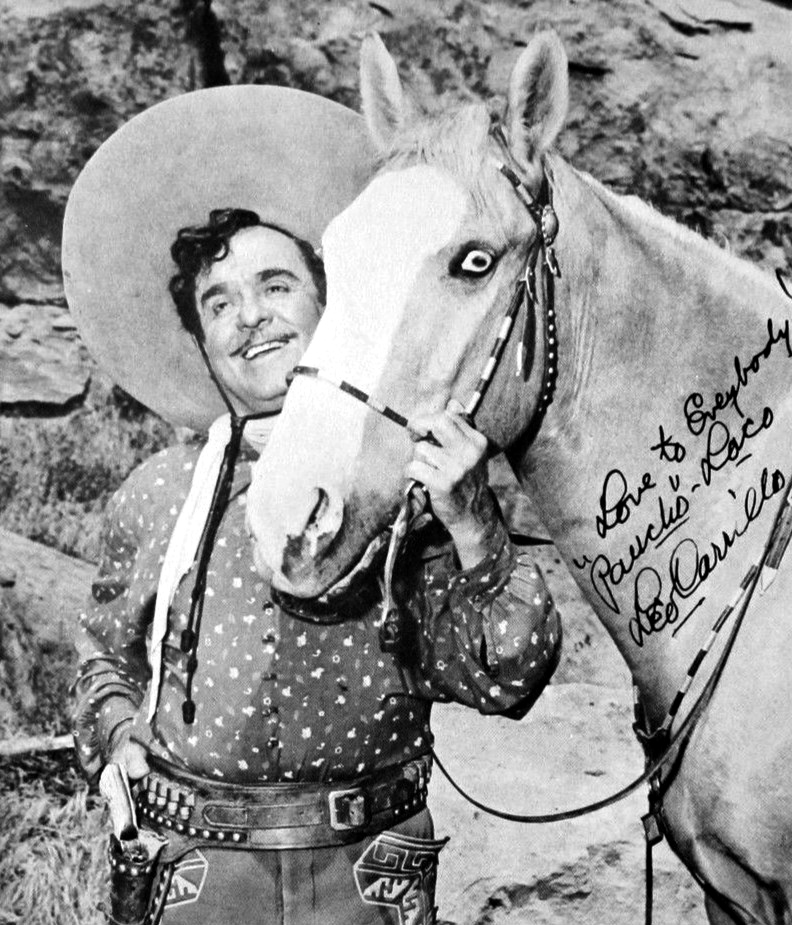
Leo Carrillo as Pancho with his horse Loco from The Cisco Kid

Leo Carrillo (Spanish pronunciation: [Cay-reel-yo] (Note: Carrillo's autobiography phonetically spelled what his family considered the correct Castilian pronunciation: "The name is pronounced "Cay-reel-yo"' with a liquid Castilian double "l". It is not pronounced "Care-reeyo" with the "y" for double "l" as in Mexico. The Mexican adaptation of Spanish is a beautiful variation in itself, but we of Castilian lineage prefer the original liquid sound for the double "l". It is part of our heritage.")) (1881–1961) was an American cartoonist, a comedian in vaudeville, and an actor on stage, film and television. He was best known in the United States as the Cisco Kid's sidekick Pancho on 1950s children's television, a role which capped a long show business career that began decades earlier.

Growing up in culturally diverse Los Angeles, Carrillo was conversant in five languages with a keen ear for dialects. When he went to work for the San Francisco Examiner as a cartoonist, he began performing humorous monologues on the San Francisco stage, easily transforming himself into a variety of personas. Soon he began working in vaudeville with Major Bowes, and toured the Orpheum Circuit with Walter C. Kelly. Theatrical producer Oliver Morosco offered him a role in the original Broadway play Upstairs and Down in 1916, and within a year, he landed the title role in Lombardi, Ltd. For the next decade he performed on the vaudeville circuit in between acting in Broadway productions. A 1927 touring revival production of Lombardi, Ltd., again featured Carrillo in the lead, and began at George M. Cohan's Theatre before going on the road.

Carrillo's first screen appearances were in 1927 Vitaphone shorts. In the early decades of his film career, he was often the starring lead. And while he played many different ethnic roles, or characters with no discernible ethnicity, he was often cast as Italian or Hispanic. He played everything from the hero to the villain, in straight dramatic parts as well as appearing in light comedy and musical films. Over the course of his movie career, Carrillo appeared in over 80 feature-length films, ending in 1950 with Pancho Villa Returns. He was 68 years old when he first teamed with Duncan Renaldo to co-star in five Cisco Kid movies in 1949–1950. The ensuing popular The Cisco Kid television series ran for 156 episodes 1950–1956.

For his contributions to the entertainment industry, Carrillo received two stars on the Hollywood Walk of Fame on February 8, 1960 . The star for his contributions to motion pictures is located at 1635 Vine Street, and the star for his television work is a block away at 1517 Vine Street.

== Stage ==
Broadway credits of Leo Carrillo
Year	Title	Role	Theatre	Notes	Ref(s)
Fads and Fancies	1915	Sir Giovanni Gasolini	Knickerbocker Theatre	Vaudeville skits and monologues	
Upstairs and Down	1916	—	Cort Theatre	Carrillo's play debut	
Lombardi, Ltd.	1917	Tito Lombardi	Morosco Theatre		
Mike Angelo	1923	Mike Angelo	Morosco Theatre		
Magnolia	1923	Tom	Liberty Theatre		
Gypsy Jim	1924	Gypsy Jim	49th Street Theatre		
The Saint	1924	Valdez	Greenwich Village Theatre		
The Padre	1926	Father Pellegrin	Ritz Theatre		
Lombardi, Ltd.	1927	Tito Lombardi	George M. Cohan's Theatre	Touring production went on the road.	

== Television ==
Television credits of Leo Carrillo
Year	Title	Role	Notes	Ref(s)
The Cisco Kid	1950–56	Pancho	156 episodes	
TV Club	1951	Himself	Episode #1.18	
Tournament of Roses Parade	1954	Himself	January 1, 1954	
The Red Skelton Hour	1958	Latin American Dictator	Episode: "Calypso Clem"	
This Is Your Life	1959	Himself	April 15, 1959	
Hollywood Without Make-Up	1963	Himself	Ken Murray home movies of actors	
The Bronze Screen: 100 Years of the Latino Image in Hollywood	2002	Himself (footage)	Documentary	
California's Golden Parks	2007	Himself (footage)	#156, "Leo Carrillo Ranch"	

== Films ==
=== Film shorts ===
Film short credits of Leo Carrillo
Year	Title	Studio/Distributor	Notes	Ref(s)
At the Ball Game	1927	Vitaphone	Vaudeville skit	
The Foreigner	1928	Vitaphone	Vaudeville skit	
The Hellgate of Soisson	1928	Vitaphone	Vaudeville skit	
Running Hollywood	1932	Universal Pictures		
The 42nd. Street Special	1933	Warner Brothers		
Star Night at the Cocoanut Grove	1934	MGM	Master of Ceremonies	
Hollywood on Parade	1934	Paramount Pictures	No. B-8	
A Dream Comes True	1935	Vitaphone	(uncredited)	
La Fiesta de Santa Barbara	1935	MGM		
Things You Never See on the Screen	1935	Warner Brothers	(never released; blooper reel compiled for studio personnel)	
Cinema Circus	1937	Lewis Lewyn Productions		
Screen Snapshots	1938	Columbia Pictures	Series 17, No. 8	
Screen Snapshots	1938	Columbia Pictures	Series 17, No. 9	
Screen Snapshots	1938	Columbia Pictures	Series 18, No. 2	
Screen Snapshots	1939	Columbia Pictures	Series 19, No. 3, Outdoor Parties	
Screen Snapshots	1940	Columbia Pictures	Seeing Hollywood, Rodeo Parade Participant	
Hedda Hopper's Hollywood	1942	Paramount Pictures	No. 4	
Screen Snapshots	1944	Columbia Pictures	Series 24, No. 4, Rodeo Star. With Gloria Jean, Alan Mowbray, Bela Lugosi.	
Screen Snapshots	1945	Columbia Pictures	Series 25, No. 3, Fashions and Rodeo	
Around the World in California	1947	MGM	(uncredited)	
Screen Snapshots	1950	Columbia Pictures	The Great Snowman	
Screen Snapshots	1953	Columbia Pictures	Series 33, No. 4, Hollywood's great entertainers. Gene Nelson, Sid Grauman testimonial dinner, December 24, 1953	

=== Feature and serial films ===
Feature and serial film credits of Leo Carrillo
Title	Year	Role	Director	Producer	Studio/Distributor	Other cast members	Ref(s)
Mister Antonio	1929	Antonio Camaradino	James Flood	—	Tiffany-Stahl Productions, Inc.	Virginia Valli, Gareth Hughes	
The Guilty Generation	1931	Mike Palermo	Rowland V. Lee	—	Columbia Pictures	Constance Cummings, Robert Young, Boris Karloff	
Hell Bound	1931	Nick Cotrelli	Walter Lang	Samuel Zierler	James Cruze Productions, Inc., Tiffany Productions, Inc.	Lloyd Hughes, Ralph Ince	
The Homicide Squad	1931	Big Louie Grenado	George Melford	Carl Laemmle, Carl Laemmle, Jr.	Universal Pictures	Mary Brian, Noah Beery, Sr.	
Lasca of the Rio Grande	1931	Jose Santa Cruz	Edward Laemmle	Carl Laemmle	Universal Pictures	Johnny Mack Brown, Dorothy Burgess	
The Broken Wing	1932	Captain Innocencio	Lloyd Corrigan	—	Paramount Pictures	Lupe Vélez	
Deception	1932	Jim Hurley	Lewis Seiler	Bryan Foy	Columbia Pictures	Dickie Moore	
Girl of the Rio	1932	Don Jose Maria Lopez y Tostado	Herbert Brenon	Merian C. Cooper	RKO Pictures	Dolores del Río	
Men Are Such Fools	1932	Antonio Mello	William Nigh	Joseph I. Schnitzer, Samuel Zierler	RKO Pictures, Jefferson Pictures Corporation	Vivienne Osborne, Una Merkel	
Before Morning	1933	Dr. Gruelle/Mr. Maitland	Arthur Hoerl	Robert Mintz	State Rights, Stage and Screen Productions, Inc.	Lora Baxter, Taylor Holmes	
Moonlight and Pretzels	1933	Nick Pappacropolis	Karl Freund	Carl Laemmle	Universal Pictures	Mary Brian, Herbert Rawlinson	
Obey the Law	1933	Tony Pasqual	Benjamin Stoloff	Bryan Foy	Fox Productions, Columbia Pictures	Dickie Moore, Lois Wilson	
Parachute Jumper	1933	Kurt Weber	Alfred E. Green	—	Warner Bros.	Douglas Fairbanks, Jr., Bette Davis, Frank McHugh, Lyle Talbot	
Racetrack	1933	Joe Tomasso	James Cruze	Samuel Zierler	World Wide Pictures, Inc., Fox Film Corporation, James Cruze Productions, Inc., Tiffany Productions, Inc.	Junior Coghlan, Kay Hammond	
The Band Plays On	1934	Angelo	Russell Mack	Ned Marin	MGM	Robert Young, Stu Erwin	
Four Frightened People	1934	Montague	Cecil B. DeMille	Emanuel Cohen	Paramount Pictures	Claudette Colbert, Herbert Marshall, Mary Boland, William Gargan	
The Gay Bride	1934	Mickey the Greek/John Mickapopolis	Jack Conway	John W. Considine Jr.	MGM	Carole Lombard, Chester Morris	
Manhattan Melodrama	1934	Father Joe	W. S. Van Dyke	David O. Selznick	MGM	Clark Gable, William Powell, Myrna Loy	
Viva Villa!	1934	Sierra	Jack Conway	David O. Selznick	MGM	Wallace Beery, Faye Wray	
If You Could Only Cook	1935	Mike Rossini	William A. Seiter	Everett Riskin	Columbia Pictures	Herbert Marshall, Jean Arthur	
In Caliente	1935	Jose Gomez	Lloyd Bacon	Edward Chodorov	Warner Bros.	Dolores del Río, Pat O'Brien, Glenda Farrell, Edward Everett Horton	
Love Me Forever	1935	Steve Corelli	Victor Schertzinger	Max Winslow	Columbia Pictures	Grace Moore	
The Winning Ticket	1935	Joe Tomasello	Charles Reisner	Jack Cummings	MGM	Ted Healy, Louise Fazenda	
The Gay Desperado	1936	Braganza	Rouben Mamoulian	Mary Pickford, Jesse Lasky	United Artists	Ida Lupino, Nino Martini	
It Had to Happen	1936	Giuseppe Badjagaloupe	Roy Del Ruth	Darryl F. Zanuck	20th Century Fox	Rosalind Russell, George Raft	
Moonlight Murder	1936	Gino D'Acosta	Edwin L. Marin	Lucian Hubbard, Ned Marin	MGM	Duncan Renaldo, Chester Morris	
52d Street	1937	Fiorello Zamarelli	Harold Young	Walter Wanger	United Artists	Ian Hunter, ZaSu Pitts, Dorothy Peterson	
The Barrier	1937	Poleon/Doret	Lesley Selander	Adolph Zukor, Harry Sherman	Paramount Pictures	Jean Parker, Otto Kruger	
History Is Made at Night	1937	Cesare	Frank Borzage	Walter Wanger	United Artists	Charles Boyer, Colin Clive, Jean Arthur	
Hotel Haywire	1937	Dr. Zodiac Z. Zippe	George Archainbaud	Adolph Zukor, Paul Jones, William LeBaron	Paramount Pictures	Franklin Pangborn, Spring Byington, Lynne Overman	
I Promise to Pay	1937	Richard Farra	D. Ross Lederman	Myles Connolly	Columbia Pictures	Chester Morris, Helen Mack	
Manhattan Merry-Go-Round	1937	Tony Gordoni	Charles Reisner	Harry Sauber	Republic Pictures	Ann Dvorak, Ted Lewis, Cab Calloway, Louis Prima, Gene Autry	
Blockade	1938	Luis	William Dieterle	Walter Wanger	United Artists	Madeleine Carroll, Henry Fonda, John Halliday, Reginald Denny	
City Streets	1938	Joe Carmine	Albert S. Rogell	Wallace MacDonald	Columbia Pictures	Edith Fellows	
Flirting with Fate	1938	Sancho Ramirez	Frank McDonald	David L. Loew	David L. Loew Productions, Loew's Inc.	Joe E. Brown, Jay Novello, Beverly Roberts	
The Girl of the Golden West	1938	Mosquito	Robert Z. Leonard	William Anthony McGuire	MGM	Jeanette MacDonald, Nelson Eddy, Walter Pidgeon	
Little Miss Roughneck	1938	Pascual Orozco	Aubrey Scotto	Irving Briskin	Columbia Pictures	Edith Fellows	
Too Hot to Handle	1938	Joselito "José" Estanza	Jack Conway	Lawrence Weingarten	MGM	Clark Gable, Myrna Loy, Walter Pidgeon	
The Arizona Wildcat	1939	Manuel Hernandez	Herbert I. Leeds	John Stone	20th Century Fox	Jane Withers	
Chicken Wagon Family	1939	Jean Paul Batiste Fippany	Herbert I. Leeds	Sol M. Wurtzel	20th Century Fox	Jane Withers	
Fisherman's Wharf	1939	Carlo Roma	Bernard Vorhaus	Sol Lesser	RKO Pictures	Bobby Breen	
The Girl and the Gambler	1939	El Rayo	Lew Landers	Cliff Reid	RKO Radio Pictures	Tim Holt	
Rio	1939	Roberto	John Brahm	—	Universal Pictures	Basil Rathbone, Victor McLaglen	
Society Lawyer	1939	Tony Gazotti	Edwin L. Marin	John W. Considine Jr., Louis D. Lighton	MGM	Walter Pidgeon	
20 Mule Team	1940	Piute Pete	Richard Thorpe	J. Walter Ruben	MGM	Wallace Beery, Marjorie Rambeau, Anne Baxter, Noah Beery, Jr.	
Captain Caution	1940	Lucien Argandeau	Richard Wallace	Hal Roach	Hal Roach Productions, United Artists	Victor Mature, Bruce Cabot, Alan Ladd	
Lillian Russell	1940	Tony Pastor	Irving Cummings	Darryl F. Zanuck	20th Century Fox	Alice Faye, Don Ameche, Henry Fonda, Edward Arnold	
One Night in the Tropics	1940	Escobar	A. Edward Sutherland	Leonard Spigelgass	Universal Pictures	Bud Abbott, Lou Costello, William Frawley, Robert Cummings	
Wyoming	1940	Pete Marillo	Richard Thorpe	Milton H. Bren	MGM	Wallace Beery, Ann Rutherford	
Barnacle Bill	1941	Pico Rodriguez	Richard Thorpe	Milton H. Bren	MGM	Wallace Beery, Marjorie Main	
Honolulu Lu	1941	Don Estaban Cordoba	Charles Barton	Wallace MacDonald, Irving Briskin	Columbia Pictures	Lupe Vélez	
Horror Island	1941	Tobias Clump	George Waggner	Jack Bernard	Universal Studios	Dick Foran, Peggy Moran, Foy Van Dolsen	
The Kid from Kansas	1941	Juan Garcia Pancho	William Nigh	Ben Pivar	Universal Pictures	Dick Foran, Andy Devine	
Riders of Death Valley (15-chapter serial)	1941	Pancho	Charles Lamont	Ben Pivar	Universal Pictures	Dick Foran, Andy Devine	
Tight Shoes	1941	Amalfi	Albert S. Rogell	Jules Levey	Universal Pictures	Binnie Barnes, Broderick Crawford	
American Empire	1942	Dominique Beauchard	William C. McGann	Lewis J. Rachmil, Harry Sherman, Dick Dickson	United Artists	Richard Dix, Jack La Rue, William Farnum	
Danger in the Pacific	1942	Leo Marzell	Lewis D. Collins	Ben Pivar	Universal Pictures	Andy Devine, Turhan Bey	
Escape from Hong Kong	1942	Pancho	William Nigh	Marshall Grant	Universal Pictures	Andy Devine, Marjorie Lord	
Men of Texas	1942	Sam Sawyer	Ray Enright	George Waggner	Universal Pictures	Broderick Crawford, Robert Stack, Jackie Cooper	
Sin Town	1942	Anjelo Colina	Ray Enright	George Waggner	Universal Pictures	Constance Bennett, Broderick Crawford, Patric Knowles, Anne Gwynne	
Timber	1942	Quebec	Christy Cabanne	Ben Pivar	Universal Pictures	Andy Devine, Marjorie Lord	
Top Sergeant	1942	Corporal Frenchy Devereaux	Christy Cabanne	Ben Pivar	Universal Pictures	Andy Devine, Don Terry, Don Porter, Alan Hale, Jr.	
Unseen Enemy	1942	Nick	John Rawlins	Marshall Grant	Universal Pictures	Irene Hervey, Turhan Bey, Hugh Beaumont	
What's Cookin'?	1942	Marvo the Great	Edward F. Cline	Ken Goldsmith	Universal Pictures	Billie Burke, Donald O'Connor, The Andrews Sisters	
Crazy House	1943	—	Edward F. Cline	Milton Feld	Universal Pictures	Ole Olsen, Chic Johnson, Hans Conreid	
Follow the Band	1943	—	Jean Yarbrough	Paul Malvern	Universal Pictures	Eddie Quillan, Mary Beth Hughes, Leon Errol, Robert Mitchum, Hilo Hattie, Frances Langford	
Frontier Badmen	1943	Chinito	Ford Beebe	Howard Benedict, Ford Beebe	Universal Pictures	Anne Gwynne, Noah Beery Jr., Thomas Gomez	
Larceny with Music	1943	Gus Borelli	Edward Lilley	Howard Benedict	Universal Pictures	Kitty Carlisle, Lee Patrick, William Frawley	
Phantom of the Opera	1943	Signor Ferretti	Arthur Lubin	George Waggner	Universal Pictures	Nelson Eddy, Susanna Foster, Claude Rains, Hume Cronyn	
Moonlight and Cactus	1944	Pasqualito	Edward F. Cline	Frank Gross	Universal Pictures	The Andrews Sisters, Shemp Howard	
Bowery to Broadway	1944	P.J. Fenton	Charles Lamont	John Grant, Milton Feld	Universal Pictures	Maria Montez, Jack Oakie, Susanna Foster	
Ghost Catchers	1944	Jerry	Edward F. Cline	Milton Feld, Edmund L. Hartmann	Universal Pictures	Ole Olsen, Chic Johnson, Gloria Jean, Andy Devine	
Gypsy Wildcat	1944	Anube	Roy William Neil	George Waggner, Jack Gross	Universal Pictures	Maria Montez, Jon Hall, Nigel Bruce, Gale Sondergaard	
Crime, Inc.	1945	Tony Marlow	Lew Landers	Leon Fromkess, Martin Mooney	Producers Releasing Corporation	Lionel Atwill, Martha Tilton, Tom Neal	
Mexicana	1945	Esteban Guzman	Alfred Santell	Alfred Santell	Republic Pictures	Tito Guízar, Constance Moore, Estelita Rodriguez	
Under Western Skies	1945	King Carlos Randall	Jean Yarbrough	Joseph Gershenson, Warren Wilson	Universal Pictures	Noah Beery, Jr., Martha O'Driscoll	
The Fugitive	1947	Chief of police	John Ford	Merian C. Cooper, Emilio Fernández, John Ford	Argosy Pictures, RKO Pictures	Henry Fonda, Dolores del Río, Pedro Armendáriz	
The Daring Caballero	1949	Pancho	Wallace Fox	Philip N. Krasne, Duncan Renaldo	United Artists, Inter-American Productions, Inc.	Duncan Renaldo, Kippee Valez	
The Gay Amigo	1949	Pancho	Wallace Fox	Philip N. Krasne, Duncan Renaldo	United Artists, Inter-American Productions, Inc.	Duncan Renaldo, Armida	
Satan's Cradle	1949	Pancho	Ford Beebe	Philip N. Krasne, Duncan Renaldo	United Artists, Inter-American Productions, Inc.	Duncan Renaldo, Ann Savage	
The Valiant Hombre	1949	Pancho	Wallace Fox	Philip N. Krasne, Duncan Renaldo	United Artists, Inter-American Productions, Inc.	Duncan Renaldo, John Litel	
The Girl from San Lorenzo	1950	Pancho	Derwin Abrahams	Philip N. Krasne	United Artists, Inter-American Productions, Inc.	Duncan Renaldo, Jane Adams	
Pancho Villa Returns	1950	Pancho Villa	Miguel Contreras Torres	Hispanic Continental Films Inc.	Hispanic Continental Films Inc.	Rodolfo Acosta, Esther Fernández	

== See also ==
- The Cisco Kid
- Duncan Renaldo filmography

== Notes ==
=== References ===
- Baugh, Scott L. (2012). Latino American Cinema: An Encyclopedia of Movies, Stars, Concepts, and Trends. Santa Barbara, CA: Greenwood Publishing Group. ISBN 978-0-313-38036-5.
- Bordman, Gerald (1995). American Theatre: A Chronicle of Comedy and Drama 1914–1930. New York, NY: Oxford University Press. ISBN 978-0-19-509078-9.
- Bordman, Gerald; Hischak, Thomas S. (2004). The Oxford Companion to American Theatre. New York, NY: Oxford University Press. ISBN 978-0-19-516986-7.
- Bradley, Edwin M. (2005). The First Hollywood Sound Shorts, 1926–1931. Jefferson, NC: McFarland & Company. ISBN 978-0-7864-4319-2.
- Brooks, Patricia; Brooks, Jonathan (2006). Laid to Rest in California: A Guide to the Cemeteries and Grave Sites of the Rich and Famous. Guilford, CT: Globe Pequot Press. ISBN 978-0-7627-4101-4.
- Brooks, Tim; Marsh, Earle (2007). The Complete Directory to Prime Time Network and Cable TV Shows, 1946–Present. New York, NY: Ballantine Books. ISBN 978-0-345-49773-4.
- Carrillo, Leo (1961). The California I Love. Englewood Cliffs, NJ: Prentice Hall. OCLC 657077014.
- Cullen, Frank; Hackman, Florence; McNeilly, Donald (2007). Vaudeville, Old & New : An Encyclopedia of Variety Performers in America. New York, NY: Routledge. ISBN 978-0-415-93853-2.
- Drew, Bernard A. (2014). Motion Picture Series and Sequels: A Reference Guide. New York, NY: Routledge. ISBN 978-0-415-72665-8.
- Durham, Weldon B. (1987). American Theatre Companies, 1888-1930. West Westport, CT: Greenwood Press. ISBN 0-313-25359-5.
- Hirschak, Thomas S. (2009). Broadway Plays and Musicals: Descriptions and Essential Facts of More Than 14,000 Shows through 2007. Jefferson, NC: McFarland & Company. ISBN 978-0-7864-3448-0.
- Liebman, Roy (2010). Vitaphone Films A Catalogue of the Features and Shorts. McFarland & Company. ISBN 978-0-7864-4697-1.
- Monush, Barry (2003). Encyclopedia of Hollywood Film Actors, Vol. 1: From the Silent Era to 1965. Milwaukee, WI: Hal Leonard Corporation. ISBN 978-1-55783-551-2.
- Pitts, Michael R. (2012). Western Movies: A Guide, A Guide to 5,105 Feature Films. Jefferson, NC: McFarland & Company. ISBN 978-0-7864-6372-5.
- Slide, Anthony (2012). The Encyclopedia of Vaudeville. Jackson, MS: University Press of Mississippi. ISBN 978-1-61703-250-9.
