= Call of the Jungle =

1944 film by Phil Rosen

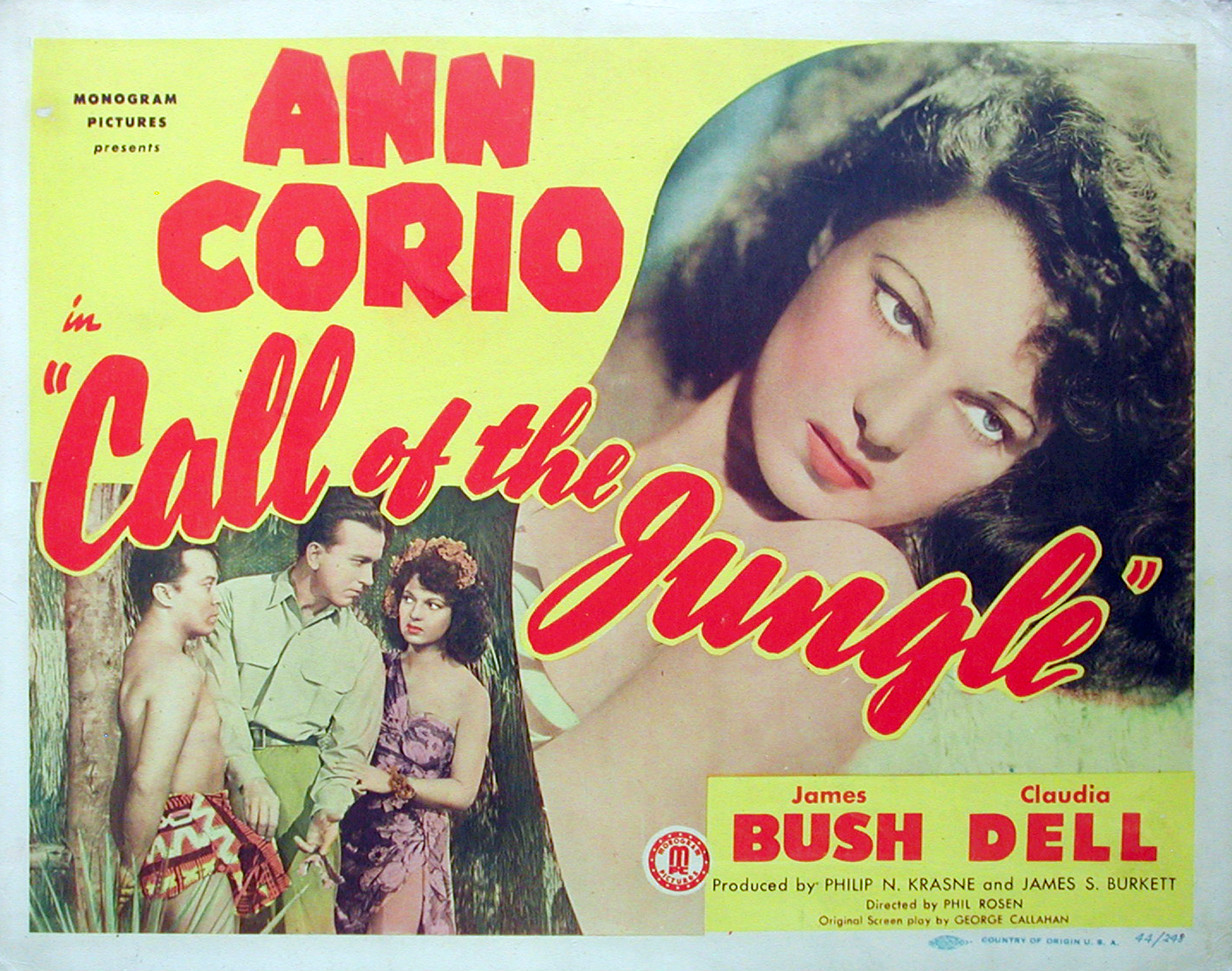
- Call of the Jungle lobby card
- Directed by: Phil Rosen
- Produced by: Philip N. Krasne; James S. Burkett
- Starring: Ann Corio; James Bush; John Davidson; Claudia Dell
- Production company: Monogram Pictures
- Release date: 1944
- Running time: 60 minutes
- Country: United States
- Language: English

Call of the Jungle is a 1944 adventure mystery film directed by Phil Rosen. It stars Ann Corio, James Bush and John Davidson.

== Plot ==
After sacred pearls are stolen from an island temple, Tana starts investigating to find the culprit, only to end up on the police's suspect list. Jim, a police officer, is hurt while investigating the theft. Tana helps nurse Jim back to health, and they decide to come together to find the thief.

== Cast ==
- Ann Corio as Tana
- James Bush as Jim
- John Davidson as Harley
- Claudia Dell as Gracie
- Eddy Chandler as Boggs (credited as Edward Chandler)
- Muni Seroff as Louie
- I. Stanford Jolley as Carlton
- Alex Havier as Malu (credited as J. Alex Havier)
- Philip Van Zandt as Dozan (credited as Phil Van Zandt)
- Harry Burns as Kahuna
- Jay Silverheels as Native (uncredited)

== See also ==
- List of American films of 1944
