= The Sultan's Daughter =

1943 film directed by Arthur Dreifuss

- Theatrical release poster
- Directed by: Arthur Dreifuss
- Screenplay by: Milton Raison; Tim Ryan
- Produced by: Philip N. Krasne; James S. Burkett
- Starring: Ann Corio; Charles Butterworth; Tim Ryan; Irene Ryan; Edward Norris; Fortunio Bonanova
- Cinematography: John Alton
- Edited by: Martin G. Cohn; Richard C. Currier
- Music by: Karl Hajos
- Production company: Monogram Pictures
- Distributed by: Monogram Pictures
- Release date: December 16, 1943
- Running time: 64 minutes
- Country: United States
- Language: English

The Sultan's Daughter is a 1943 American comedy film directed by Arthur Dreifuss and written by Milton Raison and Tim Ryan. The film stars Ann Corio, Charles Butterworth, Tim Ryan, Irene Ryan, Edward Norris and Fortunio Bonanova. The film was released on December 16, 1943, by Monogram Pictures.

== Plot ==
American entertainers Jimmy and Tim find themselves stranded in the Middle Eastern kingdom of Araband. Hoping to strike it rich, they become entangled in palace politics when they meet Patra, the beautiful and headstrong daughter of the Sultan, who has just inherited her late mother's—and later her father's—vast oil-rich lands. Patra insists that these valuable resources be leased only to Americans, putting her at odds with Axis-aligned agents Rata and Ludwig, who aim to seize control of the oil for their own ends. Kuda, the Sultan’s trusted advisor and a secret ally of the Germans, seeks to marry Patra and manipulates Jimmy and Tim into persuading her to sign over the leases—without revealing his true intentions. Patra, aided by her American friend and teacher Irene, skillfully navigates the growing danger while developing a romantic connection that strengthens her resolve. More cunning than her adversaries anticipated, Patra uses charm, wit, and support from her newfound allies to outsmart the villains, secure her inheritance, and ensure the oil lands remain in safe hands.

== Cast ==
- Ann Corio as Patra
- Charles Butterworth as Sultan of Araband
- Tim Ryan as Tim
- Irene Ryan as Irene
- Edward Norris as Jimmy
- Fortunio Bonanova as Kuda
- Jack La Rue as Rata
- Gene Roth as Ludwig
- Chris-Pin Martin as Merchant
- Joseph J. Greene as Benson
- Freddie Fisher as Orchestra Leader
