= Charlie Chan in the Secret Service =

1944 film by Phil Rosen

- Directed by: Phil Rosen
- Written by: Earl Derr Biggers (characters); George Callahan (screenplay)
- Produced by: Phillip N. Krasne; James S. Burkett
- Starring: Sidney Toler; Mantan Moreland; Arthur Loft
- Cinematography: Ira H. Morgan
- Edited by: Martin G. Cohn
- Music by: Karl Hajos
- Production company: Monogram Pictures
- Distributed by: Monogram Pictures
- Release date: February 14, 1944
- Running time: 63 minutes
- Country: United States
- Language: English
- Budget: $75,000

Charlie Chan in the Secret Service is a 1944 mystery film starring Sidney Toler as Charlie Chan. It is the first Chan film made by Monogram Pictures after the series was dropped by 20th Century-Fox, and it marks the introduction of Number Three Son (Benson Fong) and taxi driver (later Chan's chauffeur), Birmingham Brown (Mantan Moreland).

== Plot ==
Charlie Chan is now an agent of the U.S. government working in Washington D.C., and he is assigned to investigate the murder of the inventor of a highly advanced torpedo. Aiding Chan is his overeager but dull-witted Number Three son Tommy (Benson Fong) and his Number Two Daughter Iris Chan (Marianne Quon). Also involved in the case is the bumbling and easily frightened Birmingham Brown (Mantan Moreland), who works as a taxi driver.

== Cast ==
- Sidney Toler as Charlie Chan
- Mantan Moreland as Birmingham Brown, Taxi Driver
- Arthur Loft as Inspector Jones, Secret Service
- Gwen Kenyon as Inez Arranto
- Sarah Edwards as Mrs. Hargue, Housekeeper
- George J. Lewis as Paul Arranto (as George Lewis)
- Marianne Quon as Iris Chan
- Benson Fong as Tommy Chan
- Muni Seroff as Peter Laska
- Barry Bernard as David Blake
- Gene Roth as Luis Philipe Vega aka Von Vegon (as Gene Stutenroth)
- Eddy Chandler as Lewis, Secret Service (as Eddie Chandler)
- Lelah Tyler as Mrs. Williams

== Production ==
20th Century-Fox stopped making Charlie Chan films in 1942. The wartime collapse of the international film market may have been a factor, but the main reason was that Fox was curtailing virtually all of its low-budget series. Fox's other "B" series — Jane Withers, Michael Shayne, and The Cisco Kid — also ended that year. Only Laurel and Hardy remained in Fox's "B" unit, until it shut down at the end of 1944.

Sidney Toler bought the screen rights to the Charlie Chan character from Eleanor Biggers Cole, the widow of Chan's creator, Earl Derr Biggers. Toler hoped that if he could find someone to produce new Charlie Chan films, starring himself, Fox would distribute them. Fox declined, having already dropped the series, but Toler sold the idea to Monogram Pictures, an independent, lower-budgeted film studio. Philip N. Krasne, a Hollywood lawyer who invested in film productions, partnered with James S. Burkett to produce the Monogram Chans.

In June 1943 Monogram announced that Charlie Chan and the Secret Service would be one of 24 movies and 16 Westerns the studio would make over the following year. This was eight less than the previous year as Monogram wanted to make "fewer and higher budgeted pictures". The film was to star Sidney Toler and Victor Sen Yung from the Fox movies.

Sen Yung joined the U.S. Army Air Forces just as Toler was set to revive the dormant Chan series. According to author James L. Neibaur, Sen Yung's military obligations forced him to decline rejoining the series immediately, but Monogram gave him a standing invitation to work there when his tour of duty was up. He was temporarily replaced in the Charlie Chan series by Benson Fong, who played "number three son" Tommy Chan. The new film would also feature Charlie Chan's daughter as one of the principals. Iris Wong from the Fox series was announced, but replaced by Marianne Quon. Filming started September 10, 1943.

== Reception ==
Although Monogram made the film for about one-third the budget that Fox had spent, trade reviewers applauded the return of Charlie Chan and thought the Monogram effort was up to the old standard. Showmen's Trade Review: "They still manage to entertain, for Charlie Chan in the Secret Service, the first under the Monogram banner, is no exception; it is a pleasing mystery that will be welcomed wherever this screen sleuth proved popular before." Thalia Bell of Motion Picture Daily called the film "a well-tailored job cut to the pattern of its predecessors." Film Daily said it "ranks with the best in the series. This release is first-rate mystery for the whodunit fans, and audiences generally should like the picture." Sara Hamilton of Photoplay greeted the return of the series puckishly: "Good old Charlie Chan (remember the Chinese detective of yesteryear?) is back again, in Washington this time. Your reviewer says: Muchee goodee, Cholly old boy!"

== See also ==
- List of American films of 1944
