= Mister Antonio =

1929 film by James Flood

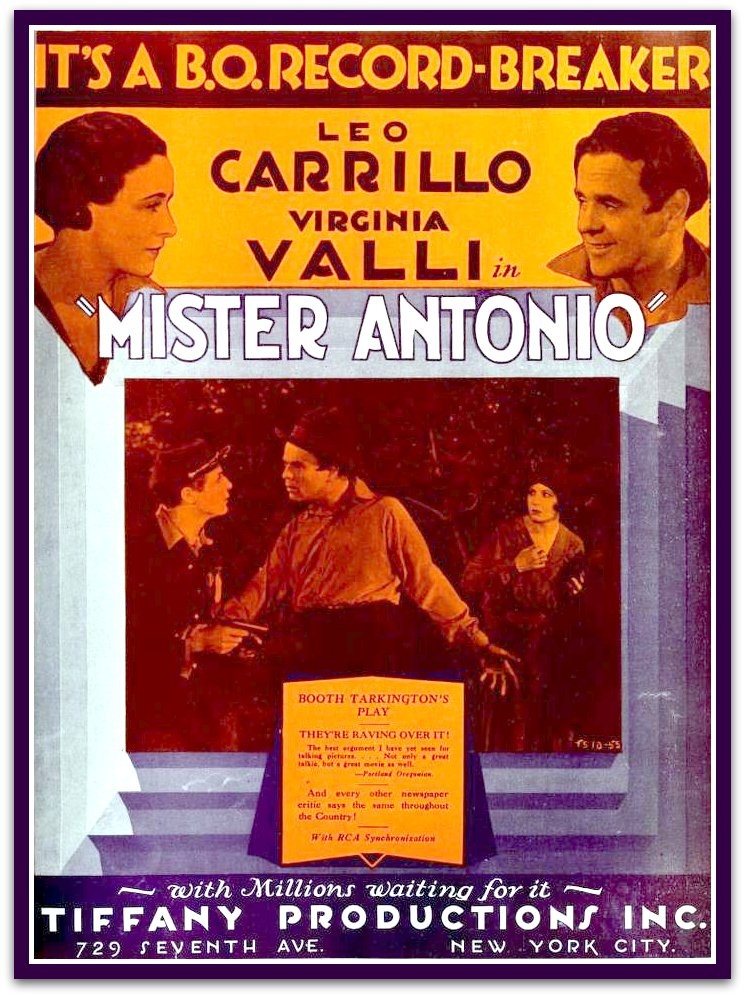
- Directed by: James Flood, Frank Reicher
- Written by: Fanny Hatton, Frederick Hatton
- Based on: Mister Antonio by Booth Tarkington
- Produced by: John M. Stahl
- Starring: Leo Carrillo, Virginia Valli
- Cinematography: Ernest Miller
- Distributed by: Tiffany Pictures
- Release date: October 15, 1929
- Running time: 73 minutes
- Country: United States
- Language: English

Mister Antonio is a 1929 American romantic comedy film directed by Frank Reicher and James Flood that is based on a 1916 Booth Tarkington Broadway play of the same name. Leo Carrillo stars in the title role of Antonio Camaradino, originated on Broadway by Otis Skinner, as a hurdy-gurdy street artist who falls in love with the relative of a robbery victim he has rescued.

== Cast ==
The film

- Leo Carrillo as Antonio Camaradino
- Virginia Valli as June Ramsey
- Gareth Hughes as Joe
- Frank Reicher as Milton Jorny
- Eugenie Besserer as Mrs. Jorny

== Preservation ==
A print of Mister Antonio is preserved in the Library of Congress collection.

== See also ==
- List of early sound feature films (1926–1929)
