= The Deadly Game (1941 film) =

1941 film by Phil Rosen

- Directed by: Phil Rosen
- Written by: Wellyn Totman
- Produced by: Dixon R. Harwin
- Starring: Charles Farrell; June Lang; John Miljan
- Cinematography: Arthur Martinelli
- Edited by: Martin G. Cohn
- Music by: Ross DiMaggio
- Production company: Monogram Pictures
- Distributed by: Monogram Pictures
- Release date: August 8, 1941
- Running time: 63 minutes
- Country: United States
- Language: English

The Deadly Game is a 1941 American thriller film directed by Phil Rosen and starring Charles Farrell, June Lang and John Miljan. The film was produced and distributed by Monogram Pictures. It was Farrell's 53rd and final film appearance, although he would reemerge more than a decade later on television as the lead in My Little Margie.

== Cast ==
- Charles Farrell as Barry Scott
- June Lang as Christine Reisner
- John Miljan as Henri Franck
- Bernadene Hayes as Mona Brandt
- J. Arthur Young as Dr. Reisner
- David Clarke as John Brandt
- Dave O'Brien as Ralph Spencer
- Charles Sargent as American Agent
- John Dilson as Harkness
- Tom Herbert as FBI Agent
- Ottola Nesmith as Nazi Wife
- Frederick Giermann as Carl Nash
- Hans von Morhart as Fritz
- Walter Bonn as Nazi Agent
- Wilhelm von Brincken as Nazi Agent
- John Harmon as Henchman
- Byron Foulger as Motel Manager
- Kurt Kreuger as Lieutenant
- Kenne Duncan as Henchman
- Jack Gardner as Henchman
- Harold Daniels as FBI Agent

== Bibliography ==
- Fetrow, Alan G. Feature Films, 1940-1949: a United States Filmography. McFarland, 1994.
- Parish, James Robert. Hollywood's Great Love Teams. Arlington House Publishers, 1974.
