= Swamp Woman =

1941 film by Elmer Clifton

- Directed by: Elmer Clifton
- Written by: George Arthur Durlam; Fred McConnell
- Produced by: Max Alexander; George R. Batcheller; George M. Merrick; Alfred Stern
- Starring: Ann Corio; Jack La Rue; Ian MacDonald
- Cinematography: Edward Linden
- Edited by: Charles Henkel Jr.
- Production company: Merrick-Alexander Productions
- Distributed by: Producers Releasing Corporation
- Release date: December 5, 1941
- Running time: 68 minutes
- Country: United States
- Language: English

Swamp Woman is a 1941 American drama film directed by Elmer Clifton and starring Ann Corio, Jack La Rue and Ian MacDonald. It was made as an independent production and distributed by Producers Releasing Corporation.

== Synopsis ==
The movie depicts the journey of three individuals rushing through the vast swamplands. These include honky-tonk dancer Annabelle Tollington, the opportunistic promoter "Flash" Bland, who is after Annabelle, and Jeff Carter, a fugitive trying to evade the police lieutenant's tracking dogs. After escaping the law, Jeff reaches the cabin of Lizbet Tollington, Annabelle's niece, and the fiancée of trapper Pete Oliver, who is Annabelle's former lover. To avoid detection, Lizbet conceals Jeff from the law. Meanwhile, Annabelle informs Pete that Lizbet is sheltering a man in her cabin to break their engagement, which infuriates Pete. However, after realizing Lizbet's love for Jeff, Pete agrees to aid the fugitive. When Rance finally arrives, he identifies Annabelle as the legendary "Swamp Woman".

== Cast ==
- Ann Corio as Annabelle Tollington
- Jack La Rue as Pierre Pertinax Pontineau Briand Broussicourt d'Olivier, aka Pete Oliver
- Mary Hull as Lizbet Tollington
- Ian MacDonald as Det. Lt. Rance
- Jay Novello as 'Flash' Brand
- Richard Deane as Jeff Carter
- Lois Austin as Mary Tollington
- Earl Gunn as Jed Tollington
- Guy Wilkerson as Abner Enderberry
- Jimmy Aubrey as Tod Appleby
- Carlin Sturtevant as Granny Grundy
- Ernie Adams as Spratt
- Frank Hagney as Guard

== Bibliography ==
- Campbell, Edward D.C. The Celluloid South: Hollywood and the Southern Myth. University of Tennessee Press, 2003.
- Fetrow, Alan G. Feature Films, 1940-1949: a United States Filmography. McFarland, 1994.
- Okuda, Ted. Grand National, Producers Releasing Corporation, and Screen Guild/Lippert: Complete Filmographies with Studio Histories. cFarland & Company, 1989.
