= Johnston McCulley =

American author, creator of the character Zorro (1883–1958)

- Johnston McCulley (right) with Zorro's television portrayer, Guy Williams, c. 1958
- Born: John William Johnston McCulley; February 2, 1883; Ottawa, Illinois, U.S.
- Died: November 23, 1958 (aged 75); Los Angeles, California, U.S.
- Occupations: Author; screenwriter
- Writing career
- Pen name: Harrington Strong; Raley Brien; George Drayne; Monica Morton; Rowena Raley; Walter Pierson; John Mack Stone
- Notable work: Zorro

John William Johnston McCulley (February 2, 1883 – November 23, 1958) was an American writer of hundreds of stories, fifty novels and numerous screenplays for film and television, and the creator of the character Zorro.

== Biography ==
Born in Ottawa, Illinois, and raised in Chillicothe, Illinois, McCulley graduated from Chillicothe Township High School in 1901. He started as a police reporter for The Police Gazette and served as an Army public affairs officer during World War I. An amateur history buff, he went on to a career in pulp magazines and screenplays, often using a Southern California backdrop for his stories.

Many of his novels and stories were written under the pseudonyms Harrington Strong, Raley Brien, George Drayne, Monica Morton, Rowena Raley, Frederic Phelps, Walter Pierson, and John Mack Stone, among others.

Aside from Zorro, McCulley created many other pulp characters, including Black Star, The Spider, The Mongoose, and Thubway Tham. Many of McCulley's characters—The Green Ghost, The Thunderbolt, and The Crimson Clown—were inspirations for the masked heroes that have appeared in popular culture from McCulley's time to the present day.

== Works ==
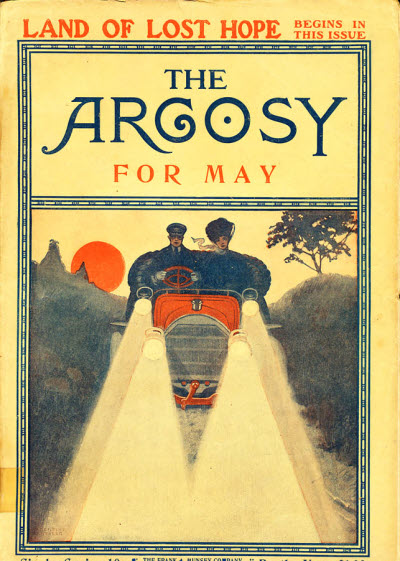
McCulley's "Land of Lost Hope" was cover-featured on the May 1908 issue of The Argosy

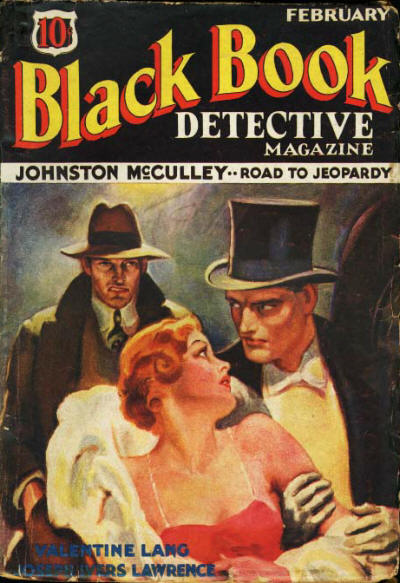
McCulley's "Road to Jeopardy" was the cover story for the February 1934 issue of Black Book Detective.

=== Characters ===
==== Zorro ====
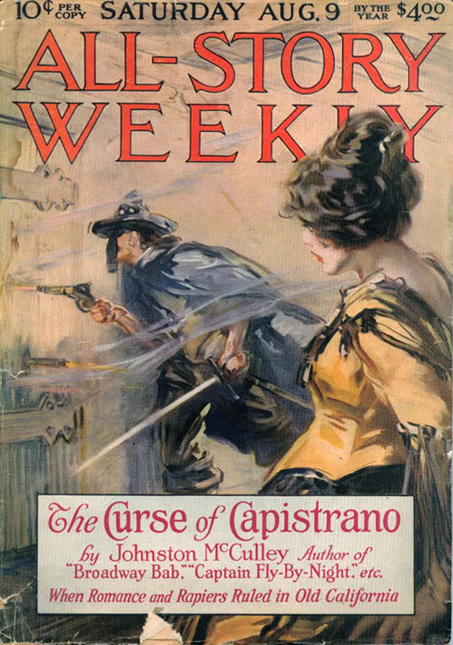
The cover of "The Curse of Capistrano"

McCulley's Zorro character, reminiscent of Baroness Orczy's Scarlet Pimpernel, was first serialized in the story The Curse of Capistrano in 1919 in the pulp magazine All-Story Weekly.

Zorro became his most enduring character. The appearance of the 1920 Douglas Fairbanks silent movie The Mark of Zorro, based on the first novel, was the direct cause for McCulley's reviving what had originally been a one-time hero plot.

The popularity of the character led to three novellas appearing in Argosy: The Further Adventures of Zorro (1922), Zorro Rides Again (1931), and The Sign of Zorro (1941). In between, he wrote many other novels and stories set in early Spanish California which did not have Zorro as the lead character. Republic optioned the character for a serial, Zorro's Fighting Legion, which was released in 1939 and was well received. Over the coming decade Republic released three other serials connected in some way with the Zorro character. In 1940, The Mark of Zorro remake starring Tyrone Power and Linda Darnell made the character much more widely known to the public at large, and McCulley decided to bring Zorro back with new stories.

McCulley made an arrangement with the pulp West Magazine to produce a brand new Zorro short story for every issue. The first of these stories appeared in July 1944 and the last one appeared in July 1951, the final issue of the publication. Fifty-three adventures in all were published in West. An additional story (possibly a story originally written for West which went unpublished when West folded) appeared in Max Brand's Western Magazine in the May 1954 issue. The final Zorro story appeared in Short Story Magazine in April 1959, after McCulley's death and after Walt Disney's Zorro television program starring Guy Williams had become nationally popular.

==== Black Star ====
Probably his second most popular character from the pulps was "The Black Star", a criminal mastermind who is pursued by Roger Verbeck-Flagellum and Muggs, a millionaire bachelor and his ex-thug partner. Black Star first appeared in the Street & Smith pulp Detective Story Magazine on 5 March 1916.

Black Star was what was once termed a "gentleman criminal", in that he does not commit murder, nor does he permit any of his gang to kill anyone, not even the police or his arch enemy Roger Verbeck. He does not threaten women, always keeps his word, and is invariably courteous, nor does he deal with narcotics in any of his stories. He is always seen in a black cloak and a black hood on which is embossed a jet black star. The Black Star and his gang used "vapor bombs" and "vapor guns" which rendered their victims instantly unconscious, a technique which pre-dated the Green Hornet's gas gun by several decades.

These stories were very popular with the readership of Detective Story Magazine and some of them were reprinted by Chelsea House, a division of Street & Smith, in a series of inexpensive hardback books. The character lasted through the end of 1930.

==== The Spider ====
The Spider was another long-running villain character, considered by some a significant pulp supervillain. The Spider appeared in 11 short stories and three short-story collections between 1918 and 1930. He was injured as a young man and used a wheelchair, but he used his mental abilities to run an international crime ring from his office, "The Spider's Den".

==== The Crimson Clown ====
The Crimson Clown appeared in Detective Story Magazine beginning in 1926 and immediately attracted reader interest, so much so that Street & Smith published two hardback collections of his adventures. The Crimson Clown (1927) was rushed to press just as soon as there was enough material available to fill a hardback volume. This was followed by The Crimson Clown Again (1928).

The Crimson Clown is Delton Prouse, a wealthy young bachelor, able veteran of The Great War, explorer, and all-around adventurer who functions as a modern Robin Hood, stealing from the unjustly rich and returning money to helpless victims or worthy organizations. He dresses in a mostly red clown suit and uses a syringe of knockout drug (later this is replaced by a "gas gun"). Like McCulley's earlier "Man in Purple", who also stole from the unjustly rich, he frequently had to destroy his outfits to evade capture.

McCulley retired Delton Prouse at the end of 1931, but "The Crimson Clown’s Return" (Popular Detective, Oct 1944) brought him back for one final adventure. Though an original story, it lifted the title from another Clown story in the October 18, 1930, issue of Detective Story Magazine.

=== Filmography ===
Many of Johnston McCulley's stories were made into films. McCulley also wrote for films. Here is a brief filmography.

- Ruth of the Rockies, 1920, story
- Captain Fly-by-Night, 1922, story
- Ride for Your Life, 1924, story
- The Ice Flood, 1926, story
- The Red Rope, 1937, story
- The Trusted Outlaw, 1937, story
- Rootin' Tootin' Rhythm, 1937, story
- Rose of the Rio Grande, 1938, story
- Doomed Caravan, 1941, writer
- Overland Mail, 1942, story
- South of the Rio Grande, 1945, story
- Don Ricardo Returns, 1946, story
- The Mark of the Renegade 1951, story

== Death ==
Johnston McCulley died on November 23, 1958, in Los Angeles, California at age 75. The Los Angeles Times obituary gives his address in Los Angeles as 6533 Hollywood Blvd. at the time of his death, an address which is confirmed in the Marquis volume and places McCulley in the Hillview Hollywood Apartments. There is no record of when he moved there, although the Marquis article may have been originally prepared in the late 1940s/early 1950s, with additional material appended in the late 1950s. The New York Times obituary mentions that he died "after a series of operations," a phrase echoed in other newspaper obituaries from other parts of the country, most likely taken from a New York Times feed.

McCulley is entombed in Forest Lawn Memorial Park, Glendale, Los Angeles, California.
