= Lasca of the Rio Grande =

1931 film

- Directed by: Edward Laemmle
- Written by: Randall Faye; Tom Reed
- Based on: Lasca by Frank Desprez
- Produced by: Carl Laemmle Jr. Samuel Bischoff
- Starring: Leo Carrillo; Dorothy Burgess
- Cinematography: Harry Neumann
- Edited by: Ted J. Kent
- Distributed by: Universal Pictures
- Release date: 1931
- Running time: 65 minutes
- Country: United States
- Language: English

Lasca of the Rio Grande is a 1931 American pre-Code film based on the poem "Lasca" by Frank Desprez.

== Plot ==
Rio Grande dance hall girl Lasca becomes involved in a love triangle between herself, her true love Miles Kincaid, and wealthy Mexican ranchero Jose Santa Cruz who wants her for his bride. Cruz kidnaps both Lasca and Kincaid and holds them hostage on his ranch on the Mexican side of the Rio Grande. When Lasca and Kincaid escape, they are caught in a cattle stampede during which Lasca is killed.

== Cast ==
- Leo Carrillo – Jose Santa Cruz
- Dorothy Burgess – Lasca
- Johnny Mack Brown – Miles Kincaid
- Frank Campeau – Jehosophat Smith
- Slim Summerville – "Crabapple" Thompson
