= Satan's Cradle =

1949 film by Ford Beebe

- Theatrical release poster
- Directed by: Ford Beebe
- Written by: J. Benton Cheney (screenplay); O. Henry (character)
- Produced by: Philip N. Krasne
- Starring: Duncan Renaldo; Leo Carrillo; Ann Savage; Douglas Fowley; Byron Foulger
- Cinematography: Jack Greenhalgh
- Edited by: Martin G. Cohn
- Music by: Albert Glasser
- Production company: Inter-American Productions
- Distributed by: United Artists
- Release date: October 7, 1949
- Running time: 60 minutes
- Country: United States
- Language: English

Satan's Cradle is a 1949 American Western film directed by Ford Beebe and written by J. Benton Cheney, and starring Duncan Renaldo, Leo Carrillo, Ann Savage, Douglas Fowley and Byron Foulger. It was released on October 7, 1949, by United Artists.

== Cast ==
- Duncan Renaldo as the Cisco Kid
- Leo Carrillo as Pancho
- Ann Savage as Lil
- Douglas Fowley as Steve Gentry
- Byron Foulger as Henry Lane
- Claire Carleton as Belle
- Buck Bailey as Henchman Rocky
- George DeNormand as Henchman Idaho
- Wes Hudman as Man shot by Rocky
