= The Cisco Kid Returns =

1945 film by John P. McCarthy

- Theatrical release poster
- Directed by: John P. McCarthy
- Written by: Betty Burbridge
- Produced by: Phillip N. Krasne
- Starring: Duncan Renaldo, Martin Garralaga
- Cinematography: Harry Neumann
- Edited by: Martin G. Cohn
- Music by: Albert Glasser
- Distributed by: Monogram Pictures
- Release date: February 16, 1945
- Running time: 64 minutes
- Country: United States
- Language: English

The Cisco Kid Returns is a 1945 American Western film. Released on April 3, 1945, it was the first of three Cisco Kid films made that year with Duncan Renaldo as Cisco and Martin Garralaga as Pancho. In this release, Cisco's real name is Juan Francisco Hernandez. Cisco must clear himself of murder charges while preventing his girlfriend Rosita (Callejo) from eloping with his rival John Harris (Pryor).

The film was followed by the May 15 release of In Old New Mexico, which revealed Cisco's name to be Juan Carlos Francisco Antonio, and South of the Rio Grande on September 15 falling back to Cisco's name being Juan Francisco Hernandez. Martin Garralaga appears in both as Pancho.

== Cast ==
- Duncan Renaldo – The Cisco Kid/Juan Francisco Hernandez
- Martin Garralaga – Pancho
- Cecilia Callejo – Rosita Gonzales
- Roger Pryor – John Harris
