= Martin G. Cohn =

American film editor

- Born: Martin Goodman Cohn; May 5, 1893; New York City, New York, USA
- Died: November 18, 1953 (aged 60); Hollywood, California, USA
- Other names: Moe Cohn
- Occupations: Film editor, film producer
- Children: Quinn Martin (son)

Martin Goodman "Marty" Cohn (May 5, 1893 – November 18, 1953) was an American film editor and film producer who worked on B-movie genre pictures in Hollywood from the 1910s through the 1940s.

== Biography ==
Cohn was born in New York City to Goodman Cohn and Jennie Nathan. His parents were Jewish immigrants. He married Anna Messing in Brooklyn in 1916. He began working as a film editor in the early 1910s, although like most editors of that era, he was not credited onscreen for his efforts. Eventually the family moved from New York City to Los Angeles, where he continued his career. He worked with Tiffany Pictures until its bankruptcy in 1932.

He was a founding member of the Society of Motion Picture Film Editors (a precursor to the Motion Picture Editors Guild) in 1937; early on, he served as treasurer. In the 1930s, he began working as a producer on projects, although editing seems to have continued to be his primary focus. During this time, he was credited with pioneering the "change-over," a technique that allowed projectionists to keep a film running without stopping to change reels.

He died in 1953 in Hollywood, where he had lived for 28 years. He was survived by his wife, Anna, and his son, Quinn Martin (who later became a famous TV producer). His brother Elias worked in Hollywood as a cameraman.

== Selected filmography ==
- The World and the Woman (1916)
- Mothers of Men (1917)
- Streets of Shanghai (1927)
- Wild Geese (1927)
- Once and Forever (1927)
- The Girl from Gay Paree (1927)
- The Cat and the Canary (1927)
- Stormy Waters (1928)
- The Scarlet Dove (1928)
- Nameless Men (1928)
- The Lost Zeppelin (1929)
- Unmasked (1929)
- Morals for Women (1931)
- Arizona Terror (1931)
- Left Over Ladies (1931)
- Alias the Bad Man (1931)
- Last of the Pagans (1935)
- Born to Fight (1936)
- Robin Hood, Jr. (1936)
- With Love and Kisses (1936)
- Headline Crasher (1936)
- Wild Horse Round-Up (1936)
- Sing While You're Able (1937)
- The Terror of Tiny Town (1938)
- Sunset Murder Case (1938)
- Mis dos amores (1938)
- Castillos en el aire (1938)
- Yukon Flight (1940)
- Borrowed Hero (1941)
- I Killed That Man (1941)
- The Deadly Game (1941)
- Murder by Invitation (1941)
- Paper Bullets (1941)
- Caught in the Act (1941)
- Girls' Town (1942)
- The Sultan's Daughter (1943)
- The Unknown Guest (1943)
- A Gentle Gangster (1943)
- Shadow of Suspicion (1944)
- When Strangers Marry (1944)
- Johnny Doesn't Live Here Anymore (1944)
- Charlie Chan in the Secret Service (1944)
- Song of the Range (1944)
- Sensation Hunters (1945)
- In Old New Mexico (1945)
- The Cisco Kid Returns (1945)
- God's Country (1946)
- Heading for Heaven (1947)
- Killer Dill (1947)
- Deadline (1948)
- The Valiant Hombre (1948)
- The Strange Mrs. Crane (1948)
- Lady at Midnight (1948)
- The Counterfeiters (1948)
- Satan's Cradle (1949)
- Zamba (1949)
- The Daring Caballero (1949)
- The Gay Amigo (1949)
- The Girl from San Lorenzo (1950)
- Oriental Evil (1951)
- Tokyo File 212 (1951)
