= Timber (1942 film) =

1942 film by Christy Cabanne

- Theatrical poster
- Directed by: Christy Cabanne
- Written by: Griffin Jay
- Based on: An original story by Ben Chapman, Larry Rhine
- Produced by: Ben Pivar
- Starring: Leo Carrillo, Andy Devine, Dan Dailey
- Cinematography: Jack MacKenzie
- Edited by: Otto Ludwig
- Distributed by: Universal Pictures
- Release date: 1942
- Running time: 60 minutes
- Country: United States
- Language: English

Timber is a 1942 drama film directed by Christy Cabanne. Its plot concerns the obstruction of lumber-mill production for Canada's Department of National Defence during World War II.

== Plot ==
Jules Fabian heads a gang of saboteurs determined to subvert the Canadian Forestry Corps. Quebec, Arizona and Kansas, three men who begin work at a lumber company, uncover the plot. Kansas, who in reality is working undercover for the corps, romances Yvette Lacour.

== Cast ==
- Leo Carrillo as Quebec
- Andy Devine as Arizona
- Dan Dailey as Alan Kansas
- Marjorie Lord as Yvette Lacour
- Wade Boteler as Dan Crowley
- Edmund MacDonald as Pierre Lacour
- Nestor Paiva as Jules Fabian
