= Byron Foulger =

American actor (1898–1970)

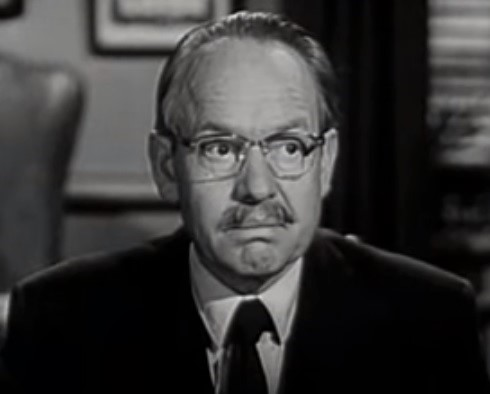
- Foulger in a 1960 episode of the anthology series One Step Beyond
- Born: Byron Kay Foulger; August 27, 1898; Ogden, Utah, U.S.
- Died: April 4, 1970 (aged 71); Los Angeles, California, U.S.
- Occupation: Actor
- Years active: 1920–1970
- Spouse: Dorothy Adams (m. 1921)
- Children: 2, including Rachel Ames

Byron Kay Foulger (August 27, 1898 – April 4, 1970) was an American character actor who over a 50-year career performed in hundreds of stage, film, and television productions.

== Early years ==
Born in Ogden, Utah, Byron was the second of four children of Annie Elizabeth (née Ingebertsen) of Norway and Arthur Kay Foulger, a native of Utah who worked as a carpenter for the region's railroad company. Byron completed his primary and secondary education in local public schools before enrolling at the University of Utah, where he started acting through his participation in community theatre. Foulger was a member of the Church of Jesus Christ of Latter-day Saints.

== Career ==
Foulger made his Broadway debut in March 1920 in a production of Medea featuring Moroni Olsen, and performed in four more productions with Olsen on the "Great White Way", back-to-back, ending in April 1922. He then toured with Olsen's stock company.

Foulger worked as a director for the Portland Civic Theater in Portland, Oregon in the early 1930s, before working at the Pasadena Playhouse as an actor, assistant director, and director.

In 1932, he began performing in films, initially in bit parts. His first three screen appearances are in Night World (1932), The Little Minister (1934), and The President's Mystery (1936), the latter based on a story by Franklin Delano Roosevelt. He also starred in an exploitation film, It's All in Your Mind (1937, released 1938), in which Foulger, a timid bookkeeper, samples the fast life of nightclubs and parties. Byron Foulger's motion picture career, however, did not begin in earnest until 1937, after he appeared in December of that year on NBC Radio in a racy "Adam and Eve" sketch starring Don Ameche and Mae West on the network's popular variety program The Chase and Sanborn Hour. That sketch and another performance by West with Charlie McCarthy during a later segment of the same program resulted in her being banned from NBC programming until 1950. Foulger, who provided the voice of the serpent in the controversial biblical parody, was not banned for his brief supporting role; instead, his association with the sketch brought him widespread media attention and greater audience recognition. From that point on, he worked steadily in motion pictures.

Foulger played many parts–storekeepers, hotel desk clerks, morticians, professors, bank tellers, ministers, confidence men, and a host of other characterizations–usually timid, whining, weak-willed, shifty, sanctimonious, or sycophantic. His earliest films show him clean-shaven, but in the 1940s, he adopted a wispy mustache that emphasized his characters' worried demeanor. When the mustache went gray in the 1950s, he reverted to a clean-shaven look. Foulger was a resourceful actor, and often embellished his scripted lines with memorable bits of business; in The Falcon Strikes Back, for example, hotel clerk Foulger announces a homicide by bellowing across the lobby: "Mur-der! Mur-der!'

In real life, Foulger was not as much of a pushover as the characters he played. In one memorable incident at a party, he threatened to punch Errol Flynn for flirting with his wife, actress Dorothy Adams, to whom he was married from 1921 until his death in 1970.

In the 1940s, Foulger was part of Preston Sturges' unofficial "stock company" of character actors, appearing in five films written by Sturges, The Great McGinty, Sullivan's Travels, The Palm Beach Story, The Miracle of Morgan's Creek (recreating the role of McGinty's secretary he played in The Great McGinty), and The Great Moment. In A pictures, such as those of Sturges', Foulger often received no screen credit; in B movies such as 1939's The Man They Could Not Hang, he got more substantial, billed parts.

By the late 1950s, Foulger had become well established for playing incredibly mild-mannered characters. One example is in the cameo-laden Frank Capra comedy Pocketful of Miracles. The actor was cast against type for a prominent role in his career when he played the Devil opposite The Bowery Boys in Up in Smoke. He was billed in advertisements and posters as one of the film's three stars.

Beginning in 1950, Foulger made more than 90 appearances on television, in such programs as Death Valley Days, I Love Lucy, The Cisco Kid, My Little Margie, The Man Behind the Badge, The Lone Ranger, Maverick, Lawman, The Red Skelton Show, Rawhide, Wagon Train, Bonanza, Burke's Law, Daniel Boone, Hazel, The Patty Duke Show, The Monkees, Perry Mason, Laredo, Gunsmoke, and in 1965, The Beverly Hillbillies and The Addams Family. He played multiple-episode characters on Dennis the Menace (Mr. Timberlake), Lassie (Dan Porter) and The Andy Griffith Show (Fred, the hotel clerk). On Petticoat Junction he played two recurring roles: Mr. Guerney and engineer Wendell Gibbs.

His notable later television credits include the 1959 Twilight Zone episode "Walking Distance" in which actor Gig Young tells Foulger, who is portraying a drugstore counterman, that he thinks he has seen him before, to which Foulger replies, "I've got that kind of face." A few examples of his other credits on television are his performances in the short-lived comedies My Mother the Car (as one of the villain's browbeaten advisors) and Captain Nice (as the hero's often silent father), as well as in two episodes of the crime drama The Mod Squad in 1968 and 1969.

Foulger's last performances were released in 1970, the year he died. They include the made-for-TV movie The Love War and in the feature films There Was a Crooked Man... and The Cockeyed Cowboys of Calico County.

== Death ==
Foulger, at age 71, died of heart problems in Hollywood on April 4, 1970, just a few hours before the final first run episode of Petticoat Junction aired on CBS.

== Filmography ==
- Night World (1932) - Mr. Baby / Nightclub Patron (uncredited) (film debut)
- The Little Minister (1934) - Villager at Stabbing (uncredited)
- The President's Mystery (1936) - Minor Role (uncredited)
- Larceny on the Air (1937) - Pete Andorka
- The Devil Diamond (1937) - Ole-Houseboy
- Dick Tracy (1937, Serial) as Korvitch [Chs. 1, 12]
- History Is Made at Night (1937) - Vail Employee Reading from Newspaper (uncredited)
- Make Way for Tomorrow (1937) - Mr. Dale (uncredited)
- A Day at the Races (1937) - Racetrack Spectator (uncredited)
- The Devil Is Driving (1937) - Mr. Muller (uncredited)
- The Prisoner of Zenda (1937) - Johann (uncredited)
- It Happened in Hollywood (1937) - Chet (uncredited)
- Luck of Roaring Camp (1937) - Kentuck
- The Duke Comes Back (1937) - Peters
- True Confession (1937) - Ballistic Expert (uncredited)
- Born to Be Wild (1938) - Husband
- King of the Newsboys (1938) - Gazette Owner (uncredited)
- It's All in Your Mind (1938) - Wilbur Crane
- Test Pilot (1938) - Designer (uncredited)
- The Lady in the Morgue (1938) - Al Horn (uncredited)
- Crime Ring (1938) - George Myles (uncredited)
- Delinquent Parents (1938) - Herbert Ellis
- Smashing the Rackets (1938) - Alverson - Chemist (uncredited)
- Tenth Avenue Kid (1938) - Dr. Belknap
- I Am the Law (1938) - Simpson (uncredited)
- You Can't Take It with You (1938) - Kirby's Assistant (uncredited)
- The Mad Miss Manton (1938) - Assistant News Editor (uncredited)
- The Spider's Web (1938, Serial) - Allen Roberts
- A Man to Remember (1938) - Bank Teller (uncredited)
- Tarnished Angel (1938) - Second Cripple
- Gangster's Boy (1938) - District Attorney's Secretary (uncredited)
- Say It in French (1938) - Swedish Janitor (uncredited)
- I Am a Criminal (1938) - Ed Harper
- Smashing the Spy Ring (1938) - Schuster aka Quirk (uncredited)
- Mystery of the White Room (1939) - The Coroner (uncredited)
- Let Us Live (1939) - Defense Attorney (uncredited)
- Streets of New York (1939) - 'Murderer' in Classroom (uncredited)
- Union Pacific (1939) - Andrew Whipple (uncredited)
- Some Like It Hot (1939) - Radio Announcer (uncredited)
- Missing Daughters (1939) - Bert Ford (uncredited)
- Exile Express (1939) - Serge
- The Girl from Mexico (1939) - Delivery Entrance Guard (uncredited)
- Million Dollar Legs (1939) - Frederick Day, Dean Wixby's Secretary (uncredited)
- Andy Hardy Gets Spring Fever (1939) - Mark Hansen (uncredited)
- The Spellbinder (1939) - J.J. Henkins - Auditor (uncredited)
- Mutiny on the Blackhawk (1939) - Coombs - a Sailor
- In Name Only (1939) - Owen - Clerk (uncredited)
- Girl from Rio (1939) - William Wilson
- The Man They Could Not Hang (1939) - Lang
- Hawaiian Nights (1939) - Evans (uncredited)
- A Woman Is the Judge (1939) - Ballistic Expert (uncredited)
- Sabotage (1939) - Henry - Husband of Laura Austin (uncredited)
- Mr. Smith Goes to Washington (1939) - Hopper's Secretary (uncredited)
- Television Spy (1939) - William Sheldon
- Beware Spooks! (1939) - Bank Cashier (uncredited)
- Bad Little Angel (1939) - New Sentinel Editor (uncredited)
- The Secret of Dr. Kildare (1939) - Hospital Attendant (uncredited)
- Heroes of the Saddle (1940) - Superintendent Melloney
- Abe Lincoln in Illinois (1940) - Politician (uncredited)
- The Saint's Double Trouble (1940) - Ephraim Byrd (uncredited)
- Parole Fixer (1940) - Florist (uncredited)
- Flash Gordon Conquers the Universe (1940, Serial) - Professor Drok [Chs. 11-12]
- Curtain Call (1940) - Theater Group Director (uncredited)
- The Man with Nine Lives (1940) - Dr. Bassett
- Edison, the Man (1940) - Edwin Hall
- Opened by Mistake (1940) - Roger Weatherby (uncredited)
- Untamed (1940) - Nels (uncredited)
- Three Faces West (1940) - Joe Stebbins (uncredited)
- The Great McGinty (1940) - Governor's Secretary (uncredited)
- Golden Gloves (1940) - Hemingway (uncredited)
- Boom Town (1940) - Geologist (uncredited)
- I Want a Divorce (1940) - Secretary (uncredited)
- Good Bad Boys (1940, Short) - Mr. Stephens - Store Proprietor (uncredited)
- Sky Murder (1940) - Kuse
- Arizona (1940) - Pete Kitchen
- Ellery Queen, Master Detective (1940) - Amos
- Dr. Kildare's Crisis (1940) - Orderly at Emergency Switchboard (uncredited)
- Behind the News (1940) - John - Alcoholic Father (uncredited)
- Ridin' on a Rainbow (1941) - Matt 'Pop' Evans
- Blonde Inspiration (1941) - Hutchins' Associate (uncredited)
- Meet Boston Blackie (1941) - Blind Man (uncredited)
- The Penalty (1941) - Bank Manager (uncredited)
- Man Made Monster (1941) - Alienist #2
- Sis Hopkins (1941) - Joe
- Roar of the Press (1941) - Eddie Tate (uncredited)
- Under Age (1941) - Downey
- The Gay Vagabond (1941) - Vogel
- She Knew All the Answers (1941) - Man in the Elevator (uncredited)
- Sweetheart of the Campus (1941) - Dr. Bailey
- I Was a Prisoner on Devil's Island (1941) - Presidente Judge (uncredited)
- The Deadly Game (1941) - Motel Manager
- Mystery Ship (1941) - Wasserman
- Helping Hands (1941, Short) - Head of the civilian counsel
- The Stork Pays Off (1941) - Teacher (uncredited)
- You Belong to Me (1941) - Delaney (uncredited)
- Come Back, Miss Pipps (1941, Short) - Attorney Arthur Prince (uncredited)
- Ellery Queen and the Murder Ring (1941) - Male Nurse (uncredited)
- The Night of January 16th (1941) - Jeweler (uncredited)
- H.M. Pulham, Esq. (1941) - Curtis Cole (uncredited)
- Sullivan's Travels (1941) - Mr. Johnny Valdelle
- Dude Cowboy (1941) - Frank Adams
- Harvard, Here I Come! (1941) - Prof. Alvin
- Road to Happiness (1941) - Jackson
- Bedtime Story (1941) - First Hotel Clerk (uncredited)
- Remember the Day (1941) - Mr. Blanton - Photographer (uncredited)
- Man from Headquarters (1942) - Hotel Manager Clark
- The Power of God (1942) - Dr. Bradden
- The Adventures of Martin Eden (1942) - Smithers (uncredited)
- Reap the Wild Wind (1942) - Bixby (uncredited)
- Who Is Hope Schuyler? (1942) - George
- Fingers at the Window (1942) - Bird Man (uncredited)
- The Tuttles of Tahiti (1942) - Assistant Bank Manager (uncredited)
- A Desperate Chance for Ellery Queen (1942) - Freddy Froelich (uncredited)
- The Panther's Claw (1942) - Everett P. Digberry
- Pacific Rendezvous (1942) - Decoding Room Clerk (uncredited)
- Flying with Music (1942) - Horace Willpott, Travel Guide (uncredited)
- Miss Annie Rooney (1942) - Mr. Randall (uncredited)
- The Magnificent Dope (1942) - Fifth Man to Leave Class (uncredited)
- Sabotage Squad (1942) - Suspect (uncredited)
- The Palm Beach Story (1942) - Jewelry Salesman (uncredited)
- The Man in the Trunk (1942) - Man at Auction (uncredited)
- Apache Trail (1942) - Clerk (uncredited)
- The Forest Rangers (1942) - Collector (uncredited)
- Wrecking Crew (1942) - Mission Worker
- Quiet Please, Murder (1942) - Edmund Walpole (uncredited)
- Stand by for Action (1942) - Pharmacist's Mate 'Doc' Miller
- Margin for Error (1943) - Drug Store Clerk (uncredited)
- The Human Comedy (1943) - Mr. Blenton - Track Coach (uncredited)
- Hoppy Serves a Writ (1943) - Danvers - Hardware Store Proprietor
- Dixie Dugan (1943) - Secretary
- Hangmen Also Die! (1943) - Bartos
- The Falcon Strikes Back (1943) - Mr. Argyle - Hotel Clerk (uncredited)
- Shantytown (1943) - Politician (uncredited)
- Dr. Gillespie's Criminal Case (1943) - Father (uncredited)
- The Black Raven (1943) - Horace Weatherby
- Coney Island (1943) - Organist at Wedding (uncredited)
- Henry Aldrich Swings It (1943) - Drugstore Owner (uncredited)
- Appointment in Berlin (1943) - Herr Van Leyden (uncredited)
- First Comes Courage (1943) - Norwegian Shopkeeper (uncredited)
- Hi Diddle Diddle (1943) - Watson
- Silver Spurs (1943) - Justice of the Peace
- The Adventures of a Rookie (1943) - Mr. Linden (uncredited)
- So Proudly We Hail! (1943) - Mr. Larson (uncredited)
- The Kansan (1943) - Ed Tracy (uncredited)
- Sweet Rosie O'Grady (1943) - Rimplemayer (uncredited)
- In Old Oklahoma (1943) - Wilkins
- The Miracle of Morgan's Creek (1943) - McGinty's Secretary (uncredited)
- What a Woman! (1943) - Buxton Hotel Clerk (uncredited)
- Beautiful But Broke (1944) - Maxwell McKay
- Lady in the Death House (1944) - Mr. Avery (uncredited)
- The Whistler (1944) - Flophouse Desk Clerk (uncredited)
- Gambler's Choice (1944) - Phony Robbery Victim (uncredited)
- Once Upon a Time (1944) - Theatregoer (uncredited)
- Ministry of Fear (1944) - Mr. Newby (uncredited)
- Stars on Parade (1944) - Mr. Barker (uncredited)
- Ladies of Washington (1944) - Desk Clerk (uncredited)
- 3 Men in White (1944) - Technician (uncredited)
- A Night of Adventure (1944) - Battersby, Glove Expert (uncredited)
- Roger Touhy, Gangster (1944) - Court Clerk (uncredited)
- Take It Big (1944) - Mr. Jones (uncredited)
- Henry Aldrich's Little Secret (1944) - Bill Collector
- Since You Went Away (1944) - High School Principal (uncredited)
- Summer Storm (1944) - Clerk in Newspaper Office (uncredited)
- The Great Moment (1944) - Morton's Clinic Manager (uncredited)
- Swing in the Saddle (1944) - Sheriff Mort Tucker
- Maisie Goes to Reno (1944) - Dr. Joe Carter - Psychiatrist (uncredited)
- When Strangers Marry (1944) - Albert Foster (uncredited)
- Casanova Brown (1944) - Fletcher (uncredited)
- Marriage Is a Private Affair (1944) - Ned Bolton
- Ever Since Venus (1944) - Henley, the Druggist (uncredited)
- Barbary Coast Gent (1944) - Assayer H.E. Holcomb (uncredited)
- Dark Mountain (1944) - Harvey Bates
- Music in Manhattan (1944) - Ticket Agent (uncredited)
- An American Romance (1944) - High School Principal (uncredited)
- Mrs. Parkington (1944) - Norman Vance (uncredited)
- Girl Rush (1944) - Oscar - Hotel Proprietor (uncredited)
- Mystery of the River Boat (1944, Serial) - Dr. H. Hartman
- Enemy of Women (1944) - Krause, Brown Shirt
- And Now Tomorrow (1944) - Clerk (uncredited)
- Music for Millions (1944) - Mr. Perkins (uncredited)
- Let's Go Steady (1945) - Waldemar Oates (uncredited)
- Grissly's Millions (1945) - Fred Palmor
- Adventures of Kitty O'Day (1945) - Roberts
- Brewster's Millions (1945) - Attorney Lyons (uncredited)
- Circumstantial Evidence (1945) - Bolger
- It's in the Bag! (1945) - Mr. Teckler (uncredited)
- The Master Key (1945, Serial) - Prof. Elwood Henderson
- Don Juan Quilligan (1945) - Dr. Spenser, DDS (uncredited)
- Wonder Man (1945) - Deli Customer (uncredited)
- Blonde from Brooklyn (1945) - Harvey (uncredited)
- The Cheaters (1945) - Process Server (uncredited)
- The Hidden Eye (1945) - Burton Lorrison
- Arson Squad (1945) - Amos Baxter
- Week-End at the Waldorf (1945) - Joe - Chip's Barber (uncredited)
- Sensation Hunters (1945) - Mark Rogers
- Voice of the Whistler (1945) - Georgie (uncredited)
- Cornered (1945) - Hotel Night Clerk (uncredited)
- Snafu (1945) - Phil Ford
- Follow That Woman (1945) - Orville (uncredited)
- Scarlet Street (1945) - Jones - Apartment Manager (uncredited)
- Adventure (1945) - Mr. Littleton (uncredited)
- People Are Funny (1946) - Mr. Button (uncredited)
- Deadline at Dawn (1946) - Night Attendant (uncredited)
- Breakfast in Hollywood (1946) - Mr. Henderson (uncredited)
- Sentimental Journey (1946) - Mr. Tweedy (uncredited)
- Just Before Dawn (1946) - Harris, Makeup Man (uncredited)
- House of Horrors (1946) - Mr. Samuels (uncredited)
- Blonde Alibi (1946) - Wilson (uncredited)
- The Hoodlum Saint (1946) - J. Cornwall Travers (uncredited)
- Two Sisters from Boston (1946) - Recording Technician (uncredited)
- The Postman Always Rings Twice (1946) - Picnic Manager (uncredited)
- The French Key (1946) - Peabody
- Suspense (1946) - Cab Driver at Lodge (uncredited)
- The Mysterious Mr. M (1946, Serial) - Wetherby / Mr. M
- Courage of Lassie (1946) - Dr. Coleman (uncredited)
- The Secret of the Whistler (1946) - Jorgensen (uncredited)
- Plainsman and the Lady (1946) - Mr. Simmons
- Dick Tracy vs. Cueball (1946) - Simon Little
- Magnificent Doll (1946) - Politician (uncredited)
- Till the Clouds Roll By (1946) - Frohman's Secretary (uncredited)
- San Quentin (1946) - Mr. Dixon, Coffee Shop Proprietor (uncredited)
- The Show-Off (1946) - Mr. Jenkins (uncredited)
- It's a Joke, Son! (1947) - Groceryman
- Easy Come, Easy Go (1947) - Sporting Goods Shop Owner (uncredited)
- The Michigan Kid (1947) - Mr. Porter
- Bells of San Fernando (1947) - Francisco Garcia, Mission Blacksmith
- Stallion Road (1947) - (uncredited)
- Hard Boiled Mahoney (1947) - Prof. Quizard
- Love and Learn (1947) - The Bridegroom (uncredited)
- The Adventures of Don Coyote (1947) - Henry Felton
- Fun on a Weekend (1947) - Man at Lunch Counter (uncredited)
- Too Many Winners (1947) - Ben Edwards/Claude Bates
- The Long Night (1947) - Man with Bike (uncredited)
- The Trouble with Women (1947) - Little Thin Man (uncredited)
- They Won't Believe Me (1947) - Harry Bascomb - Mortician (uncredited)
- Second Chance (1947) - Emery (uncredited)
- Unconquered (1947) - Townsman (uncredited)
- Song of Love (1947) - Bailiff (uncredited)
- Linda, Be Good (1947) - Bookshop Owner
- The Chinese Ring (1947) - Armstrong
- Arch of Triumph (1948) - Policeman at Accident (uncredited)
- Relentless (1948) - Assayer (uncredited)
- The Bride Goes Wild (1948) - Max (uncredited)
- Borrowed Trouble (1948) - Mike the Bartender (uncredited)
- A Southern Yankee (1948) - Mr. Duncan (scenes deleted)
- They Live by Night (1948) - Lambert
- Out of the Storm (1948) - Al Weinstock
- I Surrender Dear (1948) - George Rogers
- The Three Musketeers (1948) - Bonacieux (uncredited)
- The Return of October (1948) - Jonathan Grant (uncredited)
- The Kissing Bandit (1948) - Grandee (uncredited)
- He Walked by Night (1948) - Freddie - Bureau of Records and Identification (uncredited)
- Let's Live a Little (1948) - Mr. Hopkins (uncredited)
- Trouble Preferred (1948) - O'Rourke (uncredited)
- I Shot Jesse James (1949) - Silver King Room Clerk
- Tucson (1949) - Elkins (uncredited)
- Streets of Laredo (1949) - Artist Who Draws Reming (uncredited)
- Arson, Inc. (1949) - Thomas Peyson
- Mighty Joe Young (1949) - Mr. Jones (uncredited)
- Satan's Cradle (1949) - Henry Lane, The Preacher
- The Dalton Gang (1949) - Amos Boling
- Chinatown at Midnight (1949) - Greer Pharmacy Druggist
- Dancing in the Dark (1949) - Stephen (uncredited)
- Red Desert (1949) - Sparky Jackson
- Samson and Delilah (1949) - (uncredited)
- The Inspector General (1949) - Burbis (uncredited)
- Key to the City (1950) - Custodian (uncredited)
- The Girl from San Lorenzo (1950) - Ross, station agent
- Riding High (1950) - Maitre d' (uncredited)
- Salt Lake Raiders (1950) - John Sutton - Lawyer
- Champagne for Caesar (1950) - Gerald
- Union Station (1950) - Horace - Baggage Clerk (uncredited)
- The Return of Jesse James (1950) - Rufe Dakin
- Dark City (1950) - Motel Manager (uncredited)
- To Please a Lady (1950) - Shoe Fitter (uncredited)
- Experiment Alcatraz (1950) - Jim Carlton - Realtor
- The Cisco Kid (1950-1954, TV Series) - Claude Bobkins Jr. / Harley, Bank president
- Gasoline Alley (1951) - Charles D. Haven
- Lightning Strikes Twice (1951) - Hummel, Hotel Clerk (uncredited)
- Home Town Story (1951) - Berny Miles
- Best of the Badmen (1951) - Judge (uncredited)
- Disc Jockey (1951) - Clerk (uncredited)
- FBI Girl (1951) - Morgue Attendant
- The Sea Hornet (1951) - Clerk
- Superman and the Mole Men (1951) - Jeff Reagan (uncredited)
- The Steel Fist (1952) - Prof. Kardin
- Rose of Cimarron (1952) - Coroner
- Mutiny (1952) - Chairman Parson's Secretary (uncredited)
- My Six Convicts (1952) - Dr. Brint - Dentist
- Hold That Line (1952) - Mathematics Professor Grog (uncredited)
- The Sniper (1952) - Peter Eureka (uncredited)
- Skirts Ahoy! (1952) - Tearoom Manager (uncredited)
- Apache Country (1952) - Secretary Bartlett (uncredited)
- Cripple Creek (1952) - S. Hawkins - Undertaker (uncredited)
- We're Not Married! (1952) - Marriage License Bureau Clerk (uncredited)
- The Star (1952) - Druggist (uncredited)
- Ellis in Freedomland (1952) - Watchman
- The Magnetic Monster (1953) - Mr. Simon
- I Love Lucy (1953) S2E25 “Lucy’s Last Birthday” - Leader of the band
- Confidentially Connie (1953) - Prof. Rosenberg (uncredited)
- A Perilous Journey (1953) - Martin, Desk Clerk (uncredited)
- Run for the Hills (1953) - Mr. Simpson
- Gun Belt (1953) - The Hotel Clerk (uncredited)
- Cruisin' Down the River (1953) - Ben Fisher (uncredited)
- Bandits of the West (1953) - Eric Strikler
- The Moonlighter (1953) - Mr. Gurley (uncredited)
- Paris Model (1953) - Ernest Boggs
- The Flaming Urge (1953) - A. Horace Pender
- The Rocket Man (1954) - Card Player Wearing Glasses (uncredited)
- Silver Lode (1954) - Prescott (uncredited)
- Cattle Queen of Montana (1954) - Land Office Clerk
- The Scarlet Coat (1955) - Man with Delivery for Mr. Moody (uncredited)
- The Spoilers (1955) - Montrose
- At Gunpoint (1955) - Larry, the Teller (uncredited)
- Thunder Over Arizona (1956) - Byron (uncredited)
- You Can't Run Away from It (1956) - Billings, Andrews' Secretary
- The Desperados Are in Town (1956) - Jim Day
- The Young Stranger (1957) - Mr. Doyle (uncredited)
- Curfew Breakers (1957) - School Principal
- The Phantom Stagecoach (1957) - Mr. Fenshaw (uncredited)
- The River's Edge (1957) - Floyd Barry
- The Iron Sheriff (1937) - Jed - Court Clerk (uncredited)
- Sierra Stranger (1957) - Claim Clerk Kelso
- Dino (1957) - Gas Station Attendant (uncredited)
- The Buckskin Lady (1957) - Latham
- Gun Battle at Monterey (1957) - Carson
- Up in Smoke (1957) - Mr. Bubb
- Man from God's Country (1958) - Will Potter (uncredited)
- Going Steady (1958) - Mr. George Potter
- The Long, Hot Summer (1958) - Harris (uncredited)
- Terror in a Texas Town (1958) - The Minister (uncredited)
- Onionhead (1958) - Funeral Director (scenes deleted)
- King of the Wild Stallions (1959) - A.B. Orcutt
- High School Big Shot (1959) - Mr. Mathews
- The Rebel Set (1959) - Conductor, Chicago Train
- Ma Barker's Killer Brood (1960) - Dr. Guelffe
- Twelve Hours to Kill (1960) - Selby Gardner
- Devil's Partner (1961) - Papers
- Pocketful of Miracles (1961) - Lloyd (uncredited)
- Ride the High Country (1962) - Abner Samson (uncredited)
- Perry Mason (1962) - Pop--Leverett Thomas
- Son of Flubber (1963) - Proprietor (uncredited)
- Who's Minding the Store? (1963) - Bargain Sale Department Manager (uncredited)
- Guns of Diablo (1964) - Bit Part (uncredited)
- Marriage on the Rocks (1965) - Mr. Bruno (uncredited)
- The Swinger (1966) - Court Clerk (uncredited)
- The Spirit Is Willing (1967) - Drug Store Owner (uncredited)
- The Gnome-Mobile (1967) - Hotel Desk Clerk (uncredited)
- Blackbeard's Ghost (1968) - Mr. Harrison - First Bidder (uncredited)
- Hook, Line & Sinker (1969) - Funeral Director (uncredited)
- The Love War (1970, TV Movie) - Will
- The Cockeyed Cowboys of Calico County (1970) - Rev. Marshall
- There Was a Crooked Man... (1970) - Member of Town Council (uncredited) (final film role)

== Television ==
Year	Title	Role	Notes
1960	Rawhide	Lismore	S2:E12, "Incident of the Druid Curse"
1967	The Lucy Show	Mr. Trindle	S5:E19, "Lucy Meets the Law"
