= Song of the Range =

1944 film directed by Wallace Fox

- Directed by: Wallace Fox
- Written by: Betty Burbridge; Stanley Roberts
- Produced by: Philip N. Krasne; Richard L'Estrange
- Starring: Jimmy Wakely; Dennis Moore; Lee 'Lasses' White
- Cinematography: Marcel Le Picard
- Edited by: Martin G. Cohn
- Music by: Frank Sanucci
- Production company: Monogram Pictures
- Distributed by: Monogram Pictures
- Release date: December 1, 1944
- Running time: 55 minutes
- Country: United States
- Language: English

Song of the Range is a 1944 American musical Western film directed by Wallace Fox and starring Jimmy Wakely, Dennis Moore and Lee 'Lasses' White.

== Cast ==
- Jimmy Wakely as Jimmy
- Dennis Moore as Denny
- Lee 'Lasses' White as Lasses
- Cay Forester as Dale Harding
- Sam Flint as John Winters
- Hugh Prosser as Bruce Carter
- George Eldredge as Federal Agent CleveTrevor
- Steve Clark as Sheriff Duncan
- Edmund Cobb as Thomas 'Tom' Manning
- Cedric Stevens as Chase - Mesa Inn Manager
- The Sunshine Girls as Singers
- Johnny Bond as Johnny

== Bibliography ==
- Martin, Len D. The Allied Artists Checklist: The Feature Films and Short Subjects of Allied Artists Pictures Corporation, 1947-1978. McFarland & Company, 1993.
