= South of the Rio Grande (1945 film) =

1945 film by Lambert Hillyer

- Directed by: Lambert Hillyer
- Written by: Victor Hammond, Ralph Bettinson
- Based on: an original story by Johnston McCulley
- Produced by: Lindsley Parsons
- Starring: Duncan Renaldo, Martin Garralaga
- Cinematography: William A. Sickner
- Edited by: William Austin
- Distributed by: Monogram Pictures
- Release date: 1945
- Running time: 62 minutes
- Country: United States
- Language: English

South of the Rio Grande is a 1945 American western film. Released on September 15, it was the third of three Cisco Kid films made that year with Duncan Renaldo as Cisco and Martin Garralaga as Pancho.

Unusual as a Cisco Kid film, this one is a quasi-musical and opens with Cisco serenading a girlfriend. The Guadalajara Trio are featured as themselves. In this release, Cisco's real name is Juan Francisco Hernandez. Bandits Cisco and Pancho travel to a Mexican town to battle corrupt official Miguel Sanchez (Lewis) whose girlfriend Pepita (Armida) sings at a cantina. Dolores Gonzales (Molleri) is abducted and forced to sing in the cantina. When Cisco and Pancho go undercover at the Sanchez hacienda, Sanchez is eventually killed by Cisco and the town is rid of the corruption.

The film was preceded by the April 3 release of The Cisco Kid Returns, which revealed Cisco's name to be Juan Francisco Hernandez, and In Old New Mexico on May 15, with Cisco's name changed to Juan Carlos Francisco Antonio.

== Cast ==
- Duncan Renaldo – The Cisco Kid/Juan Francisco Hernandez
- Martin Garralaga – Pancho
- George J. Lewis – Miguel Sanchez
- Lillian Molieri – Dolores Gonzales
- The Guadalajara Trio
- Armida – Pepita
