= The Gay Amigo =

1949 film

- Original film poster
- Directed by: Wallace Fox
- Written by: Doris Schroeder
- Based on: O. Henry (character)
- Produced by: Philip N. Krasne
- Starring: Duncan Renaldo; Leo Carrillo; Armida
- Cinematography: Ernest Miller
- Edited by: Martin G. Cohn
- Music by: Albert Glasser
- Production company: Inter-American Productions
- Distributed by: United Artists
- Release date: 1949
- Running time: 60 minutes
- Country: United States
- Language: English

The Gay Amigo is a 1949 American Western film starring Duncan Renaldo in the lead role of The Cisco Kid. This film was one entry in a series of Cisco Kid B Westerns produced by Philip N. Krasne. Ziv Television Programs later advanced money to Krasne in order to purchase the television rights for the Cisco Kid. Krasne later produced The O. Henry Playhouse.

== Plot ==
Cisco and Pancho are at the border of the Arizona Territory and Mexico where they see a platoon of U.S. Cavalry pursuing what looks to be a band of bandidos. Escaping to Mexico, one of the bandidos falls off his horse. Cisco and Pancho see that not only is he dead, but he is actually a Norteamericano in charro costume. Cisco and Pancho use the U.S. Army, the local newspaper, a bar girl and a variety of respectable American citizens by playing them off against each other to discover the Americans attempting to blame Mexicans for stopping Arizona Statehood.

== Cast ==
- Duncan Renaldo as The Cisco Kid
- Leo Carrillo as Pancho
- Armida as Rosita
- Fred Kohler Jr. as Brack
- Clayton Moore as Lieutenant
- Fred Crane as Henchman Duke
