= In Old New Mexico =

1945 film by Phil Rosen

- Directed by: Phil Rosen
- Written by: Betty Burbridge
- Produced by: Phillip N. Krasne
- Starring: Duncan Renaldo, Martin Garralaga
- Cinematography: Arthur Martinelli
- Edited by: Martin G. Cohn
- Music by: Albert Glasser
- Distributed by: Monogram Pictures
- Release date: 15 May 1945
- Running time: 62 minutes
- Country: United States
- Language: English

In Old New Mexico is a 1945 American Western drama film. Released on May 15, 1945, it was the second of three Cisco Kid films made that year with Duncan Renaldo as Cisco and Martin Garralaga as Pancho.

In this release, Cisco's real name is Juan Carlos Francisco Antonio. This version depicting Cisco as a road bandit is closer to the original Cisco character created by O. Henry in his 1907 short story "The Caballero's Way". Cisco and Pancho abduct Ellen Roth (Kenyon) when they hold up a stage coach. Once she tells her sad story about being a nurse being framed for murder of her charge, by the deceased's nephew Will Hastings (Willis), they agree to help clear her name. As part of trapping Hastings, they demand a $10,000 ransom to release Roth. The ransom is immediately paid, and Roth is turned over to the sheriff. Running a fake newspaper story claiming the release of Roth by the sheriff, Cisco offers to kill Roth for Hastings. Roth is eventually cleared of the murder.

The film was preceded by the April 3 release of The Cisco Kid Returns, which revealed Cisco's name to be Juan Francisco Hernandez, and was followed by South of the Rio Grande on September 15, with Cisco's name again being Juan Francisco Hernandez. Martin Garralaga appears in both as Pancho.

== Cast ==
- Duncan Renaldo – The Cisco Kid/Juan Carlos Francisco Antonio
- Martin Garralaga – Pancho
- Gwen Kenyon – Ellen Roth
- Norman Willis – Will Hastings
