= Sensation Hunters (1945 film) =

1945 film by Christy Cabanne

- Directed by: Christy Cabanne
- Written by: Dennis J. Cooper (writer); John Faxon (story)
- Produced by: Joe Kaufmann
- Starring: See below
- Cinematography: Ira H. Morgan
- Edited by: Martin G. Cohn
- Release date: October 13, 1945
- Running time: 62 minutes
- Country: United States
- Language: English

Sensation Hunters, also known as Club Paradise, is a 1945 American film directed by Christy Cabanne.

== Plot ==
A naive young girl, looking to escape from a bad family situation, falls in love with a man who turns out to be a cad, and leads her down the road to ruin.

== Cast ==
- Robert Lowery as Danny Burke
- Doris Merrick as Julie Rogers
- Eddie Quillan as Ray Lawson
- Constance Worth as Irene
- Isabel Jewell as Mae
- Wanda McKay as Helen
- Nestor Paiva as Lew Davis
- Byron Foulger as Mark Rogers
- Vince Barnett as Agent
- Minerva Urecal as Edna Rogers
- Janet Shaw as Katie Rogers
- The Rubenettes as Dancing Ensemble
- Lyle Talbot as Randall (scenes deleted)
- Johnson Brothers as Themselves
- Bobby Barber as Waiter
- John Hamilton as Night Court Judge
- Dewey Robinson as Stony, Bartender at Paradise Club
