= The Valiant Hombre =

1948 film by Wallace Fox

- Directed by: Wallace Fox
- Written by: O. Henry (character)
- Screenplay by: Adele Buffington
- Produced by: Philip N. Krasne
- Starring: Duncan Renaldo; Leo Carrillo; John Litel; Barbara Billingsley; John James; Stanley Andrews
- Cinematography: Ernest Miller
- Edited by: Martin G. Cohn
- Music by: Albert Glasser
- Production company: Inter-American Productions
- Distributed by: United Artists
- Release date: December 15, 1948
- Running time: 60 minutes
- Country: United States
- Language: English

The Valiant Hombre is a 1948 American Western film directed by Wallace Fox, written by Adele Buffington, and starring Duncan Renaldo, Leo Carrillo, John Litel, Barbara Billingsley, John James and Stanley Andrews. It was released on December 15, 1948, by United Artists.

== Cast ==
- Duncan Renaldo as the Cisco Kid
- Leo Carrillo as Pancho
- John Litel as Lon Lansdell
- Barbara Billingsley as Linda Mason
- John James as Paul Mason
- Stanley Andrews as Sheriff George Dodge
- Guy Beach as Old Joe Haskins
- Gene Roth as Pete
- Ralph Peters as Deputy Clay
- Terry Frost as Henchman Brett
- Lee 'Lasses' White as Whiskers
- Frank Ellis as Henchman Duffy
- George DeNormand as Henchman Lefty
- Daisy as Daisy the Dog
