= Rose of the Rio Grande =

1938 film by William Nigh

- Directed by: William Nigh
- Written by: Dorothy Reid; Ralph Bettinson
- Based on: a novel by Johnston McCulley
- Produced by: Dorothy Reid
- Starring: Movita Castaneda; Duncan Renaldo; John Carroll
- Cinematography: Gilbert Warrenton
- Edited by: Russell Schoengarth
- Music by: Hugo Riesenfeld
- Production company: Monogram Pictures
- Distributed by: Monogram Pictures
- Release date: March 16, 1938
- Running time: 61 minutes
- Country: United States
- Language: English

Rose of the Rio Grande is a 1938 American Western film directed by William Nigh and starring Movita Castaneda as Rosita de la Torre.

== Plot ==
When killers come after her wealthy brother Don Jose, she narrowly escapes with Sebastian and hides out under the guise of a cabaret singer. After her ruse is discovered by the real cabaret singer Anita, Rosita is rescued by El Gato.

== Cast ==
- Movita Castaneda as Rosita de la Torre
- John Carroll as El Gato/Don Ramon de Peralta
- Duncan Renaldo as Sebastian
- Don Alvarado as Don Jose de la Torre
- Antonio Moreno as Captain Lugo
- Lina Basquette as Anita
- George Cleveland as Pedro
- Gino Corrado as Castro
- Martin Garralaga as Luis
- Rosa Turich as Maria
