= The Daring Caballero =

1949 film by Wallace Fox

- Theatrical release poster
- Directed by: Wallace Fox
- Screenplay by: Betty Burbridge
- Story by: Frances Kavanaugh
- Based on: The Cisco Kid by O. Henry
- Produced by: Philip N. Krasne
- Starring: Duncan Renaldo; Leo Carrillo; Kippee Valez; Charles Halton; Pedro de Cordoba; Stephen Chase
- Cinematography: Lester White
- Edited by: Martin G. Cohn
- Music by: Albert Glasser
- Production company: Inter-American Productions
- Distributed by: United Artists
- Release date: June 14, 1949
- Running time: 60 minutes
- Country: United States
- Language: English

The Daring Caballero is a 1949 American Western film directed by Wallace Fox and written by Betty Burbridge. The film stars Duncan Renaldo, Leo Carrillo, Kippee Valez, Charles Halton, Pedro de Cordoba and Stephen Chase. The film was released on June 14, 1949, by United Artists.

== Cast ==
- Duncan Renaldo as the Cisco Kid
- Leo Carrillo as Pancho
- Kippee Valez as Kippee Valez
- Charles Halton as Ed J. Hodges
- Pedro de Cordoba as Padre Leonardo
- Stephen Chase as Major Bruce Brady
- David Leonard as Patrick Del Rio
- Edmund Cobb as Marshal J.B. Scott
- Frank Jaquet as Judge Perkins
- Mickey Little as Bobby Del Rio
- Wes Hudman as Deputy Post
