= Pancho Villa Returns =

- Directed by: Miguel Contreras Torres
- Written by: Miguel Contreras Torres
- Produced by: Miguel Contreras Torres
- Starring: Leo Carrillo, Rodolfo Acosta
- Distributed by: Hispano Continental Films
- Release date: 1950
- Country: Mexico
- Language: English

Pancho Villa Returns is a 1950 film directed by Miguel Contreras Torres and starring Leo Carrillo as the famous Mexican revolutionary general, Pancho Villa.

Made simultaneously with Vuelve Pancho Villa, this film used the same script but the other film had Pedro Armendariz playing Villa instead of Carrillo.

== Cast ==
- Leo Carrillo – Pancho Villa
- Rodolfo Acosta – Martin Corona
