= The Girl from San Lorenzo =

1950 film by Derwin Abrahams

- Directed by: Derwin Abrahams
- Screenplay by: Ford Beebe; O. Henry (character)
- Produced by: Philip N. Krasne
- Starring: Duncan Renaldo; Leo Carrillo; Jane Adams; William F. Leicester; Byron Foulger; Don C. Harvey
- Cinematography: Kenneth Peach
- Edited by: Martin G. Cohn
- Music by: Albert Glasser
- Production company: Inter-American Productions
- Distributed by: United Artists
- Release date: February 24, 1950
- Running time: 58 minutes
- Country: United States
- Language: English

The Girl from San Lorenzo is a 1950 American Western film directed by Derwin Abrahams and written by Ford Beebe. The film stars Duncan Renaldo, Leo Carrillo, Jane Adams, William F. Leicester, Byron Foulger and Don C. Harvey. It was released on February 24, 1950, by United Artists.

== Cast ==
- Duncan Renaldo as the Cisco Kid
- Leo Carrillo as Pancho
- Jane Adams as Nora Malloy
- William F. Leicester as Jerry Todd
- Byron Foulger as Ross
- Don C. Harvey as Henchman Kansas
- Lee Phelps as Sheriff Marlowe
- Edmund Cobb as The Phoney Pancho
- Leonard Penn as Tom McCarger
- David Sharpe as The Phoney Cisco
- Wes Hudman as Henchman Rusty
