= Philip N. Krasne =

American film producer

Philip Ned Krasne
- Born: May 6, 1905; Norfolk, Nebraska, US
- Died: September 18, 1999 (aged 94); Los Angeles, California, US
- Education: University of Michigan; USC Gould School of Law
- Occupations: Film and television producer
- Known for: Charlie Chan film series The Cisco Kid TV series The O. Henry Playhouse
- Spouse: Bernice F. Krasne (m. 1930–1997, her death)

Philip N. Krasne (May 6, 1905 – September 18, 1999) was an American attorney who became a film and television producer.

== Early years and education ==
Krasne was the son of Herman J. Krasne, a clothing merchant, and Rose Bernstein, Polish immigrants from Białystok. The youngest of three brothers, Philip graduated from Abraham Lincoln High School in Council Bluffs, Iowa, where Herman was an owner of People's Department Store. In 1927, Philip Krasne graduated from the University of Michigan, which awarded him both its Chicago Alumni Medal and Paul Gray Testimonial for excellence in oratory. He received his LLB degree from the University of Southern California School of Law. He was admitted to the bar in 1929.

== Producer ==
In 1936, Krasne began his motion picture career as vice-president in charge of production at Grand National Films Inc. In 1943 he teamed with James S. Burkett to produce features for Monogram Pictures: three with burlesque star Ann Corio, and three Charlie Chan mysteries. Burkett went on to produce the Chan pictures on his own, while Krasne initiated two more series for Monogram: musical westerns with Jimmy Wakely, and western adventures with Gilbert Roland as O. Henry's famous character The Cisco Kid.

Krasne retained the film rights to The Cisco Kid and produced another series of theatrical features for United Artists release, now starring Duncan Renaldo. Krasne brought The Cisco Kid to television, filming half-hour episodes of The Cisco Kid in color, again with Renaldo. This was before broadcasting in color was perfected, and Krasne shrewdly anticipated that the color shows would become more valuable in the future.

In 1952 Krasne joined former Universal Pictures producer Jack J. Gross to form Gross-Krasne, Inc, a pioneer American independent producer of television films. In November 1952 Gross-Krasne bought the California Studios (now the Raleigh Studios), where many of their productions were filmed. Gross-Krasne produced Big Town, Mayor of the Town and, perhaps the most noteworthy, The O. Henry Playhouse; Krasne was already on good terms with the O. Henry estate, having negotiated for the Cisco Kid rights.

In 1957, Krasne spent two months in Africa with Kenya Productions, Ltd, arranging the filming of two African television series, African Patrol and The Adventures of a Jungle Boy.

== Late life ==
Krasne produced his last film in 1974. He died in Los Angeles in 1999.

== Selected filmography ==
- Fighting Mad (1939)
- Crashing Thru (1939)
- Danger Ahead (1940)
- Murder on the Yukon (1940)
- The Sultan's Daughter (1943)
- Sarong Girl (1943)
- Song of the Range (1944)
- Charlie Chan in the Secret Service (1944)
- The Chinese Cat (1944)
- Black Magic (1944)
- The Valiant Hombre (1948)
- The Daring Caballero (1949)
- Satan's Cradle (1949)
- The Girl from San Lorenzo (1950)
- Pawnee (1957)
- The Boy Cried Murder (1966)
