= Muni Seroff =

Russian-Jewish actor (1895–1979)

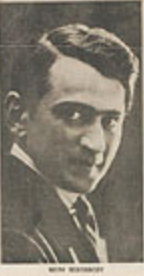
Muni Serebroff, on a 1935 theatre poster

Muni Seroff (January 8, 1895 - December 19, 1979) was a Jewish film and stage actor and singer (baritone) known for performing Russian and Jewish songs. He was born Chaim Leizerovich Zilberang (Ха́им Ле́йзерович Зильбера́нг), later known under the alias Munia Serebroff (Муня Серебров; archaic spelling: Серебровъ) (Note: Серебров derives from the word серебро, "silver", "Zilber" in Yiddish, hence Zilberang->Серебров), and eventually accepted the alias Mini Seroff.

He was born in Kishinev, Russian Empire to a family of a Jewish merchant.

He was buried at the Mount Hebron Cemetery (New York City).
