= Ann Corio =

American actress and burlesque performer (1909–1999)

- Corio c. 1944
- Born: Ann Coiro; November 29, 1909; Hartford, Connecticut, U.S.
- Died: March 1, 1999 (aged 89); Englewood, New Jersey, U.S.
- Occupations: Burlesque Performer; actress
- Years active: 1941–1979
- Spouses: Emmet R. Callahan (m. 1934; div. 1943) Bob Williams (m. 1944; div. 1953): Michael P. Iannucci

Ann Corio (born Ann Coiro; November 29, 1909 – March 1, 1999) was a prominent American burlesque stripper and actress. Her original surname was Coiro, changing it to Corio for stage purposes and because some family members did not approve of her profession.

== Biography ==
Born in Hartford, Connecticut, she was one of twelve children of Italian immigrant parents. While still in her teens, Corio's good looks and shapely physique landed her showgirl roles that led to her becoming a hugely popular striptease artist. Her rise to stardom as a featured performer began on the Mutual burlesque circuit in 1925. She later worked at Minsky's Burlesque in New York City and Boston's Old Howard Theatre.

== Career ==
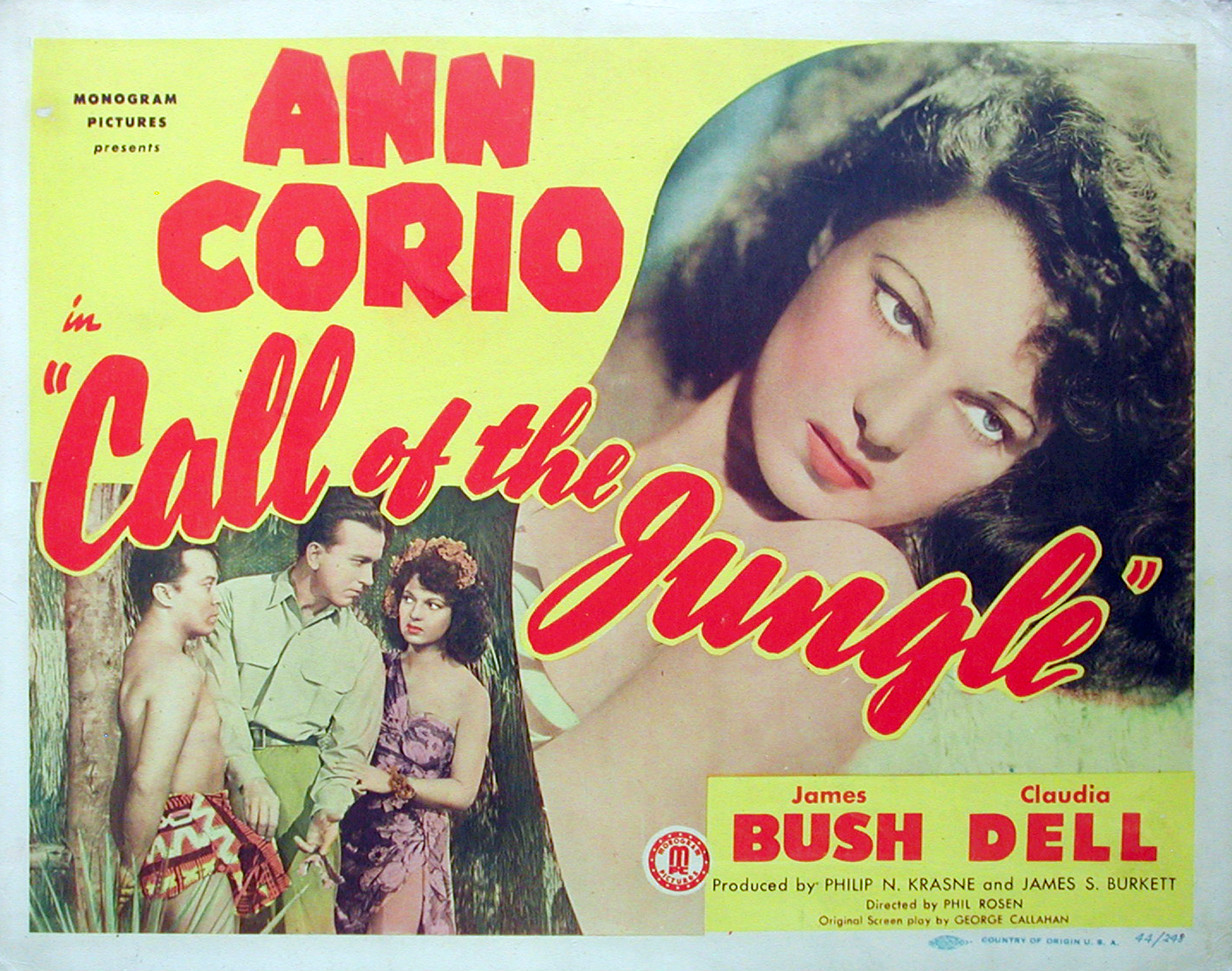
Call of the Jungle lobby card

After Mayor Fiorello La Guardia closed down New York City's burlesque houses in 1939, Corio made her way to Los Angeles. Between 1941 and 1944 she appeared in several Hollywood "B" motion pictures which featured her in scanty costumes (beginning with 1941 Swamp Woman), the best known of which was perhaps 1942's Jungle Siren opposite Buster Crabbe. In 1944 she made Call of the Jungle and Sarong Girl. A year earlier Corio was guest armchair detective on radio's The Adventures of Ellery Queen, on the January seventh episode entitled, "The Adventure of the Singing Rat". With the Second World War on, she became one of the volunteer pin-up girls for YANK magazine, appearing in the September 3, 1943, issue of the weekly U.S. Army publication. Corio visited the USS Yorktown, and a certified technician, Edward Hoegerman, said his favorite memory aboard the ship during the war is when she visited the radio shack. Corio appeared in "The Ghost in the Sea Blue Dress," the January 23, 1955 episode of NBC's Adventures of the Archers radio show,

Corio had a long successful career dancing on stage. In 1962 she put together the nostalgic off-Broadway show This Was Burlesque which she directed and in which also performed. In 1968, she wrote a book with the same title. Her fame was enduring enough that in the 1970s—when Corio was long retired and in her sixties—she twice was a guest on The Tonight Show Starring Johnny Carson. During this same period, she took This Was Burlesque out on the summer stock circuit for several seasons. In 1981, the show played Broadway at the old Latin Quarter, which was then known as the Princess Theatre, and tried to compete with Sugar Babies which was running just a few blocks up the street. In 1985, she mounted the show for the second to last time in downtown Los Angeles, at the Variety Arts Theatre, where it did not have a good run. A year or so later, the show played a dinner theatre in Florida, where it closed for good.

== Death ==
A resident of Cliffside Park, New Jersey, Corio died at Englewood Hospital and Medical Center in Englewood, New Jersey, on March 1, 1999, aged 89.

== Legacy ==
Corio is a member of the Hall of Fame at the Exotic World Burlesque Museum in Las Vegas, Nevada.

== See also ==
- Pin-ups of Yank, the Army Weekly
