= Duncan Renaldo =

Romanian-born American actor (1904–1980)

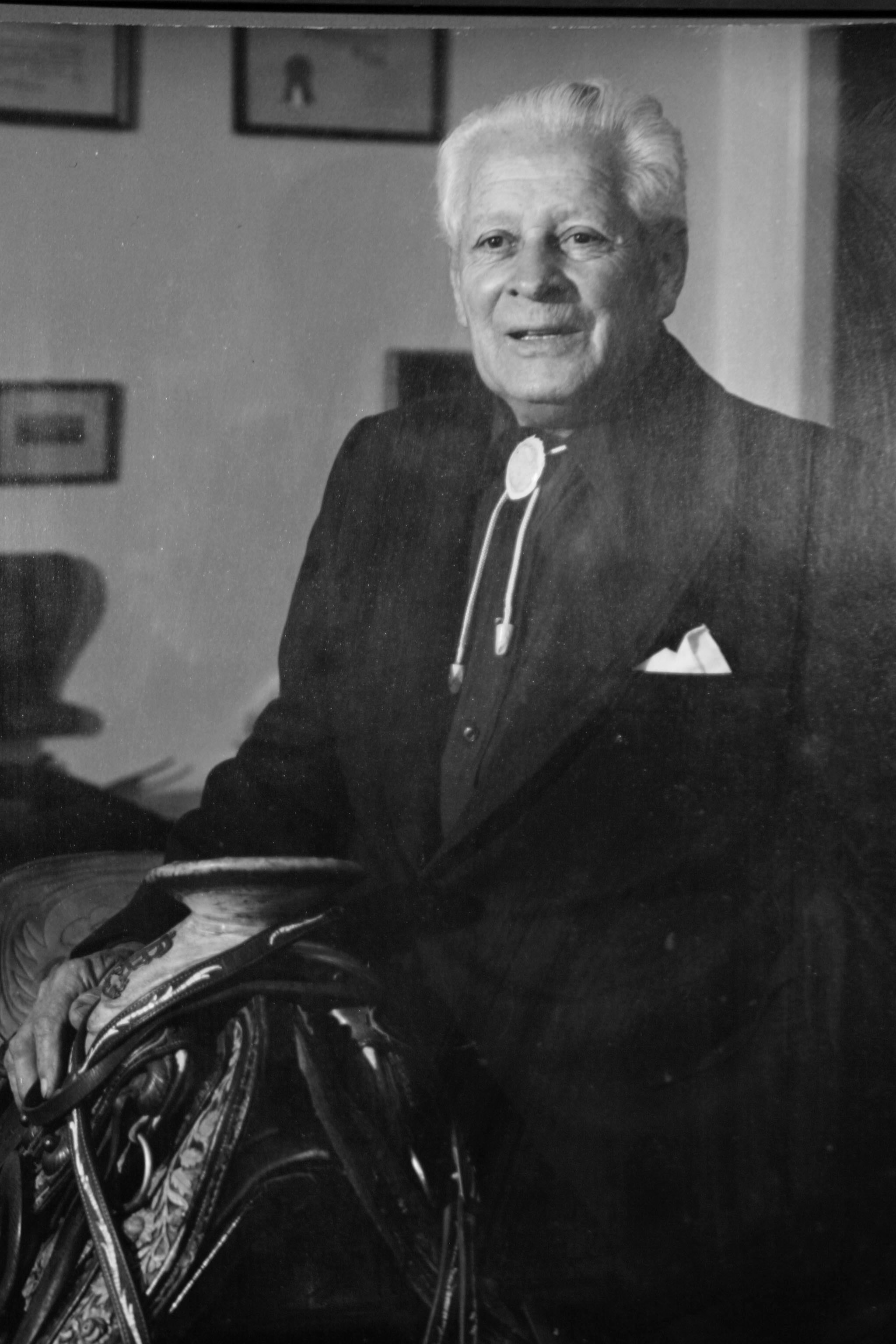
- Duncan Renaldo in his trophy room in Goleta, Calif., circa 1973–74.
- Born: Vasile Dumitru Cugheanos; April 23, 1904; Oancea, Galați County, Kingdom of Romania
- Died: September 3, 1980 (aged 76); Goleta, California, U.S.
- Resting place: Calvary Cemetery, Santa Barbara, California
- Years active: 1928–1980

Renault Renaldo Duncan (April 23, 1904 – September 3, 1980), better known as Duncan Renaldo, was a Romanian-born American actor best remembered for his portrayal of The Cisco Kid in films and on the 1950–1956 American TV series The Cisco Kid.

== Biography ==
=== Early years ===
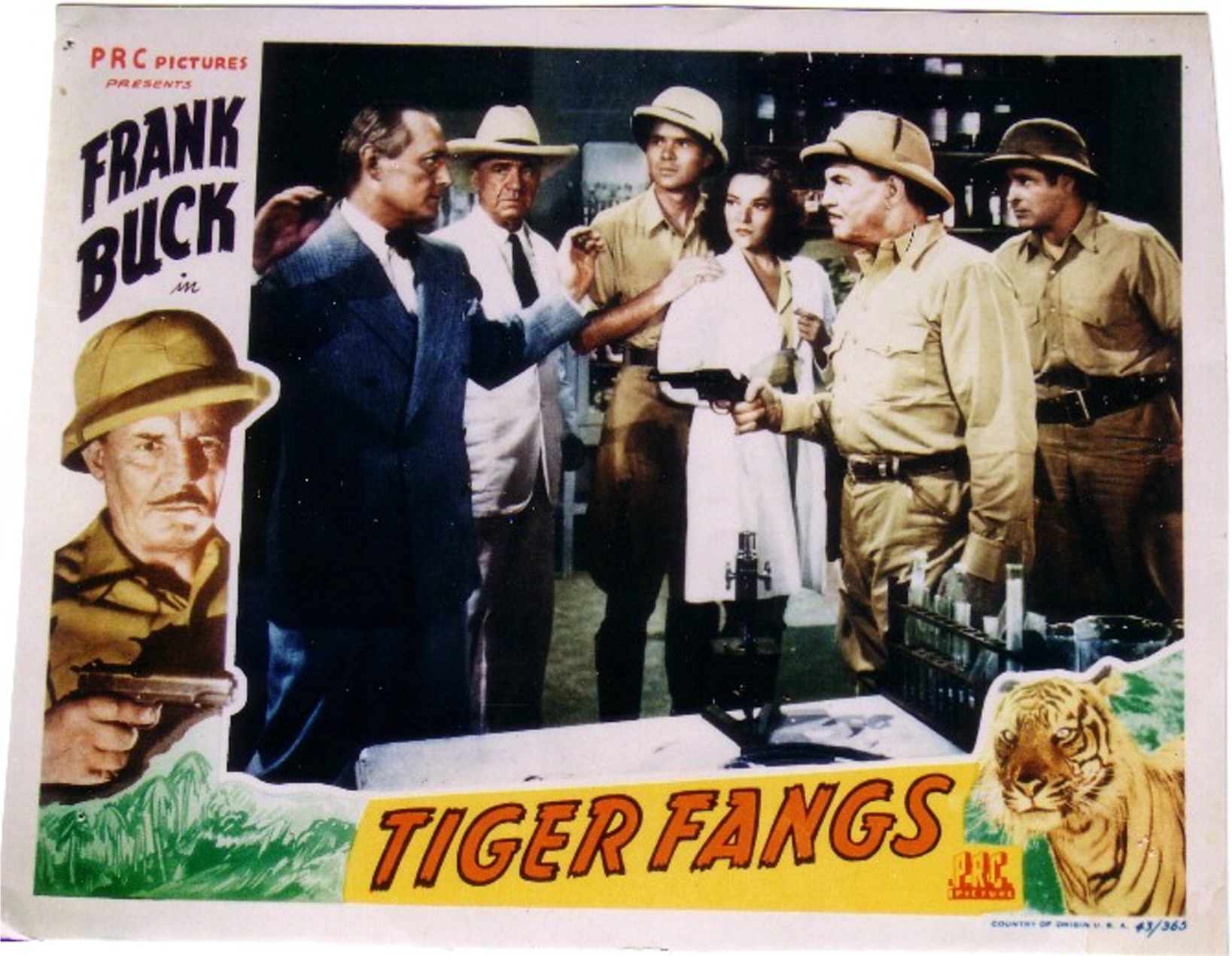
Movie poster for Tiger Fangs, left to right: Arno Frey, J. Farrell MacDonald, Howard Banks, June Duprez, Frank Buck, Duncan Renaldo

Renaldo told some interviewers that he actually did not know where he was born. The prosecution in his immigration case entered into evidence a copy of a birth certificate forwarded by the Romanian consul stating that he was born in Oancea, Romania, as Vasile Dumitru Cugheanos, the natural son of Dumitru and Teodora Cugheanos. Renaldo claimed in his defense that he was born in Camden, New Jersey, and only later raised in Romania as Basil Couyanos by people whom he sometimes referred to as "mother" and "father", but at other times by their Christian names, Demetri and Theodora.

Renaldo claimed never to have known his biological parents and to have been raised in several European countries. He emigrated to America in the 1920s. He claimed Romanian nationality when he took a job on a French freighter and entered the United States in 1917, registering as a foreign seaman; in court records, he claimed that this occurred four years later in 1921, but the prosecution produced evidence that he was listed as a coal passer on the S.S. Puget Sound in 1917 and first entered the United States when this ship landed at Baltimore, Maryland, that year. Failing to support himself as a portrait painter, he tried producing short films. He eventually took up acting and signed with Metro-Goldwyn-Mayer in 1928, where he worked in at least two major films, The Bridge of San Luis Rey and Trader Horn. In January 1933, Renaldo was sentenced to serve two years in federal prison and fined $2000 on conviction of falsely claiming American citizenship, falsifying a passport, and perjury, but he eventually was pardoned by President Franklin D. Roosevelt and returned to acting.

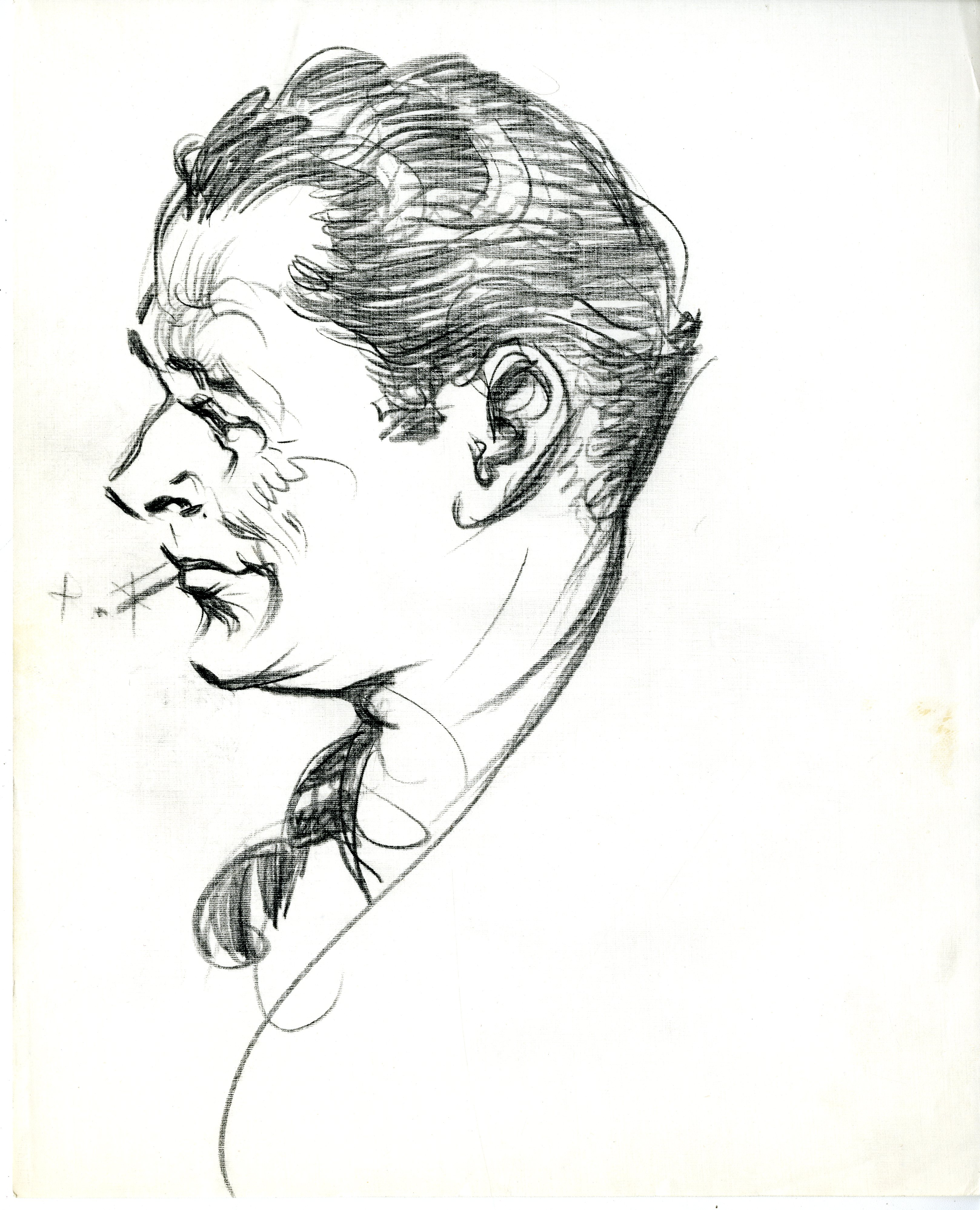
Duncan Renaldo drawing by Manuel Rosenberg

Renaldo found minor roles at Republic Studios and other Poverty Row studios until he persuaded Republic head Herbert Yates in 1939 to introduce a Latin cowboy into The Three Mesquiteers series. The character only lasted a year, though, and Renaldo was back to minor roles in B-films, for example Tiger Fangs (1943). Renaldo did play some roles in mainstream films, as well, including Spawn of the North (1938) with George Raft, Henry Fonda, and John Barrymore and For Whom the Bell Tolls with Gary Cooper and Ingrid Bergman. He was also a producer, writer, and director.

=== Television star ===
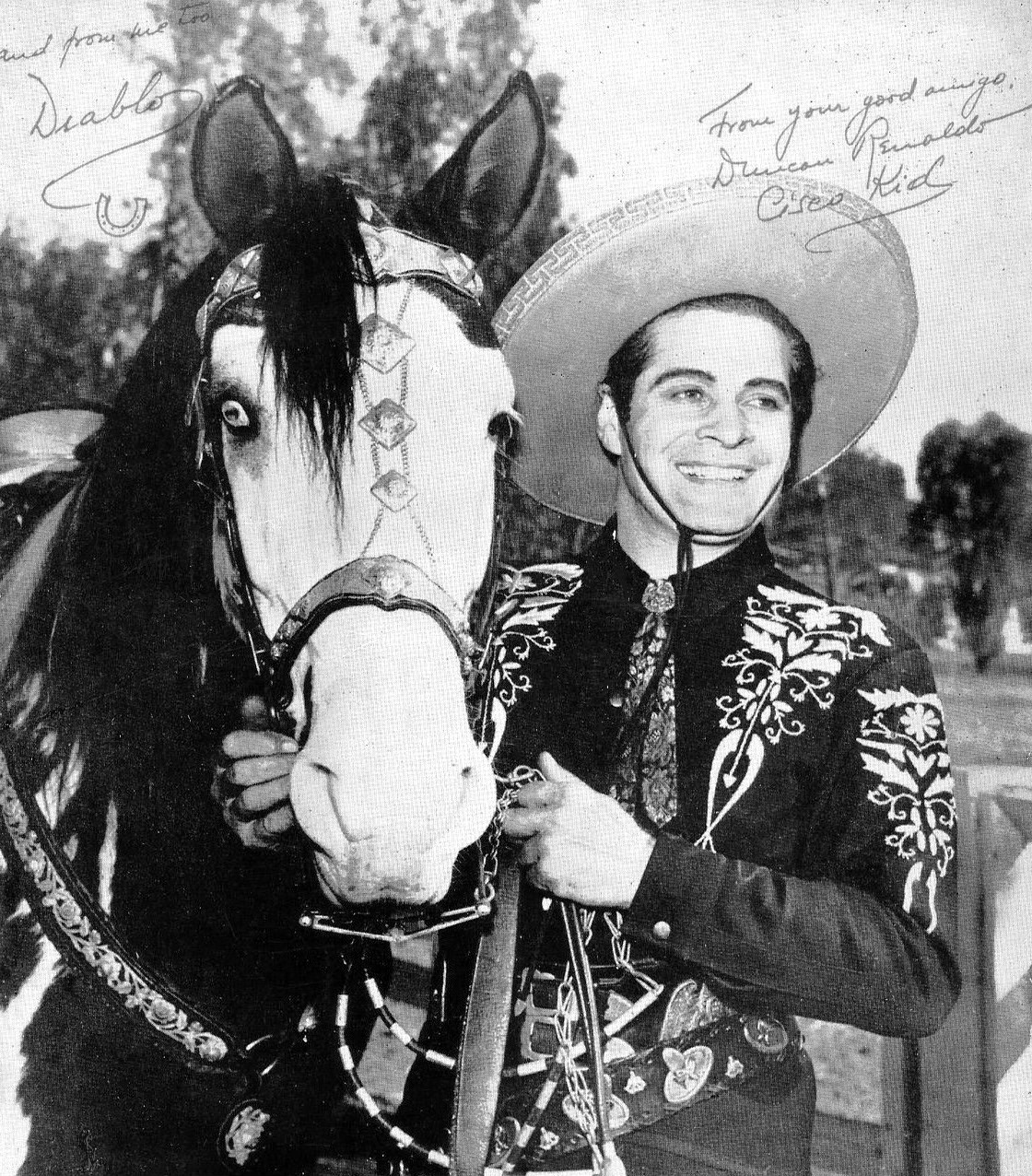
Renaldo as the Cisco Kid with Diablo

In the late 1940s, Renaldo starred in several Hollywood Westerns as the Cisco Kid, and in 1950, he began playing the role in a popular television series that ran until 1956. In the age of black-and-white television, the show was filmed in color. As Cisco, Renaldo roamed the Old West on a black-and-white horse named Diablo, accompanied by his constant companion Pancho, played by Leo Carrillo, who was 24 years Renaldo's senior.

Renaldo illustrated a book of poetry by Moreton B. Price titled Drifter's Dreams. His illustrations are ink sketches of idyllic scenes, primarily seascapes and landscapes. He also painted in oils. Two of his large paintings of members of the Maasai tribe whom he met in Kenya while filming Trader Horn were prominently displayed in his Santa Barbara home in 1971.

=== Death ===
Renaldo died of lung cancer in 1980, aged 76, in Goleta, California. His interment took place in Calvary Cemetery in Santa Barbara, California.

== Legacy ==
For his contributions to the television industry, Renaldo has a star on the Hollywood Walk of Fame at 1680 Vine Street. He is pictured with the band War on their 1974 album War Live, which includes the group's 1973 song "The Cisco Kid".

== Partial filmography ==
- The Trail Beyond. Starring John Wayne 1934
- Lady Luck (1936)
- Rose of the Rio Grande (1938)
- Down Mexico Way (1941)
- Call of the South Seas (1944)
- Two Years Before the Mast (1946)

== See also ==
- List of people pardoned or granted clemency by the president of the United States
