= The Cisco Kid (disambiguation) =

The Cisco Kid is a fictional character found in numerous film, radio, television and comic book series, created by O. Henry.

The Cisco Kid may also refer to:

- The Cisco Kid (1931 film), an American pre-Code Western film
- The Cisco Kid (1994 film), an American Western comedy TV movie
- The Cisco Kid (TV series), a 1950–1956 American Western television series
- The Cisco Kid (album), a 1973 album by Reuben Wilson
- The Cisco Kid (song), a 1973 song by War
- Cisco Kid, a song by Sublime from the album Robbin' the Hood
