= Gus Schirmer =

Gus Schirmer may refer to:

- G. Schirmer, Inc., an American classical music publishing company, founded by Gustav Schirmer
- Gustav Schirmer (1829–1893), German-American music publisher
- Gus Schirmer Jr. (1918–1992), director, producer, and talent agent in film and theatre
