= Hans Heinsheimer =

German-American music publisher and author (1900–1993)

- Heinsheimer in 1963
- Born: Hans Walter Heinsheimer; September 25, 1900; Karlsruhe, German Empire
- Died: October 12, 1993 (aged 93); New York City, U.S.
- Resting place: Ferncliff Cemetery
- Citizenship: Germany (1900-1938) United States (1944-1993)
- Education: Heidelberg University
- Known for: Music publishing
- Spouse: Elsbeth Heinsheimer (m. 1938)

Hans Walter Heinsheimer (September 25, 1900 – October 12, 1993) was a music publisher, author, and journalist. George Antheil describes him as having an important role in the development of opera in Central Europe between World War I and World War II. "To him", Antheil writes, "Germany owed much of her new brilliant opera renaissance", including Kurt Weill's The Threepenny Opera. As a music publisher and promoter of music, Heinsheimer had worked with Béla Bartók, Igor Stravinsky, Samuel Barber, Aaron Copland, Zoltán Kodály, George Antheil, Leonard Bernstein, Alban Berg, Leoš Janáček, and Ernst Krenek.

== Life and work ==
Heinsheimer was born in Karlsruhe; Germany. After attending law school and obtaining a law degree (circa 1918-1923) and working as an unpaid intern, he was hired at age 23 by the grand rights (staged works) division of Viennese music publisher Universal Edition, eventually becoming head of the opera department from 1924-1938. There he supported composers Alban Berg and Leoš Janáček and wrote many articles for the music periodical Anbruch [Dawn] about issues in the music industry and the sociology of music. He was the force behind Universal's hugely popular successes in the 1920s:

- Jaromír Weinberger's opera Schwanda the Bagpiper
- Alban Berg's 1925 opera Wozzeck
- Ernst Krenek's Jonny spielt auf

He also dabbled as a stage director, including productions of Kurt Weill's Rise and Fall of the City of Mahagonny.

He was on a business trip to New York City during the Austrian Anschluss in 1938 and did not return to Austria. He found employment with the major music publisher Boosey & Hawkes and was instrumental in Boosey's publication of the works of Béla Bartók, who emigrated in 1940. Heinsheimer supported the impoverished composer – whose leukemia contributed to increasingly poor health – through a conspiracy to channel funds disguised as record royalties. At Boosey, he promoted the performance of Aaron Copland's El Salón México.

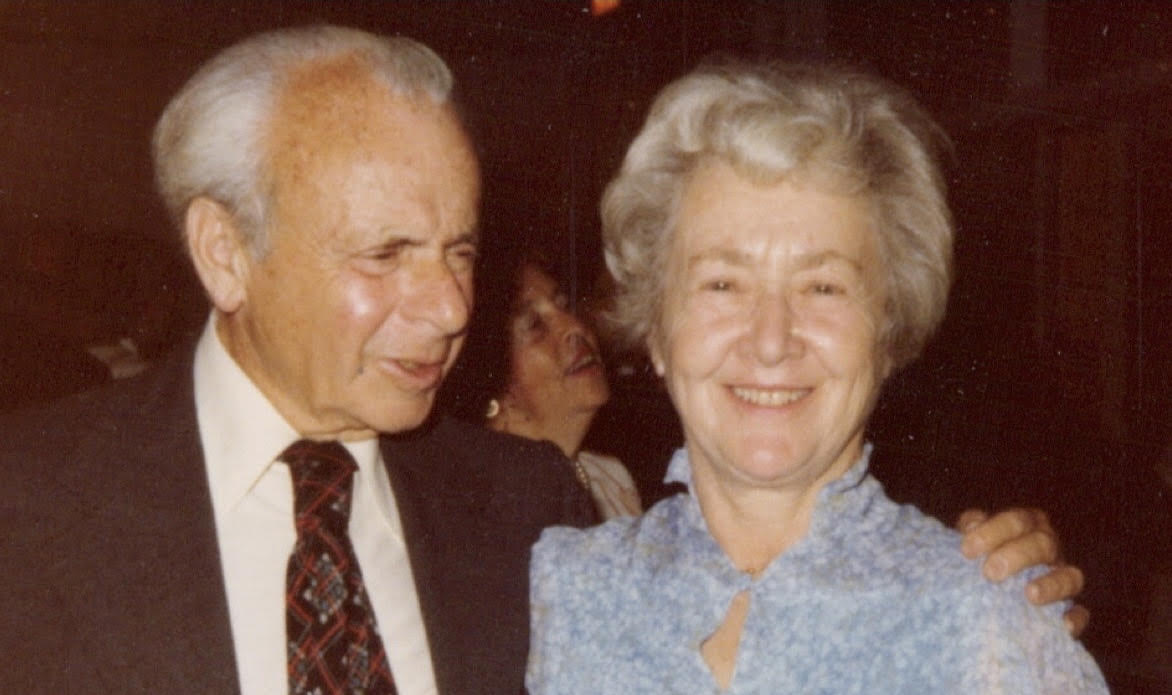
Heinsheimer and his wife, Elsbeth (1974)

According to Bernard Holland, Heinsheimer was dismissed from Boosey in 1947 because the current head of the firm (Boosey & Hawkes), Ralph Hawkes, disliked his first book, Menagerie in F Sharp. Heinsheimer went to work for the largest American music publisher at the time, G. Schirmer, Inc., becoming its vice-president in 1972. He managed the publications of composers including Leonard Bernstein, Gian Carlo Menotti, and Samuel Barber, and also brought out Albert Schweitzer's edition of Bach's organ works. He died in New York, and was described in his New York Times obituary as "One of the most influential classical-music publishers of the 20th century."

== Works ==
He wrote Best Regards to Aida (1968), a biography of music publishers. This and his other memoirs are important biographical sources of information about 20th-century composers. His Menagerie in F Sharp also gives a first-hand account of Nazi opposition to the music of Alban Berg, Kurt Weill and others, who were accused of Kulturbolschewism and "branded as Boshevists, Communists, enemies of the state," with performance of their music forbidden. After his retirement in 1977, he contributed many articles to the supplement to first edition of the large German music encyclopedia, Die Musik in Geschichte und Gegenwart. Also, in his retirement, he made many special contributions to the arts section (Feuilleton) of the Frankfurter Allgemeine Zeitung (FAZ).

== Books ==
Heinsheimer wrote the following books from 1947 to 1968:

- Menagerie in F-Sharp (New York, 1947) at the Internet Archive
- 3 Briefe an Kurt Leimer (1949): co-author with Kurt Leimer, Gustave Schirmer (son of Gustav Schirmer), and Rudolph Schirmer
- Fanfare for Two Pigeons (New York, 1952)
- Best Regards to Aida (New York, 1968)
