= Rudolph E. Schirmer Sr. =

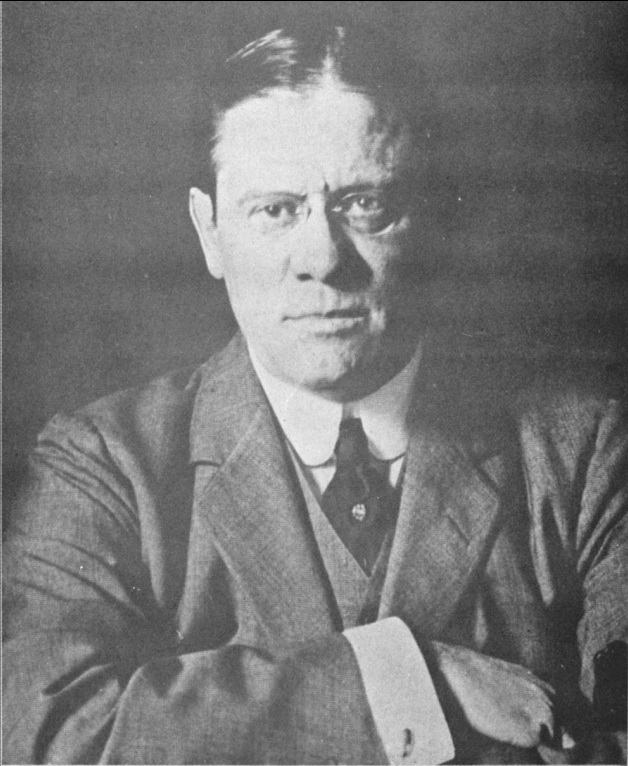
- Schirmer in 1919
- Born: July 22, 1859
- Died: August 20, 1919 (aged 60)
- Occupations: President of G. Schirmer; The Musical Quarterly (one of the founders)
- Spouse(s): Martha Y. Barnes; Ann Swinburne Munroe
- Children: Rudolph Edward Schirmer Jr.
- Father: Gustav Schirmer
- Relatives: Iris Flores (daughter-in-law)

Rudolph E. Schirmer (1859-1919) was the president of G. Schirmer, Incorporated, an American classical music publishing company and founder of the journal The Musical Quarterly, the oldest American academic journal on music. (Note: In the journal's 1919 memoriam to Schirmer, The Musical Quarterly refers to him as the founder of the journal.)

== Early life ==
Schirmer was born in New York City, New York on July 22, 1859. His father was Gustav Schirmer, the founder of G. Schirmer music publishing. Schirmer attended private schools in New York as well as Weimar, Germany. In Weimar, as young student, he knew Franz Liszt (1811-1886).

In 1880, Schirmer graduated with a B.A. from Princeton University. In 1884, he graduated with a L.L.B. from Columbia Law School and become a member of the New York Bar Association in the same year. With his law degree, Schirmer and his brother Gustave Schirmer (1864–1907) worked at G. Schirmer and would eventually run the company that their father had created in 1866.

In 1915, he had conceived of and had developed, in cooperation with librarian, editor, and musicologist Oscar Sonneck (1873-1928, editor 1915-1928), The Musical Quarterly.

== Philanthropy ==
He donated the Circulating Library of Music, which had been created by his father G. Schirmer, to the Institute of Musical Art (IMA). (Note: The Institute of Music (1905-1926) would later merge with the Juilliard Graduate School to become the Juilliard School of Music (1926-1968) and would then become known, in 1968, by its current name of the Juilliard School of Performing Arts in New York City.)

== Personal life ==
In 1888, Schirmer married Martha Y. Barnes. (Note: Barnes, as a philanthropist, assisted with the foundation of the settlement school known as the Settlement Music School as well the Neighborhood Music School, which would later become the Manhattan School of Music.) They later filed for divorce on March 16, 1916. As part of the divorce agreement, a trust was created for Barnes with one of the trustees being Otto Sonneck, the editor of the G. Schirmer publication launched in the previous year of 1915, The Musical Quarterly. After the divorce, Schirmer married, later in that year, singer and socialite Ann Swinburne Munroe. In 1919, they had a son, Rudolph Schirmer Jr.. In that same year, Schirmer died in Santa Barbara, California of a heart attack at age 60, shortly after the birth of his son. Ann Swinburne would go on to serve as director of G. Schirmer. Schirmer's last will and testament had stated the following:

- Ann Swinburne was to be granted Schirmer's financial interest in G. Schirmer until she remarries.
- The same financial interest transfers to their son once he turns 21-years of age.
- The deed of trust created for Martha Barnes Schirmer was to be carried out.

== Gallery ==
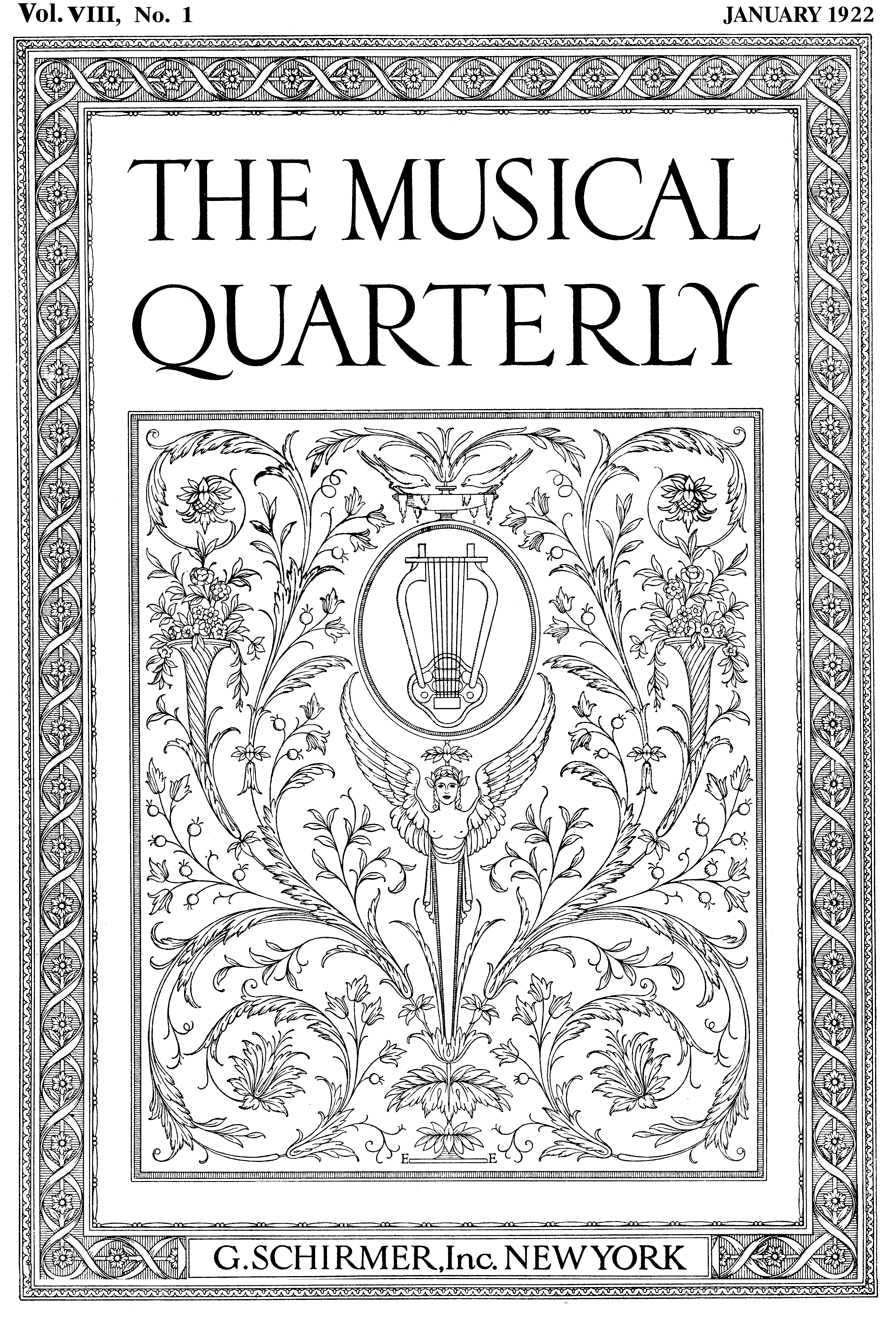
Cover of The Musical Quarterly (1922)

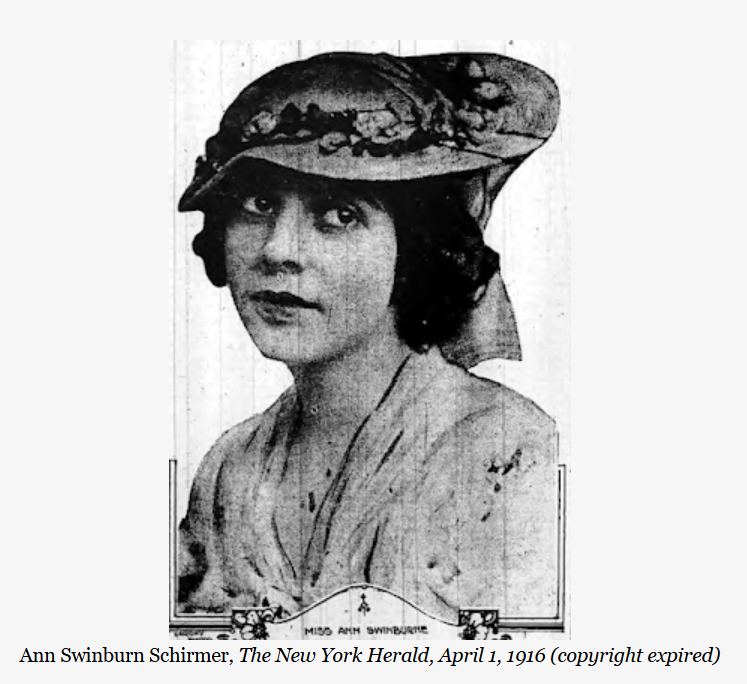
Ann Swinburne Schirmer in 1916

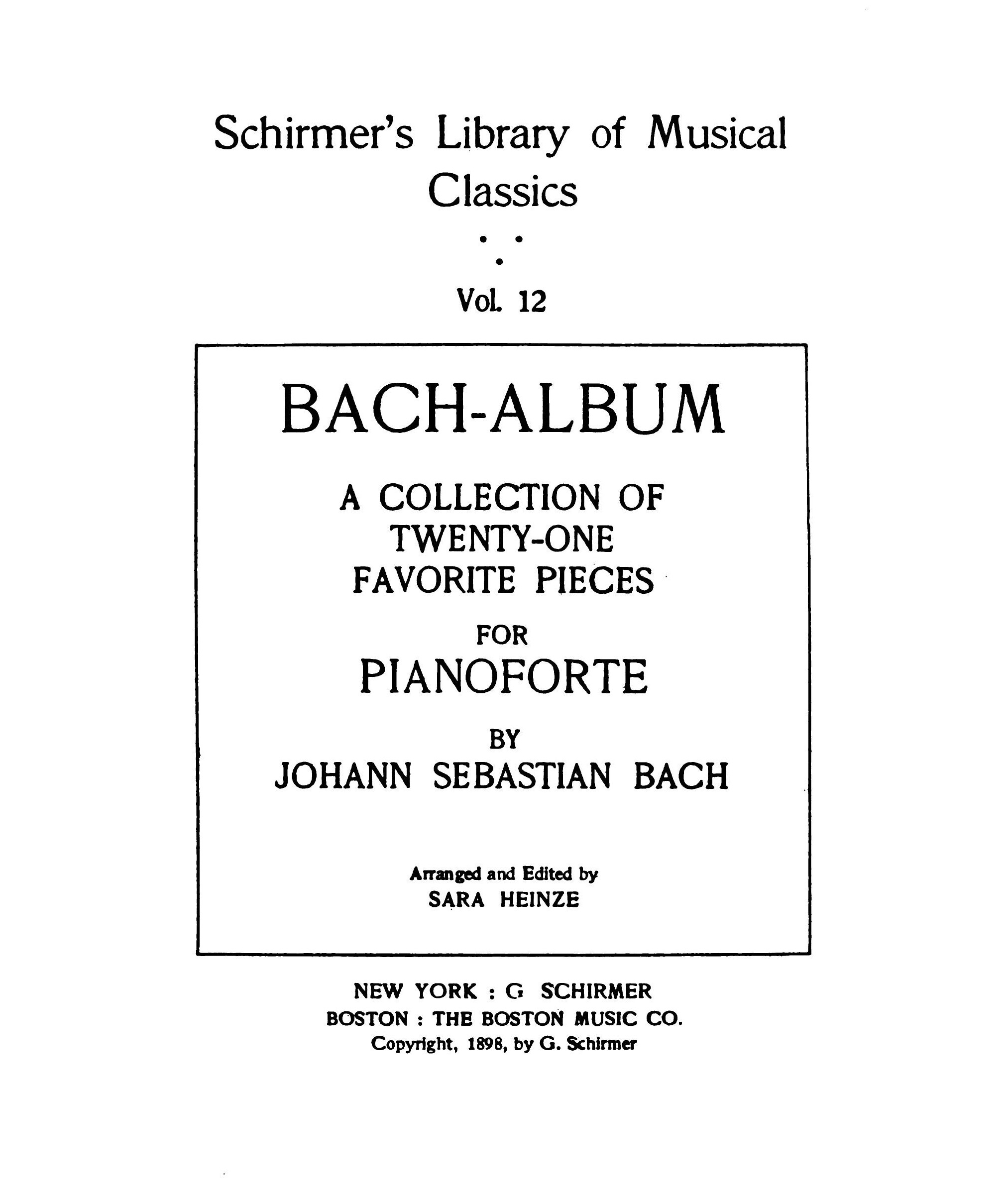
The G. Schirmer publication of the Bach-Album from the Schirmer's Library of Musical Classics (1898)

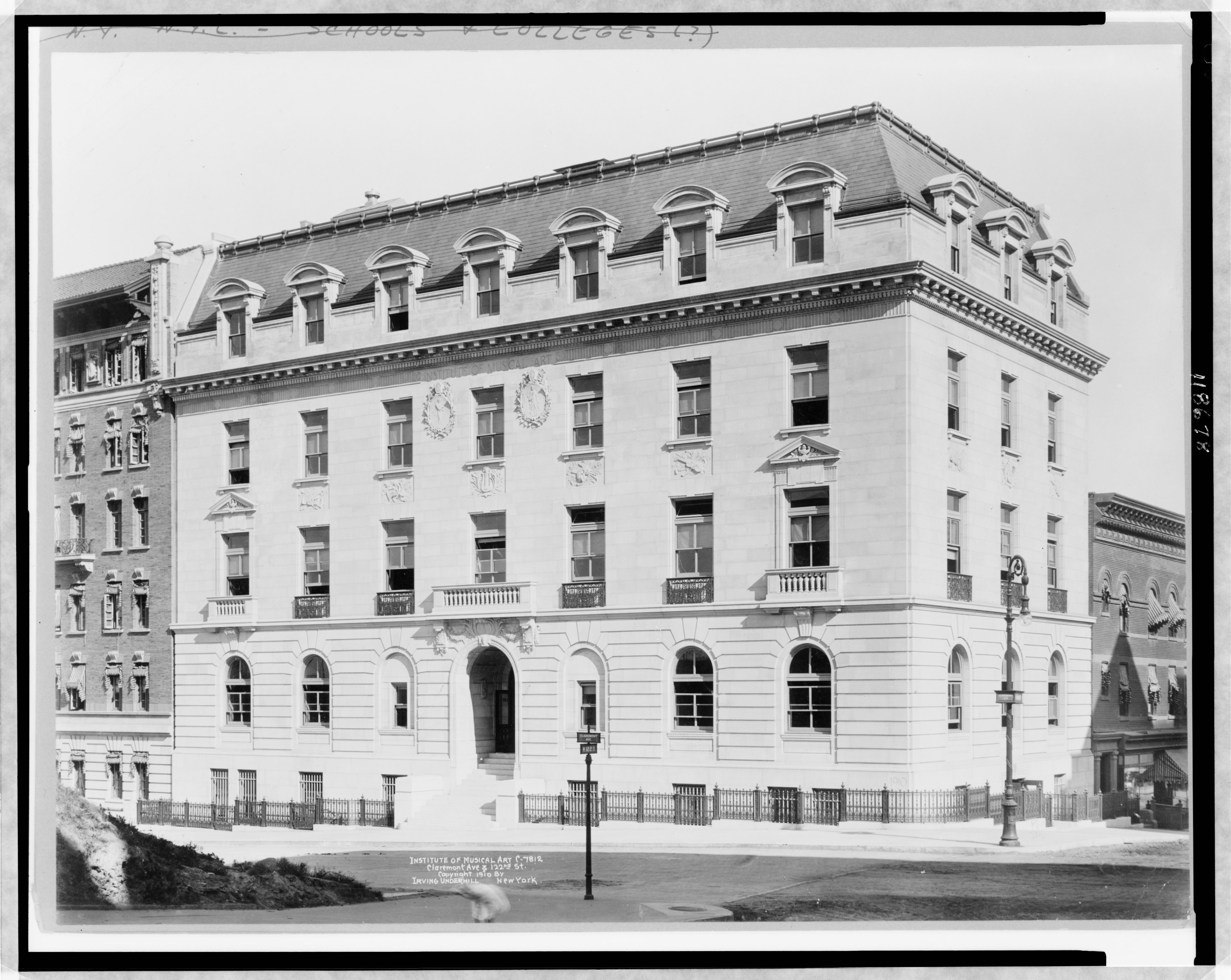
The Institute of Musical Arts (1910)
