= Nacho Galindo =

Nacho Galindo may refer to:

- Nacho Galindo (actor) (1908–1973), Mexican-American actor
- Nacho Galindo (singer) (born 1959), Mexican singer and bassist

== See also ==
- Ignacio Galindo (disambiguation)
