= Iris Flores (actress and inventor) =

Film actress and inventor

- Born: August 8, 1921; San Jose, Costa Rica
- Died: April 16, 2016 (aged 94)
- Occupations: Actress; inventor
- Years active: 1943–1956
- Known for: Ride the Pink Horse (1947); Women in the Night (1948); South of Monterey (1946); Various inventions
- Spouses: Frederick Tillinghast III; Rudolph Schirmer (1958-1970)
- Children: Liane Schirmer
- Relatives: Rafael Yglesias Castro (grandfather)

Iris Maria de la Trinidad Flores (1921–2016) was an inventor and actress born on 8 August 1921 in San José, Costa Rica. She was a film actress, known for Ride the Pink Horse (1947), Women in the Night (1948), and South of Monterey (1946). In 1952, she held a U.S. patent for a brassiere she had co-invented with Juliet Kellard. Starting forty years after the patent was published, a variety of patents cited her 1952 patent. The latest published patent citing her work was published in 2016. She later developed other patents in the fashion industry in the 1950s.

She was the granddaughter of the former president of Costa Rica, Rafael Yglesias Castro, and the great-granddaughter of José María Castro Madriz, the first president of Costa Rica.

== Acting career ==
Flores was in a variety of films from 1943 to 1948 and had acted in both films from Mexico and the United States.

In 1943, she was in the Mexican film Tres Hermanos, which starred Abel Salazar, was directed by José Benavides, and with music composed by Max Urban. The screenplay was co-written by Salazar and Benavides. Also in the 1943, she was in the U.S. musical comedy film Thank Your Lucky Stars by David Butler. (Note: The film was a musical that also functioned as a fundraiser for the Hollywood Canteen, which was a former entertainment venue based in Hollywood, Los Angeles, California for military personnel during World War II.) Flores was in the Good Night, Good Neighbor scene. "Good Neighbor" was a reference to the U.S. Good Neighbor policy at that time with Latin America (Note: The title of the scene was a play on the official U.S. Good Neighbor Policy (Política de Buena Vecindad) of cooperation with Latin America, which was encouraged by President Hoover and President Roosevelt at that time.) For the musical number scene, Flores was joined with the following cast members:

- Esperanza Dominquez, daughter of Maximiliano Hernandez Martinez who was President of El Salvador at that time.
- Maruca Sacasa, daughter of Dr. Juan B. Sacasa who was the former President of Nicaragua and the former ambassador from that country to the United States.

Following that, she played a minor character in the musical film Mexicana (1945), which was another film in line with the U.S. Good Neighbor policy. In the following year, she was in two of William Nigh's Cisco Kid films, a 1940s American Western genre, with Gilbert Roland as the Cisco Kid. She was introduced in the first Cisco Kid film, The Gay Cavalier (1946). In the same year, she returns to the film series as Carmelita in South of Monterey (1946). As Carmelita, she also sang two songs in the film with music by Edward J. Kay and lyrics by Gladys Flores. (Note: Glady Flores was a composer of a variety of songs at that time, and in the following year would compose a song with Deciser Josf Vecsei.) In 1947, she was Maria in the film noir set in rural New Mexico, Robert Montgomery's Ride the Pink Horse. In the following year, she was María González in the World War II science fiction drama Women in the Night by William Roland. The film was set in Shanghai, China, at the end of World War II, and was filmed at the Playa Ensenada Hotel in Ensenada, Baja California, Mexico

== Inventions ==
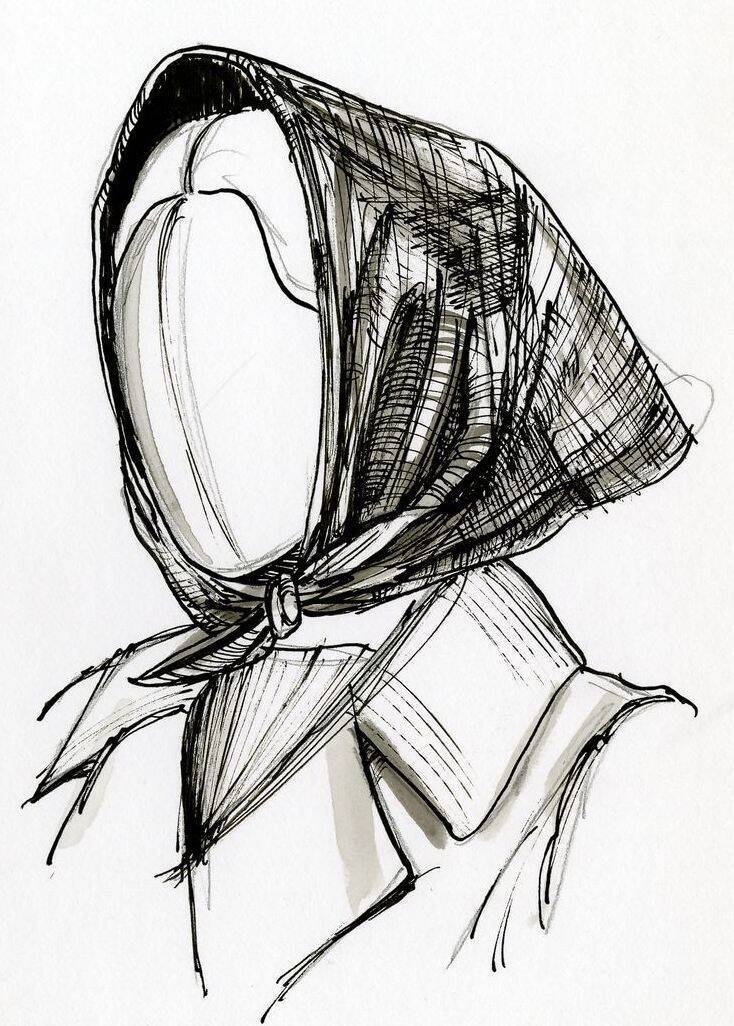
Sample of a Scarf The first garment patent Flores had been involved in was for as assignor for a design patent for a new type of scarf, as Iris Flores Tillinghast from the time of her first marriage.

Flores held the following patents and/or patent assignments:

Inventions
Device	Year Patented	Inventor(s)	Assignor
Boetschi scarf (Design Patent)	1951 (Filed 1949)	Rene Boetschi	50% to Iris Flores Tillinghast (Her name from her first marriage)
Brassiere	1952	Iris Flores, Juliet Kellard	Individual
Combination skirt, cape, and blouse (Design Patent)	1954	Iris Flores	Michael P. Grace II
Brassiere shaper	1956	Iris Flores	Sarong Inc.

The Boetschi scarf patent was an ornamental design, and the brassiere patent was an invention in structure and manufacturing. The brassiere patent differentiated itself from prior technology which supported the cups of the brassiere from above and, instead, supported the cup where "the support is effective down to and including the lower edge of the brassiere". The brassiere patent was developed in collaboration with Juliet Kellard (Note: Juliet Kellard would later patent another fashion technology with her patent Needle Feed Mechanism for Sewing Machines) and is described as the following in the patent document:

The invention also has for its objects to provide such means that are positive in operation, convenient in use, easily installed in working position and easily disconnected therefrom, economical of manufacture, relatively simple, and general superiority and serviceability.

The design patent documentation for the combination skirt, cape, and blouse refers to an earlier 1937 patent application by Edith Folltz for an outdoor skirt.

Forty years after the 1952 brassiere patent was published, it was cited in the following variety of patent applications:

Citation for Brassiere Patent by Flores and Kellard (1952)
Patent Application	Publication Year	Assignee	Application
US5171182A	1992	Wacoal America, Inc.	Camisole brassiere
US5782672A	1998	Vickie G. Woodley	Nipple pad
US5820444A	1998	Eleanor F. McGaughey	Post surgical brassiere
US20060046616A1	2006	Alessi V. Christine	Undergarment for lactating women
US20160338423A1	2016	Edelweiss Basics Gmbh & Co. Kg	Brassiere with a concealing element

Like the scarf patent, the 1954 combination skirt, cape, and blouse patent was also an ornamental design. It was assigned to composer and Broadway producer Michael P. Grace II.

The 1956 Brassiere shaper was assigned by the inventor Flores to the assignor Sarong Incorporated, which had manufactured the Sarong brand of brassieres and was the assignor of multiple patents from various countries. Sarong was the company that had applied for the patent. It is classified by the U.S. Patent Office as Machines, appliances, or methods for manufacturing corsets or brassieres (A41C5/00). This patent was later cited by International Playtex for their 1974 patent for the construction of knitted brassiere blanks and brassieres. Along with the International Playtex patent, the brassiere shaper patent was cited by 12 patents altogether from 1955 to 2013.

== Senate hearings ==
=== Background ===
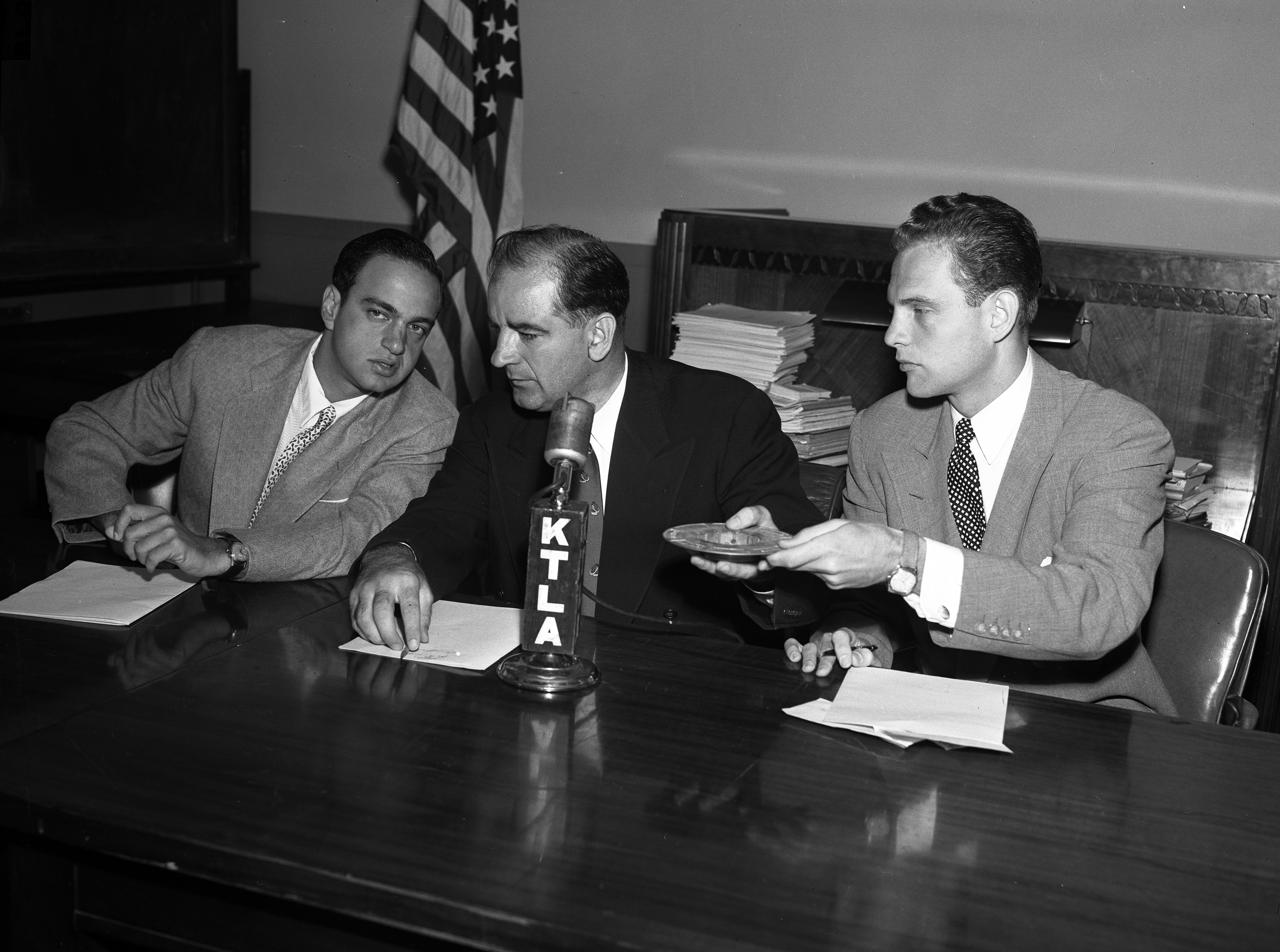
Members of the subcommittee: Joseph McCarthy with Roy M. Cohn and George David Schine

In the 1950s, Flores spoke before a Senate subcommittee because she knew Gerard David Schine, who was a chief consultant the Permanent Subcommittee on Investigations of the U.S. Senate. (Note: Schine had been drafted into the U.S. Army as a private, while employed at the subcommittee at the same time. Flores was asked by the subcommittee about Schine's work schedule when he left the military base on weekends.) The Senate hearings addressed Schine had sought special privileges while in the U.S. Armed Forces. (Note: However, McCarthy suspected that the Army had drafted Schine in order to interfere with the investigation of if there were members of a communist party in the Department of Defense. McCarthy's subcommittee actually wanted to establish that Schine, who served on the subcommittee, was working for the subcommittee on administrative issues on the weekends and so on when he had time away from the Army.) Although Flores was a former actress and speaking before the McCarthy committee, the hearing was only for her testimony on a work schedule for someone employed by the subcommittee and who was employed in the U.S. Army at the same time.

=== Subcommittee hearing and testimony about being an inventor ===
In 1954, the Army-McCarthy hearings requested for Flores to be interviewed about her knowledge of U.S. Army Private Gerard David Schine, who had been a member of the subcommittee staff. When asked about her occupation, she replied that was an inventor and that she had sold her brassiere invention to I. Newman and Company. (Note: I. Newman & Sons, Incorporated was a company that had originally made corsets before it had transitioned to the development of brassiere technology.) She also mentioned that DuPont has been working with her on the device, with a staff member from the multinational chemical company and a brassiere designer the company had hired. The event was covered by multiple U.S. newspapers at the that time.

== Personal life ==
On October 4, 1946, she married Frederick Tillinghast III. According to a newspaper article from that time, Mr. Tillinghast III was a merchandise broker at that time. (Note: The article also described their home in Albany, New York. The assignment of a U.S. patent to Frederich Tillingham of Albany took place in 1894. However, it is not clear if he was Frederick's great uncle or grandfather. Flores would later enter the world of patents by means of being assigned a patent.) They were later divorced.

On February 8, 1958, she was married to composer and music publisher Rudolph Edward Schirmer Jr. in New York City. (Note: Schirmer was a composer, poet, and music publishing executive who had worked in the U.S. Military Intelligence Service during the war in a unit called the Ritchie Boys, which was a unit that consisted of German-speaking personnel for roles in counterintelligence in Europe, translating key information from German prisoners of war (POW), and related services.) (Note: With their marriage, singer and socialite Ann Swinburne Munroe was the mother-in-law of Flores.)

While they were married, her husband wrote and her brother, Fernando Flores, wrote the Spanish text for Hymn to the Americas (Himno a las Americas in Spanish), which was for a four-part chorus of mixed voices with a soprano solo and piano accompaniment. (Note: Fernando Flores was the former consul general to the Government of Costa Rica.) The composition was performed by the Washington National Symphony at the Fourth Inter-American Music Festival in 1968. Their daughter is Liane Schirmer. They were later divorced in March 1970.

== Filmography ==
Title	Year	Role
Thank Your Lucky Stars	1943	Cast member for Good Night, Good Neighbor number
South of Monterey	1946	Carmelita
The Gay Cavalier	1946	Fisherman's wife
Ride the Pink Horse	1947	Maria
Women in the Night	1948	Maria Gonzalez

Partial soundtrack for South of Monterey (1946)
Title	Year	Lyrics	Music	Vocals
"Tacos de Amor"	1946	Gladys Flores	Edward J. Kay	Iris Flores
"Tu Chulita"	1946	Gladys Flores	Edwin J. Kay	Iris Flores
