= Bertha King Benkard =

American art collector

- Born: Bertha King Bartlett; 1870s New York, U.S.
- Died: August 8, 1945; Oyster Bay, New York, U.S.
- Occupation(s): Art collector, philanthropist, clubwoman
- Father: Franklin Bartlett
- Relatives: Ann Swinburne Munroe (sister-in-law); Julia Lynch Olin (sister-in-law)

Bertha King Bartlett Benkard (1870s – August 8, 1945) was an American clubwoman and art collector. She was president general of the Colonial Dames of America, and an expert on antique furniture. A room at the Metropolitan Museum of Art is named for her.

== Early life and education ==
Bertha King Bartlett was born in New York, the daughter of Franklin Bartlett and Bertha King Post Bartlett. Her father was a lawyer and a Congressman; her uncle was judge Willard Bartlett of the New York Court of Appeals.

== Career ==
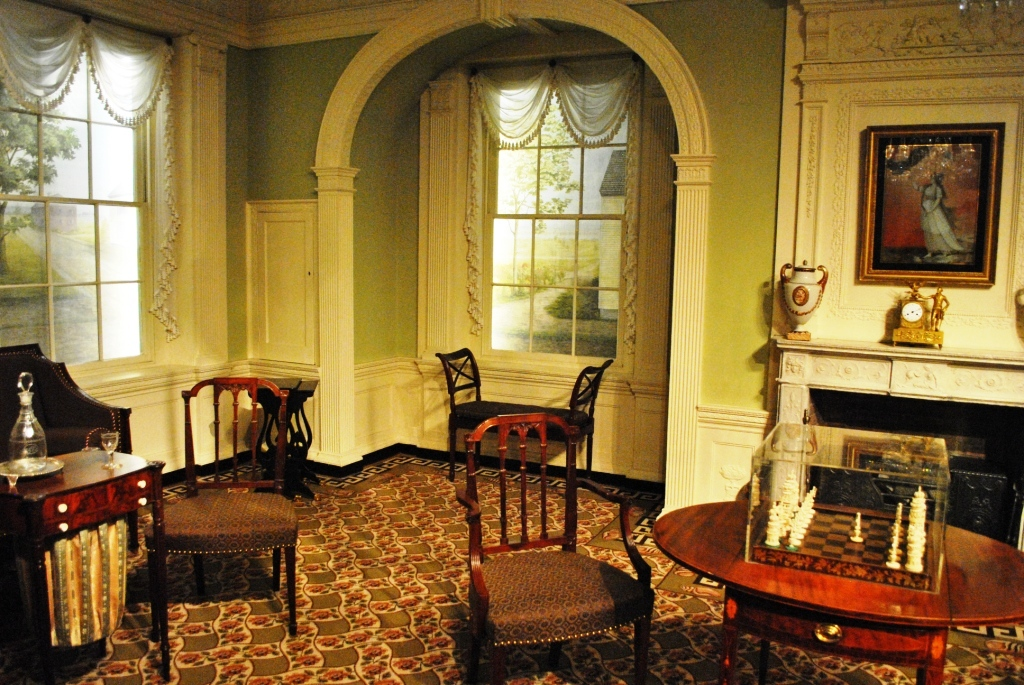
The Benkard Room at the Metropolitan Museum of Art was named for Bertha King Benkard and displayed furniture she donated to the museum.

Benkard served on the Fine Arts Committee for the Decoration of the White House. She donated many pieces of antique furniture to the Metropolitan Museum of Art and other museums, and she was a close friend of collector Henry Francis du Pont. The Benkard Room at the Met, which displays a collection of her early American furniture, is named for her.

Benkard advised Louise E. du Pont Crowninshield in furnishing Wakefield, a restored mansion in Rhode Island, and traveled with Crowninshield on behalf of the Garden Club of America. She also advised on the furnishing of Kenmore, a historic house in Fredericksburg, Virginia.

Outside of her art collecting interests, Benkard was president general of the Colonial Dames of America, and the first woman elected to be a trustee of the New York Genealogical and Biographical Society (NYG&B). She was a member of the women's board of the Museum of the City of New York. She was president of the North Country Garden Club and vice-president of the Samaritan Home for the Aged.

== Personal life and legacy ==
Bartlett married stockbroker Harry Horton Benkard in 1903. They had two children, Franklin and Bertha. Her husband died in 1928, and she died 1945, probably in her late sixties, at her home in Oyster Bay. Her husband's brother J. Philip Benkard had two notable wives, writer Julia Lynch Olin and singer Ann Swinburne Munroe.
