= Ann Swinburne Munroe =

American singer (1886–1973)

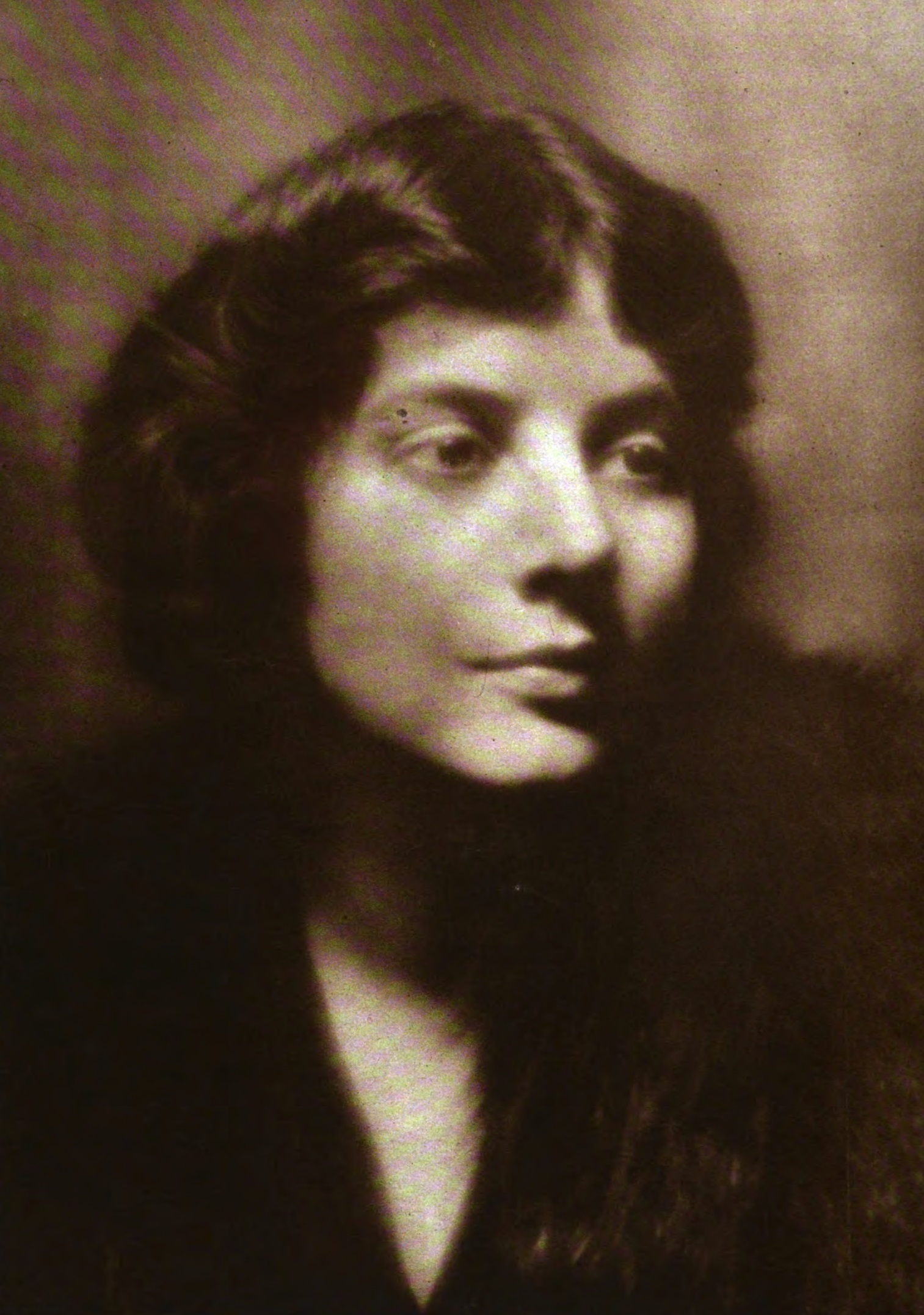
- Ann Swinburne, photographed by Arnold Genthe
- Born: Ann Ditchburn; April 5, 1886; Eugene, Oregon, U.S.
- Died: November 17, 1973 (aged 87); Nassau, Bahamas
- Other names: Ann Schirmer; Ann Benkard
- Occupations: Singer, socialite, and a director of G. Schirmer, Inc.
- Children: 2, including Rudolph Edward Schirmer Jr.
- Relatives: Bertha King Benkard (sister-in-law); Iris Flores (daughter-in-law)

Ann Swinburne Munroe (April 5, 1886 – November 17, 1973), born Ann Ditchburn, was an American singer and socialite. She was also a director of G. Schirmer, Inc., a music publishing company.

== Early life and education ==
Ditchburn was born in Eugene, Oregon, the daughter of John Ditchburn and Ada (Addie) Ray Thatcher Ditchburn. Her father was a lawyer and a judge, and her mother was a dressmaker.

== Career ==
She has stated in an interview in the Sunday Oregonian that her aunt had accompanied her as she had arrived in New York City by ship from Europe and stopped over a for few days with friends hers:

I was asked to sing at a reception given to me, and it happened that there was a man present who knew Joe Weber well. After he heard me sing, he asked to be presented and told me I must meet Mr. Weber and sing for him. He told me about The Climax which had had such a success and about the opportunity in it for a voice like mine...We took it as a joke.

She later sang for Weber was cast in the number two company of the show The Climax.

As Ann Swinburne, she had a brief but successful career in light opera in New York, appearing in:

- The Climax (1910)
- Robin Hood (1912)
- The Count of Luxembourg (1912) with the portrayal of the character Angele Didlier.
- The Madcap Duchess (1913-1914) as Saraphina, with score by Victor Herbert.

She also sang in concert settings, and wore gowns by Lady Duff-Gordon. According to a Count of Luxemberg reviewer:

Ann Swinburne not only looks like Angele, but her voice is of excellent quality, and she uses it with skill and discretion, and in addition acts extremely well.

With her career, she once had explained in an interview about her luck as well as her luck at not being in the musical The Man from Cook's:

Why, I've been lucky all my life. I was even lucky in having typhoid fever. I thought It was most dreadful that I should fall ill and have to give up a leading part... but when a week or two after its New York premiere the piece was sent to the storehouse, I just turned over and thanked my lucky stars that I was saved from all the disappointments that go with such an experience.

She was later a director at G. Schirmer, Inc., a music publishing company, from 1919 to 1964. She was instrumental as a supporter of the early careers of composers Samuel Barber and Gian Carlo Menotti.

== Personal life ==
Ann Ditchburn married three times. Her first husband was Rudolph Edward Schirmer Sr.; they married in 1916 and he died in 1919, leaving her a significant estate. They had a son, Rudolph Edward Schirmer Jr.. Her second husband was stockbroker John Philip Benkard; they married in 1921 and he died in 1929. They had a son, J. Philip Benkard. Her third husband was retired financier Charles Andrews Munroe; they married in 1949 in Monte Carlo, and she moved to the Bahamas with him in 1955. He died there in 1957. She died in 1973, at the age of 87, at a hospital in Nassau.

== Gallery ==
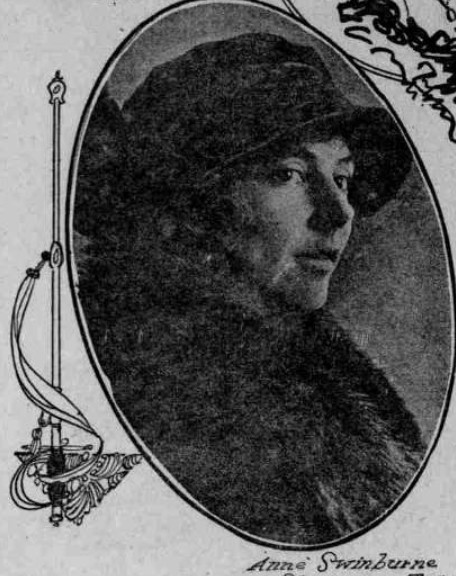
From The Oregonian, as actress/singer Ann Swinburne. 1913

Example of G. Schirmer, Inc. music publication, of which Ann Swinburne served as a director at the corporation. (1919-1964)

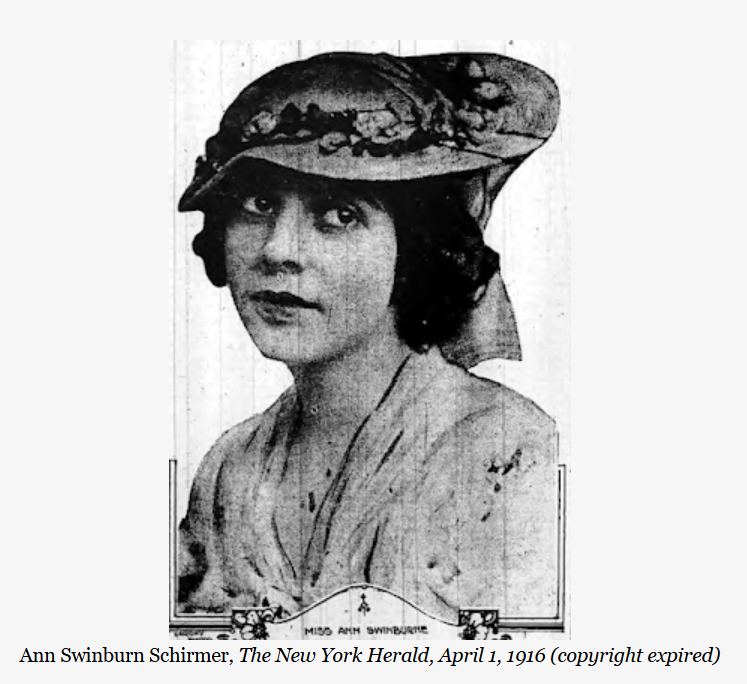
From The New York Herald, as newlywed Ann Swinburne Schirmer. 1916
