= The Arizona Kid (1930 film) =

1930 film

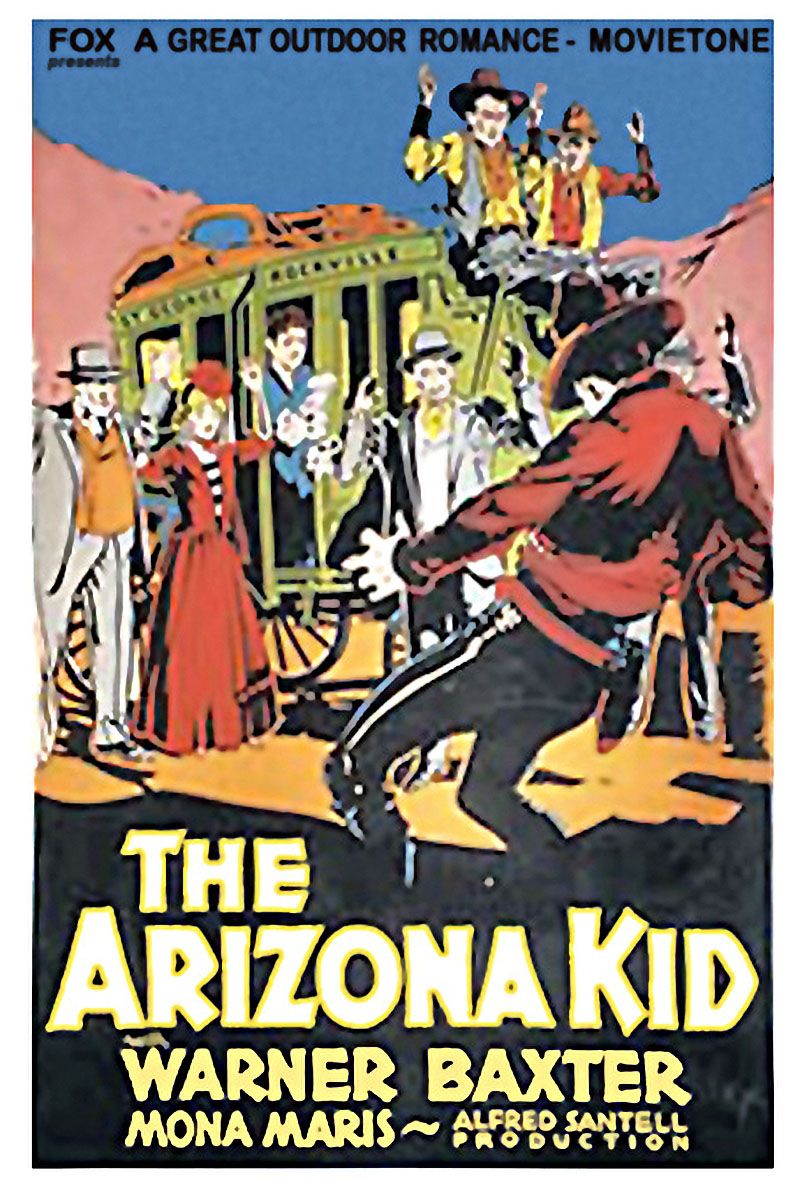
- Theatrical release poster
- Directed by: Alfred Santell
- Written by: Ralph Block; Joseph Wright
- Produced by: Winfield Sheehan
- Starring: Warner Baxter; Mona Maris; Carole Lombard; Theodore von Eltz
- Cinematography: Glen MacWilliams
- Edited by: Paul Weatherwax
- Music by: R.H. Bassett
- Production company: Fox Film Corporation
- Distributed by: Fox Film Corporation
- Release date: April 27, 1930
- Running time: 88 minutes
- Country: United States
- Language: English

The Arizona Kid is a 1930 American pre-Code Western film directed by Alfred Santell. It was produced by Fox Film Corporation.

The original idea was for the film to be a sequel to In Old Arizona (1928), in which Warner Baxter played the Cisco Kid, a character from O. Henry’s 1907 short story The Caballero’s Way. His performance earned him the Academy Award for Best Actor. However, the studio discovered that the rights they had acquired allowed for only a single direct adaptation of the story, which had already been used for the 1928 film. To get around this limitation, Fox released The Arizona Kid, with Baxter playing Chico Cabrillo, a variation of the same archetype, presented as “The Arizona Kid”. The following year, the studio returned to the original character with The Cisco Kid (1931), once again starring Baxter alongside Conchita Montenegro and Edmund Lowe.

The film features Carole Lombard in one of her early roles.

The film was a hit at the box office.

Parts of the film were shot in Grafton, Rockville Road, and Zion National Park in Utah.

== Cast ==
- Warner Baxter as Chico Cabrillo The Arizona Kid
- Carole Lombard as Virginia Hoyt
- Theodore von Eltz as Dick Hoyt
- Hank Mann as Bartender Bill
- Mona Maris as Lorita
- Wilfred Lucas as Manager
- James Gibson as Stage Guard
- Larry McGrath as Homer Snook
- Jack Herrick as The Hoboken Hooker
- Walter P. Lewis as Sheriff Jim Andrews
- Arthur Stone as Snakebite Pete
- De Sacia Mooers as Molly
- Soledad Jiminez as Pulga
- Horace B. Carpenter as Jake Grant
- Art Mix as Mack (uncredited)
- Charles Stevens as Mexican (uncredited)
