= Kurt Leimer =

German musician

Kurt Leimar
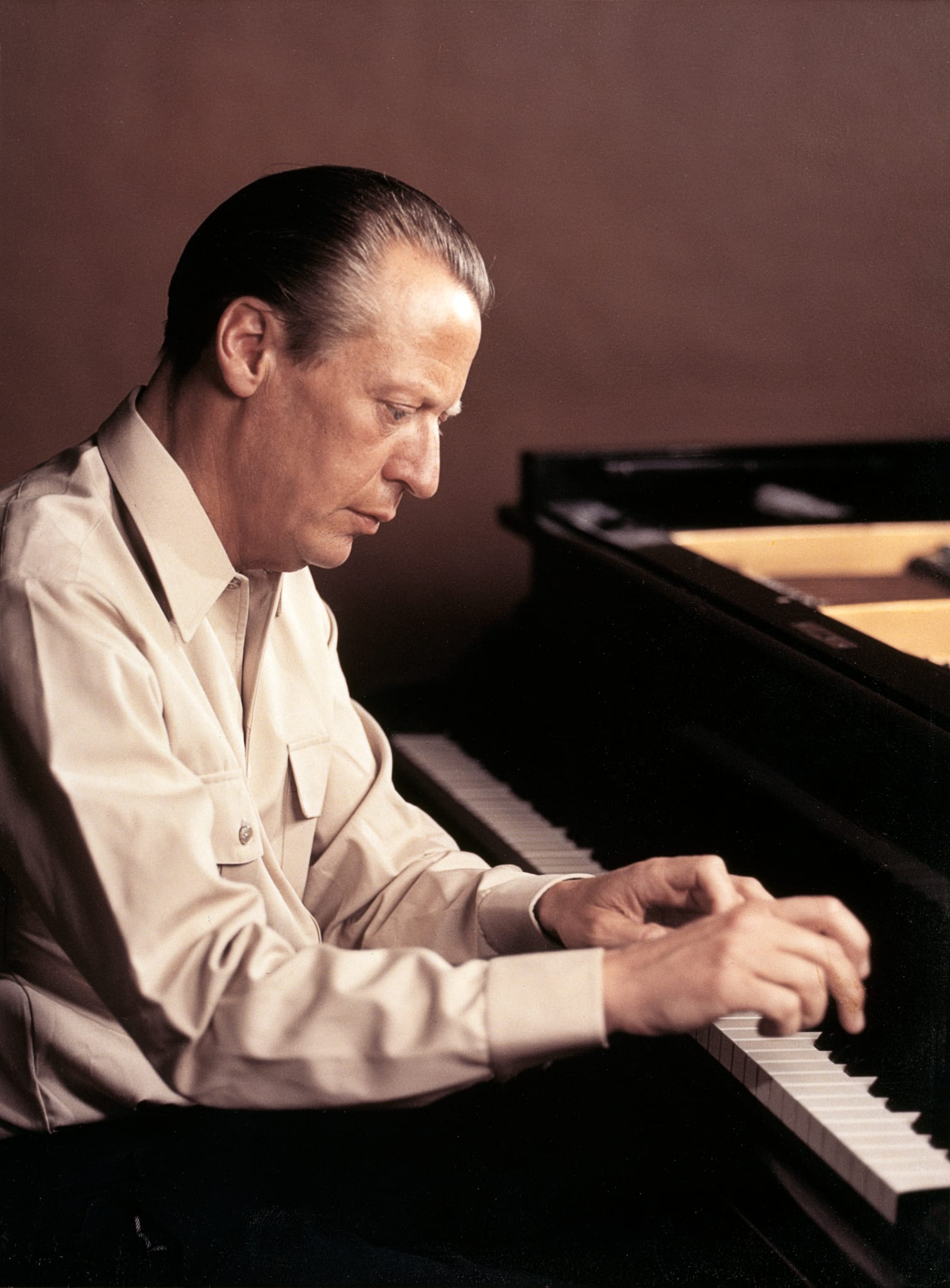

Background information
- Born: September 7, 1920; Wiesbaden
- Died: November 20, 1974 (aged 54) Vaduz
- Occupations: Concert pianist; Composer; Piano instructor

Kurt Leimer (7 September 1920 in Wiesbaden – 20 November 1974 in Vaduz) was a German concert pianist, composer and piano instructor.

== Life ==
Kurt Leimer demonstrated musical talent from a young age. His great-uncle, Karl Leimer, was instructor to pianist Walter Gieseking who together published several piano textbooks. His talent was recognized by Gieseking, Carl Schuricht, and Wilhelm Furtwängler who helped launch his career as a concert pianist. At the age of 18, he received a scholarship to the Berlin Conservatory, where he studied alongside Vladimir Horbowski and Winfried Wolf. The same year, 1938, Leimer made his concert debut in Berlin. In 1939, he continued his studies under Edwin Fischer.

During the latter stages of World War II, Leimer was drafted into the Wehrmacht and was imprisoned in Livorno. The wartime injuries of his peers inspired his most familiar work, the Piano Concerto for Left Hand. The work was inspired by a college friend who lost his right arm to a grenade injury. In 1953, Leimer and the Vienna Philharmonic premiered the work with Herbert von Karajan conducting. In 1955, he premiered his 4th Piano Concerto in C minor with Leopold Stokowski conducting at Carnegie Hall in New York.

Richard Strauss was a particular champion of Leimer's concert career; he dedicated his Panathenäenzug for piano and orchestra to Leimer. Leimer considered performing the premiere of Strauss' work to be a highlight of his career.

In 1953, Leimer was appointed professor at the Academy of Music and Dramatic Arts Mozarteum in Salzburg, a position he held until his death.

Leimer made an early stereo recording of his Piano Concerto No.4 with the Vienna Philharmonic Orchestra conducted by Robert Wagner, on the Decca label, SXL 2100.

== Works ==
- Piano Concerto for the left hand
- Piano Concerto in C minor
- Modern Piano Playing (1931)
- Rhythmics, Dynamics and Other Problems of Piano Playing (1938)
- 3 Briefe an Kurt Leimer (3 Letters to Kurt Leimer) (1949)
  (Co-author of the book with Hans W. Heinsheimer, Gustave Schirmer, and Rudolph Schirmer)<
