= Ignacio Galindo =

Ignacio Galindo may refer to:

- Ignacio Galindo, Spanish colonial governor and municipal president of Monterrey in 1857
- Ignacio Galindo, Spanish football club manager with (as of 2016) Tomelloso CF

== See also ==
- Nacho Galindo (disambiguation)
