= The Gay Cavalier (film) =

1946 film by William Nigh

- Directed by: William Nigh
- Written by: O. Henry; Charles Belden
- Starring: Gilbert Roland; Helen Gerald; Tristram Coffin; Martin Garralaga; Nacho Galindo; Ramsay Ames
- Cinematography: Harry Neumann
- Music by: Edward J. Kay
- Distributed by: Monogram Pictures Corporation
- Release date: March 30, 1946 (U.S.)
- Running time: 65 minutes
- Country: United States
- Language: English

The Gay Cavalier is a 1946 black and white Western adventure starring Gilbert Roland, Helen Gerald and Tristram Coffin. It is based on a story by the author O. Henry.

== Plot ==
Roland plays The Cisco Kid, who sets out on a double mission. He must prevent a girl from marrying a wealthy suitor in order to save her family's hacienda, thus forsaking her true love in doing so; and also apprehend the outlaws who robbed a stagecoach carrying gold to a local mission. He eventually finds that the wealthy suitor is behind the gold robbery, a revelation that makes his task much easier.

== Cast ==
- Gilbert Roland as Cisco Kid
- Martin Garralaga as Don Felipe Geralda
- Nacho Galindo as "Baby"
- Ramsay Ames as Pepita Geralda
- Helen Gerald as Angela Geralda
- Tristram Coffin as Lawton
- Gil Frye as Juan (as Drew Allen)
- Iris Flores as Fisherman's wife
- John Merton as Lewis
- Frank LaRue as Graham
