= South of Monterey =

1946 film by William Nigh

- Theatrical release poster
- Directed by: William Nigh
- Screenplay by: Charles S. Belden
- Based on: The Cisco Kid by O. Henry
- Produced by: Scott R. Dunlap
- Starring: Gilbert Roland; Martin Garralaga; Frank Yaconelli; Marjorie Riordan; Iris Flores; George J. Lewis
- Cinematography: Harry Neumann
- Edited by: Richard Heermance
- Production company: Monogram Pictures
- Distributed by: Monogram Pictures
- Release date: June 15, 1946
- Running time: 63 minutes
- Country: United States
- Language: English

South of Monterey is a 1946 American Western film directed by William Nigh and written by Charles S. Belden. The film stars Gilbert Roland, Martin Garralaga, Frank Yaconelli, Marjorie Riordan, Iris Flores, and George J. Lewis. The film was released on June 15, 1946, by Monogram Pictures.

== Plot ==
The Cisco Kid learns of a land-swindling scheme in a small western town. Although the thievery was actually devised by the Police Commandante Arturo Morales and the tax collector Bennet, Cisco's efforts cause the thieves to fall out. Cisco is able to return the land to the rightful owners.

== Cast ==
- Gilbert Roland as The Cisco Kid
- Martin Garralaga as Auturo Morales
- Frank Yaconelli as Baby
- Marjorie Riordan as Maria Morales
- Iris Flores as Carmelita
- George J. Lewis as Carlos Mandreno
- Harry Woods as Bennet
- Terry Frost as Morgan
- Rosa Turich as Lola

== Soundtrack ==
The following were the composers for the songs in the film:

- Eddie Cherkose
- Gladys Flores
- Edward J. Kay
- Charles Rosoff

The following were the songs in the film:

Songs from South of Monterey (1946)
Title	Lyrics	Music
Tacos del Amor	Gladys Flores	Edward J. Kay
Anoche Hable con la Luna	Gladys Flores	Edward J. Kay
Tu Chulita	Gladys Flores	Edward J. Kay
Ride, Amigos Ride	Edward Cherkose	Charles Rosoff
Cielito Lindo	Quirino Mendoza y Cortés	Quirino Mendoza y Cortés
