= Nacho Galindo (actor) =

Mexican and American film and television actor (1908–1973)

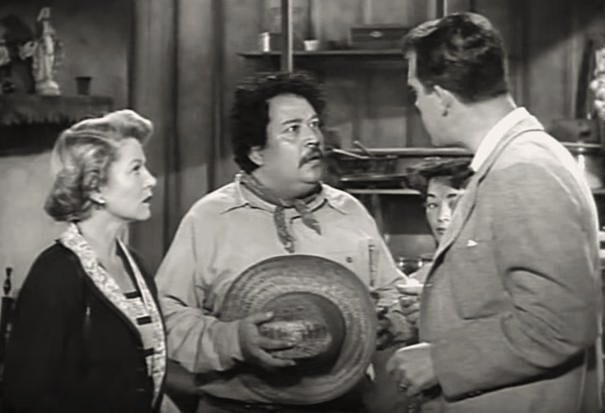
- Nacho Galindo (middle) with Claire Trevor and Fred MacMurray in Borderline (1950)
- Born: Ignacio Galindo Flores; November 7, 1908; Guadalajara, Mexico
- Died: June 22, 1973 (aged 64); Los Angeles, California, U.S.
- Occupations: Film, television actor
- Years active: 1941–1970

Nacho Galindo (November 7, 1908 – June 22, 1973) was a Mexican and American film and television actor who lived and worked in the Los Angeles area for most of his life. Between 1941 and 1970 he had small, often unbilled roles in 71 feature films and at least 60 TV episodes. His most prominent film role was that of the Cisco Kid's third-billed sidekick, "Baby", in 1946's The Gay Cavalier, the first of poverty row studio Monogram's entries in the series, which starred Gilbert Roland as The Cisco Kid.

== Early life ==
"Nacho" was born Ignacio Galindo in Mexico's fourth-largest municipality, Guadalajara. He emigrated to the United States by crossing the footbridge at the border crossing in Laredo, Texas, in 1927.

== Career ==
=== Film career during the 1940s ===
The actor was 32 when he received uncredited bit parts in three 1941 musical comedies, Week-End in Havana (as a singing seller of lollipops), Fiesta and Rio Rita (completed in 1941, released in April 1942), where he was given the opportunity for a solo vocal in "The Ranger's Song". He was also seen in 1941 as a musician in Greta Garbo's final film, Two-Faced Woman.

Whether due to wartime military service or for other reasons, there are no specified acting credits for Galindo between December 1941, as America entered into World War II, and December 1945, which brought his first billed part, a minor role as a character named "Pancho" in the Columbia mystery serial, Who's Guilty? Following another unbilled bit, he played the biggest part of his film career in Monogram's low-budget release The Cisco Kid in The Gay Cavalier. Unlike actors Chris-Pin Martin, Martin Garralaga and Leo Carrillo who played Cisco's comical companion Gordito or Pancho in several films, The Gay Cavalier was Galindo's sole appearance in that characterization, with the sidekick called "Baby" for that single film.

=== Film and television appearances in the 1950s and 60s ===
Following The Gay Cavalier, Galindo returned to playing mostly unbilled bit parts for the remainder of the 1940s, having appeared in 21 features by the end of the decade. His acting assignments multiplied in the 1950s, with roles (almost all unbilled) in 43 features, including such major titles as 1950's Montana and Broken Arrow, 1952's Lone Star, 1953's Tropic Zone and The Hitch-Hiker, 1954's Broken Lance, A Star Is Born and Green Fire, 1955's Hell's Island and The Sea Chase, 1956's The Searchers and 1958's Saddle the Wind. Also, starting with a 1952 episode of the anthology series Rebound, he made 28 television appearances during the decade, with roles in such series as The Life of Riley, Adventures of Superman (both in 1953), My Little Margie and The Lone Ranger (in 1954), The 20th Century Fox Hour (in 1955), Screen Directors Playhouse, Jane Wyman Presents The Fireside Theatre and I Love Lucy [cigar store owner in "The Ricardos Visit Cuba"] (in 1956), Maverick (in 1958) and Zorro in 1959.

Starting with the January 31, 1960, installment of Maverick, Nacho Galindo's acting assignments during the 1960s consisted almost entirely of TV episodes, including Wanted Dead or Alive and Checkmate (in 1960), Mister Ed, Peter Gunn and Perry Mason (in 1961), The Many Loves of Dobie Gillis and 77 Sunset Strip (in 1962), 77 Sunset Strip, Perry Mason and Have Gun – Will Travel (in 1963), Burke's Law (in 1965), The Wild Wild West, Cimarron Strip and The Monkees (in 1967), The Flying Nun, I Spy and Gunsmoke (in 1968), Family Affair and My Three Sons (in 1969). There were 29 such television appearances in addition to 6 theatrical features, including vehicles for Marlon Brando (1961's One-Eyed Jacks), Frank Sinatra, Deborah Kerr and Dean Martin (1965's Marriage on the Rocks) as well as John Wayne and Robert Mitchum (1966's El Dorado). His only work in the 1970s was his last remaining credit, an October 1970 episode of Adam-12.

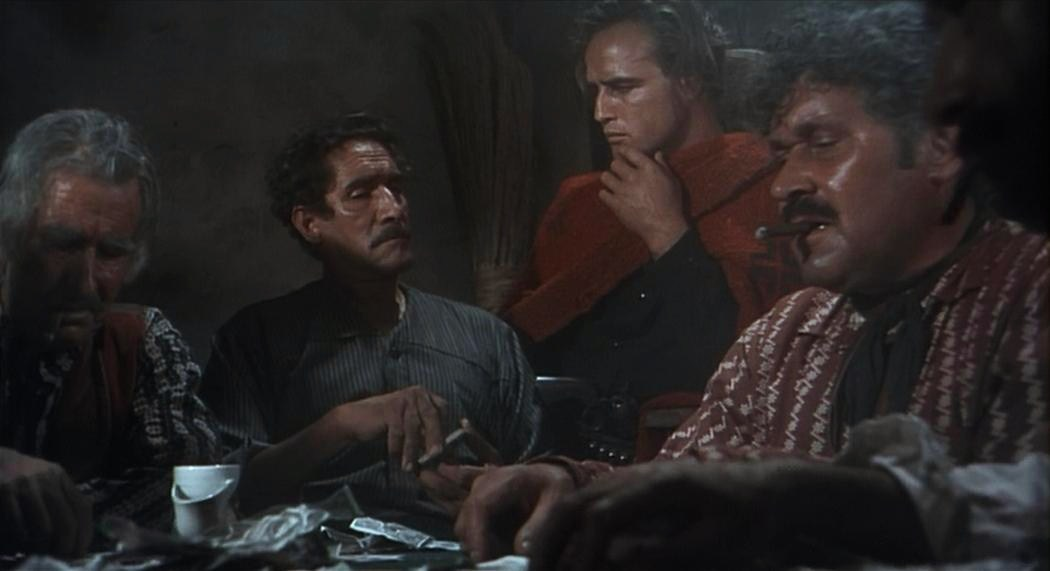
Nacho Galindo (right) with Marlon Brando in One-Eyed Jacks (1961).

Less than three years later, Galindo died in Los Angeles at the age of 64.

== Partial filmography ==
- Week-End in Havana (1941) - Singing Lollipop Vendor (uncredited)
- Fiesta (1941) - Proprietor (uncredited)
- Two-Faced Woman (1941) - Musician (uncredited)
- Rio Rita (1942) - Soloist in "The Ranger's Song" (uncredited)
- Who's Guilty? (1945) - Pancho
- Perilous Holiday (1946) - Proprietor (uncredited)
- The Gay Cavalier (1946) - Baby
- The Lone Wolf in Mexico (1947) - Police Chauffeur (uncredited)
- Twilight on the Rio Grande (1947) - Torres
- Framed (1947) - Crap Shooter (uncredited)
- Rose of Santa Rosa (1947) - Pancho (uncredited)
- Tycoon (1947) - Foreman (uncredited)
- Relentless (1948) - Mexican Peon (uncredited)
- To the Ends of the Earth (1948) - Cab Driver (uncredited)
- Blondie's Reward (1948) - Dickson's Gardener (uncredited)
- The Bribe (1949) - Second Hotel Clerk (uncredited)
- South of St. Louis (1949) - Manuel
- El Paso (1949) - Fernando (uncredited)
- Johnny Stool Pigeon (1949) - Señor Martinez (uncredited)
- The Big Steal (1949) - Pastry Vendor (uncredited)
- Holiday in Havana (1949) - Police Sergeant
- Montana (1950) - Pedro (uncredited)
- The Nevadan (1950) - Mexican Stagecoach Driver (uncredited)
- Dakota Lil (1950) - Chicken Vendor (uncredited)
- Borderline (1950) - Porfirio
- Belle of Old Mexico (1950) - Pico
- Killer Shark (1950) - Maestro - the cook
- One Way Street (1950) - Mexican Villager with Heartburn (uncredited)
- The Reformer and the Redhead (1950) - Mexican-American Speaker (uncredited)
- Broken Arrow (1950) - Barber (uncredited)
- A Lady Without Passport (1950) - Vendor (uncredited)
- The Showdown (1950) - Gonzales
- Surrender (1950) - Gringo
- Cuban Fireball (1951) - Pedro (uncredited)
- Lightning Strikes Twice (1951) - Pedro
- Havana Rose (1951) - Carlo
- Yellow Fin (1951) - Murica
- Lone Star (1952) - Vincente
- Flaming Feather (1952) - Jose (uncredited)
- Macao (1952) - Bus Driver (uncredited)
- Tropic Zone (1953) - Christopher (uncredited)
- The Hitch-Hiker (1953) - Jose Abarrotes - Store Proprietor (uncredited)
- Woman They Almost Lynched (1953) - John Pablo
- Take the High Ground! (1953) - Mexican (uncredited)
- Border River (1954) - Lopez
- Jubilee Trail (1954) - Rico - Bartender (uncredited)
- Gypsy Colt (1954) - Pancho
- Broken Lance (1954) - Francisco the Cook (uncredited)
- The Outcast (1954) - Curly
- A Star Is Born (1954) - José Rodriguez (uncredited)
- Green Fire (1954) - Officer Perez
- Hell's Island (1955) - Carlos Peñasco (uncredited)
- The Sea Chase (1955) - Minor Role (uncredited)
- Headline Hunters (1955) - Ramon - Bartender
- Jaguar (1956) - Garcia Solimos
- Wetbacks (1956) - Alfonso
- The Searchers (1956) - Mexican Bartender (uncredited)
- Santiago (1956) - Bartender (uncredited)
- Thunder Over Arizona (1956) - Pancho Gutierrez
- The Girl Most Likely (1958) - Tijuana Photographer (uncredited)
- Saddle the Wind (1958) - Manuelo (uncredited)
- Buchanan Rides Alone (1958) - Nacho
- Born Reckless (1958) - Papa Gomez
- Cast a Long Shadow (1959) - Hotel Keeper (uncredited)
- One-Eyed Jacks (1961) - Mexican Townsman (uncredited)
- The Runaway (1961) - Max Fernandez - Customs Officer
- Who's Been Sleeping in My Bed? (1963) - Mexican Judge (uncredited)
- Marriage on the Rocks (1965) - Mayor (uncredited)
- El Dorado (1967) - Mexican Saloon Keeper (uncredited)
- The Pink Jungle (1968) - Hotel Proprietor

== Selected Television ==
Year	Title	Role	Notes
1954	The Lone Ranger	Pancho	Episode, "Dan Reid's Fight for Life"
1963	Have Gun - Will Travel	Soledado	Episode "The Black Bull"
1960	Wanted Dead or Alive	Howard Wiley	Season 3, Episode 8 "To the Victor"
1967	The Monkees	Pedro	S2:E1, "A Nice Place to Visit"
