= G. Schirmer, Inc. =

American classical music publishing company

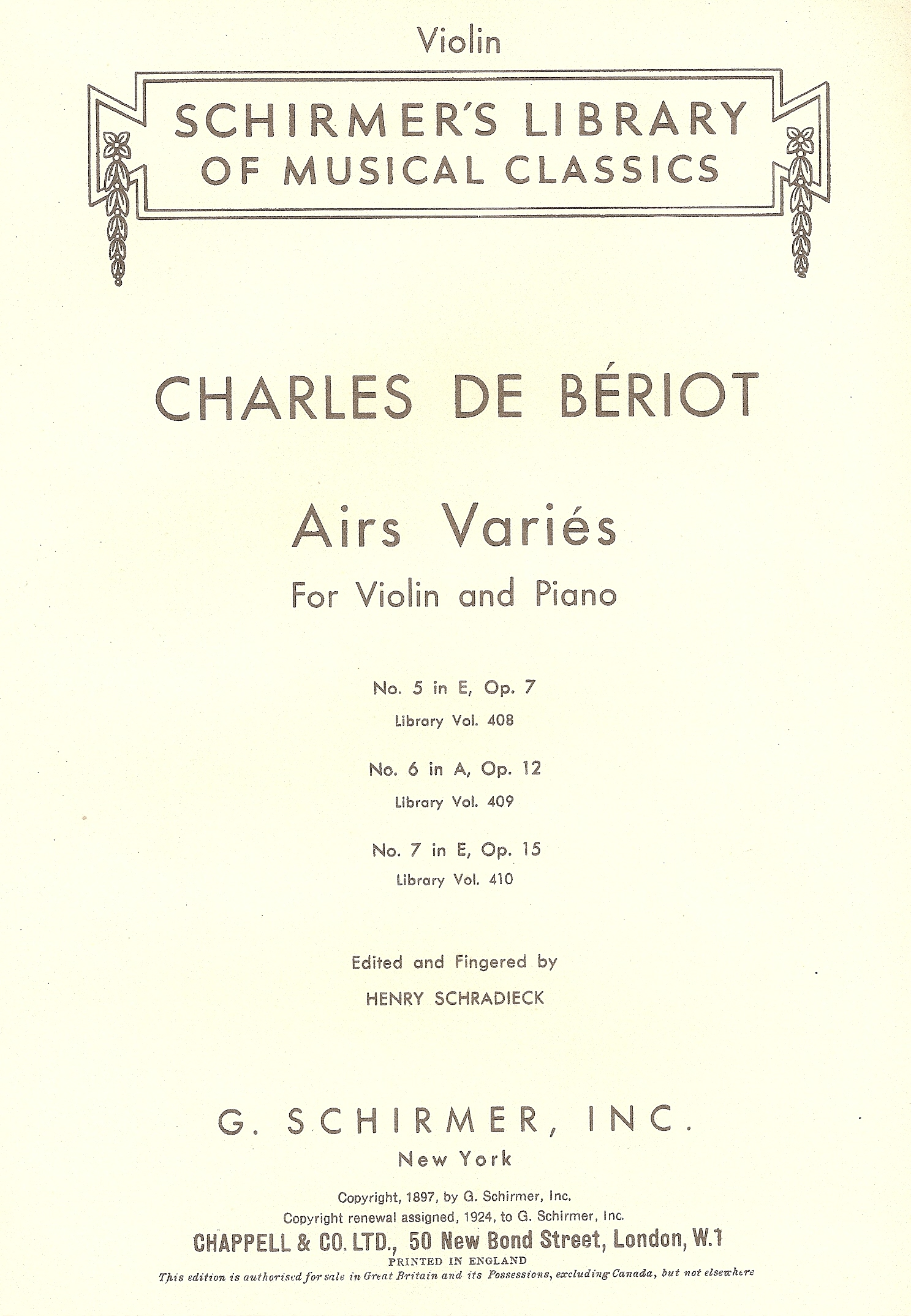
- A Schirmer cover page of several of Bériot's works
- Parent company: Wise Music Group
- Founded: 1861; 165 years ago
- Founder: Gustav Schirmer
- Country of origin: United States
- Headquarters location: New York City
- Publication types: Sheet music, books
- Fiction genres: Music
- Official website: www.schirmer.com

G. Schirmer, Inc. is an American classical music publishing company based in New York City, founded in 1861. The oldest active music publisher in the United States, Schirmer publishes sheet music for sale and rental, and represents some well-known European music publishers in North America, such as the Music Sales Affiliates ChesterNovello, Breitkopf & Härtel, Sikorski and many Russian and former Soviet composers' catalogs.

== History ==
In 1861, the G. Schirmer company was founded in the United States by German-born Gustav Schirmer Sr. (1829–1893), the son of a German immigrant. In 1854, Gustav Schirmer became a manager of the New York publisher Kerksieg & Breusing. (Note: Kersieg & Breusing had been in business for six years at this point, with the business having been founded in 1848.) Seven years later, in 1861, he and his colleague Bernard Beer operated the company, and the company became Beer and Schirmer. In 1866, Beer sold his interest in the company to Schirmer, and the company became G. Schirmer. In that same year, Gustave Schirmer's son Rudolph Schirmer, became president of the corporation. In 1891, the company established its own engraving and printing plant, which allowed for the facilitation of a rapid growth in the music catalogues. The next year, in 1892, it inaugurated the Schirmer's Library of Musical Classics. The yellow bound books, focusing on American music, began under the editorial direction of Hermann Grafton.

In 1915, Rudolph Schirmer, together with musicologist Oscar Sonneck, founded The Musical Quarterly, the oldest academic journal on music in the U.S. Sonneck would edit the journal until his death in 1928. (Note: The 1919 edition of The Music Quarterly described Schirmer as the founder. However, the 1929 edition of the same journal described Sonneck as the founder.)

After Schirmer's death in 1919, his widow, Ann Swinburne Munroe, became a director of the company until 1968. From 1949 to 1965, Rudolph Schirmer Jr., the son of Rudolph Schirmer and grandson of Gustav Schirmer, Sr., served as vice-president of the company.

In 1964, Schirmer acquired Associated Music Publishers (AMP), which had built up an important catalog of composers, including Elliott Carter, Henry Cowell, Roy Harris, Charles Ives, Walter Piston, and William Schuman, adding to a Schirmer's ASCAP roster that had already included Samuel Barber, Leonard Bernstein, Morton Gould, Gian Carlo Menotti, and Virgil Thomson, as well as composers from the earlier part of the century such as Charles Tomlinson Griffes, Charles Martin Loeffler, Mary Plumstead, Marie Pooler, Frances Marion Ralston, Geni Sadero, John Alden Carpenter, and Percy Grainger.

From 1965 to 1979, Rudolph Schirmer moved up from vice-president to serve as chairman of the board.

In 1968, major book publisher Macmillan purchased the company, which had been owned by the Schirmer family for over 100 years.

In 1986, Macmillan sold G. Schirmer (except for its reference division, now part of Cengage Learning) to its current owner, Robert Wise, the owner of a popular music publisher, known then as "The Music Sales Group". According to a spokesman, the purchase price was around US$7 million (equivalent to $21 million in 2025). In February 2020, 14 years later, The Music Sales Group would change its name to "Wise Music Group". In 1986, Wise Music Group Schirmer placed G. Schirmer and its 1964 acquisition of AMP under the Hal Leonard Corporation, a print distributor of jazz and popular music, for the sole distribution of Schirmer's and AMP's printed music.

In 1989, the previously uncertain future of The Musical Quarterly journal, which had not been included in the original sale of Schirmer, was finally resolved with its transition to publisher Oxford University Press.

In 1992, at the age of 72, Gus Schirmer IV died. A theatrical director, producer, and agent, he was the last member of the family named for the founder.

== Modern composers published by the company ==
The Schirmer/AMP catalog includes composers such as Billy Joel, John Corigliano, Richard Danielpour, Gabriela Lena Frank, John Harbison, Aaron Jay Kernis, Leon Kirchner, Dee Libbey, Peter Lieberson, André Previn, Gladys Rich, Bright Sheng, Tan Dun, Du Yun, Robert Xavier Rodriguez, and Joan Tower.

The company also publishes The G. Schirmer Manual of Style and Usage. G. Schirmer is a member of the Music Sales Group of Companies, the Music Publishers Association, the National Music Publishers Association, and the Church Music Publishers Association.
