= Rudolph Edward Schirmer Jr. =

American composer and music publisher

- Born: June 18, 1919
- Died: November 19, 2000
- Education: Princeton University; Curtis Institute of Music
- Occupations: Composer; poet; lyricist; chairman of the board (G. Schirmer, Inc.)
- Years active: 1948-1998
- Spouses: Countess Ena Wenkheim (m. 1949; div. 1953) Iris Flores (m. 1958; div. 1970)
- Children: Liane Schirmer
- Parents: Rudolph E. Schirmer Sr. (father); Ann Swinburne Munroe (mother)
- Relatives: Gustav Schirmer (grandfather)

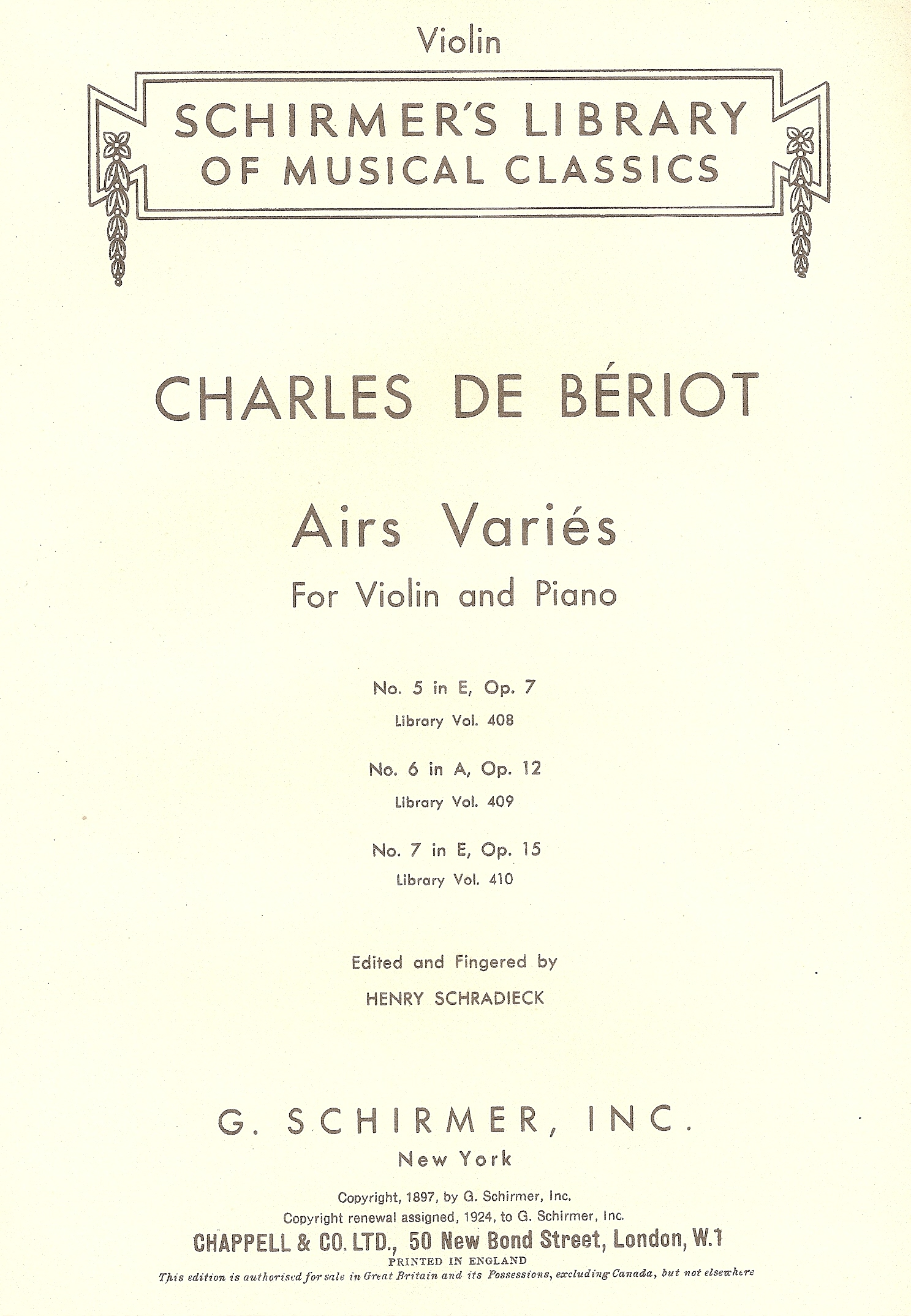
G. Schirmer, Inc. cover page of Bériot's Airs Variés. Schirmer was the former chairman of the Board of the music publishing corporation.

Rudolph Edward Schirmer Jr. (June 18, 1919 – Nov 19, 2000) was a composer, lyricist, poet, and the former chairman of the Board of G. Schirmer Music Inc., an American classical music publishing company. In World War II, he worked in the U.S. Military Intelligence Service during the war in a unit called the Ritchie Boys, which was a unit that consisted of German-speaking personnel for roles in counterintelligence in Europe, translating key information from German prisoners of war (POW), and related services.

Starting in 1949, Schirmer was a prolific songwriter for over 20 years. He occasionally used poetry by notable poets or books by notable authors as the lyrics for songs.

In 1968, he wrote Hymn to the Americas (Himno a las Americas in Spanish) which was performed by the Washington National Symphony at the Fourth Inter-American Music Festival in 1968.

== Early life ==
Rudolph Schirmer was the son of singer Ann Swinburne Munroe and Rudolph Edward Schirmer Sr., the previous publisher and president of G. Schirmer. His grandfather was Gustav Schirmer the founder of the G. Schirmer corporation.

Rudolph E. Schirmer Jr. originally attended Princeton University. He later left Princeton during his sophomore year to attend the Curtis Institute of Music in Philadelphia, where he studied composition under Rosario Scalero. Although he left Princeton to transfer to another school, he is considered a 1941 alumnus by the university.

== Music and writing career ==
Schirmer's works in music and literature span close to 50 years:

=== 1949 ===
In 1949, he was one of the co-writers for the German book 3 Briefe an Kurt Leimer (3 Letters to Kurt Leimer). Kurt Leimer was a German pianist, composer, and piano teacher who had been drafted in World War II into the Wehrmacht (collective of armed forces of Nazi Germany) and became a POW in Livorno, Italy in 1944, as the war was coming to a close. (Note: Schirmer worked in the Ritchie Boys unit in WW II, which consisted of German-speaking interrogators for interviewing German POWs. However, it is unclear if Schirmer and Leimer had met during the war.)

In terms of musical works, Schirmer had copyrighted the song he had written "Remember thee!" for voice and piano, with words by the English Romantic poet Lord Byron (1788- 1824). The same year, he also wrote the song "Love's Secret" with words by English poet and artist William Blake (1757- 1827) as well as "So we''ll go no more a-roving" with words also by Lord Byron.

=== 1955 ===
In 1955, he did the music arrangement of "A Child's Prayer", which was a song for three-part chorus of women's voices accompanied by piano. The lyrics were from the 1944 book Prayer for a Child by American novelist, poet, and children's fiction writer Rachel Field (1894–1942), which was a classic bedtime prayer.

=== 1960s ===
In 1960, Schirmer copyrighted his musical compositions for the musical Forty Ways to Sunday. Some of the compositions below can be seen in the section named Music for musical 40 ways to Sunday.

Between 1961 and 1963, he wrote the music and lyrics for the following songs:

- "Bluebird"
- "Seven Songs"
- "Don't Mention Love Again"
- "The Gift of Christmas"
- "Nobody Wants My Heart"
- "You"

In 1964, he wrote the collection of poems titled A Friend in Fantasy: Poems.

In 1968, he wrote Hymn to the Americas (Himno a las Americas in Spanish), which was for a four-part chorus of mixed voices with a soprano solo and piano accompaniment. The Spanish text was written by Fernando Flores. (Note: Fernando Flores was the former consul general to the Government of Costa Rica) It was performed by the Washington National Symphony at the Fourth Inter-American Music Festival in 1968.

=== 1998 ===
In 1998, he was reader/performer for the published audiobook The Doors of Perception, which is reading of the 1954 book of English philosopher and writer Aldous Huxley. The work ties into the earlier works of Schirmer based, in that as the song "Love's Secret" (1949) incorporates the words from the poem of the same name by William Blake, so is the title of "The Door of Perception" from Blake's 1793 book The Marriage of Heaven and Hell:

If the doors of perception were cleansed every thing would appear to man as it is, Infinite. For man has closed himself up, till he sees all things thro' narrow chinks of his cavern.

== Discography (recorded media) ==
Title	Date	Words	Music	Arrangement	Performer
Remember thee! Remember thee!	1949	Romantic poet Lord Byron (1788- 1824)	Rudolph Schirmer		
Love's Secret	1949	English poet and artist William Blake (1757- 1827)	Rudolph Schirmer		
So we''ll go no more a-roving	1949	George Gordan Byron (Lord Byron)	Rudolph Schirmer		
A Child's Prayer: for three-part chorus of women's voices with piano accompaniment.	1955	American novelist, poet, and children's fiction writer Rachel Field	Gustav Klemm	Rudolph Schirmer	
Yvonne	1957	Rudolph Schirmer	Abbey McVay	Rudolph Schirmer	
United States Victory March	1961		Rudolph Schirmer	Gene von Hallberg	
Bluebird	1961	Rudolph Schirmer	Rudolph Schirmer		
Seven Songs: Form of Wooing.; Sound of Laughter.; Honey Shun.; Wanderlust.; Lullaby.; Ianthe.; My Heart is a River	1962	Rudolph Schirmer	Rudolph Schirmer		
Don't Mention Love Again	1963	Rudolph Schirmer	Rudolph Schirmer		
The Gift of Christmas	1963	Rudolph Schirmer	Rudolph Schirmer		
Nobody Wants My Heart	1963	Rudolph Schirmer	Rudolph Schirmer		
You	1963	Rudolph Schirmer	Rudolph Schirmer		
Hymn to the Americas	1968	Rudolph Schirmer	Rudolph Schirmer		
The Doors of Perception(Audiobook)	1998	English writer and philosopher Aldous Huxley			Rudolph Schirmer

== Books and poetry (printed media) ==
Title		Author
3 Briefe an Kurt Leimer	1949	Hans W. Heinsheimer, Kurt Leimer, Gustave Schirmer, Rudolph Schirmer
A Poem for Spain: Santa Cruz del Valle de Los Caidos		Rudolph Schirmer
A Friend in Fantasy; Poems	1964	Rudolph Schirmer
Introduction to Art Song. Mezzo-soprano/alto : Songs in English for Classical Voice Students.	2016	Joan Frey Boytim (Compiler), Laura Ward (Instrumentalist), Brendan Fox (Instrumentalist), Richard Hageman, C. Alison-Crompton, Rudolph Schirmer, Easthope Martin, Carl Hahn, Herbert Kingsley, Eric H. Thiman, Clara Edwards, Franco Leoni, Samuel Barber, Thomas Linley, William Schuman, Thomas Vincent Cator, John Jacob Niles, Roger Quilter, Thomas Augustine Arne

== Personal life ==
Schirmer's first marriage was in 1949 to Countess Marnegu Eugenia Wenckheim (Countess Ena Wenkheim), a descendant of the leadership of the Austria-Hungarian Empire. The wedding was at St. Peter's Basilica in Rome. In the same year of Shirmer's first marriage to Countess Ena Wenkheim, he was one of the co-writers for the German book 3 Briefe an Kurt Leimer (3 Letters to Kurt Leimer). However, they were divorced in 1953.

On February 8, 1958, Schirmer married film actress Iris Flores in New York City. Flores was a former film actress as well as an inventor and the granddaughter of the former president of Costa Rica, the late Rafael Yglesias Castro. While they were married, Schirmer wrote Hymn to the Americas (Himno a las Americas in Spanish), which was for a four-part chorus of mixed voices with a soprano solo and piano accompaniment. The Spanish text was written by his brother-in-law and the former Vice Consul to the Government of Costa Rica, Fernando Flores. It was performed by the Washington National Symphony at the Fourth Inter-American Music Festival in 1968. After 12 years of marriage, they were divorced in November 1970.

On January 9, 1972, Schirmer married Maria Raffaela Mormino. They were married until Schirmer died in 2000.

== Lyrics for Love's Secret ==
The William Blake poem Love's Secret were the lyrics for the Schirmer song of the same name. The poem is presently in the public domain:

Never seek to tell thy love,

Love that never told can be;

For the gentle wind doth move

Silently, invisibly.

I told my love, I told my love,

I told her all my heart,

Trembling, cold, in ghastly fears.

Ah! she did depart!

Soon after she was gone from me,

A traveller came by,

Silently, invisibly:

He took her with a sigh.

== Music for musical Forty Ways to Sunday ==
In 1960, Schirmer copyrighted his musical compositions for the musical Forty Ways to Sunday. The following are the majority of the songs:

Forty Ways to Sunday
Title	Words and music
Forty Ways to Sunday	Rudolph Schirmer
Biggest Little City	Rudolph Schirmer
Divorcing Quietly	Rudolph Schirmer
Don't Be a Martyr	Rudolph Schirmer
Evening Star	Rudolph Schirmer
Gosh, Darn, Dern It	Rudolph Schirmer
Him Again	Rudolph Schirmer
I Get a Yen	Rudolph Schirmer
I Wonder if I'll Ever Fall in Love?	Rudolph Schirmer
It's a Glowing	Rudolph Schirmer
Just Do It	Rudolph Schirmer
Little Old We	Rudolph Schirmer
Lullaby	Rudolph Schirmer
A Man Has to Get Away	Rudolph Schirmer
My Man O' War	Rudolph Schirmer
Wandering Man	Rudolph Schirmer
Pullin' Up Stakes	Rudolph Schirmer
See You Later	Rudolph Schirmer
Slot Machine	Rudolph Schirmer

== Gallery ==
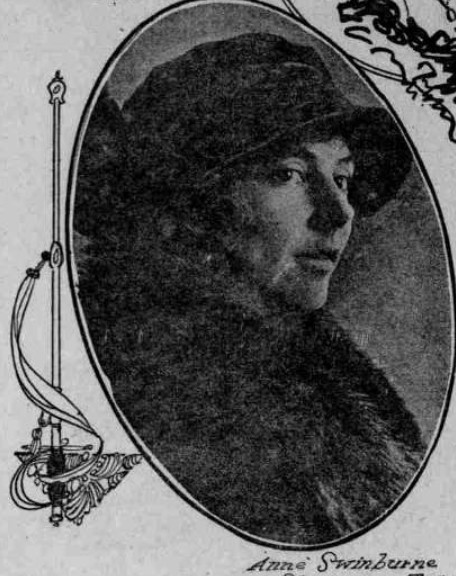
Schirmer's mother, Ann Swinburne Munroe (1913),

An example of a G. Schirmer, Inc. publication. Schirmer was the former chairman of the board of the music publishing company G. Schirmer.

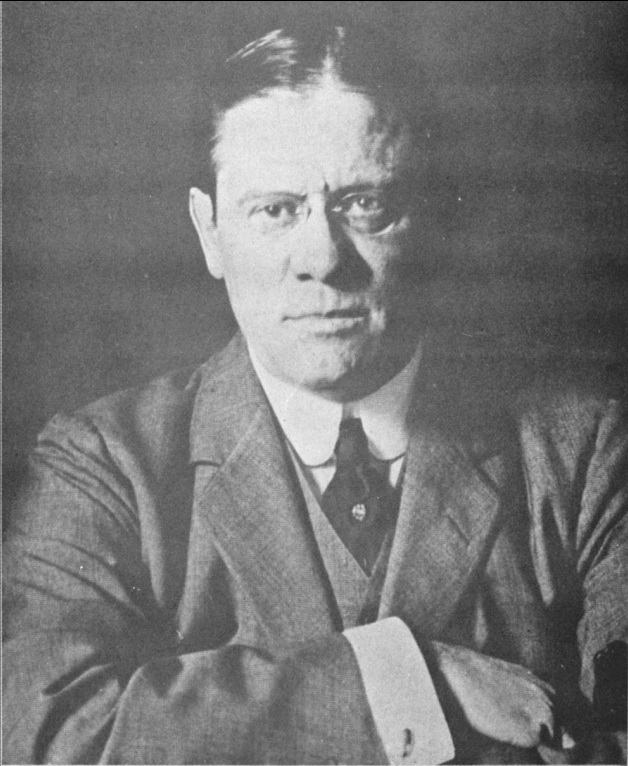
Rudolph Schirmer Jr's father, Rudolph Schirmer (1919), who was the earlier president of G. Schirmer.
