= The Musical Quarterly =

Oldest academic journal on music in America

- Discipline: Music
- Language: English
- Edited by: Leon Botstein

Publication details
- History: Since 1915
- Publisher: Oxford University Press (United States)
- Frequency: Quarterly

Standard abbreviations
- ISO 4: Music. Q.

Indexing
- ISSN: 0027-4631
- LCCN: 2004-235646
- JSTOR: 00274631
- OCLC no.: 53165498

Links
- Journal homepage

The Musical Quarterly is the oldest academic journal on music in America. The journal was originally conceived and established in 1915 by Rudolph E. Schirmer Sr. in collaboration with Oscar Sonneck. The journal was edited by Sonneck until his death in 1928. Sonneck was succeeded by a number of editors, including Carl Engel (1930–1944), Gustave Reese (1944–45), Paul Henry Lang (1945–1973), Joan Peyser (1977–1984), and Eric Salzman (1984–1991).

Since 1993, The Musical Quarterly has been edited by Leon Botstein, president of Bard College and principal conductor of the American Symphony Orchestra. Originally published by G. Schirmer, Inc., it is now published by Oxford University Press.

The journal published articles on a variety music topics. For example, in the publication's first volume, in 1915, the journal published the article The Study of Indian Music by American anthropologist Frances Densmore. In that time, Indian music for Americans was the term for Native American music. Other examples of early articles are the theoretical perspectives of the 1922 articles Poetry and the Composer by Australian composer Ernest Henry Clark Oliphant and Music versus Materialism by American author and composer Elise Fellows White.
