= The Cisco Kid (1994 film) =

1994 TV film

- Warner Archive Collection DVD cover
- Based on: The Cisco Kid by O. Henry
- Written by: Michael Kane; Luis Valdez
- Directed by: Luis Valdez
- Starring: Jimmy Smits; Cheech Marin
- Music by: Joseph Julián González
- Country of origin: United States
- Original language: English

Production
- Executive producer: Moctesuma Esparza
- Producers: Gary M. Goodman; Robert A. Katz; Barry Rosen
- Production locations: Sinaloa, Mexico; Sombrerete, Zacatecas; Zacatecas, Zacatecas; Guadalupe, Zacatecas; Pachuca, Hidalgo; San Pedro Tlochataco, Hidalgo; Santa Maria Regla, Hidalgo; Sierra de Organos, Sombrerete, Zacatecas
- Cinematography: Guillermo Navarro
- Editor: Zach Staenberg
- Running time: 91 minutes
- Production company: Turner Pictures

Original release
- Network: TNT
- Release: February 6, 1994

The Cisco Kid is a 1994 American Western comedy TV movie, based on the character of the same name created by O. Henry. The property had previously been adapted as the successful 1950s comedy Western television series, and several movies and serials from the 1930s to the 1950s.

The film was written by Michael Kane and directed by Luis Valdez. Jimmy Smits played the Cisco Kid, the role previously played by Duncan Renaldo, Gilbert Roland, and Cesar Romero. Cheech Marin played his sidekick Pancho. Bruce Payne and Ron Perlman played French villains. The film aired on the TNT Network.

== Plot ==
The Cisco Kid and Pancho are about to be executed by the French, who have taken over part of Mexico, when an attack on the prison by rebels allows them both to escape. Still chained together, they steal a burro and ride to a nearby village where they come upon a tax collector and several soldiers in the process of taking money from the villagers. The pair manage to overcome the soldiers, and using their guns, free themselves from the chains and rob the tax collector.

Pancho takes Cisco back to his village, where the pair inspire Mexican peasants to oust settlers from the Second French Empire. The action continues with gun battles, kidnapping, swordplay, humor and suspense.

== Cast ==
- Jimmy Smits as Cisco Kid
- Cheech Marin as Pancho
- Sadie Frost as Dominique
- Bruce Payne as General Martin Dupre
- Ron Perlman as Lt. Col. Delacroix
- Tony Amendola as Washam
- Tim Thomerson as Lundquist
- Pedro Armendariz as General Montano
- Phil Esparza as Kessler
- Clayton Landey as Van Boose
- Charles McCaughan as Haynie
- Tony Pandolfo as Alain Vitton
- Roger Cudney as Alcott
- Alberto Tamayo as Indian

== Production ==
The film was directed by Luis Valdez. Filming took place in Sierra de Órganos National Park in the town of Sombrerete, Mexico.

== Reception ==
Just before its initial airing, Todd Everett of Variety praised the casting of Jimmy Smits in the role of The Cisco Kid as "ideal", and wrote that Cheech Marin as Pancho had "never been more appealing". He predicted that the film would have broad appeal. Kim Newman of Empire stated that the film was 'a likeable cable revival for the old 1950s series Western character' and noted that it depicted Mexicans in a less stereotypical fashion than the original television series. Nonetheless, Newman stated that it 'continues to depict the French (Bruce Payne, Ron Perlman) as effete sadists and the gringos (Tim Thomerson) as grungy swine'.

Mick Martin and Marsha Porter of Video Movie Guide 1995 stated that it was an 'enjoyable, lighthearted Western...spiced with humor and enthusiastic performances by Jimmy Smits and Richard 'Cheech' Marin'. Similarly, Ray Loynd of the Los Angeles Times stated that Smits played the Cisco Kid with an 'easy swagger and light romantic panache'.

Terry Rowan described the film as a 'tongue-in-cheek comedy western filled with fast gunplay, narrow escapes, wild rides, battling armies and yes, some romance'. Michael Pitts stated that a highlight of the film was the 'use of authentic locations depicting the rural Mexico of 1867'.
