= The Cisco Kid (1931 film) =

1931 film

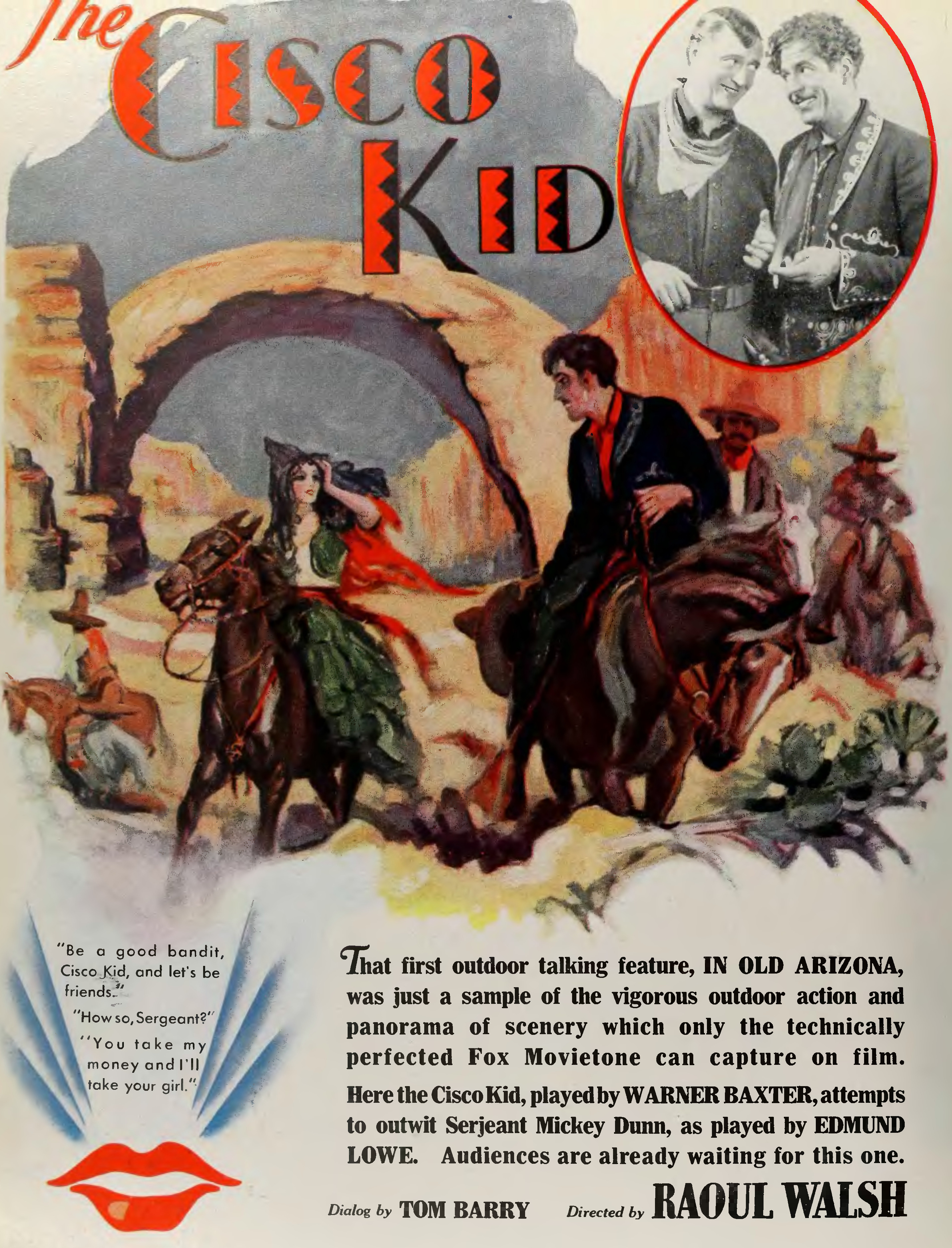
- Newspaper advertisement
- Directed by: Irving Cummings
- Written by: Al Cohn
- Based on: character by O. Henry
- Produced by: Fox Film Corporation
- Starring: Warner Baxter
- Cinematography: Barney McGill; Jack Marta; William Whitley; J. P. Van Wormer
- Edited by: Alex Troffey
- Music by: George Lipschultz
- Production company: Fox Film Corporation
- Distributed by: Fox Film Corporation
- Release date: November 1, 1931
- Running time: 61 minutes
- Country: United States
- Language: English

The Cisco Kid is a 1931 American pre-Code Western film directed by Irving Cummings and starring Warner Baxter. It was produced and distributed by Fox Film Corporation and is a follow-up to Fox's hugely successful 1928 In Old Arizona and 1930's The Arizona Kid, both of which had starred Baxter as the same character The Cisco Kid. A copy is preserved at the Library of Congress.

== Plot ==
The Cisco Kid saves a widow's ranch by robbing a bank. He risks being captured when he erroneously thinks that one of her children has been injured. The local sergeant is so impressed by that concern that he "accidentally" lets Cisco escape.

== Cast ==
- Warner Baxter as The Cisco Kid
- Edmund Lowe as Sergeant Michael Patrick "Mickey" Dunn
- Conchita Montenegro as Carmencita
- Nora Lane as Sally Benton
- Frederick Burt as Sheriff Tex Ransom
- Willard Robertson as Enos Hankins
- James Bradbury Jr. as Dixon, U.S.A.
- John Webb Dillon as Bouse, U.S.A.
- Charles Stevens as Lopez
- Douglas Haig as Billy
- Marilyn Knowlden as Annie Benton
- George Irving as Officer (uncredited)
