= Gus Schirmer Jr. =

American actor

Gustave Schirmer IV (1918–1992), better known as Gus Schirmer Jr., was a director, producer, and talent agent in film and theatre. Schirmer directed and produced plays that ran On Broadway and Off Broadway. He also helped launch the careers of several actors.

== Early life and education ==
Schirmer was born in New York City on October 18, 1918. He attended the Morristown School in Morristown, New Jersey and served as assistant manager of the ice hockey team. Schirmer went on the team's tour of Europe that included games against Germany, France, and Switzerland; president Franklin Roosevelt wished the team luck before they set sail in a telegram.

At age fifteen, Schirmer starred in the first New Faces, a series of musicals. Acting alongside Henry Fonda and Imogene Coca, Schirmer sang torch songs (sentimental love songs) and tap danced at the Fulton Theatre on Broadway. New Faces introduced promising new actors like Schirmer to theatre.

== Career as an agent ==
While working as an agent, Schirmer helped establish the careers of Hollywood stars. He served as an agent for Lee Remick, Shirley Jones, and Sandy Duncan after discovering their talents. Schirmer also managed the careers of Carol Channing, Ethel Merman, Patricia Wilson, Peggy Cass, and Rosemary Kuhlmann.

In Wilson's autobiography, she describes Schirmer as:

Without question, one of the most unique people in my lifetime of meeting unique people: blunt, sentimental, irascible, tasteful, generous to a fault, and masculine, but candidly gay in a time when "politically correct" was forty years in the future. He had a built-in radar for talent, and one of the biggest hearts I've encountered in show business.

When Actress Jet Macdonald recommended Schirmer to Wilson in 1954, she stated, "Gus Junior is one of New York's top talent agents. He knows everyone in theatre, from Ethal Merman to Rodgers and Hammerstein. And he's not intimidated by anyone!"

== Theatre career ==
In 1954, Schirmer directed the Broadway play Dear Charles, which starred Tallulah Bankhead; he later staged her nightclub act in Las Vegas. Schirmer also directed Broadway revivals, including the 1965 revival of Guys and Dolls and the 1970 revival of The Boyfriend, a musical starring Sandy Duncan. He produced shows Off Broadway that included A Party with Comden and Green at the Cherry Lane Theatre and Gay Divorce starring Beatrice Arthur.

Schirmer directed musicals at New York City Center, including Wonderful Town starring Elaine Stritch, Guys and Dolls with Sheila MacRae, and Pal Joey with Bob Fosse. He also directed A Tree Grows in Brooklyn and Desk Set with Shirley Booth at the Westport Country Playhouse in Westport, Connecticut.

== Film and TV career ==
In 1972, Schirmer moved to Los Angeles, California to begin his career in Hollywood as a booking and casting director and consultant. He served as the casting director for The Muppet Movie, which theaters showed in 1979. Schirmer also served as the casting director for The Hills Have Eyes, a 1977 Wes Craven horror movie, and as a casting executive with The Muppets Take Manhattan.

Schirmer also served as a casting director, talent executive, and consultant for TV movies and specials. He served as a casting director for TV specials from Disney, Circus of the Stars on CBS-TV, and Musical Comedy Tonight on PBS. In 1985 and 1986, Schirmer served as a talent executive for broadcasts of the second and third inductions of the Television Academy Hall of Fame on NBC-TV. He also served as a casting consultant for The Love Boat TV movie, which aired in 1976, and Musical Comedy Tonight III in 1985.
