= Gustav Schirmer =

German-American music publisher

Gustav Schirmer (September 19, 1829 - August 6, 1893) was a German-American music publisher.

== Life and work ==
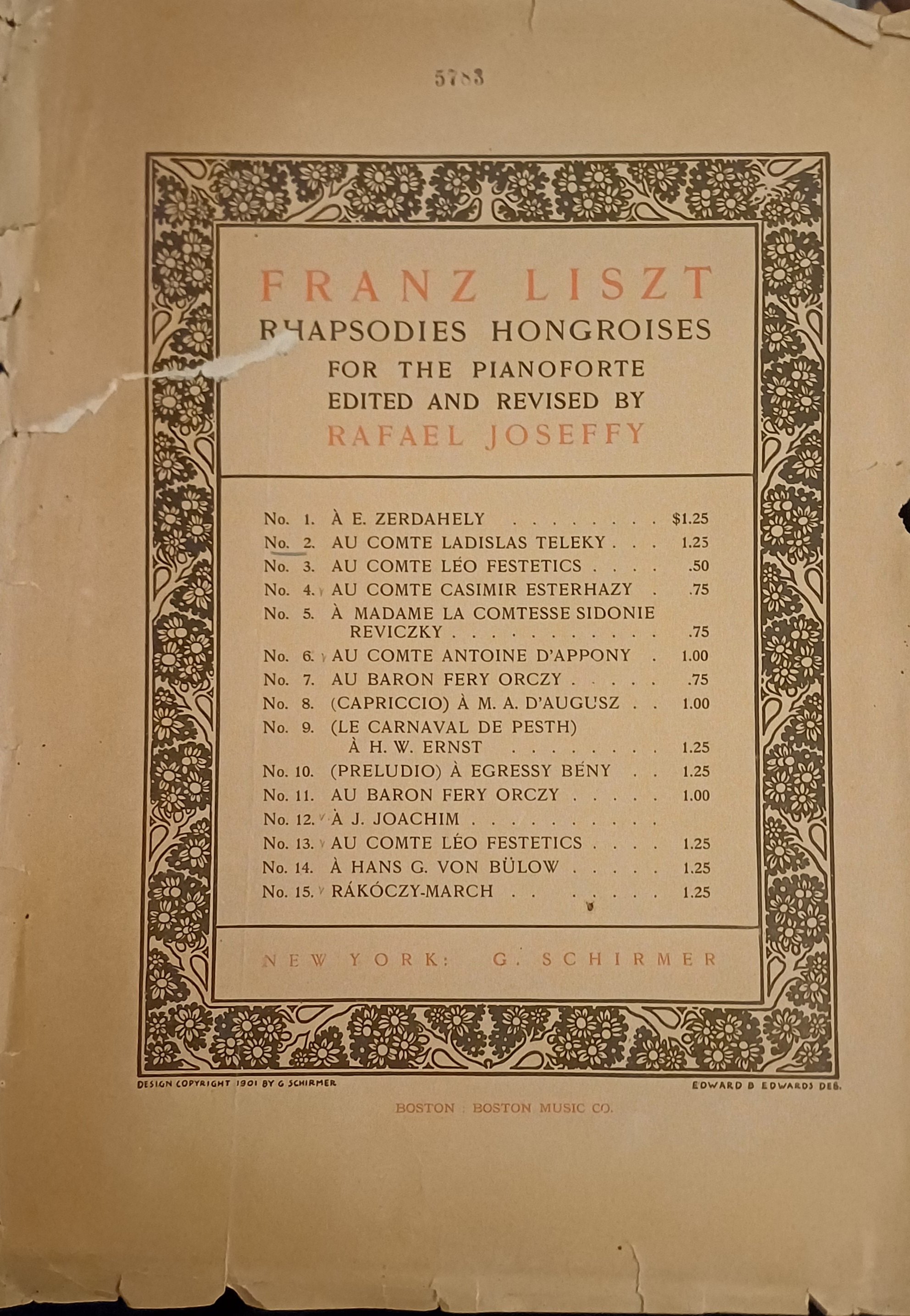
G. Schirmer's 1901 edition of Franz Liszt's Rhapsodies Hongroises

Schirmer came from a family of musical instrument makers. Both his grandfather and his father Rudolph E. Schirmer were piano makers at the Court of Sondershausen.

In the summer of 1840, his father emigrated with the family to New York City; Gustav got a job at the music store Scharfenberg & Luis and soon became the managing director of the music store of Kerksieg & Bruesing Company in 1854. In 1861, he took over this business together with B. Beer; both ran it until 1866 under the name of Beer & Schirmer. In the same year, Schirmer took over the company completely and changed its name to G. Schirmer, Inc., and the company would later became one of the largest music publishers in the United States and in the world. He was considered:

A publisher with an artistic conscience; it was his lifework to elevate the public taste, not to win mere commercial success by catering to popular wants.

Schirmer died on August 6, 1893 at the age of 63 on a journey to Germany, which he had undertaken in the hope of restoring his ailing health. His sons Rudolph Edward Schirmer (1859–1919) and Gustave Schirmer (1864–1907) took over the company and expanded it further. Later in time, his grandson Rudolph Edward Schirmer Jr. would become chairman of the board of the company.
