= Oscar Sonneck =

U.S. librarian, editor, and musicologist (1873–1928)

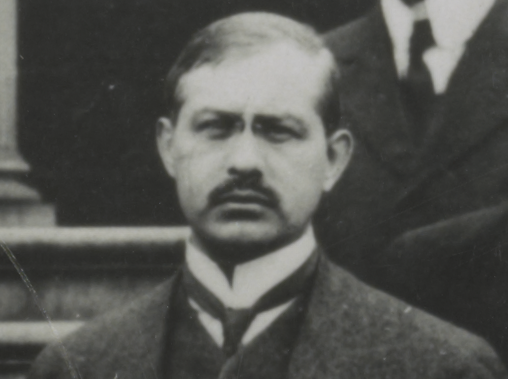
- Oscar Sonneck en 1914.
- Born: October 6, 1873; Jersey City
- Died: October 30, 1928 (aged 55)
- Occupation: Librarian

Oscar George Theodore Sonneck (October 6, 1873 – October 30, 1928) was a U.S. librarian, editor, and musicologist.

== Biography ==
Sonneck was born in Jersey City. He studied philosophy and musicology in Germany at the universities of Heidelberg and Munich.

From 1902 to 1917, he was head of the music division of the Library of Congress, and as such created a significant music library. From 1915 to 1928, he was also editor of The Musical Quarterly. As a writer, he specialized in the history of early (before the 19th century) American music. He died in New York City, aged 55.

The Society for American Music was created in his honor, and initially named after him.

As a writer, he specialized in the history of American music, and his publications laid the foundation for the scholarly study of music in the U.S. Sonneck understood how important a bibliographical basis was for making musical studies. As a documentary historian, bibliographer, cataloguer, editor and critic, Oscar Sonneck is recognized as the first scholar of early music in America.

From 1918, he was honorary librarian of the New York Beethoven Association. The collection of Beethoveniana he built up came to the New York Public Library in 1940.

== Works ==
- A Bibliography of Early Secular American Music (1905, rev. ed. 1945)
- Early Concert-Life in America (1907)
- Report on "The Star-Spangled Banner", "Hail Columbia", "America", "Yankee Doodle" (1909)
- The Star-Spangled Banner (1914)
- Catalogue of Opera Librettos Printed before 1800 (2 vol., 1914)
- Early Opera in America (1915)
- Vier pessimistische Lieder, op. 17 (Universal-Edition Ä.G., Vienna & New York, 1922)
