= The Cisco Kid =

Fictional character

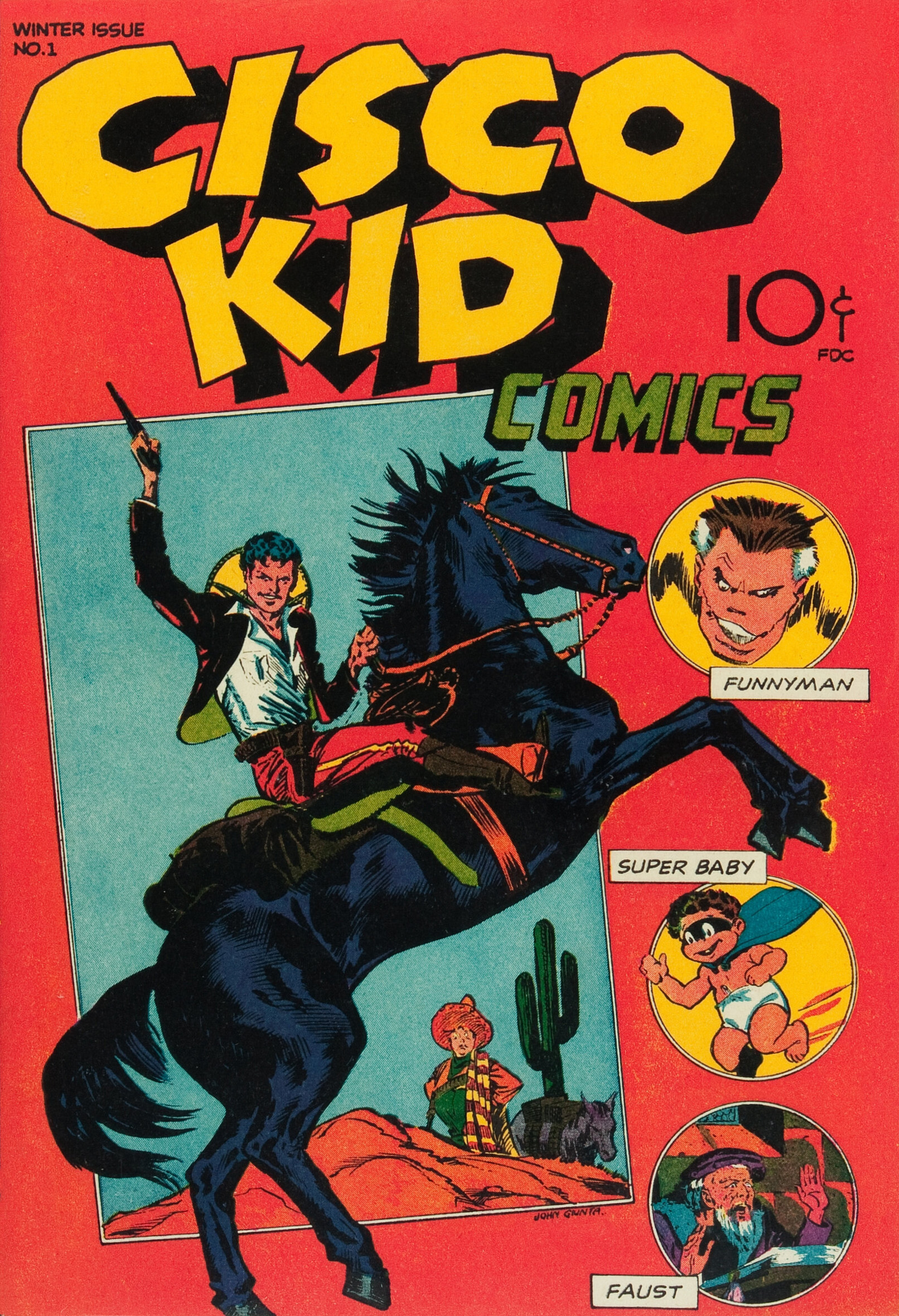
First issue of The Cisco Kid

The Cisco Kid is a fictional character found in numerous film, radio, television and comic book series based on the fictional Western character created by O. Henry in his 1907 short story "The Caballero's Way", published in Everybody's Magazine, vol. 17 (July 1907), as well as in the collection Heart of the West (1907). Originally a murderous criminal in O. Henry's story, the Kid was depicted as a heroic Mexican caballero in later film, radio, and television adaptations.

== "The Caballero's Way" (short story) ==
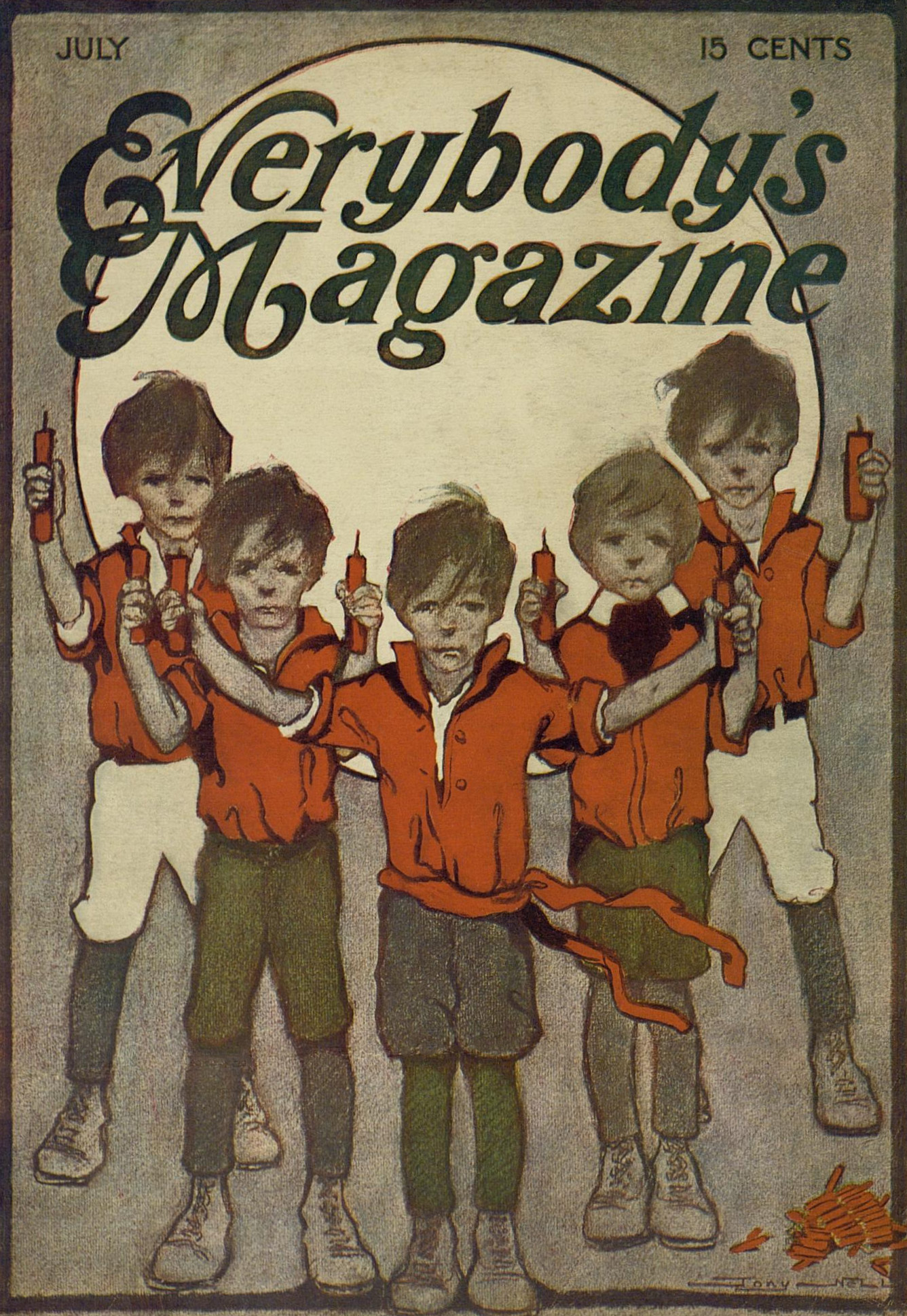
First appearance in Everybody's Magazine

In O. Henry's original story, the character is a 25-year-old desperado in the Texas–Mexico border country who bears little resemblance to later interpretations of the character. He kills for sport and is responsible for at least eighteen deaths. His real name is possibly Goodall ("This hombre they call the Kid—Goodall is his name, ain't it?"); no first name is given in the story. The Kid's mixed-ancestry girlfriend, Tonia Perez, both fears and loves him. When Texas Ranger Lieutenant Sandridge arrives at her home, seeking news of the Cisco Kid, they fall in love. Sandridge begins visiting twice a week. Eventually the Kid visits Tonia's house and finds them together:

Ten yards from his hiding-place, in the shade of the jacal, sat his Tonia calmly plaiting a rawhide lariat. So far she might surely escape condemnation; women have been known, from time to time, to engage in more mischievous occupations. But if all must be told, there is to be added that her head reposed against the broad and comfortable chest of a tall red-and-yellow man, and that his arm was about her, guiding her nimble small fingers that required so many lessons at the intricate six-strand plait.

He overhears Tonia tell Sandridge that she heard the Kid was in the area, and that she assumes the Kid will visit her soon. She says she will send Sandridge word of the Kid's whereabouts by Gregorio, "the small son of old Luisa", in time for Sandridge to ride off with a posse, find the Kid and kill him. Sandridge departs and shortly the Kid appears, pretending he has just arrived. The Kid sends a message to Sandridge through Domingo Sales, who claims that Gregorio is "too ill of a fever to ride". The message says that the Kid has arrived and explains that the Kid has exchanged clothes with Tonia to foil pursuers. Sandridge returns to Tonia's home and sees two figures in the moonlight: one in men's clothing and the other in women's. The one in women's clothing rides away. Assuming this to be the Kid, Sandridge ambushes and shoots the figure. The victim is Tonia, the Kid having tricked Sandridge into killing his girlfriend.

== Films ==
Numerous films have featured the character, beginning in the silent film era with The Caballero's Way (1914). There is a disagreement as to who actually played the part of the Cisco Kid. In the cemetery records of Stanley Herbert Dunn, it is stated that he played the part.

For his portrayal of the Kid in the early sound film In Old Arizona (1928), Warner Baxter won the second Best Actor Oscar. This film was a revised version of the original story, in which the Kid is portrayed in a positive light. It was directed by Irving Cummings and Raoul Walsh, who was originally slated to play the lead until a jackrabbit jumping through a windshield cost him an eye while on location. In 1930, Fox Film Corporation discovered they held rights to make only one film based on O. Henry's story. To circumvent this, they released The Arizona Kid - essentially a Cisco Kid knockoff starring Baxter as Chico Cabrillo, the Arizona Kid, The following year, they properly released The Cisco Kid with Baxter, Conchita Montenegro, and Edmund Lowe. In 1931, Fox Film Corporation produced a sound version with Baxter, Conchita Montenegro, and Edmund Lowe.

The film series began with The Return of the Cisco Kid (1939), featuring Baxter in the title role with Cesar Romero as his sidekick, Lopez, Chris-Pin Martin as the other sidekick, Gordito ("Fatty"), Lynn Bari as his mistaken love interest, Ann Carver, Henry Hull as her wayward grandfather, and Ward Bond in the lowest-billed role as "Tough", whose one scene shows him beaten into unconsciousness by the unscrupulous Sheriff McNally (Robert Barrat).

Romero took over the lead role of Cisco and Martin continued to play Gordito in six further films before the series was suspended with America's entry into World War II in 1941. Duncan Renaldo took over the reins as the Kid when Monogram Pictures revived the series in 1945 with The Cisco Kid Returns, which also introduced the Kid's best-known sidekick, Pancho, played by Martin Garralaga. Pancho also became established as his sidekick in other media. Neither Gordito nor Pancho is in the original story. After three Renaldo/Cisco films, Gilbert Roland played the character in a half-dozen 1946–1947 films beginning with The Gay Cavalier (1946). Renaldo then returned to the role with Leo Carrillo as Pancho. They made five films, with Renaldo assuming the flowery "Charro" suit in the final film. He would wear that throughout the TV series that followed.

=== List of films ===
- The Caballero's Way (1914) – William R. Dunn.
- The Border Terror (1919) – Vester Pegg
- In Old Arizona (1928) – Warner Baxter
- The Cisco Kid (1931) – Warner Baxter
- The Stolen Jools (1931) – Warner Baxter
- The Return of the Cisco Kid (1939) – Warner Baxter
- The Cisco Kid and the Lady (1939) – Cesar Romero
- Viva Cisco Kid (1940) – Cesar Romero
- Lucky Cisco Kid (1940) – Cesar Romero
- The Gay Caballero (1940) – Cesar Romero
- Romance of the Rio Grande (1941) – Cesar Romero
- Ride on Vaquero (1941) – Cesar Romero
- The Cisco Kid Returns (1945) – Duncan Renaldo
- In Old New Mexico (1945) – Duncan Renaldo
- South of the Rio Grande (1945) – Duncan Renaldo
- The Gay Cavalier (1946) – Gilbert Roland
- South of Monterey (1946) – Gilbert Roland
- Beauty and the Bandit (1946) – Gilbert Roland
- Riding the California Trail (1947) – Gilbert Roland
- Robin Hood of Monterey (1947) – Gilbert Roland
- King of the Bandits (1947) – Gilbert Roland
- The Valiant Hombre (1948) – Duncan Renaldo
- The Gay Amigo (1949) – Duncan Renaldo
- The Daring Caballero (1949) – Duncan Renaldo
- Satan's Cradle (1949) – Duncan Renaldo
- The Girl from San Lorenzo (1950) – Duncan Renaldo
- The Cisco Kid (1994) (TV film) – Jimmy Smits

== Radio ==
The Cisco Kid came to radio October 2, 1942, with Jackson Beck in the title role and Louis Sorin as Pancho. With Vicki Vola, Bryna Raeburn, and Mark Smith in supporting roles and Michael Rye announcing, this weekly series continued on Mutual until February 14, 1945. It was followed by a thrice weekly series on a Mutual-Don Lee regional network in 1946, starring Jack Mather in the title role, who continued to head the cast in the syndicated radio series of more than 600 episodes from 1947 to 1956. For this version, Pancho was originally played by Harry E. Lang. Following Lang's death in 1953, Mel Blanc played the role until the series ended.

Aimed at youngsters, the radio series depicted the Cisco Kid as a virtuous wanderer and quasi-Robin Hood figure, often erroneously believed to be on the wrong side of law due to his habit of tangling with "the rich and greedy" who are victimizing the poor. Episodes ended with one or the other of them making a corny joke about the adventure they had just completed. They would laugh, saying, "'Oh, Pancho!" "'Oh, Cisco!", before galloping off, while laughing.

=== Episode guide ===
| Number | Title | Airdate | Length | Notes |
|---|---|---|---|---|
| 001 | Disappearing Bullet | 520722 | 27m00s | Man gets swindled at cards and loses everything he has to a crooked dealer and ends up being accused of murder. |
| 002 | The Meanest Man in Arizona | 520724 | 27m58s | |
| 003 | The Man Trapped in the Cave | 520729 | 27m23s | |

== Television series and movies ==
Renaldo returned to the role for the popular 156-episode Ziv Television series The Cisco Kid (1950–1956), notable as the first TV series filmed in color.

For the 1950s TV series, the Cisco Kid's sidekick Pancho was portrayed by Leo Carrillo, riding a Palomino named Loco. The Cisco Kid's horse was named Diablo.

After a long absence, the character galloped back onto TV screens in the 1994 made-for-TV movie The Cisco Kid, starring Jimmy Smits with Cheech Marin as Pancho.

The TV episodes and the 1994 movie, like the radio series, ended with one or the other of them making a corny joke about the adventure they had just completed. They would laugh, saying, "Oh, Pancho!" "Oh, Cisco!", before galloping off, while laughing, into the sunset, and Spanish-styled Western theme music was heard as the credits rolled. Throughout the TV series, Carrillo addressed Renaldo as "Cisco", and others (mostly Anglo characters) refer to him as "the Kid" (Renaldo was 46 years old when the TV series began). Although both Pancho and Cisco are clearly identifiable as Mexicans, throughout the entire series they spoke to each other in English, with Pancho speaking a thickly accented and very tortured English, as if the two of them were not both fluent and comfortable in English: however Carrillo had been using this characterization in movies already for many years.

While the character's real name is never mentioned on the TV series, most fans and followers from the movie series in the 1940s and the books know that he is Juan Carlos Francisco Antonio Hernandez. In Series 1, Ep. 2, 20:59 "Counterfeit Money" Pancho identifies himself as "Pancho [Francisco] Fernando Miguel de Cornejo".

== Comics ==
- Cisco Kid Comics, a one-shot comic book by Baily Publishing, appeared on newsstands in 1944.
- Dell Comics published 41 issues of The Cisco Kid from 1950 to 1958.
- José Luis Salinas and Rod Reed drew the Cisco Kid comic strip, syndicated by King Features from 1951 to 1967.
- Moonstone Books has, as of 2009, published six graphic novels about the Kid. In Wyatt Earp: Justice Riders, Cisco joins Wyatt Earp, Geronimo, Belle Starr and Annie Oakley.

== Literature ==
- Nash Candelaria's 1988 short-story collection is entitled The Day the Cisco Kid Shot John Wayne.
- In Stephen King's short story "The Raft" and the 1987 horror film Creepshow 2, Pancho and Cisco are the nicknames used by the two ill-fated friends stranded on the raft.
- Dennis "Cisco" Wojciechowski, Mickey Haller's private investigator in The Brass Verdict and The Fifth Witness was nicknamed Cisco in honor of the Cisco Kid while he was affiliated with the Road Saints motorcycle gang.
- Moonstone Books published one crossover with Lone Ranger in The Lone Ranger Chronicles (2012).

== Music ==
- In Mark Lindsay's song "Arizona" (from the 1970 album Arizona), the title character of the song hangs up a poster of Pancho and Cisco.
- Elvis Presley, during his early 1971 concerts, used to wear a jumpsuit he referred to as "The Cisco Kid". The suit is featured on the cover of his 1972 Grammy-winning gospel album He Touched Me.
- War's song "The Cisco Kid" (from The World Is a Ghetto, 1972) reached number two on the US pop charts; the song also appeared on their 2008 Greatest Hits Live. A version was recorded by jazz organist Reuben Wilson on his album The Cisco Kid (Groove Merchant, 1973).
- Deep Purple's "Hey Cisco" (from Purpendicular, 1996) is loosely based on the radio show's characters.
- In Don Williams's 1998 song "Pancho" (from I Turn the Page), the Kid mournfully reflects on their friendship that has ended.
- The ska punk group Sublime released a song entitled "Cisco Kid" on their 1994 album Robbin' the Hood, including audio clips from the series.
- Method Man, Redman, and Cypress Hill recorded "Cisco Kid" which was featured on the soundtrack for the 2001 film How High. The song samples the War song "The Cisco Kid."
- In 2009, Mama's Pride band member Pat Liston released the song "My Daddy Knew the Cisco Kid."

== The names Pancho and Cisco ==
"Cisco" and "Pancho" are both nicknames given to men whose Spanish name is Francisco, which in English is "Francis".
