= A Father Without Knowing It =

1932 film directed by Robert Wyler

- Directed by: Robert Wyler
- Written by: Floyd Dell (play, novel); Gladys Lehman; Yves Mirande; Thomas Mitchell (play)
- Starring: Noël-Noël; Pierre Brasseur; Françoise Rosay
- Cinematography: Jacques Montéran; Émile Pierre
- Release date: 10 April 1932
- Running time: 99 minutes
- Country: France
- Language: French

A Father Without Knowing It (French: Papa sans le savoir) is a 1932 French comedy film directed by Robert Wyler and starring Noël-Noël, Pierre Brasseur and Françoise Rosay.

== Cast ==
- Noël-Noël as Léon Jacquet
- Pierre Brasseur as Jean
- Françoise Rosay as Madame Jacquet
- Janine Merrey as Jeannine
- Christiane Delyne as Madge
- Lugné-Poe as L'oncle
- Edmond Castel as Le marseillais
- Émile Saint-Ober
- Riri Bouché
- Christiane Dor
- Yvonne Yma
- Suzanne Delvé as Madame Bertrand

== See also ==
- The Little Accident (1930)
- Unexpected Father (1939)
- Casanova Brown (1944)
- Broadway comedy Little Accident (1928)

== Bibliography ==
- Crisp, Colin. Genre, Myth and Convention in the French Cinema, 1929-1939. Indiana University Press, 2002.
