= The Little Accident =

1930 film

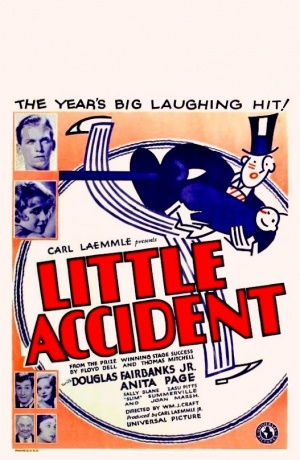
- Theatrical release poster
- Directed by: William James Craft
- Screenplay by: Gladys Lehman; Gene Towne
- Based on: Little Accident (play) by Floyd Dell and Thomas Mitchell
- Produced by: Carl Laemmle Jr.
- Starring: Douglas Fairbanks Jr. Anita Page; Sally Blane; ZaSu Pitts; Joan Marsh; Roscoe Karns
- Cinematography: Roy Overbaugh
- Edited by: Harry W. Lieb
- Production company: Universal Pictures
- Distributed by: Universal Pictures
- Release date: August 3, 1930
- Running time: 82 minutes
- Country: United States
- Language: English

The Little Accident is a 1930 American pre-Code comedy film directed by William James Craft and written by Gladys Lehman and Gene Towne, based on the 1927 novel An Unmarried Father by Floyd Dell and the 1928 play Little Accident by Dell and Thomas Mitchell. The film stars Douglas Fairbanks Jr., Anita Page, Sally Blane, ZaSu Pitts, Joan Marsh, and Roscoe Karns. The film was released on August 3, 1930, by Universal Pictures. It was remade by Universal in 1939 as Little Accident, and by RKO Radio Pictures in 1944 with Gary Cooper as Casanova Brown.

== Plot ==
On the day before his second wedding, a man finds out that his bride-to-be has had a baby.

== Cast ==
- Douglas Fairbanks Jr. as Norman Overbeck
- Anita Page as Isabel
- Sally Blane as Madge
- ZaSu Pitts as Monica
- Joan Marsh as Doris
- Roscoe Karns as Gilbert
- Slim Summerville as Hicks
- Henry Armetta as Rudolpho Amendelara
- Myrtle Stedman as Mrs. Overbeck
- Albert Gran as Mr. Overbeck
- Nora Cecil as Dr. Zernecke
- Bertha Mann as Miss Hemingway
- Gertrude Short as Miss Clark
- Dot Farley as Mrs. Van Dine

== See also ==
- A Father Without Knowing It (1932)
- Unexpected Father (1939)
- Casanova Brown (1944)
- Broadway comedy Little Accident (1928)
