= Casanova Brown =

1944 film by Sam Wood

- Theatrical release poster
- Directed by: Sam Wood
- Written by: Nunnally Johnson
- Based on: Little Accident by Floyd Dell and Thomas Mitchell
- Produced by: Nunnally Johnson
- Starring: Gary Cooper; Teresa Wright; Frank Morgan; Anita Louise
- Cinematography: John F. Seitz
- Edited by: Thomas Neff
- Music by: Arthur Lange
- Production companies: International Pictures; Christie Corporation; Nunnally Johnson Productions
- Distributed by: RKO Radio Pictures
- Release dates: August 5, 1944 (Premiere-France); August 23, 1944 (U.S.)
- Running time: 91 minutes
- Country: United States
- Language: English

Casanova Brown is a 1944 American comedy romantic film directed by Sam Wood, written by Nunnally Johnson, and starring Gary Cooper, Teresa Wright, and Frank Morgan. The film had its world premiere in western France after the Allies had liberated those territories following the D-Day Invasion. The film is based on the 1927 novel An Unmarried Father by Floyd Dell and the 1928 play Little Accident by Dell and Thomas Mitchell, which had been previously filmed by Universal Pictures in 1930 as The Little Accident and in 1939 as Little Accident.

== Plot ==
Arriving in a small town Rossmore, Illinois by train, college professor Casanova Brown is met by his socialite girlfriend Madge Ferris and tells her not to bring up his trip to New York, where he was trying, unsuccessfully, to publish a book about the notorious 18th-century womanizer, Casanova.

Cas decides to ask Madge to marry him, even though her father J.J. warns him against it, saying Madge is nothing but trouble. Just before the wedding, Cas leaves town because of a letter from a Dr. Martha Zernecke summoning him to a Chicago maternity hospital, but promises to be back in time for the wedding. About the letter and what he believes is behind it, Cas tells J.J. of his New York experience with Isabel Drury, of how they fell in love and decided to wed, only to have Cas repeatedly upset Isabel's mother by insulting her belief in astrology, ignoring her warnings that their union would be cursed, then inadvertently burning down the Drurys' house with a smouldering cigarette, he having hid the cigarette in discovering Mrs. Drury's anti-smoking stance. The Drurys had the marriage annulled, but Cas suspects Isabel may have now had his baby.

At the hospital, Cas goes through a battery of tests unaware of what they are for. After he is told by a nurse that the tests confirm he is a specimen of good health, he meets Dr. Zernecke who tells him about Isabel having had a baby girl, his baby girl, and that the tests were for their records in Isabel putting the baby up for adoption. When Cas reunites with Isabel who is still at the hospital, she confirms the baby is biologically his and that she is putting her up for adoption.

Cas disguises himself as a doctor and kidnaps the baby as he does not want Isabel to give their baby away. He hides out at a local hotel, in the process missing his wedding to Madge, and employs two of the hotel staff, Monica Case, a chambermaid, and Frank, the bell captain, to help him take care of the baby; they collectively employ extreme care for the baby. Figuring he can keep the baby if he is married, he proposes to "plain Jane" Monica, who accepts. With the baby in tow, Cas and Monica head to City Hall.

Isabel confesses to Dr. Zernecke that the adoption was just a ploy to bring Cas to the hospital and discover how he really felt about her and the baby in wanting him back in her life. With Cas, Monica and Frank using whatever means to learn about proper baby care which included Frank unwittingly contacting the hospital, Dr. Zernecke and Isabel have been aware of Cas' location all along and knew the baby was safe. Isabel, Mr. Drury, J.J. and Madge descend upon the hotel concurrently to find Cas. Ultimately, Cas, Isabel and the baby are able to be alone with each other, and upon the fact that Cas and Monica are not married coming to light as they had to wait three days as per the law in Chicago, Cas and Isabel decide to reconcile now as a family with their baby.

== Cast ==
- Gary Cooper as Casanova Brown
- Teresa Wright as Isabel Drury
- Frank Morgan as J.J. Ferris
- Anita Louise as Madge Ferris
- Edmund Breon as Mr. Drury (as Edmond Breon)
- Patricia Collinge as Mrs. Drury
- Jill Esmond as Dr. Zernecke
- Mary Treen as Monica Case, the Maid
- Emory Parnell as Frank, the Bell Captain
- Isobel Elsom as Mrs. Ferris
- Halliwell Hobbes as Charles, the Butler
- Charles Cane as Hicks
- Larry Olsen as Junior (as Larry Joe Olsen)
- Irving Bacon as Hotel manager
- Dorothy Tree as Nurse Clark
- Ann Evers as Nurse Petherbridge
- Grace Cunard as Relative at baby window

== Awards ==
The film was nominated for three Academy Awards: for Best Score (Arthur Lange), Best Sound, Recording (Thomas T. Moulton), and Best Art Direction (Perry Ferguson, Julia Heron).

== See also ==
- The Little Accident (1930)
- A Father Without Knowing It (1932)
- Unexpected Father (1939)
- Little Accident (1928 Broadway comedy)
- List of American films of 1944
