= Father's Son =

Father's Son can refer to:

- Father's Son (1931 film), a 1931 film
- Father's Son (1941 film), a 1941 film
- "Father's Son", a song by Celeste
