= Lee Patrick (actress) =

American actress (1901–1982)

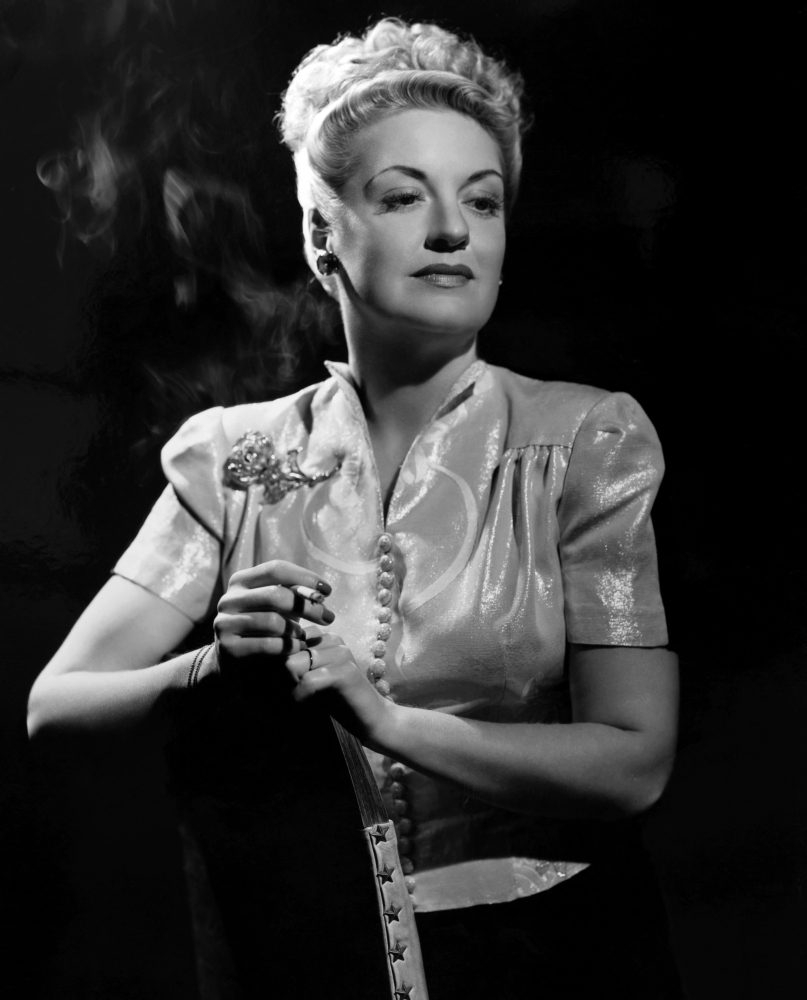
- Patrick, c. 1940
- Born: Lee Salome Patrick; November 22, 1901; New York City, U.S.
- Died: November 25, 1982 (aged 81); Laguna Beach, California, U.S.
- Occupation: Actress
- Years active: 1922–1975
- Spouse: Thomas Wood (m. 1937)

Lee Salome Patrick (November 22, 1901 – November 25, 1982) was an American actress whose career began in 1922 on the New York stage with her role in The Bunch and Judy which headlined Adele Astaire and featured Adele's brother Fred Astaire.

Patrick continued to perform in dozens of roles on the stage for the next decade, frequently in musicals and comedies, but also in dramatic parts like her 1931 performance as Meg in Little Women. She began to branch out into films in 1929. For half a century she created a creditable body of cinematic work, her most memorable being as Sam Spade's assistant Effie in The Maltese Falcon (1941), and her reprise of the role in the George Segal comedy sequel The Black Bird (1975). Her talents were showcased in comedies such as the Jack Benny film George Washington Slept Here (1942) and as one of the foils of Rosalind Russell in Auntie Mame (1958). Dramatic parts such as an asylum inmate in The Snake Pit (1948) and as Pamela Tiffin's mother in Summer and Smoke (1961) were another facet of her repertoire. She played numerous guest roles in American television, but became a staple for that medium during the two-year run of Topper. As Henrietta Topper, her comedic timing played well against Leo G. Carroll as her husband, and against that of the two ghosts played by Robert Sterling and Anne Jeffreys. Patrick lent her voice to various animated characters of The Alvin Show in the early 1960s.

== Personal life ==
Lee Salome Patrick was born on November 22, 1901, in New York City, to entertainment journalist Warren Patrick and Marie S. (Conrad) Patrick. By 1937, Patrick married newsman-writer-publicist Tom Wood, author of The Bright Side of Billy Wilder, Primarily, and remained married 45 years, until her death. They had no children. During her career in Hollywood, she was not in good standing with gossip columnist Louella Parsons, and this conflict kept her career stuck in the "B" ranks. Wood wrote a frank piece on Parsons which did not go over well with the columnist.

== Acting career ==
=== Stage ===
Patrick debuted on Broadway in November 1922 in the ensemble of The Bunch and Judy, which ran for eight weeks. In September 1924 she returned to Broadway in an 8-week run of The Green Beetle at the Klaw Theatre, portraying the lead characters' daughter who escaped a murder attempt.

The Undercurrent was only the first of 5 plays in which Patrick honed her talent in 1925. The Backslapper (1925) was a political drama that ran for 33 performances with Patrick in a supporting role as Mrs. Kennedy. Patrick performed more comedy later in 1925: Bachelors' Brides was a farce in which she played a guardian angel; It All Depends was another comedy, The farce A Kiss in a Taxi completed Patrick's stage work of 1925.

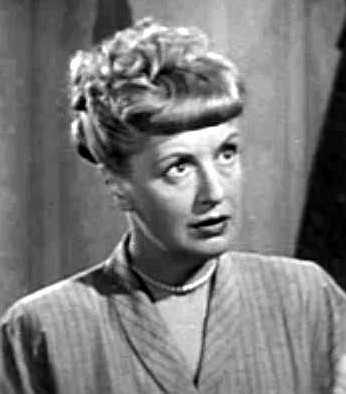
Patrick in Inner Sanctum (1948)

The Shelf (1926) ran for 32 performances. Patrick acted in three plays in 1927: the 12-performance comedy Baby Mine; the equally brief The Matrimonial Bed; and Nightstick, an 84-performance run through January 1928. The 24-performance The Common Sin was the only other play she did in 1928.

June Moon gave Patrick her longest run of her stage career, 273 performances in 1929 and 1930, and 48 performances in 1933. She rounded out 1930 with the 13-performance run of Room of Dreams. Privilege Car was her first play of 1931, but she soon was on stage in the musical Friendship and finished out that year with 17 performances as Meg in Little Women One of the briefest plays of her career was The Girl Outside in 1932, which ran for 8 performances; however, that one came on the heels of Blessed Event that had run for 115 performances.

After Shooting Star in 1933, and Slightly Delirious, her only play of 1934, Patrick began to look towards a film career. Knock on Wood and Abide With Me did not fare much better for her. She had a long run of 169 performances in Stage Door in 1936–1937, but only did one more Broadway play after that, the comedy Michael Drops In.

=== Feature films ===
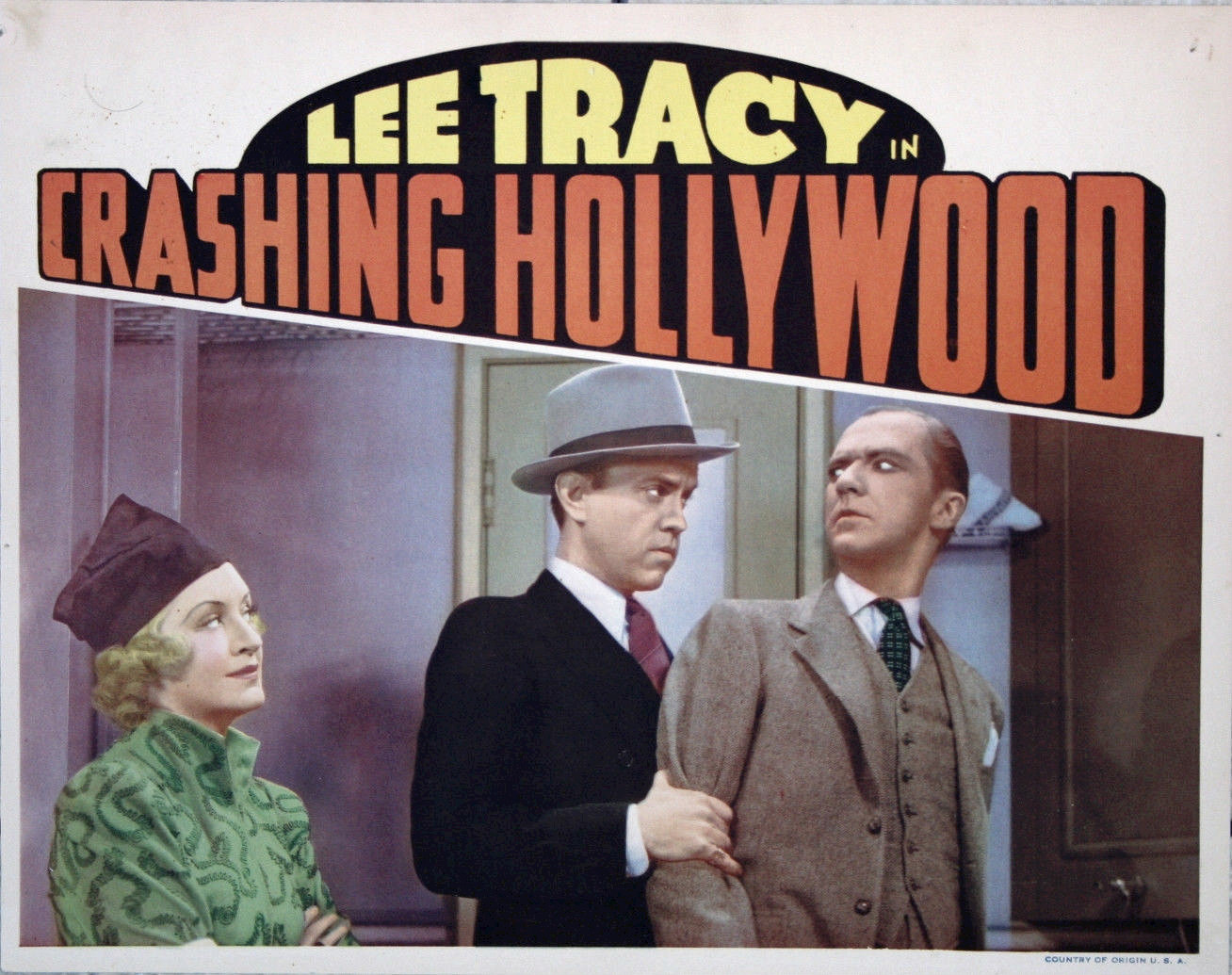
Lobby card for Crashing Hollywood with Patrick (left) and Lee Tracy (far right)

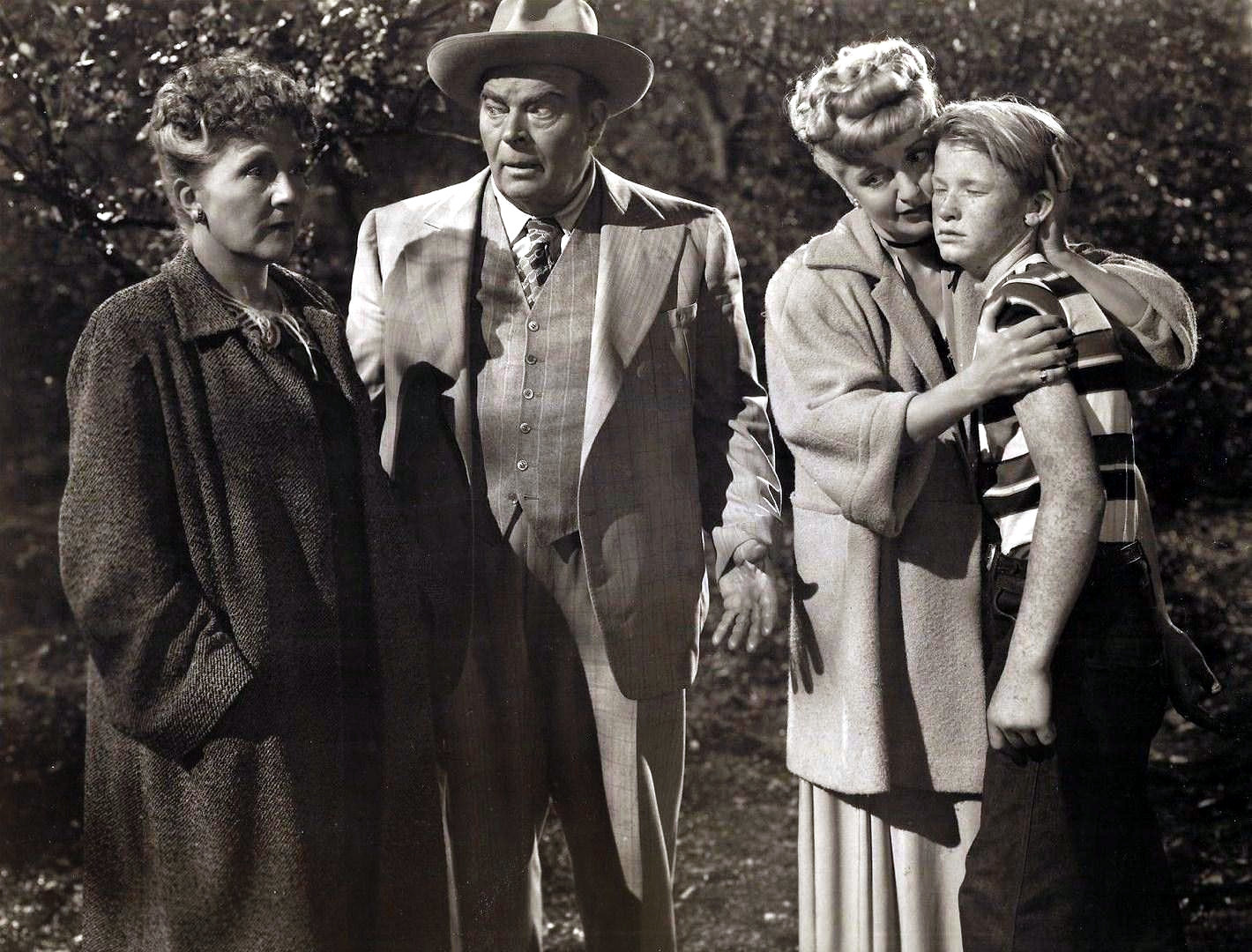
Cast of Inner Sanctum L-R Nana Bryant, Billy House, Lee Patrick and Dale Belding

Patrick had the starring role in her first film, Strange Cargo, an early American sound production for Pathé released on March 31, 1929. In this remake of producer Benjamin Glazer's Missing Man, British actor George Barraud played her leading man. It was another six years before she made another film: The Casino Murder Case for MGM. She had a bit part as a nurse in the film, which brought her together for the first time with Leo G. Carroll, with whom two decades later she worked on the television series Topper.

She remained in Hollywood and appeared in Border Cafe (1937). Over the next several years, she played numerous supporting roles, without attracting much critical attention. Patrick appeared in The Maltese Falcon (1941) as Effie Perine, the loyal and quick-thinking secretary of Humphrey Bogart's Sam Spade. Perine was one of Patrick's more enduring film characterizations. The same year, she appeared in a leading role as an intelligent, crime-solving nurse in The Nurse's Secret.

Her other films include The Sisters (1938), Footsteps in the Dark (1941), Now, Voyager (1942), Mrs. Parkington (1944), Gambler's Choice (1944), Mildred Pierce (1945), Wake Up and Dream (1946), Caged (1950), There's No Business Like Show Business (1954), Vertigo (1958), Auntie Mame (1958), Pillow Talk (1959), Summer and Smoke (1961), and 7 Faces of Dr. Lao (1964).

In the mid-1960s, Lee retired to travel and paint in Orange County, California, but was coaxed back one more time to Hollywood. Her final film role was a reprise of the character Effie Perine in The Black Bird, a spoof of the Maltese Falcon, starring George Segal as Sam Spade, Jr., who in the storyline was forced to continue his father's work and to keep his increasingly sarcastic secretary; the film attempted to turn its revered predecessor into a comedy. The only actor joining her from the original cast was Elisha Cook Jr. The film was released on December 25, 1975.

=== Television ===
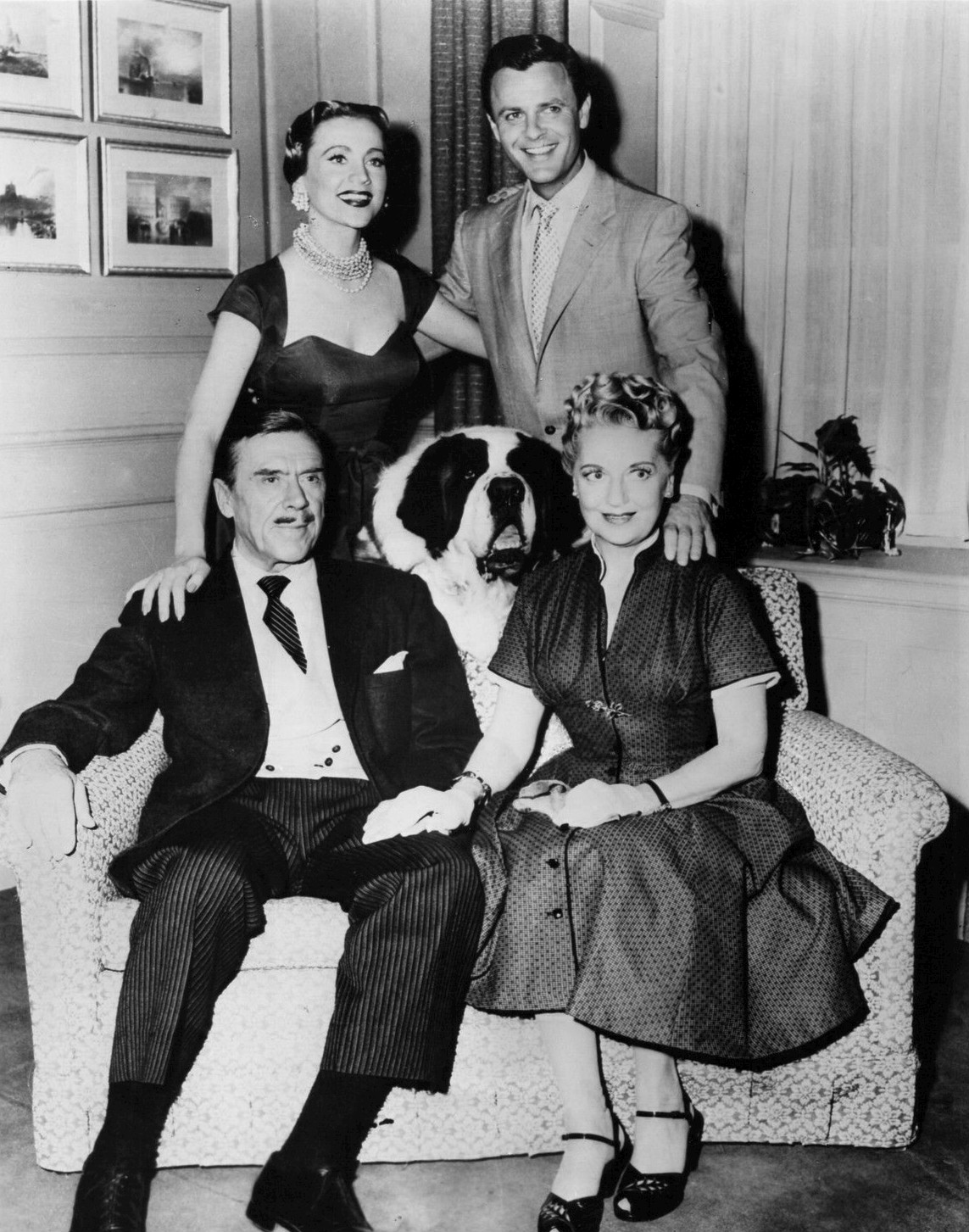
Cast of Topper (1953): (standing) Anne Jeffreys and Robert Sterling; (seated from left) Leo G. Carroll, Buck (dog playing "Neil"), and Patrick

Patrick appeared on television in the sitcom Topper (1953–1955) with Leo G. Carroll, Anne Jeffreys, and Robert Sterling.

She made several appearances as the mother of Ida Lupino in the sitcom Mr. Adams and Eve (1957–1958). In 1962 she played Mrs. Carreway, who mistook Marshal Micah Torrance to be her long lost husband, in The Rifleman episode “Guilty Conscience.” In 1963, she appeared as Aunt Wilma Howard in the episode "Skeleton in the Closet" of the sitcom The Real McCoys.

In 1965, she appeared as Mrs. Ashton Durham in the episode "It's a Dog's World" of Hazel and as Cora Prichard in an episode titled "Noblesse Oblige" during the show's final season. She turned in a voice performance as Mrs. Frumpington in an episode of the animated series The Alvin Show, which may be heard on the soundtrack LP by David Seville and The Chipmunks. Patrick made three appearances on I Married Joan.

== Death ==
Patrick died suddenly on November 25, 1982, from a heart seizure at Laguna Beach, California, three days after her 81st birthday.

== Acting credits ==
=== Stage ===
Plays (26)
Opening date	Closing date	Title	Role	Theatre	Notes	Refs
Nov 28, 1922	Jan 20, 1923	The Bunch and Judy	Ensemble	Globe Theatre	Adele Astaire headlined as Judy, Fred Astaire played dual roles in the play; Music by Jerome Kern; lyrics Anne Caldwell	
Sep 02, 1924	Oct 1924	The Green Beetle	Elsie Chandos	Klaw Theatre	Written by John Willard	
Feb 03, 1925	Feb 1925	The Undercurrent	Helen Mills	Cort Theatre	Written by William H. McMaster	
Apr 11, 1925	May 1925	The Backslapper	Mrs. Kennedy	Hudson Theatre	Written by Paul Dickey and Mann Page	
May 28, 1925	Jun 1925	Bachelors' Brides	Mary Bowing/Percy's Guardian Angel	Cort Theatre	Written by Charles Horace Malcolm	
Aug 10, 1925	Aug 1925	It All Depends	Maida Spencer	Vanderbilt Theatre	Written by Kate McLauren	
Aug 25, 1925	Oct 1925	A Kiss in a Taxi	Angele	Ritz Theatre	Claudette Colbert appeared as Ginette in her second play; Adaptation by Clifford Grey from the French play by Maurice Hennequin and Pierre Veber	
Sep 27, 1926	Oct 1926	The Shelf	Caroline Wendham	Morosco Theatre	Written by Dorrance Davis	
Jun 09, 1927	Jun 1927	Baby Mine	Zoie Hardy	Chapin's 46th Street Theatre	Humphrey Bogart appeared in the male lead as Alfred Hardy; written by Margaret Mayo	
Oct 12, 1927	Oct 1927	The Matrimonial Bed	Juliette Corton	Ambassador Theatre	Adapted by Seymour Hicks from the French play by André Mouëzy-Éon and Yves Mirande	
Nov 10, 1927	Jan 1928	Nightstick	Joan Manning	Selwyn Theatre	Written by John Wray, J. C. Nugent, Elliott Nugent and Elaine Sterne Carrington	
Oct 15, 1928	Nov 1928	The Common Sin	"Bobo" Aster	Forrest Theatre	Written by Willard Mack	
Oct 09, 1929	Jun 04, 1930	June Moon	Eileen	Broadhurst Theatre	Based on the Ring Lardner short story "Some Like Them Cold"; the play was written by Lardner and George S. Kaufman	
Nov 05, 1930	Nov 1930	Room of Dreams	Jacqueline Emontin	Empire Theatre	Written by Ernest Raoul Weiss	
Mar 03, 1931	Apr 1931	Privilege Car	Mayme Taylor	48th Street Theatre	Written by Edward J. Foran and Williard Keefe	
Aug 31, 1931	Sep 1931	Friendship	Louise Dale	Fulton Theatre	George M. Cohan headlined as Joe Townsend, and his daughter Helen Cohan appeared as Jean; written and produced by Cohan	
Dec 07, 1931	Dec 1931	Little Women	Meg	Playhouse Theatre	Jessie Royce Landis appeared as Jo; adapted from the Louisa May Alcott book by Marian de Forest	
Feb 12, 1932	May 1932	Blessed Event	Gladys Price	Longacre Theatre	Written by Manuel Seff and Forrest Wilson	
Oct 24, 1932	Oct 1932	The Girl Outside	The Girl	Little Theatre	Written by John King Hodges and Samuel Merwyn	
May 15, 1933	Jun 1933	June Moon	Eileen	Ambassador Theatre	Reprise of the play written by Ring Lardner and George S. Kaufman	
Jun 12, 1933	Jun 1933	Shooting Star	Flo Curtis	Selwyn Theatre	Written by Noel Pierce and Bernard C. Schoenfeld	
Dec 31, 1934	Jan 1935	Slightly Delirious	Millicent Hargraves	Little Theatre	Written by Bernard J. McOwen and Robert F. Adkins	
May 28, 1935	Jun 1935	Knock on Wood	Pat Moran	Cort Theatre	Written by Allen Rivkin	
Nov 21, 1935	Dec 1935	Abide With Me	Julia Field	Ritz Theatre	Written by Clare Boothe Brokaw (Luce)	
Oct 22, 1936	Mar 1937	Stage Door	Judith Canfield	Music Box Theatre	Written by George S. Kaufman and Edna Ferber	
Dec 27, 1938	Jan 1939	Michael Drops In	Nan McNeil	John Golden Theatre	Written by William DuBois	

=== Film ===
Key to studio abbreviations

20th	20th Century-Fox	CP	Columbia Pictures	FC	Film Classics
MGM	Metro-Goldwyn-Mayer	Par	Paramount	Path	Pathé
RP	Republic Pictures	RKO	RKO Radio	UA	United Artists
Uni	Universal	WB	Warner Bros.

Feature films (70)
Year	Title	Role	Director	Producer	Distributor	Other cast members	Notes	Refs.
1929	Strange Cargo	Diana Foster	Benjamin Glazer, Arthur Gregor	Benjamin Glazer	Path	George Barraud		
1935	The Casino Murder Case	Nurse	Edwin L. Marin	Edwin L. Marin	MGM	Paul Lukas		
1937	Border Cafe	Ellie	Lew Landers	Robert Sisk	RKO	Harry Carey, Marjorie Lord		
1937	You Can't Beat Love	Minor Role	Christy Cabanne	Robert Sisk	RKO	Preston Foster	(scenes deleted)	
1937	Music for Madame	Nora Burns	John G. Blystone	Jesse L. Lasky	RKO	Nino Martini		
1937	Danger Patrol	Nancy Donovan	Lew Landers	Maury M. Cohen	RKO	Harry Carey		
1938	Crashing Hollywood	Goldie Tibbets	Lew Landers	Cliff Reid	RKO	Lee Tracy		
1938	Night Spot	Flo Bradley	Christy Cabanne	Robert Sisk	RKO	Allan Lane		
1938	Maid's Night Out	Kissing Milk Customer	Ben Holmes	Robert Sisk	RKO	Joan Fontaine, Allan Lane	Uncredited	
1938	Condemned Women	Anna 'Big Annie' Barry	Lew Landers	Robert Sisk	RKO	Louis Hayward		
1938	Law of the Underworld	Dorothy Palmer	Lew Landers	Robert Sisk	RKO	Chester Morris		
1938	The Sisters	Flora Gibbon	Anatole Litvak	Anatole Litvak	WB	Errol Flynn, Bette Davis		
1939	Fisherman's Wharf	Stella	Bernard Vorhaus	Sol Lesser	RKO	Bobby Breen, Leo Carrillo		
1939	Invisible Stripes	Molly	Lloyd Bacon	Hal B. Wallis, Jack L. Warner	WB	George Raft, William Holden		
1940	Saturday's Children	Florrie Sands	Vincent Sherman	Hal B. Wallis	WB	John Garfield, Anne Shirley, Claude Rains		
1940	Ladies Must Live	Mary Larrabee	Noel M. Smith	William Jacobs, Bryan Foy	WB	George Reeves, Roscoe Karns		
1940	Money and the Woman	Martha Church	William K. Howard	William Jacobs, Bryan Foy	WB	Jeffrey Lynn, Brenda Marshall, John Litel		
1940	City for Conquest	Gladys	Anatole Litvak	William Cagney	WB	James Cagney		
1940	South of Suez	Delia Snedeker	Lewis Seiler	Bryan Foy	WB	George Brent, George Tobias		
1940	Father is a Prince	Tess Haley	Noel M. Smith	William Jacobs, Bryan Foy	WB	Grant Mitchell, Nana Bryant		
1941
1941	Honeymoon for Three	Mrs. Pettijohn	Lloyd Bacon	Hal B. Wallis	WB	Ann Sheridan		
1941	Footsteps in the Dark	Blondie White	Lloyd Bacon	Hal B. Wallis	WB	Errol Flynn		
1941	The Nurse's Secret	Ruth Adams	Noel M. Smith	Bryan Foy	WB	Regis Toomey		
1941	Million Dollar Baby	Josie La Rue	Curtis Bernhardt	Hal B. Wallis	WB	Ronald Reagan		
1941	Kisses for Breakfast	Betty Trent	Lewis Seiler	Harlan Thompson	WB	Jane Wyatt		
1941	The Smiling Ghost	Rose Fairchild	Lewis Seiler	Kenneth Gamet	WB	Alexis Smith		
1941	The Maltese Falcon	Effie Perine	John Huston	Hal B. Wallis	WB	Humphrey Bogart, Mary Astor, Gladys George, Peter Lorre, Sydney Greenstreet		
1941	Dangerously They Live	Nurse Johnson	Robert Florey	Bryan Foy	WB	John Garfield		
1942	In This Our Life	Betty Wilmoth	John Huston	Hal B. Wallis	WB	Bette Davis, Olivia de Havilland		
1942	Somewhere I'll Find You	Eve "Evie" Manning	Wesley Ruggles	Pandro S. Berman	MGM	Clark Gable, Lana Turner		
1942	Now, Voyager	'Deb' McIntyre	Irving Rapper	Hal B. Wallis	WB	Bette Davis, Paul Henreid. Claude Rains, Gladys Cooper		
1942	George Washington Slept Here	Rina Leslie	William Keighley	Jerry Wald	WB	Jack Benny, Ann Sheridan		
1942	A Night to Remember	Polly Franklin	Richard Wallace	Samuel Bischoff	CP	Loretta Young, Brian Aherne		
1943	Jitterbugs	Dorcas	Malcolm St. Clair	Sol M. Wurtzel	20th	Stan Laurel, Oliver Hardy		
1943	Nobody's Darling	Miss Pennington	Anthony Mann	Harry Grey	RP	Louis Calhern		
1943	Larceny with Music	Agatha Parkinson	Edward C. Lilley	Edward C. Lilley	Uni	Leo Carrillo, Kitty Carlisle, William Frawley		
1944	Moon Over Las Vegas	Mrs. Blake	Jean Yarbrough	Jean Yarbrough	Uni	Anne Gwynne, David Bruce		
1944	Gambler's Choice	Fay Lawrence	Frank McDonald	William H. Pine, William C. Thomas	Par	Chester Morris, Nancy Kelly		
1944	Mrs. Parkington	Madeleine Parkington Swann	Tay Garnett	Leon Gordon	MGM	Greer Garson, Walter Pidgeon		
1944	Faces in the Fog	Cora Elliott	John English	Armand Schaefer	RP	Jane Withers		
1945	Keep Your Power Dry	Gladys Hopkins	Edward Buzzell	George Haight	MGM	Lana Turner, Agnes Moorehead, Natalie Schafer		
1945	See My Lawyer	Sally Evans	Edward F. Cline	Edmund L. Hartmann	Uni	Ole Olsen		
1945	Over 21	Mrs. Foley	Charles Vidor	Sidney Buchman	CP	Irene Dunne		
1945	Mildred Pierce	Maggie Biederhof	Michael Curtiz	Jerry Wald	WB	Joan Crawford		
1946	The Walls Came Tumbling Down	Susan	Lothar Mendes	Albert J. Cohen	CP	Edgar Buchanan		
1946	Strange Journey	Mrs. Lathrop	James Tinling	Sol M. Wurtzel	20th	Paul Kelly		
1946	Wake Up and Dream	The Blonde	Lloyd Bacon	Walter Morosco	20th	John Payne, June Haver		
1947	Mother Wore Tights	Lil	Walter Lang	Lamar Trotti	20th	Betty Grable		
1948	Singin' Spurs	Clarissa Bloomsbury	Ray Nazarro	Colbert Clark	CP	Hoosier Hot Shots, Jay Silverheels		
1948	Big Sister Blues	Karen Saunders	Alvin Ganzer	Harry Grey	Par	John Ridgely	Short	
1948	Inner Sanctum	Ruth Bennett	Lew Landers	Richard B. Morros, Samuel Rheiner, Walter Shenson	FC	Charles Russell		
1948	The Snake Pit	Asylum inmate	Anatole Litvak	Robert Bassler, Anatole Litvak, Darryl F. Zanuck	20th	Olivia de Havilland		
1949	The Doolins of Oklahoma	Melissa Price	Gordon Douglas	Harry Joe Brown	CP	Randolph Scott		
1950	Caged	Elvira Powell	John Cromwell	Jerry Wald	WB	Eleanor Parker, Agnes Moorehead, Ellen Corby, Hope Emerson		
1950	The Lawless	Jan Dawson	Joseph Losey	William H. Pine, William C. Thomas	Par	Macdonald Carey		
1950	The Fuller Brush Girl	Claire Simpson	Lloyd Bacon	S. Sylvan Simon	CP	Lucille Ball		
1951	Tomorrow Is Another Day	Janet Higgins	Felix E. Feist	Henry Blanke	WB	Ruth Roman		
1953	Take Me to Town	Rose	Douglas Sirk	Leonard Goldstein, Ross Hunter	Uni	Ann Sheridan		
1954	There's No Business Like Show Business	Marge	Walter Lang	Sol C. Siegel	20th	Ethel Merman, Donald O'Connor, Marilyn Monroe		
1958	Vertigo	Car Owner Mistaken for Madeleine	Alfred Hitchcock	Alfred Hitchcock	Par	James Stewart, Kim Novak		
1958	Auntie Mame	Doris Upson	Morton DaCosta	Morton DaCosta	WB	Rosalind Russell		
1959	Pillow Talk	Mrs. Walters	Michael Gordon	Ross Hunter, Martin Melcher	Uni	Rock Hudson, Doris Day		
1960	Visit to a Small Planet	Rheba Spelding	Norman Taurog	Norman Taurog	Par	a Jerry Lewis comedy		
1961	Goodbye Again	Mme Fleury	Anatole Litvak	Anatole Litvak	UA	Ingrid Bergman, Anthony Perkins	Uncredited	
1961	Summer and Smoke	Mrs. Ewell	Peter Glenville	Paul Nathan, Hal B. Wallis	Par	Laurence Harvey, Geraldine Page		
1962	A Girl Named Tamiko	Mary Hatten	John Sturges	Joseph H. Hazen, Hal B. Wallis	Par	Laurence Harvey, France Nuyen		
1963	Wives and Lovers	Mrs. Swenson	John Rich	Edward Anhalt	Par	Janet Leigh		
1964	7 Faces of Dr. Lao	Mrs. Howard T. Cassan	George Pal	George Pal	MGM	Tony Randall		
1964	The New Interns	Housekeeper	John Rich	Robert Cohn	CP	Michael Callan, Barbara Eden		
1975	The Black Bird	Effie	David Giler	George Segal, Ray Stark, Lou Lombardo, Michael Levee	CP	George Segal, Stéphane Audran	(final film role)	

=== Television ===
Television episodes (38)
Year	Title	Role	Notes	Refs.
1948	Public Prosecutor	Mrs. Farrell	The Case of the Comic Strip Murder	
1949	Your Show Time		The Tenor	
1951	Racket Squad	Virginia Langley	The Case of the Vain Woman	
1952	Mark Saber	Mrs. Gaunt	The Case of the Midnight Murder	
1952	Boss Lady	Aggie	Recurring role, all 12 episodes	
1953	The Backbone of America	Ethel	TV film	
1953	I Married Joan	Miss Everett	Broken Toe	
1953	I Married Joan	Mrs. Murdock	Uncredited, Neighbors	
1953	The Abbott and Costello Show	Grocery Store Customer	Hillary's Birthday	
1953	Mr. and Mrs. North	Maggie McGinness	The Man Who Came to Murder	
1953	General Electric Theater		Hired Mother	
1953–1955	Topper	Henrietta Topper	Recurring role, run of the series	
1955	Kings Row	Mrs. Johnson	Mail Order Bride	
1957	Matinee Theatre		Aesop and Rhodope	
1957	The Lineup	Julia Wyatt	The Honolulu Treasure Case	
1957	Those Whiting Girls	Dolly	What Price Publicity?	
1957	The 20th Century-Fox Hour	Emmie Wasey	The Marriage Broker	
1957	Mr. Adams and Eve	Connie Drake	That Magazine	
1957	Mr. Adams and Eve	Connie Drake	The Mothers	
1957	Mr. Adams and Eve	Connie Drake	This Is Your Life	
1957	Circus Boy	Minerva Murdock	Counterfeit Clown	
1957	The Adventures of Hiram Holliday	Mrs. Primrose	Hiram's Holiday	
1958	The Thin Man	Eva Clark	Jittery Juror	
1959	Hawaiian Eye	Pearl Blake	Second Day of Infamy	
1959	Wagon Train	Mrs. Elliot Swinbourne Steele	The Steele Family Story	
1959	Lawman	The Chef	Mary Young	
1960	Lawman	Bess Harper	The Old War Horse	
1960	The Untouchables	Lelah Dolan	Jack 'Legs' Diamond	
1960	The Chevy Mystery Show	Mrs. Endicott	The Machine Calls It Murder	
1960	The Dennis O'Keefe Show	Aunt Millie	Go Home Aunt Millie	
1961	Pete and Gladys	Phoebe	Lover Go Away	
1961	77 Sunset Strip	Nona Rumson	Strange Bedfellows	
1961	Harrigan and Son	Alice Finley	Shall We Dance?	
1961	The Real McCoys	Clarissa Webster	George's Housekeeper	
1961–1962	The Alvin Show	Mrs. Frumpington	Squares	
1962	The Rifleman	Mrs. Leota Carreway	Guilty Conscience	
1962	Follow the Sun	Phyllis Curran	Run, Clown, Run	
1962	Follow the Sun	Lila	Chicago Style	
1962	Adventures in Paradise	Millicent	The Baby Sitters	
1963	The Real McCoys	Aunt Wilma	Skeleton in the Closet	
1964	The Farmer's Daughter	Geraldine Addison	Scandal in Washington	
1964	Summer Playhouse	Miss Birch	August 29, 1964 episode	
1965	The Donna Reed Show	Maudie Baker	The Gladiators	
1965	Hazel	Cora	Noblesse Oblige	
1965	Hazel	Mrs. Durham	It's a Dog's Life	

== Citations ==
=== References ===
- Asker, Everett (2013). George Raft The Films. McFarland. ISBN 978-0-7864-6646-7.
- Bleiler, David (2003). TLA Video & DVD Guide 2004: The Discerning Film Lover's Guide. St. Martin's Griffin. ISBN 978-0-312-31686-0.
- Brooks, Tim; Marsh, Earle F. (1995). The Complete Directory to Prime Time Network and Cable TV Shows, 1946–Present. Ballantine Books. ISBN 978-0-307-48320-1.
- Bubbeo, Daniel (2002). The Women of Warner Brothers: The Lives and Careers of 15 Leading Ladies, with Filmographies for Each. McFarland. ISBN 978-0-7864-6236-0.
- Darby, William (2009). Anthony Mann The Film Career. McFarland. ISBN 978-0-7864-3839-6.
- Dick, Bernard (2011). Hollywood Madonna: Loretta Young. University Press of Mississippi. ISBN 978-1-61703-079-6.
- Fleming, E. J. (2009). Paul Bern. McFarland. ISBN 978-0-7864-3963-8.
- Gates, Phillippa (2011). Detecting Women Gender and the Hollywood Detective Film. SUNY Press. ISBN 978-1-4384-3405-6.
- Hischak, Thomas S. (2009). Broadway Plays and Musicals: Descriptions and Essential Facts of More Than 14,000 Shows Through 2007. McFarland. ISBN 978-0-7864-5309-2.
- Hischak, Thomas S. (2012). American Literature on Stage and Screen 525 Works and Their Adaptations. McFarland. ISBN 978-0-7864-6842-3.
- Leszczak, Bob (2012). Single Season Sitcoms, 1948–1979: A Complete Guide. McFarland. ISBN 978-0-7864-6812-6.
- Maltin, Leonard (2008). Leonard Maltin's 2009 Movie Guide. Plume. ISBN 978-0-452-28978-9.
- Nissan, Axel (2006). Actresses of a Certain Character: Forty Familiar Hollywood Faces from the Thirties to the Fifties. McFarland & Company, Inc. ISBN 978-0-7864-2746-8.
- Pitts, Michael R. (2013). Western Movies. McFarland. ISBN 978-0-7864-6372-5.
- Rich, John (2006). Warm Up the Snake: A Hollywood Memoir. University of Michigan Press. ISBN 978-0-472-11578-5.
- Roberts, Jerry (2003). The Great American Playwrights on the Screen: A Critical Guide to Film, TV, Video and DVD. Applause Theatre & Cinema Books. ISBN 978-1-55783-512-3.
- Romano, Frederick V. (2004). The Boxing Filmography American Features, 1920–2003. McFarland. ISBN 978-1-4766-1058-0.
- Sherman, Vincent (1996). Studio Affairs: My Life as a Film Director. The University Press of Kentucky. ISBN 978-0-8131-1975-5.
- Terrace, Vincent (2013). Television Specials 5,336 Entertainment Programs, 1936–2012, 2d ed. McFarland. ISBN 978-0-7864-7444-8.
- Troyan, Michael (2010). A Rose for Mrs. Miniver: The Life of Greer Garson. The University Press of Kentucky. ISBN 978-0-8131-2094-2.
- Tucker, David C. (2008). Shirley Booth: A Biography and Career Record. McFarland. ISBN 978-0-7864-3600-2.
- Tucker, David C. (2010). Lost Laughs of '50s and '60s Television: Thirty Sitcoms That Faded Off Screen. McFarland. ISBN 978-0-7864-5582-9.
- Verswijver, Leo (2003). "Movies Were Always Magical" Interviews with 19 Actors, Directors, and Producers from the Hollywood of the 1930s through the 1950s. McFarland. ISBN 978-0-7864-1129-0.
