= Mayor of the Town =

Mayor of the Town either refers to:

- Mayor of the Town (radio program), a comedy–drama radio show
- Mayor of the Town (TV series), a television series based on the aforementioned radio program
