= Little Accident (film) =

- Theatrical release poster
- Directed by: Charles Lamont
- Screenplay by: Paul Yawitz; Eve Greene
- Based on: Little Accident by: Floyd Dell; Thomas Mitchell
- Produced by: Charles Lamont
- Starring: Hugh Herbert; Florence Rice; Richard Carlson; Ernest Truex; Joy Hodges; Kathleen Howard; Howard Hickman; Edgar Kennedy; Etienne Girardot; Fritz Feld
- Cinematography: Milton Krasner
- Edited by: Frank Gross
- Production company: Universal Pictures
- Distributed by: Universal Pictures
- Release date: October 27, 1939
- Running time: 65 minutes
- Country: United States
- Language: English

Little Accident is a 1939 American comedy film directed by Charles Lamont and written by Paul Yawitz and Eve Greene. It is very loosely based on the 1928 play Little Accident by Floyd Dell and Thomas Mitchell, mostly retaining just its title. The film stars Hugh Herbert, Florence Rice, Richard Carlson, Ernest Truex, Joy Hodges, Kathleen Howard, Howard Hickman, Edgar Kennedy, Etienne Girardot and Fritz Feld. The film was released on October 27, 1939, by Universal Pictures.

== Plot ==
On the day before his second wedding, a man finds out that his bride-to-be has had a baby.

== Cast ==
- Hugh Herbert as Herbert Pearson
- Florence Rice as Alice Pearson
- Richard Carlson as Perry Allerton
- Ernest Truex as Tabby Morgan
- Joy Hodges as Joan Huston
- Kathleen Howard as Mrs. Allerton
- Howard Hickman as Mr. Allerton
- Edgar Kennedy as Paper Hanger
- Etienne Girardot as Professor Artemus Glenwater
- Fritz Feld as Malisse
- Charles D. Brown as Jeff Collins
- Mary Field as Miss Wilson
- Baby Sandy as Sandy
- Virginia Lee Corbin as Nurse (uncredited)

Peggy Moran made her Universal Studios debut in this film.

== Critical reception ==
Variety wrote that although the movie "displays cute smile and antics of Baby Sandy, combining some elemental and slapstick comedy sequences by Hugh Herbert and adult members of the cast, but all on a rather inconsequential story that serves nothing more than as an excuse for the individual situations and that "as an attraction, Little Accident will suffice as supporter in the family houses, lacking story strength to get attention above that slot."
