= Bertha Mann =

American actress (1893–1967)

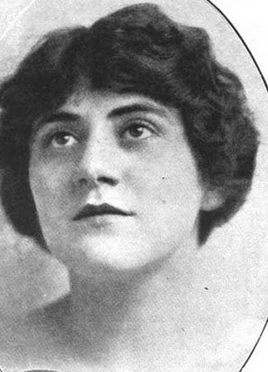
- Mann c.1914
- Born: October 21, 1893; Atlanta, Georgia, U.S.
- Died: December 20, 1967 (aged 74); Los Ángeles, California, U.S.
- Occupation: Actress
- Years active: 1914–1932
- Spouse: Raymond Griffith (m. 1928; died 1957)
- Children: 2

Bertha Mann (October 21, 1893 – December 20, 1967) was an American stage and film actress.

== Early life ==
Mann was born in Atlanta, Georgia. She trained as a dancer in childhood, but soon found that drama was a better fit for her talents.

== Career ==
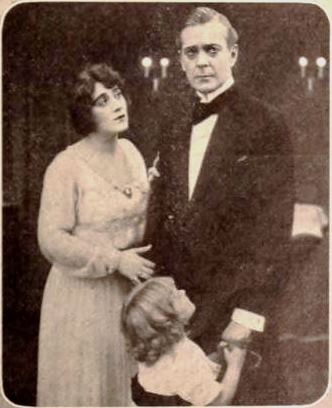
A still from the silent film The Blindness of Divorce (1918), showing Mann, Charles Clary, and Nancy Caswell

Mann started touring with stock companies as a young actress. Broadway appearances by Mann included roles in When Claudia Smiles (1914), When the Young Vine Blooms (1915), The Weavers (1915–1916), One of Us (1918), The Crimson Alibi (1919), The Man with the Load of Mischief (1925), and The Virgin (1926). Films featuring Bertha Mann include The Blindness of Divorce (1918), All Quiet on the Western Front (1930), The Little Accident (1930), Free Love (1930), Caught Cheating (1931), Father's Son (1931), A Woman of Experience (1931), The Final Edition (1932), and Behind the Mask (1932).

During World War I Mann learned to knit to make "mufflers" for American troops, took a basic nursing course, and was active with the Stage Women's War Relief organization. She suggested that the young film industry in Los Angeles might follow the example of the theatre community in New York in supporting the war effort.

== Filmography ==
Year	Title	Role	Notes
1918	The Blindness of Divorce	Claire Langdon	
1930	All Quiet on the Western Front	Sister Libertine	Uncredited
1930	The Little Accident	Miss Hemingway	
1930	Free Love	Helena	
1931	Caught Cheating	Lena Harris	
1931	Father's Son	Mrs. Stewart	
1931	A Woman of Experience	Red Cross Nurse	
1932	The Final Edition	Jane Conroy	
1932	Behind the Mask	Nurse Edwards	(final film role)

== Personal life ==
Mann married fellow actor Raymond Griffith in 1928. They lived in Los Angeles and raised two children together. She was widowed when Griffith died in 1957. She died ten years later, aged 74 years, in Los Angeles.
