= The Backbone of America =

1953 television film by Robert E. Sherwood

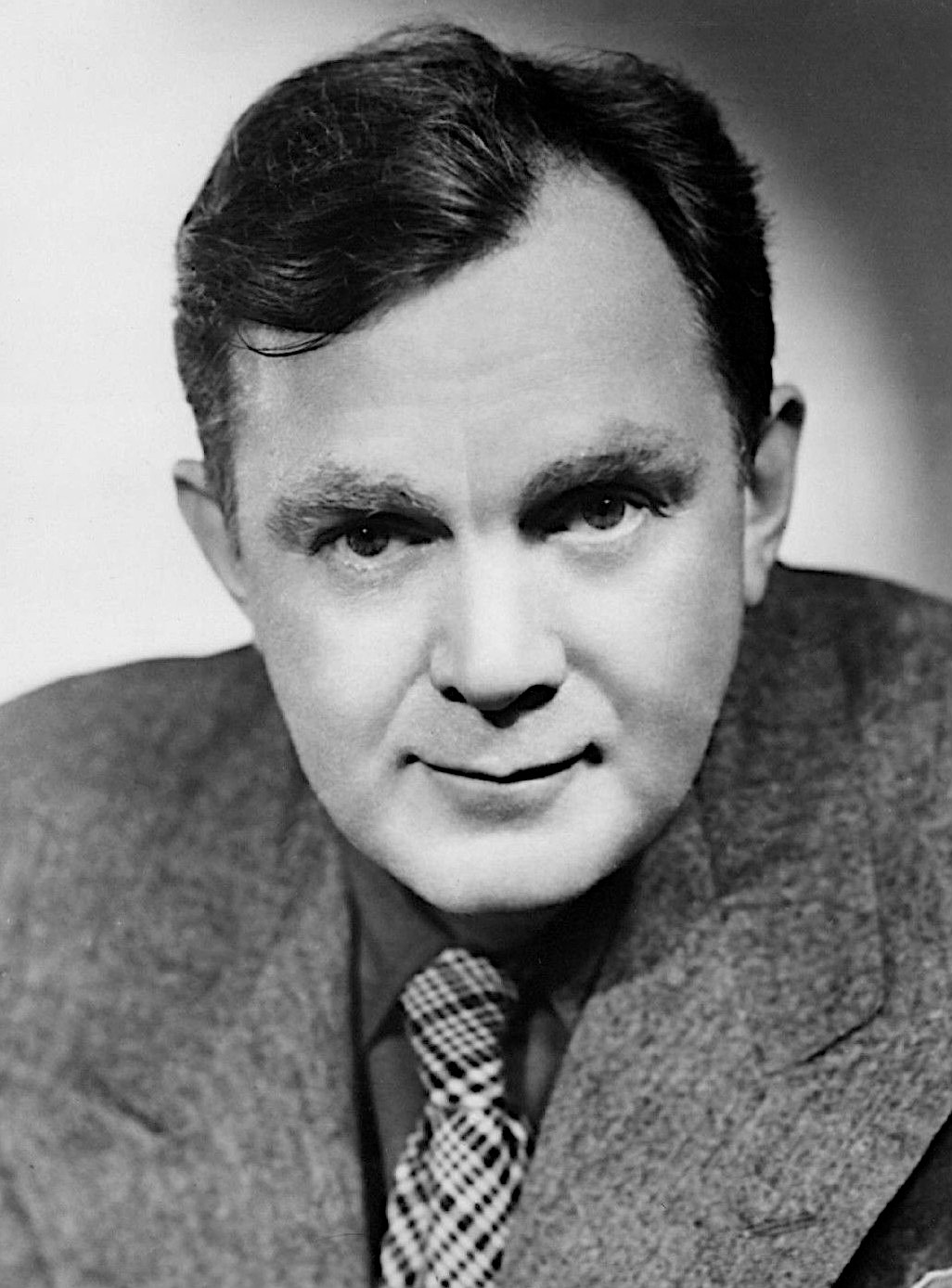
- Thomas Mitchell as Fred Tupple
- Written by: Robert E. Sherwood
- Directed by: Marc Daniels
- Starring: Thomas Mitchell; Wendell Corey; Yvonne de Carlo
- Country of origin: United States
- Original language: English

Production
- Running time: 60 minutes

Original release
- Network: NBC
- Release: December 29, 1953

The Backbone of America is a 1953 American TV movie written by Robert E. Sherwood and directed by Marc Daniels.

== Plot ==
An account executive tries to find the perfect American family to use in a forthcoming advertising campaign.

== Cast ==
- Wendell Corey as Ben Bruce
- Yvonne De Carlo as Victoria Johnson
- Gene Lockhart as Uncle Cedric
- Thomas Mitchell as Fred Tupple
- Sammy Ogg as Wallie
- Lee Patrick as Ethel
- Gloria Talbott as Janet
- Regis Toomey as Bill Carmody

== Production ==
It was the first play Sherwood wrote for television. He did it under a contract with NBC to write nine original plays over three years.

The production was recorded in Hollywood. The cast had two weeks of rehearsals. De Carlo said she was "panicked" to do the show but it ended up well. Alec Guinness had a contract with Alex Korda to make one film a year and he agreed to star.

== Reception ==
The New York Times said the play was "completely disappointing".
