= Free Love (film) =

1930 film

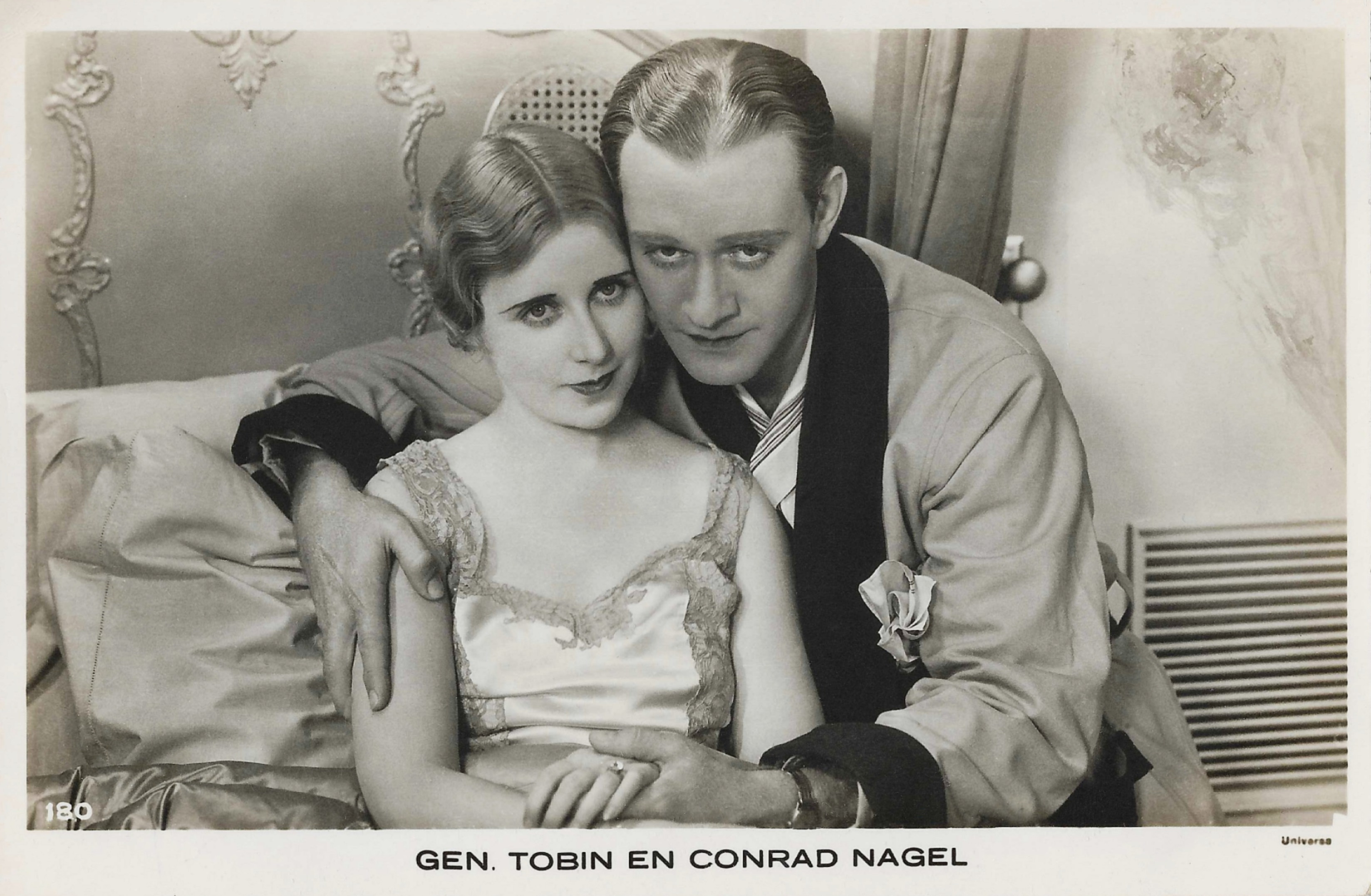
- Still with Tobin and Nagel
- Directed by: Hobart Henley
- Written by: Edwin H. Knopf (adaptation, dialogue); Winifred Dunn (continuity); Erwin S. Gelsey (scenario)
- Produced by: Carl Laemmle Jr.
- Starring: Conrad Nagel; Genevieve Tobin
- Cinematography: Hal Mohr
- Distributed by: Universal Pictures
- Release date: December 1930
- Running time: 70 minutes
- Country: United States
- Language: English

Free Love is a 1930 American Pre-Code comedy film produced and distributed by Universal Pictures, directed by Hobart Henley, and starring Conrad Nagel.

== Plot ==
A wife's psychiatrist tells her that she is being dominated by her husband. Her solution is to divorce him.

== Cast ==
- Genevieve Tobin as Hope Ferrier
- Conrad Nagel as Stephen Ferrier
- Monroe Owsley as Rush Bigelow
- Bertha Mann as Helena
- Ilka Chase as Pauline
- George Irving as Judge Sturgis
- Reginald Pasch as Dr. Wohlheim
- ZaSu Pitts as Ada
- Slim Summerville as Dennis
- Sidney Bracey as Butler

== Preservation status ==
A print of this film is in the collection of the Library of Congress.
