= Miss Pinkerton =

1932 film

- Lantern silde
- Directed by: Lloyd Bacon
- Written by: Niven Busch; Lillie Hayward; Robert Tasker (add. dialogue)
- Based on: Miss Pinkerton: Adventures of a Nurse Detective; 1932 novel by Mary Roberts Rinehart
- Produced by: Hal B. Wallis (uncredited)
- Starring: Joan Blondell; George Brent; Ruth Hall
- Cinematography: Barney McGill
- Edited by: Ray Curtiss
- Music by: Bernhard Kaun
- Production company: First National Pictures
- Distributed by: First National Pictures
- Release date: July 30, 1932
- Running time: 66 minutes
- Country: United States
- Language: English

Miss Pinkerton is a 1932 American pre-Code comedy mystery film about a nurse who becomes involved in a murder investigation. It stars Joan Blondell, George Brent and Ruth Hall. The film is adapted from a book with the same title, by American novelist Mary Roberts Rinehart.

== Plot ==
Elderly Juliet Mitchell suffers shock upon discovering her nephew's lifeless body. It is not clear if the young man, Herbert Wynn, was killed by accident while cleaning his gun or if he committed suicide or was murdered. Miss Adams is called in to serve as nurse for the bedridden Mitchell. Police Inspector Patten thinks Wynn may have been murdered, so he privately asks Miss Adams to watch the household and report back to him. She is hesitant about accepting the job, but the handsome detective persuades her to help and nicknames her "Miss Pinkerton." The odd behavior of Mitchell and her household staff, her doctor, her lawyer, and the late Wynn's girlfriend give Miss Adams plenty to report.

== Cast ==
- Joan Blondell as Nurse Adams aka "Miss Pinkerton"
- George Brent as Police Inspector Patten
- Ruth Hall as Paula Brent
- John Wray as Hugo
- Elizabeth Patterson as Juliet Mitchell
- C. Henry Gordon as Dr. Stuart
- Holmes Herbert as Arthur Glenn
- Mary Doran as Florence Lenz
- Blanche Friderici as Mary
- Allan Lane as Herbert Wynn (scenes deleted)
- Nigel De Brulier as Coroner James A. Clemp (as Nigel de Brulier)
- Eulalie Jensen as Miss Gibbons
- Walter Brennan as Police Dispatcher (uncredited)
- Lyle Talbot as Newspaper Editor (uncredited)

== See also ==
- The Nurse's Secret (1941)
