= The Nurse's Secret =

1941 film by Noel M. Smith

- Directed by: Noel M. Smith
- Written by: Anthony Coldeway
- Based on: Miss Pinkerton by Mary Roberts Rinehart
- Produced by: Bryan Foy; William Jacobs
- Starring: Lee Patrick; Regis Toomey; Julie Bishop
- Cinematography: James Van Trees
- Edited by: Doug Gould
- Music by: William Lava
- Production company: Warner Bros. Pictures
- Distributed by: Warner Bros. Pictures
- Release date: May 24, 1941
- Running time: 64 minutes
- Country: United States
- Language: English

The Nurse's Secret is a 1941 American murder mystery film directed by Noel M. Smith and starring Lee Patrick as a crime-solving nurse. The supporting cast features Regis Toomey and Julie Bishop. It was produced and distributed by Warner Bros. Pictures as a second feature.

The film, which includes a rare leading role for Patrick who played the supporting part of Sam Spade's secretary in The Maltese Falcon that same year, is a remake of the film Miss Pinkerton and is based on the 1932 novel Miss Pinkerton by Mary Roberts Rinehart. Rinehart wrote a series of novels based on the character Hilda Adams. She is, however, most famous for her play The Bat which inspired Batman creator Bob Kane to create his famous comic book character.

== Plot ==
A nurse (Lee Patrick) moves into a mansion after an apparent suicide to care for the old mother. The mother is kind of spooky, but so is the butler, and the girlfriend, and the doctor. After the insurance policy is found, the plot thickens.

== Cast ==
- Lee Patrick as Ruth Adams
- Regis Toomey as Inspector Patton
- Julie Bishop as Florence Lentz
- Ann Edmonds as Paula Brent
- George Campeau as Charles Elliott
- Clara Blandick as Miss Juliet Mitchell
- Charles Waldron as Dr. Stewart
- Charles Trowbridge as Arthur Glenn
- Leonard Mudie as Hugo
- Virginia Brissac as Mary
- Frank Reicher as Mr. Henderson
- Georgia Caine as Miss Griffin
- Douglas Kennedy as Dr. Keene
- Faye Emerson as Telephone Girl
- Lucia Carroll as Nurse
- Frank Mayo as Policeman
- Jack Mower as Policeman

== See also ==
- Miss Pinkerton (1932)

== Bibliography ==
- Fetrow, Alan G. Feature Films, 1940-1949: a United States Filmography. McFarland, 1994.
- Goble, Alan. The Complete Index to Literary Sources in Film. Walter de Gruyter, 1999.
