= All of Me (1934 film) =

1934 drama film by James Flood

- Directed by: James Flood
- Written by: Thomas Mitchell; Sidney Buchman
- Based on: Parfumerie; 1932 play by Rose Porter
- Produced by: Louis D. Lighton
- Starring: Fredric March; Miriam Hopkins; George Raft
- Cinematography: Victor Milner
- Edited by: Otho Lovering
- Music by: Karl Hajos
- Production company: Paramount Pictures
- Distributed by: Paramount Pictures
- Release date: February 1, 1934
- Running time: 70 minutes
- Country: United States
- Language: English

All of Me is a 1934 American pre-Code drama film directed by James Flood and starring Fredric March, Miriam Hopkins, and George Raft. The film was written by actor Thomas Mitchell and Sidney Buchman from Rose Porter's play Chrysalis.

== Plot ==
A professor tires of the direction his life is going and wants to move west, but his girlfriend doesn't understand why he is so dissatisfied.

== Cast ==
- Fredric March as Don Ellis
- Miriam Hopkins as Lydia Darrow
- George Raft as Honey Rogers
- Helen Mack as Eve Haron
- Nella Walker as Mrs. Darrow
- William Collier, Sr. as Jerry Helman
- Gilbert Emery as Dean
- Blanche Friderici as Miss Haskell
- Edgar Kennedy as Guard
- Jason Robards, Sr. as Man in Speakeasy
- Barton MacLane as First Cop
- Kitty Kelly as Lorraine
- Dennis O'Keefe as Policeman (uncredited)
- Guy Usher as District Attorney (uncredited)

== Production ==
The film was based on a play by Rose Porter called Chrysalis. It debuted in summer theatre in 1932.

In April 1933 Paramount announced the cast would include Raft, March and Hopkins. The following month Sylvia Sidney joined the cast and the movie was going to be called Desire.

Raft was fighting with Paramount and for a while it seemed he may leave the studio but in June they confirmed he would make the film after The Bowery.

Carole Lombard replaced Sidney. Then she dropped out and was replaced by Helen Mack.

Filming took place in October and November 1933 under the title Chrysalis.

== Reception ==
Reviews were poor and the film was a box office flop.

The Los Angeles Times said it had "an almost hopeless plot." Filmink magazine said "a contemporary critic wondered if the reels had been accidentally swapped around and it feels like that when you watch the movie today."
