= The O. Henry Playhouse =

- Series title sequence
- Genre: Anthology
- Written by: Irving H. Cooper; Donald Hyde; George Waggner; Albert Isaac Bezzerides; Mary McCarthy; Al C. Ward; Dale Wasserman
- Directed by: George Waggner; Bernard Girard; Frederick Stephani; Felix Feist; Peter Godfrey; Anton M. Leader; Leslie Goodwins; Marshall Grant; Kenneth G. Crane
- Starring: Thomas Mitchell
- Country of origin: United States
- Original language: English
- No. of seasons: 1
- No. of episodes: 39

Production
- Executive producers: Jack J. Gross; Philip N. Krasne
- Producer: Donald Hyde
- Cinematography: Hal McAlpin
- Editors: Kenneth G. Crane; Asa Boyd Clark
- Running time: 30 min.
- Production company: Gross-Krasne Productions

Original release
- Network: Syndication
- Release: 1956 – 1957

The O. Henry Playhouse was an early American anthology television series which featured television adaptations of short stories written by 19th-century author O. Henry and primarily set in New York City. The series was both hosted and narrated by Thomas Mitchell, who portrayed the title character, and featured several television and film stars during its run such as Maureen Stapleton, Charles Bronson, DeForest Kelley, Ernest Borgnine, Tom Conway, Stanley Clements, Otto Kruger, Dave O'Brien, Jane Nigh, Louis Hayward, Marsha Hunt, John Carradine, and Richard Arlen.

The syndicated series began running in 23 regional markets in late 1956. When General Cigar Company of Baltimore signed on as a sponsor in May 1957, the series was contracted to 188 markets. The O. Henry Playhouse generally received very good ratings and became one of the top 10 filmed series in some markets, ranking as high as #6 in Atlanta and #2 in Los Angeles and Minneapolis-St. Paul.

The O. Henry Playhouse became popular among educators. Tom Gibbons, who owned WAFB-TV in Baton Rouge, Louisiana, asked Gross-Krasne if film prints of the series could be shown to high school English classes. Gross-Krasne worked out a more practical plan where students were instructed to watch the program on WAFB and discuss the program the following day. Thomas Mitchell himself made a personal appearance in Baton Rouge, to speak before the students. Mitchell's interactions with the students were so stimulating that Gross-Krasne arranged for the actor to tour other schools nationwide.

== Home media ==
Unseen for decades and largely forgotten, The O. Henry Playhouse received a DVD release in 2021. Video distributor Classic Flix restored the 39 episodes of the series and released them in 2021.

The website for the DVD release features plot summaries of each episode, along with links to online texts of the original stories so viewers can compare O. Henry's writings and the television adaptations. The site also includes cast and crew information for each episode and a video sample from the episode. The overall description of the series recounts its unusual story telling method:

Veteran character actor Thomas Mitchell stars in each episode as writer O. Henry himself as he relates his stories to his publisher, his barber, a bartender, or the cop on the beat. In some episodes, O. Henry meets his characters as he discovers firsthand the story he will later write. This rather unique storytelling method is made possible by the fame of the author himself and the O. Henry audience's desire to learn where each story came from.

Several years before the DVD release Ron Hall, an entrepreneur specializing in public domain video material, related how he received a large collection of original 16mm prints of the series. He posted a video sample of the "Two Renegades" episode, along with general discussion of the series' history, copyright status, number of episodes, and sometimes unexpected casting.

== Episodes ==
No.	Title	Written by	Original release date	Prod. code	Viewers
1	"The Reformation of Calliope"	George Waggner	23 January 1957	#1.01	N/A
Director: George Waggner
2	"Man About Town"	George Waggner	30 January 1957	#1.02	N/A
Director: George Waggner – Includes plot elements from "An Unfinished Story"
3	"Sam Plunkett's Promise"	Donald Hyde	6 February 1957	#1.03	N/A
Director: Bernard Girard — Based on "The Theory and the Hound"
4	"Two Renegades"	Irving Cooper	13 February 1957	#1.04	N/A
Director: Bernard Girard
5	"The Marionettes"	George Waggner	20 February 1957	#1.05	N/A
Director: Peter Godfrey
6	"Fog In Santone"	George Waggner	27 February 1957	#1.06	N/A
Director: Bernard Girard
7	"Hearts and Hands"	Irving Cooper	6 March 1957	#1.07	N/A
Director: Bernard Girard
8	"Blackjack Bargainer"	Irving Cooper	13 March 1957	#1.08	N/A
Director: Bernard Girard
9	"The World And The Door"	George Waggner	20 March 1957	#1.09	N/A
Director: Peter Godfrey
10	"The Guilty Party"	Irving Cooper	27 March 1957	#1.10	N/A
Director: Bernard Girard
11	"A Ramble In Aphasia"	Irving Cooper	3 April 1957	#1.11	N/A
Director: Bernard Girard
12	"Fourth in Salvador"	George Waggner	10 April 1957	#1.12	N/A
Director: George Waggner
13	"After Twenty Years"	Donald Hyde	17 April 1957	#1.13	N/A
Director: Bernard Girard
14	"A Trick of Nature"	Donald Hyde	24 April 1957	#1.14	N/A
Director: Bernard Girard
15	"Sisters of the Golden Circle"	William Kozlenko (adaptation); Donald Hyde (written for tv)	1 May 1957	#1.15	N/A
Director: Peter Godfrey
16	"Hygeia at the Solito"	Donald Hyde	8 May 1957	#1.16	N/A
Director: Felix E. Feist
17	"Only The Horse Would Know"	Al C. Ward (adaptation); Donald Hyde (written for tv)	15 May 1957	#1.17	N/A
Director: Anton M. Leader
18	"The Atvatism Of Jon Tom Little Bear"	Irving Cooper	22 May 1957	#1.18	N/A
Director: Bernard Girard
19	"Georgia's Ruling"	Mary McCarthy	29 May 1957	#1.19	N/A
Director: Bernard Girard
20	"The Fool Killer"	George Waggner	5 June 1957	#1.20	N/A
Director: Bernard Girard
21	"One Dollar's Worth"	Irving Cooper	12 June 1957	#1.21	N/A
Director: George Waggner
22	"Christmas by Injunction"	Donald Hyde	19 June 1957	#1.22	N/A
Director: Felix Feist
23	"The Roads We Take"	Irving Cooper	26 June 1957	#1.23	N/A
Director: George Waggner
24	"Vanity And Some Sables"	George Waggner	3 July 1957	#1.24	N/A
Director: Peter Godfrey
25	"The Sphinx Apple"	Irving Cooper	10 July 1957	#1.25	N/A
Director: Leslie Goodwins
26	"Wit's End"	Seymour Roth (adaptation); Donald Hyde (written for tv)	17 July 1957	#1.26	N/A
Director: Anton M. Leader
27	"Girl"	Albert Isaac Bezzerides	24 July 1957	#1.27	N/A
Director: Peter Godfrey
28	"Hypotheses Of Failure"	Irving Cooper	31 July 1957	#1.28	N/A
Director: George Waggner
29	"Hiding of Black Bill"	Irving Cooper	7 August 1957	#1.29	N/A
Director:George Waggner
30	"Between Rounds"	George Waggner	14 August 1957	#1.30	N/A
Director: George Waggner
31	"Two Thanksgiving Day Gentlemen"	Irving Cooper	21 August 1957	#1.31	N/A
Director: Frederick Stephani
32	"The Emancipation of Billy"	Donald Hyde	28 August 1957	#1.32	N/A
Director: Frederick Stephani
33	"A Madison Square Arabian Knight"	Irving Cooper	4 September 1957	#1.33	N/A
Director: Frederick Stephani
34	"The Lonely Man"	Donald Hyde	11 September 1957	#1.34	N/A
Director: Kenneth G. Crane — Based on "The Last of the Troubadours"
35	"The Buyer from Cactus City"	Donald Hyde	18 September 1957	#1.35	N/A
Director: Leslie Goodwins
36	"A Service Of Love"	Mary McCarthy	25 September 1957	#1.36	N/A
Director: Bernard Girard
37	"The Tale Of The Tainted Tenner"	Irving Cooper	2 October 1957	#1.37	N/A
Director: Marshall Grant
38	"The Murderer"	Donald Hyde & Irving Cooper	9 October 1957	#1.38	N/A
Director: Frederick Stephani
39	"The Lotterman Affair"	Donald Hyde & Al C. Ward	16 October 1957	#1.39	N/A
Director: Frederick Stephani
#N/A	"Series One Episode Unproduced (Tobin's Palm)"	George Waggner	#N/A	#N/A	TBD
#N/A	"Series One Episode Unproduced (The Count And The Wedding Guest)"	George Waggner	#N/A	#N/A	TBD
#N/A	"Series One Episode Unproduced (The Gentle Grafter)"	Dale Wasserman	#N/A	#N/A	TBD
