= Behind the Mask (1932 film) =

1932 American horror film

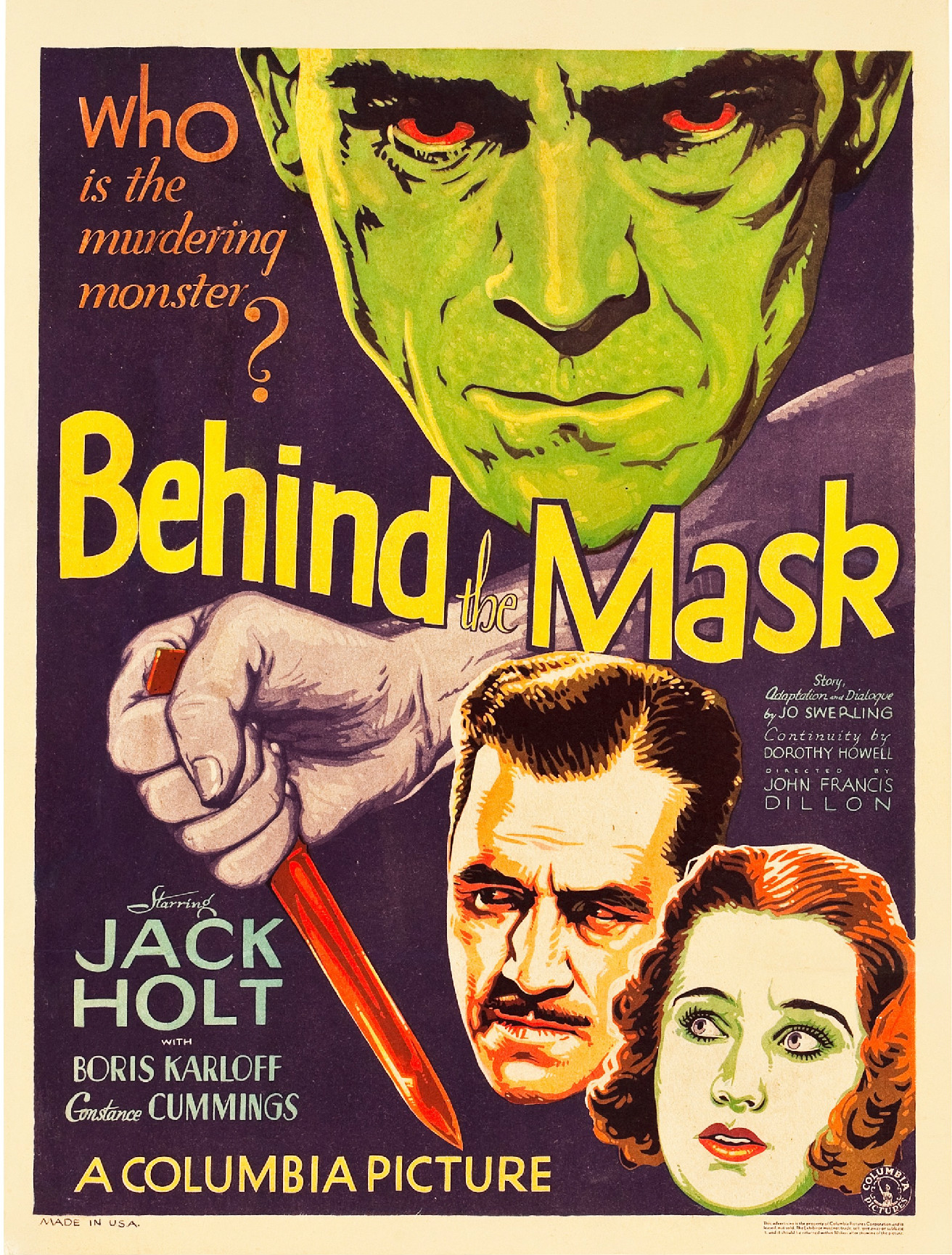
- Theatrical release poster
- Directed by: John Francis Dillon
- Written by: Jo Swerling (story "In the Secret Service"); Jo Swerling (dialogue)
- Starring: Jack Holt
- Cinematography: Ted Tetzlaff (as Teddy Tetzlaff)
- Edited by: Otis Garrett
- Color process: Black and white
- Production company: Columbia Pictures
- Distributed by: Columbia Pictures
- Release date: February 25, 1932
- Running time: 69 minutes
- Country: United States
- Language: English

Behind the Mask is a 1932 American pre-Code horror film directed by John Francis Dillon and starring Jack Holt, Boris Karloff and Edward Van Sloan.

== Plot ==
A federal agent goes undercover to infiltrate a drug smuggling operation headed by a mysterious Mr. X, a criminal mastermind whose identity is unknown even to his henchmen. Mr. X is also running a bogus hospital where victims are killed on the operating table, and their coffins stuffed with narcotics. The drug-filled coffins are then buried in a cemetery.

== Cast ==
- Jack Holt as Jack Hart aka Quinn
- Constance Cummings as Julie Arnold
- Boris Karloff as Jim Henderson
- Claude King as Arnold
- Bertha Mann as Nurse Edwards
- Edward Van Sloan as Dr. August Steiner / Dr. Alec Munsell / Mr. X
- Willard Robertson as Capt. E.J. Hawkes
- Thomas E. Jackson as Agent Burke (as Tommy Jackson)

== See also ==
- List of American films of 1932
