= Moontide =

1942 film by Fritz Lang, Archie Mayo

- Theatrical release poster
- Directed by: Archie Mayo
- Screenplay by: John O'Hara
- Based on: Moon Tide by Willard Robertson
- Produced by: Mark Hellinger
- Starring: Jean Gabin; Ida Lupino; Thomas Mitchell; Claude Rains
- Cinematography: Charles G. Clarke
- Edited by: William Reynolds
- Music by: Cyril J. Mockridge; David Buttolph
- Color process: Black and white
- Production company: 20th Century Fox
- Distributed by: 20th Century Fox
- Release dates: April 29, 1942 (New York City); May 29, 1942 (United States)
- Running time: 95 minutes
- Country: United States
- Language: English

Moontide is a 1942 American romantic drama film with elements of a thriller. It was produced by Mark Hellinger and directed by Archie Mayo, who took over direction after the initial director Fritz Lang left the project early in the shooting schedule. The screenplay was written by John O'Hara and Nunnally Johnson (uncredited), based on the 1940 novel Moon Tide by Willard Robertson. The film features French star Jean Gabin, Ida Lupino, Thomas Mitchell and Claude Rains.

Charles G. Clarke was nominated for an Academy Award for Best Cinematography for black-and-white. Despite charismatic performances by its leads, the film was not well received on release.

== Plot ==
After blacking out from an all-night drinking binge, dock worker Bobo wakes up in a decrepit shack on a San Pablo Bay barge. The barge's owner, fisherman Takeo, reminds him how they met the previous night and that he agreed to work for Takeo. Bobo does not remember the encounter and intends to leave. A police boat passes, and hearing that the police are searching for the murderer of local bar-fly Pop Kelly, who was strangled to death sometime during Bobo's drinking spree, causes Bobo to put the brakes on his plans to go. He is afraid he may have killed the man due to drunken violence he has been capable of in the past.

He takes the job on the barge, then goes into town to meet his friends Tiny and Nutsy, the town watchman and amateur philosopher, at a local boardinghouse. Despite Tiny's assurances that he didn't hurt anyone, Bobo worries. He agrees to meet Tiny later that night and leave town together. As he and Nutsy talk after Tiny leaves, Nutsy realizes Bobo is in possession of Pop Kelly's hat.

As the two men walk near the water, a female group begins to shout about a young woman who is about to drown herself in the surf. Bobo rescues her and takes her back to the barge. The next morning, the young woman, Anna, has rebounded and tidies up the shack while Bobo repairs the boat of Frank Brothers, a wealthy doctor, and his mistress. Anna makes breakfast for Bobo. Tiny shows up and badmouths Anna, "she used to work in a hash house," implying she's a prostitute. Tiny argues for Bobo to finally leave town with him as they had agreed. Anna overhears and tells Bobo she is "much obliged for everything" but she is "blowing now", planning to go back to her life and make her way.

Bobo appears to have fallen for Anna. After she is gone, Tiny hints broadly at what damage he might be able to do to Bobo, regarding his history of aggression. Bobo loses his temper and nearly strangles Tiny, but catches himself and tells him to get out and never come back.

Nutsy stops by that night and finds Bobo having decided to leave town alone. While they are chatting, Nutsy acting as a voice of reason and encouraging Bobo to accept that he may have reached a point where he wants a home, Anna returns. Unnoticed, Nutsy takes Pop Kelly's hat from the shack and later burns it on the beach. Anna and Bobo obviously are drawn to each other, and she talks about her dream of settling down and creating a home, like the cozy barge across the bay. He grabs his bag and leaves, wishing her "good luck". In town, he tries to spend time with Mildred, a prostitute he met during his drunken melee, but he can't stop thinking about Anna and goes back to the barge.

Bobo and Anna decide to settle down and plan to get married. They buy paint and fabric to fix up the shack. After he heads out with Takeo to catch bait, Tiny again interferes and suggests to Anna that he and "his buddy" have a dark history together. Anna is disturbed by this conversation, and when Bobo comes back, she asks him about Tiny. He explains their relationship and tells her about his regrettable tendency to be violent, especially if he gets drunk.

Bobo and Anna get married on the barge with all their friends in attendance. Dr. Brothers sails by during the wedding and asks Bobo to again help him fix his boat. With Anna's blessing, Bobo agrees, and they set off. His happily married state encourages the doctor to leave his mistress and return to his wife. On the barge, Anna opens a gift from Bobo — a gaudy revealing dress, once owned by Mildred. Nutsy assures her that wives should leave modesty out of married life and Anna dons the dress, anticipating Bobo's return.

After Nutsy leaves Anna, Tiny comes to the barge, drunk and angry that he wasn't invited to the wedding. Tiny and Anna argue, and she realizes that Tiny killed Pop Kelly. Enraged, Tiny attacks Anna. When Bobo returns, he and the doctor find Anna stuffed in the bait box, badly injured. They rush her to the hospital, and Dr. Brothers promises to do all he can for her. Leaving Nutsy to wait for word about his wife's condition, Bobo goes hunting for Tiny. He tracks a drunken Tiny to the breakwater near the barge. Bobo stalks him down to the water while Tiny professes his innocence the entire time. Tiny, who cannot swim, climbs onto the rocks to escape, but he is swept away by a wave.

After some time has passed and Anna is able to leave the hospital, Bobo brings her back to the barge via the doctor's boat. She is unable to walk, but he is anxious to at last carry her, as per tradition, across the threshold of their home, which has been spruced up to be as cozy as Anna dreamed it would be. Their favorite song plays as they go inside.

== Cast ==
- Jean Gabin as Bobo
- Ida Lupino as Anna
- Thomas Mitchell as Tiny
- Claude Rains as Nutsy
- Jerome Cowan as Dr. Frank Brothers
- Helene Reynolds as Woman on boat
- Ralph Byrd as Rev. Wilson
- William Halligan as Bartender
- Victor Sen Yung as Takeo (as Sen Yung)
- Chester Gan as Henry Hirota
- Robin Raymond as Mildred
- Arthur Aylesworth as Pop Kelly
- Arthur Hohl as Jennings
- John Kelly as Mac
- Ralph Dunn as Policeman
- Tully Marshall as Mr. Simpson

== Production ==
Moontide was meant to be a star-making vehicle for Gabin, who was celebrated in his home country, but obscure in the United States. The charismatic Gabin had been in a number of successful leading-man roles and had a hand in picking Robertson's story for adaptation to film. Willing to take a chance on him, Twentieth Century Fox bought the rights, despite the novel's themes of prostitution, rape, cannibalism and murder. The Motion Picture Production Code meant the studio had to drop most of the story. In the role of the nefarious Tiny, Mitchell was cast against type, having played Scarlet O'Hara's father in Gone with the Wind.

Soon after shooting began, director Fritz Lang left the project, rumored to be due to friction he had with Gabin regarding Marlene Dietrich, who had been involved with both men. It's not known which early footage is shot by Lang or replacement director Archie Mayo. There were problems regarding the film's location on San Pablo Bay, which had to be scrapped after the attack on Pearl Harbor and the west coast was declared a security zone. A large studio set was filled with water for the barge scenes, giving the film an artificial, dream-like ambiance. The lighting, fog and wave effects, at times dingy and sinister or sparkling and romantic depending on the scene, led to Clarke's Oscar nomination for cinematography.

Surrealist Salvador Dalí was hired to create the drunken montage at the top of the story but his sketches were deemed too bizarre, and the scene was shot with only some of his influence (most likely the close-up of the clock, the headless woman) intact.

== Reception ==
Upon release, the film was not generally well received by critics or audiences, deemed too odd a mix of genres and tones. Gabin was unhappy within the studio system and the pressure to do publicity, and after the war, he resumed working in France exclusively.

Bosley Crowther, film critic for The New York Times, questioned the direction of the film, especially its focus on actor Jean Gabin: "But all of them need much more than a vague and irresolute script, much more than synthetic scenery and manufactured moods. Director Archie Mayo hasn't brought them into contact with real life. He has expended most of his energy in bringing the audience into contact with Mr. Gabin. And Moontide is too heavy a burden to be carried entirely by him, even though he is Charles Boyer from the other side of the railroad tracks."

In 2013, Dave Kehr (also of the Times) wrote that Moontide "provides an illuminating link to one of the frequently overlooked sources of noir: the movement known as 'poetic realism', which flourished in France from the mid-1930s until the onslaught of war...a rootless, hard-drinking French sailor, Bobo (Gabin), achieves a tentative domesticity operating a bait shack with Anna (Ida Lupino), a waif he has rescued from a suicide attempt. The story is so much in the foggy, claustrophobic, doom-laden spirit of poetic realism that at times it seems almost a parody of it. Fate is present in the form of Tiny (Thomas Mitchell), a blackmailer with knowledge of a murder that Bobo might have committed. A kindlier metaphysical force is represented by Claude Rains, playing a waterfront philosopher with the unfortunate name Nutsy."

When the DVD was released in 2008, critic David Mermelstein, writing for Variety, wrote "A twisted romance set among waterfront lowlifes, the b&w pic resonated with neither critics nor auds, though as this DVD debut makes clear, there seems every reason to hope cineastes may now embrace it for what is always was: a keenly observed, highly atmospheric film distinguished by several superb performances and a captivating, if quotidian, mise-en-scene. Solid extras like a full commentary track and meaty 'making-of' featurette should only help raise its standing."

== Accolades ==
- Nominated: Academy Award for Best Cinematography, Black-and-White, Charles G. Clarke; 1943.
