= Father's Son (1941 film) =

1941 film

- Directed by: D. Ross Lederman
- Screenplay by: Fred Niblo Jr. Booth Tarkington
- Based on: Father's Son (1931 film) by Booth Tarkington
- Produced by: Bryan Foy
- Starring: John Litel; Frieda Inescort; Billy Dawson; Christian Rub
- Cinematography: Allen G. Siegler
- Edited by: Frank Magee
- Music by: Howard Jackson
- Production company: Warner Bros. Pictures
- Distributed by: Warner Bros. Pictures
- Release date: February 12, 1941
- Running time: 57 minutes
- Country: United States
- Language: English

Father's Son is a 1941 American drama film directed by D. Ross Lederman and written by Fred Niblo Jr. and Booth Tarkington. The film stars John Litel, Frieda Inescort, Billy Dawson and Christian Rub. It was released by Warner Bros. Pictures on February 12, 1941.

== Plot ==
Wealthy lawyer William "Will" Emory and his wife Ruth have a young son, Billy, whom they rear differently. Will is stricter with Billy, even prohibiting him from associating with children from less fortunate families. Following an incident in which Billy and a friend discharge a loaded gun, Billy flees his home, upset with Will. He is accosted by two men but rescued by local fisherman Lunk Nelson. Lunk returns Billy to his home, but the parenting disagreement between the Emorys forces Ruth to separate from Will, taking Billy with her.

Billy helps Lunk with his fishing business and the two become close friends. Billy tries to persuade his mother to reconcile with his father, but she rebuffs him. Ruth finds a note informing her that Billy has been kidnapped. She and Will go to Lunk's cabin, where they believe Billy is being held. Lunk denies involvement and believes that the two men from whom he had rescued Billy may be responsible. Lunk sets a trap but snags Billy, who confesses to having written the note in order to reunite his parents. Ruth is livid and grabs Billy to enforce even stricter discipline than Will had, much to Will's surprise.

== Cast ==
- John Litel as William Emory
- Frieda Inescort as Ruth Emory
- Billy Dawson as Bill Emory
- Christian Rub as Lunk Nelson

== Reception ==
In a contemporary review for The New York Times, critic Theodore Strauss wrote: "Even if it is based on a story by Booth Tarkington—hard to believe, but true—it is still one of the feeblest parables to which this corner has been subjected in this or any other season. Papa is a pompous dope. Billy is a screeching brat and mama is all sweetness and light, but they're all equally tiresome. Like father, like son, like movie. Take it away, Oedipus!"
