= Mayor of the Town (TV series) =

- Genre: Sitcom
- Created by: Jean Holloway
- Written by: Jean Holloway
- Directed by: John Rawlins
- Starring: Thomas Mitchell; Kathleen Freeman; Jean Byron; Tudor Owen; David Saber
- No. of seasons: 1
- No. of episodes: 39

Production
- Executive producers: Jack J. Gross; Philip N. Krasne
- Producer: John Rawlins
- Running time: 30 minutes
- Production company: Gross-Krasne Productions

Original release
- Network: First-run syndication

Mayor of the Town is a syndicated American sitcom that aired in 1954.

== Premise ==
Mayor of the Town was based on the radio series of the same name, which ran from 1942 until 1949. In 1954, writer Jean Holloway created a televised version of the radio program. The series, also titled Mayor of the Town, premiered in November 1954.

The series took place in the fictional small American town of Springdale. The series mainly focuses around the mayoral and personal life of Mayor Thomas Russell, (played by Thomas Mitchell). The series co-starred Kathleen Freeman as Mayor Russell's housekeeper, Marilly, and his ward, Butch, was played by David Saber.

== Background ==
Planning for the program began in 1951, calling for Lionel Barrymore to reprise his radio role as the title character. However, production did not begin until 1954, when Barrymore's health prevented him from acting. Mitchell was selected to take Barrymore's place.

== Cast ==
- Thomas Mitchell as Mayor Thomas Russell
- Kathleen Freeman as Marilly
- Jean Byron as Minnie
- Tudor Owen as Joe Ainsley
- David Saber as Butch

== Production and distribution ==
Rawlins-Grant Productions and Gross-Krasne Films produced the series. UTP was the initial distributor, followed by MCA. All 39 episodes of the series were broadcast in first-run syndication before generally ending in 1955. The Los Angeles market was an exception, as broadcasting of the series there began in 1956 with sponsorship by Richfield Oil. The series was filmed in black-and-white with no laugh track.

John Rawlins and Marshall Grant were the producers and directors; Erna Lazarus was one of the writers.
