= Abide with Me (play) =

Play written by Clare Boothe Luce

Abide with Me is a 1935 play by American playwright Clare Boothe Luce. Other main production staff include stager John Hayden and scenic designer P. Dodd Ackerman. The play ran a total of 36 times, from 21 November to December of that same year.
