= Jack J. Gross =

American film producer

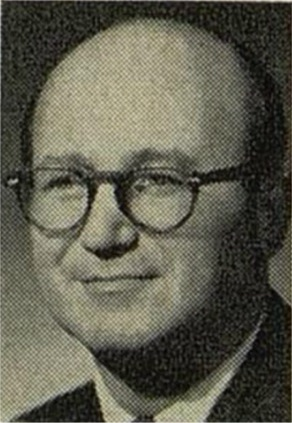
- Born: July 29, 1902; New York City
- Died: March 12, 1964 (aged 61); London, England
- Other name: Jacob Jerome Gross
- Occupations: motion picture and television producer
- Spouse: Hilda Ruth Gross (m 1929-1964, his death)

Jack J. Gross (July 29, 1902 - March 12, 1964) was a motion picture and television producer.

== Early years ==
Jack Gross was the son of George and Pauline Gross, Jewish immigrants from Hungary and Romania, respectively. The oldest of three brothers, Jack Gross began working as an usher after school in New York City, as a projectionist in St. Joseph, Missouri, and as a theater manager in South Bend, Indiana, Eldorado, Kansas, Minneapolis, San Francisco, and Los Angeles, before being appointed western division manager of RKO Theaters.

== Producer ==
In 1939, Gross became a producer at Universal Pictures, remaining there until 1943, when he was appointed executive producer at RKO. Gross joined Philip N. Krasne in 1952 to form Gross-Krasne, Inc, a pioneer American independent producer of television films. They produced, among other programs, the Big Town and Mayor of the Town. Gross-Krasne also acquired the rights to O. Henry's stories and filmed 39 half-hour O. Henry Playhouse television shows. In 1952, Gross-Krasne bought the California Studios (now the Raleigh Studios) where many of their productions were filmed.

== Death ==
In the Connaught Hotel, Gross died suddenly of basilar cerebral thrombosis while on a business trip to London. His remains were cremated and dispersed in the Garden of Rest Cemetery, London.

== Selected filmography ==
- Return of the Bad Men (1948)
