= Father's Son (1931 film) =

1931 film

- Directed by: William Beaudine
- Written by: Walter Anthony
- Based on: Old Fathers and Young Sons by Booth Tarkington
- Produced by: Robert North
- Starring: Leon Janney; Lewis Stone; Irene Rich; John Halliday; Mickey Bennett
- Cinematography: Arthur C. Miller
- Production company: Warner Bros. Pictures
- Distributed by: Warner Bros. Pictures
- Release date: March 7, 1931
- Running time: 76 minutes
- Country: United States
- Language: English

Father's Son is a 1931 American pre-Code melodrama film which was produced by Warner Bros. Pictures in 1930 and released early in 1931. The movie is based on the original film scenario Old Fathers and Young Sons by Booth Tarkington. The film is also known by the name "Boy of Mine."

Leon Janney was being groomed as a child star by Warners, and this film was the one of several he starred in. His career, however, never took off, and in late 1931 he was released from his contract.

== Cast ==
- Leon Janney - Bill Emory
- Lewis Stone - William Emory
- Irene Rich - Ruth Emory
- John Halliday - Dr. Franklin
- Mickey Bennett - Junior Pettis
- Robert Dandridge - Vestibule Pullman Porter
- George H. Reed - Pullman Porter Johnson
- Gertrude Howard - Dinah
- Bertha Mann - Mrs. Stewart
- Grover Ligon - Chauffeur (*Grover Liggon)

== Preservation ==
The film is believed to be a lost film, with no film elements known to exist. The complete soundtrack, however, survives on Vitaphone disks.

== See also ==
- List of lost films
