= Thomas Mitchell (actor) =

American actor and writer (1892–1962)

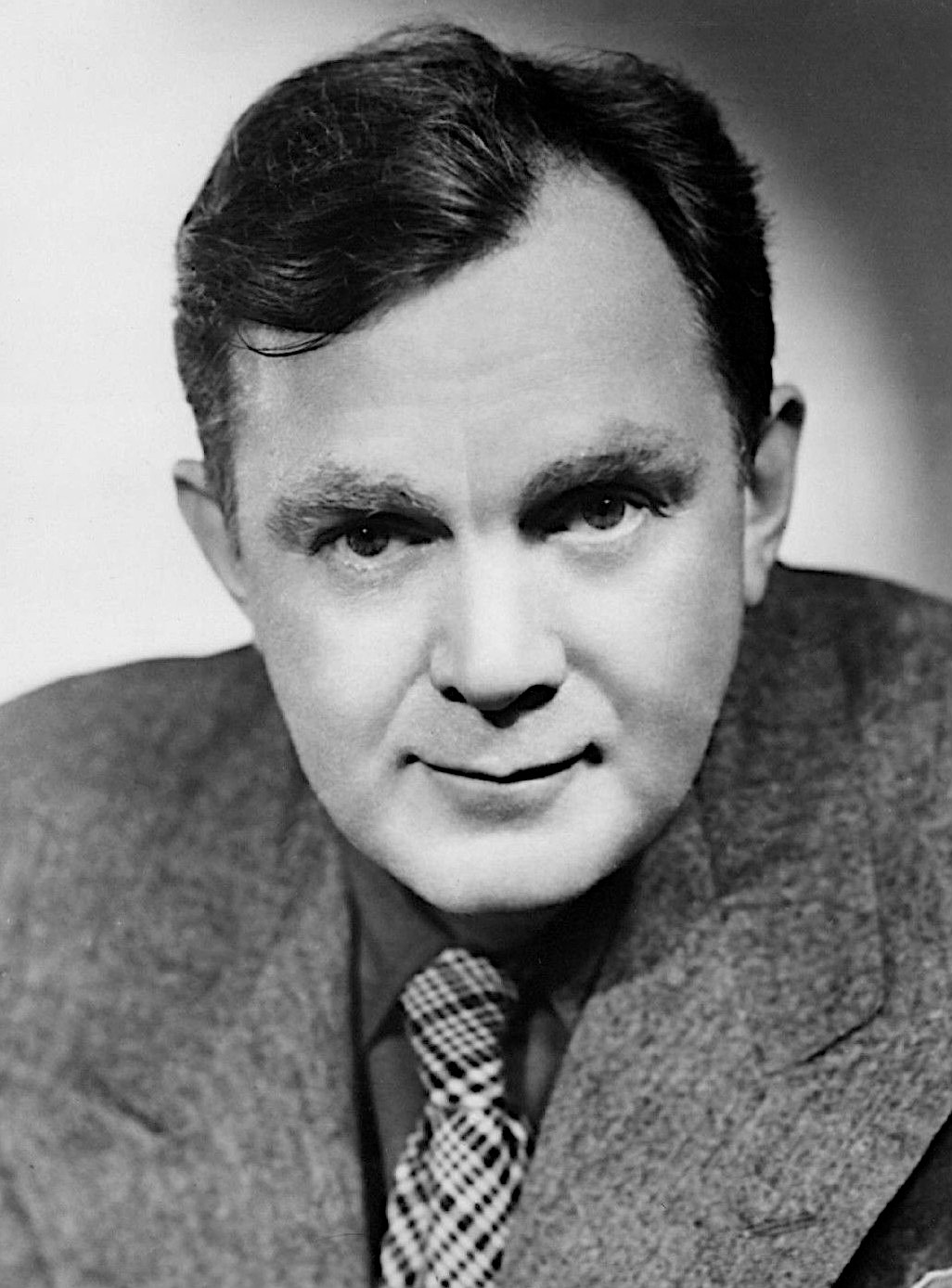
- Thomas Mitchell
- Born: Thomas John Mitchell; July 11, 1892; Elizabeth, New Jersey, U.S.
- Died: December 17, 1962 (aged 70); Beverly Hills, California, U.S.
- Resting place: Chapel of the Pines Crematory
- Occupations: Actor; writer; director
- Years active: 1916–1962
- Spouses: Ann Stuart Breswer (m. 1915; div. 1935) (m. 1941) Rachel Hartzell (m. 1937; div. 1939)
- Relatives: James P. Mitchell (nephew)

Thomas John Mitchell (Irish: Tomás Séan Mistéal; July 11, 1892 – December 17, 1962) was an American character actor, writer, and theater director. He is considered one of the both greatest supporting and character actors of the Golden Age of Hollywood and a leading man on Broadway.

He appeared in over 115 film and television roles between 1923 and 1961, along with numerous stage appearances. Among Mitchell's most famous film roles in a long career are those of Scarlett O'Hara's father Gerald O'Hara in Gone with the Wind, alcoholic Doc Boone in Stagecoach (1939), Pat Garrett in The Outlaw, and Mayor Jonas Henderson in High Noon. He won the Academy Award for Best Supporting Actor for his performance in Stagecoach. He also played Uncle Billy in Frank Capra's Christmas classic It's a Wonderful Life (1946) with James Stewart.

== Achievements ==
Thomas Mitchell was the first male actor to gain the Triple Crown of Acting by winning an Oscar, an Emmy, and a Tony Award. He won an Academy Award for Best Supporting Actor for his performance in Stagecoach, with a previous nomination in the same category for The Hurricane (1937). He was nominated for three Primetime Emmy Awards for Best Actor in a Drama Series: in 1952 and 1953 for his role in the medical drama The Doctor—winning in 1953—and in 1955 for an appearance on a weekly anthology series. He won a Tony Award for Best Actor in a Musical in 1953 for his role as Dr Downer in the musical comedy Hazel Flagg.

== Early life ==
Thomas John Mitchell was born on July 11, 1892, to Irish immigrants, James Mitchell and Mary Donnelly, in Elizabeth, New Jersey. He came from a family of journalists and civic leaders. Both his father and brother were newspaper reporters, and his nephew, James P. Mitchell, later served as Dwight Eisenhower's Secretary of Labor. The younger Mitchell also became a newspaper reporter after graduating from St. Patrick High School in Elizabeth. However, Mitchell soon found that he enjoyed writing theatrical skits much more than chasing scoops. In 1927 Mitchell joined The Lambs.

== Career ==
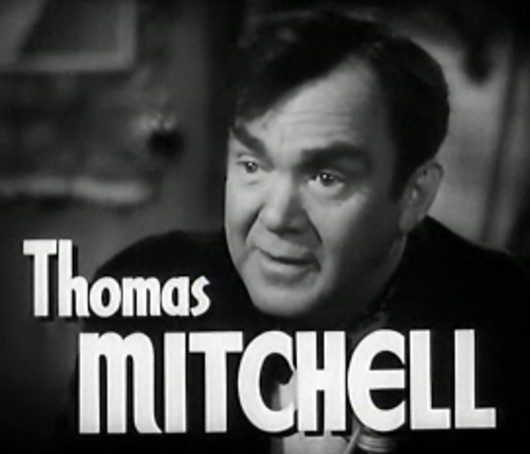
Trailer for High Barbaree (1947)

He became an actor in 1913, at one point touring with Charles Coburn's Shakespeare Company. Even while playing leading roles on Broadway into the 1920s, Mitchell continued to write. One of the plays he co-authored, Little Accident, was eventually made into a film (three times) by Hollywood. Mitchell's first credited screen role was in the 1923 film Six Cylinder Love.

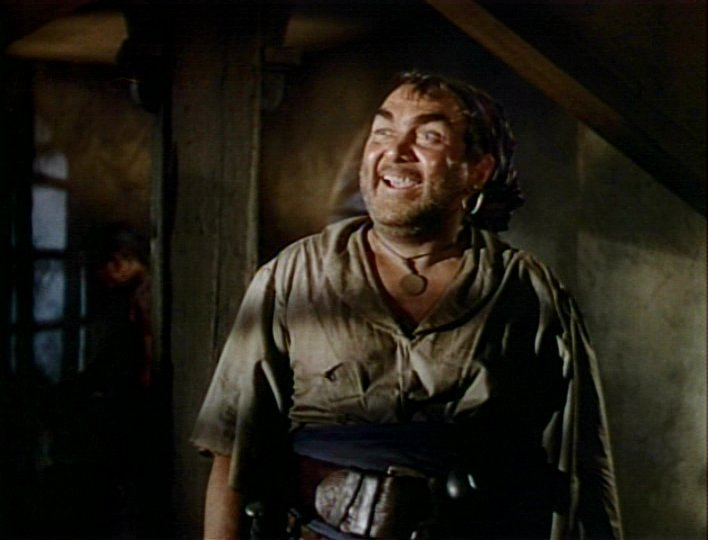
Portraying Tom Blue in The Black Swan (1942)

Mitchell's breakthrough role was as the embezzler in Frank Capra's film Lost Horizon (1937).

Following this performance, he was much in demand in Hollywood. That same year, he was nominated for the Academy Award for Best Supporting Actor for his performance in The Hurricane, directed by John Ford.

Over the next few years, Mitchell appeared in many significant films. Forty-three of the 59 films in which he acted were made in the 10-year period from 1936 to 1946. Considered one of the finest character actors in film, in 1939 alone he had key roles in Stagecoach, Mr. Smith Goes to Washington, Only Angels Have Wings, The Hunchback of Notre Dame, and Gone with the Wind. While probably better remembered as Scarlett O'Hara's loving but doomed father in Gone with the Wind, it was for his performance as the drunken Doc Boone in Stagecoach, co-starring John Wayne (in Wayne's breakthrough role), that Mitchell won the Best Supporting Actor Academy Award. In his acceptance speech, he quipped, "I didn't know I was that good". Throughout the 1940s and 1950s, Mitchell acted in a wide variety of roles in productions such as 1940's Swiss Family Robinson, 1942's Moontide, 1944's The Keys of the Kingdom (as an atheist doctor) and High Noon (1952) as the town mayor.

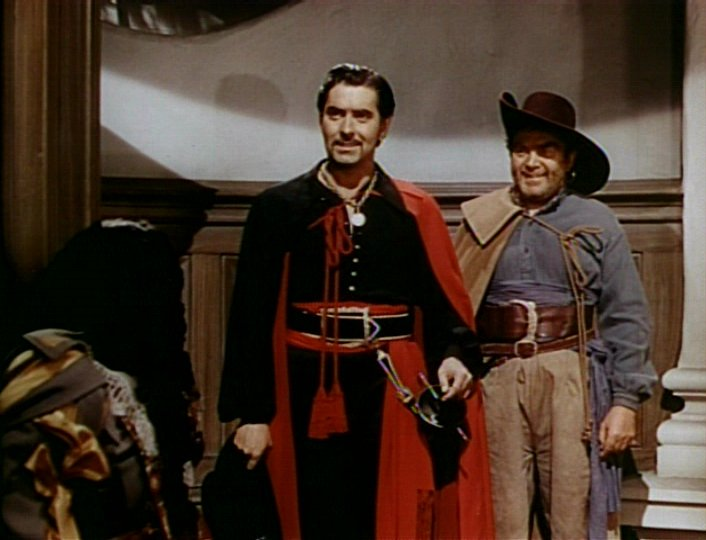
Mitchell (right) with Tyrone Power in trailer for The Black Swan (1942)

From the 1950s and into the early 1960s, Mitchell worked primarily in television, appearing in a variety of roles in some of the most well-regarded early series of the era, including Playhouse 90, Dick Powell's Zane Grey Theater (in a pilot episode that became the CBS series Johnny Ringo), and Hallmark Hall of Fame productions. In 1955, he played Kris Kringle in The 20th Century-Fox Hour version of The Miracle on 34th Street opposite Teresa Wright and MacDonald Carey.

Thomas Mitchell starred in three syndicated television series, each running 39 episodes, for producers Jack J. Gross and Philip N. Krasne. In 1954-55 there was the television adaptation of the radio program Mayor of the Town. In The O. Henry Playhouse (1956-57), Mitchell portrayed the author O. Henry, with the writer telling his slice-of-life stories. Mitchell was so successful in his portrayal that he was asked to visit high school English classes. His first appearance in Baton Rouge, Louisiana was so inspiring to the students that producers Gross and Krasne sent Mitchell on a nationwide tour of high schools. In 1959 Mitchell starred in Glencannon, filmed in England by Gross-Krasne and starring Mitchell as a ship's engineer.

Mitchell's last screen role was as a larcenous but genteel Damon Runyon character in Frank Capra's Pocketful of Miracles (1961). Mitchell's last stage role was Columbo, a detective character previously played by Bert Freed on an episode of The Chevy Mystery Show and later made famous on NBC and ABC television by Peter Falk.

== Death ==
Mitchell died on December 17, 1962, at age 70 from peritoneal mesothelioma in Beverly Hills, California. He was cremated at the Chapel of the Pines Crematory and, at his request, his ashes were placed in private vaultage.

== Acting credits ==
=== Film ===
Year	Title	Role	Director
1923	Six Cylinder Love	Bertram Rogers (film debut)	Elmer Clifton
1936	Craig's Wife	Fergus Passmore	Dorothy Arzner
1936	Adventure in Manhattan	Phil Bane	Edward Ludwig
1936	Theodora Goes Wild	Jed Waterbury	Richard Boleslawski
1937	Man of the People	William J. Grady	Edwin L. Marin
1937	When You're in Love	Hank Miller	Robert Riskin; Harry Lachman
1937	Lost Horizon	Henry Barnard	Frank Capra
1937	I Promise to Pay	District Attorney J.E. Curtis	D. Ross Lederman
1937	Make Way for Tomorrow	George Cooper	Leo McCarey
1937	The Hurricane	Dr. Kersaint	John Ford
1938	Love, Honor and Behave	Dan Painter	Stanley Logan
1938	Trade Winds	Commissioner Blackton	Tay Garnett
1939	Stagecoach	Doc Josiah Boone	John Ford
1939	Only Angels Have Wings	Kid Dabb	Howard Hawks
1939	Mr. Smith Goes to Washington	Diz Moore	Frank Capra
1939	Gone with the Wind	Gerald O'Hara	Victor Fleming
1939	The Hunchback of Notre Dame	Clopin	William Dieterle
1940	Swiss Family Robinson	William Robinson	Edward Ludwig
1940	Three Cheers for the Irish	Peter Casey	Lloyd Bacon
1940	Our Town	Dr. Gibbs	Sam Wood
1940	Angels Over Broadway	Gene Gibbons	Ben Hecht; Lee Garmes
1940	The Long Voyage Home	Driscoll	John Ford
1941	Flight from Destiny	Prof. Henry Todhunter	Vincent Sherman
1941	Out of the Fog	Jonah Goodwin	Anatole Litvak
1942	Joan of Paris	Father Antoine	Robert Stevenson
1942	Song of the Islands	Dennis O'Brien	Walter Lang
1942	Moontide	Tiny	Archie Mayo
1942	This Above All	Monty	Anatole Litvak
1942	Tales of Manhattan	John Halloway	Julien Duvivier
1942	The Black Swan	Tommy Blue	Henry King
1943	Immortal Sergeant	Sgt. Kelly	John M. Stahl
1943	The Outlaw	Pat Garrett	Howard Hughes
1943	Bataan	Cpl. Jake Feingold	Tay Garnett
1943	Flesh and Fantasy	Septimus Podgers	Julien Duvivier
1944	The Fighting Sullivans	Mr. Thomas F. Sullivan	Lloyd Bacon
1944	Buffalo Bill	Ned Buntline	William A. Wellman
1944	Wilson	Joseph Tumulty	Henry King
1944	Dark Waters	Mr. Sydney	Andre de Toth
1944	The Keys of the Kingdom	Dr. Willie Tulloch	John M. Stahl
1945	Captain Eddie	Ike Howard	Lloyd Bacon
1945	Within These Walls	Warden Michael Howland	H. Bruce Humberstone
1945	Adventure	Mudgin	Victor Fleming
1946	Three Wise Fools	Terence Alaysius O'Davern	Edward Buzzell
1946	The Dark Mirror	Police Lt. Stevenson	Robert Siodmak
1946	It's a Wonderful Life	Uncle Billy	Frank Capra
1947	High Barbaree	Capt. Thad Vail	Jack Conway
1947	The Romance of Rosy Ridge	Gill MacBean	Roy Rowland
1948	Silver River	John Plato Beck	Raoul Walsh
1949	Alias Nick Beal	Joseph Foster	John Farrow
1949	The Big Wheel	Red Stanley	Edward Ludwig
1951	Journey Into Light	Gandy	Stuart Heisler
1952	High Noon	Mayor Jonas Henderson	Fred Zinnemann
1954	Secret of the Incas	Ed Morgan	Jerry Hopper
1954	Destry	Rags Barnaby	George Marshall
1956	While the City Sleeps	Jon Day Griffith	Fritz Lang
1958	Handle With Care	Mayor Dick Williston	David Friedkin
1960	Too Young to Love	Judge Bentley	Muriel Box
1961	By Love Possessed	Noah Tuttle	John Sturges
1961	Pocketful of Miracles	Judge Henry G. Blake (final film)	Frank Capra

Writer

- Little Accident (1928) – play Little Accident
- Papa Sans le Savoir (1932) – play Little Accident
- All of Me (1934) – Dialogue Director
- All of Me (1934) – Screenplay
- Life Begins with Love (1937) – Screenplay
- Little Accident (1939) – play Little Accident
- Casanova Brown (1944) – play Little Accident
- Peter's Baby (1961) – play Little Accident (uncredited)

=== Television ===
Year	Title	Role	Notes
1950	Showtime, U.S.A.	Performer	Episode: "American Red Cross Drive"
1951	Celanese Theatre	Uncle Sid	Episode: "Ah, Wilderness!"
1951	Armstrong Circle Theatre	Performer	Episode: "The Long View"
1951–1952	Tales of Tomorrow	Prof. Frederick Vaneck/Captain Nemo	3 episodes
1951–1952	Betty Crocker Star Matinee	Performer	2 episodes
1951–1952	Pulitzer Prize Playhouse	Mr. Antrobus	2 episodes
1951–1952	Studio One in Hollywood	Various Roles	4 episodes
1951–1956	Lux Video Theatre	Various Roles	6 episodes
1952	Robert Montgomery Presents	Performer	Episode: "The Farmer's Hotel"
1952	Lights Out	Performer	Episode: "The Eyes from San Francisco"
1952	Gulf Playhouse	Performer	Episode: "Mr. Nothing"
1952	Suspense	Henry Brown/Dr. Paul Morgan	2 episodes
1953	The Doctor	Matthew Day	Episode: "Desk of Matthew Day"
1953	The Backbone of America	Fred Tupple	Television Movie
1953	Of Time and the River	William Olivier Grant	Television Movie
1953	Of Time and the River Part II	William Olivier Grant	Television Movie
1954	Omnibus	Shark Wicks	Episode: "Nobody's Fool"
1954	Medallion Theatre	Performer	Episode: "The Gentle Deception"
1954	Fireside Theatre	Performer	Episode: "Afraid to Live"
1954–1955	Mayor of the Town	Mayor Thomas Russell	39 episodes
1954–1955	General Electric Theatre	Mender McClure	2 episodes
1954–1955	The United States Steel Hour	Scotty/Silas Lapham	2 episodes
1954–1957	The Ford Television Theatre	Various Roles	6 episodes
1955	Damon Runyon Theater	Sylvester	Episode: "It Comes Up Money"
1955	The Adventures of Huckleberry Finn	Pap Finn	Television Movie
1955	Screen Directors Playhouse	Dr. Joseph H. Walton	Episode: "The Final Tribute"
1955	The Alcoa Hour	Cap. Jarvis	Episode: "Undertow"
1955	The 20th Century Fox Hour	Kris Kringle	Episode: "The Miracle on 34th Street"
1955–1956	The Star and the Story	Various Roles	3 episodes
1955–1956	Schlitz Playhouse of Stars	Carl Smith/Sam Hawkins	2 episodes
1956	Celebrity Playhouse	Cal Logan	Episode: "They Flee By Night"
1956	Chevron Hall of Stars	Performer	2 episodes
1956	Telephone Time	Andrew Hamilton	2 episodes
1957	The O. Henry Playhouse	O. Henry	39 episodes
1958	Shirley Temple's Storybook	Emperor	Episode: "The Nightingale"
1958	Kraft Television Theatre	Whitehall	Episode: "The Velvet Trap"
1958	Playhouse 90	Mr. Carson	Episode: "Natchez"
1958–1961	Zane Grey Theater	Various Roles	3 episodes
1959	Laramie	Judge Matthew Hedrick	Episode: "Dark Verdict"
1959	Goodyear Theatre	Sarge	Episode: "The Lady Bug"
1959	Glencannon	Capt. Colin Glencannon; Sgt. Harry Mork	39 episodes
1959	The Untouchables	Milo Sullivan	Episode: "The Underworld Bank"
1960	Sunday Showcase	Performer	Episode: "The Secret of Freedom"
1960	The Right Man	Grover Cleveland	Television Movie
1961	The Joke and the Valley	Truman Winters	Television Movie
1961	Adventures in Paradise	Hubert Willis	Episode: "A Penny a Day"
1961	Stagecoach West	Ethan Blount	Episode: "Image of a Man"
1961	Our American Heritage	Joseph Murray	Episode: "The Invisible Teddy"

=== Theatre ===
Year	Title	Role	Playwright	Venue
1916	Under Sentence	Performer	Roi Cooper Megrue; Irvin S. Cobb	Harris Theatre, Broadway
1917	Nju	Performer	Osip Dymov	Bandbox Theatre, Broadway
1918	Crops and Croppers	Performer	Theresa Helburn	Belmont Theatre, Broadway
1918	Redemption	Artyomyeff	Leo Tolstoy	Plymouth Theatre, Broadway
1919	Dark Rosaleen	Performer	W. D. Hepenstall; Whitford Kane	Belasco Theatre, Broadway
1920	Not So Long Ago	Sam Robinson	Arthur Richman	Booth Theatre, Broadway
1921	The Playboy of the Western World	Christy Mahon	John Millington Synge	Bramhall Playhouse, Broadway
1923	Kiki	Adolphe	David Belasco	Belasco Theatre, Broadway
1926	The Wisdom Tooth	Charley Bemis	Marc Connelly	Little Theatre, Broadway
1926	Glory Hallelujah	—N/a	Thomas Mitchell	Broadhurst Theatre, Broadway
1927	Blood Money	James Bolton	George Middleton	Hudson Theatre, Broadway
1927–28	Nightstick	Tommy Glennon	John Wray, J.C. Nugent; Elliott Nugent; Elaine Sterne Carrington	Selwyn Theatre, Broadway
1928–29	Little Accident	Norman Overbeck	Thomas Mitchell	Morosco Theatre, Broadway
1931	Cloudy with Showers	Peter Hammill	Thomas Mitchell	Morosco Theatre, Broadway
1932	Riddle Me This	McKinley	Daniel N. Rubin	John Golden Theatre, Broadway
1932	Clear All Wires	Buckley Joyce Thomas	Bella Spewack & Sam Spewack	Times Square Theatre, Broadway
1933	Honeymoon	Bob Taylor	Samuel Chotzinoff & George Backer	Little Theatre, Broadway; Vanderbilt Theatre, Broadway
1935	Fly Away Home	James Masters	Dorothy Bennett & Irving White	48th Street Theatre, Broadway
1935	Stick-in-the-Mud	Paw Meriwether	Frederick Hazlitt Brennan	48th Street Theatre, Broadway
1941	Crazy with the Heat	Performer	Sam E. Werris, Mack Davis, Max Liebman, Don Herold & Arthur Sheekman,	44th Street Theatre, Broadway
1947–49	An Inspector Calls	Inspector Goole	J.B. Priestly	Booth Theatre, Broadway
1949	The Biggest Thief in Town	Bert Hutchins	Dalton Trumbo	Mansfield Theatre, Broadway
1949–50	Death of a Salesman	Willy Loman (replacement)	Arthur Miller	Morosco Theatre, Broadway
1953	Hazel Flagg	Dr. Downer	Ben Hecht	Mark Hellinger Theatre, Broadway
1960	Cut of the Axe	Rollie Evans	Sheppard Kerman	Ambassador Theatre, Broadway

Staged by

Year	Title	Venue
1931	Cloudy with Showers	Morosco Theatre, Broadway
1932–33	Honeymoon	Little Theatre, Broadway; Vanderbilt Theatre, Broadway
1933	Forsaking All Others	Times Square Theatre, Broadway
1933	Twenty-five Dollars an Hour	Theatre Masque, Broadway
1935	Fly Away Home	48th Street Theatre, Broadway
1935	Something Gay	Morosco Theatre, Broadway
1935–36	At Home Abroad	Winter Garden Theatre, Broadway
1935	Stick-in-the-Mud	48th Street Theatre, Broadway

=== Radio ===
Year	Program	Episode/source
1953	Theatre Guild on the Air	A Square Peg
1945	Suspense	1945-02-22 John Barby and Son

== Awards and nominations ==
In 1953, Mitchell became the first male actor to win the Triple Crown of Acting (he's one of 24 performers to have reached this achievement).

Year	Award	Category	Project	Result
1937	Academy Awards	Best Supporting Actor	The Hurricane	Nominated
1939	Academy Awards	Best Supporting Actor	Stagecoach	Won
1939	National Board of Review	Best Actor	Stagecoach	Nominated
1940	New York Film Critics Circle	Best Actor	The Long Voyage Home	Nominated
1940	National Board of Review	Best Actor	The Long Voyage Home	Won
1942	National Board of Review	Best Actor	Moontide	Won
1952	Primetime Emmy Awards	Best Actor	—N/a	Nominated
1953	Primetime Emmy Awards	Best Actor	—N/a	Won
1955	Primetime Emmy Awards	Best Actor in a Single Performance	The Ford Television Theatre	Nominated
1953	Tony Award	Best Actor in a Musical	Hazel Flagg	Won

- He has two stars on the Hollywood Walk of Fame, one for his work in television at 6100 Hollywood Boulevard, and a second star for his work in motion pictures at 1651 Vine Street.

== See also ==
- List of actors with Academy Award nominations
