= Little Accident =

- Original language: English
- Written by: Floyd Dell and Thomas Mitchell
- Genre: Comedy
- Setting: Overbeck home, Ellen Harris Hospital reception room in Chicago, Mrs. Case's Boarding House, Chicago

Premiere
- Date: October 9, 1928
- Place: Morosco Theatre, New York City, New York

Little Accident was a 1928 Broadway three-act comedy written by Floyd Dell and Thomas Mitchell (who also played Norman Overbeck in the play). It was based on Dell's 1927 novel An Unmarried Father. It was produced by Crosby Gaige and directed by Joseph Graham and Arthur Hurley running for 303 performances from October 9, 1928, to July 1929 at the Morosco Theatre and the Ambassador Theatre. It was included in Burns Mantle's The Best Plays of 1928-1929.

The play and the novel were made into the 1930 film The Little Accident starring Douglas Fairbanks Jr. and Anita Page and the 1939 film Little Accident starring Hugh Herbert and Florence Rice. Both films were released by Universal Pictures.

== Cast ==
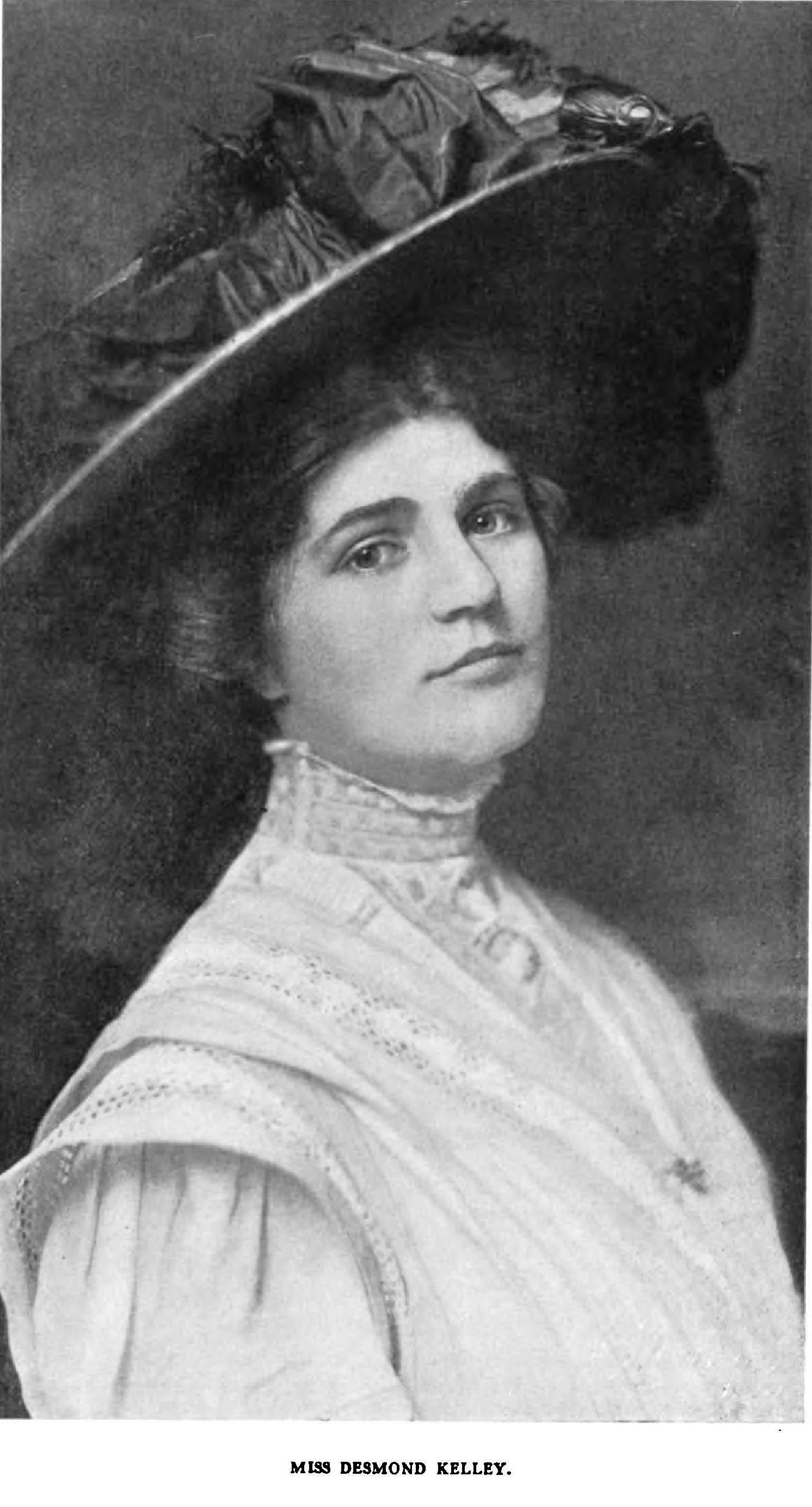
Desmond Kelley 1909

- Geraldine Wall as Doris Overbeck
- Malcolm Williams as J.J. Overbeck
- Katherine Carrington as Lucinda Overbeck
- Susanne Jackson as Mrs. Overbeck
- Thomas Mitchell as Norman Overbeck
- Katharine Alexander as Isabel Drury
- Patricia Barclay as Monica Case
- Clare Woodbury as Mrs. Case
- Madelaine Barr as Katie
- Florence Brinton as Janet Parke
- Elizabeth Bruce as Miss Hemingway
- John Butler as Hicks
- Elvia Enders as Madge Ferris
- Harry Forsman as Rev. Doctor Gifford
- Olga Hanson as Miss Clark
- Desmond Kelley as Doctor Zernecke
- Helen Myrnes as Emily Crane
- Adrian Rosely as Rudolpho Amendelaro
- Fleming Ward as Gilbert Rand
- Emory Parnell as Policeman
