= Floyd Dell =

American editor, critic, and writer (1887–1969)

- Born: Floyd James Dell; June 28, 1887; Barry, Illinois, United States
- Died: July 23, 1969 (aged 82); Bethesda, Maryland, United States
- Occupations: Critic; magazine editor; novelist
- Known for: Friday Literary Review; The Masses; Homecoming
- Spouses: Margery Currey; Berta Marie Gage

Floyd James Dell (June 28, 1887 – July 23, 1969) was an American newspaper and magazine editor, literary critic, novelist, playwright, and poet. Dell has been called "one of the most flamboyant, versatile and influential American Men of Letters of the first third of the 20th Century." In Chicago, he was editor of the nationally syndicated Friday Literary Review. As editor and critic, Dell's influence is seen in the work of many major American writers from the first half of the 20th century. A lifelong poet, he was also a best-selling author, as well as a playwright whose hit Broadway comedy, Little Accident (1928), was made into a Hollywood movie.

Dell wrote extensively on controversial social issues of the early 20th century, and played a major part in the political and social movements originating in New York City's Greenwich Village during the 1910s & 1920s. As editor of left-wing magazine The Masses, Dell was twice put on trial for publishing subversive literature.

== Biography ==
=== Early life and career ===
Dell was born in Barry, Illinois, on June 28, 1887, to Anthony Dell, a Civil War veteran and unsuccessful butcher, and Kate Crone, a home maker. Dell spent his childhood in poverty, with his family moving often. He lived in Quincy, Illinois, for a large portion of his childhood. Encouraged by his mother, a former school teacher, Dell became a voracious reader, spending much of his time at Quincy's local library.

In 1903 Dell moved with his family to Davenport, Iowa, which was then a liberal and cosmopolitan port city and center of trade with a thriving literary and intellectual scene. Initially attending Davenport High School, Dell did not return to school after the summer of 1904, instead becoming a reporter at a local paper. Dell also became an active socialist and associated with other local writers to form what would be called the 'Davenport group'. While in Davenport, Dell also began publishing poetry, first in local papers, then in national periodicals. By the time Dell left Davenport for Chicago in 1908, he had escaped blue-collar life to emerge as a promising young professional writer and intellectual. It was also in Davenport that Dell met Marilla Waite Freeman, the director of the library. Dell is quoted as saying that he "caught a glimpse of mountaintops" through Freeman's inspiration, and he dedicated a number of poems and novels to her. Freeman also served as the model for the librarian character, Helen Raymond, in Moon-Calf.

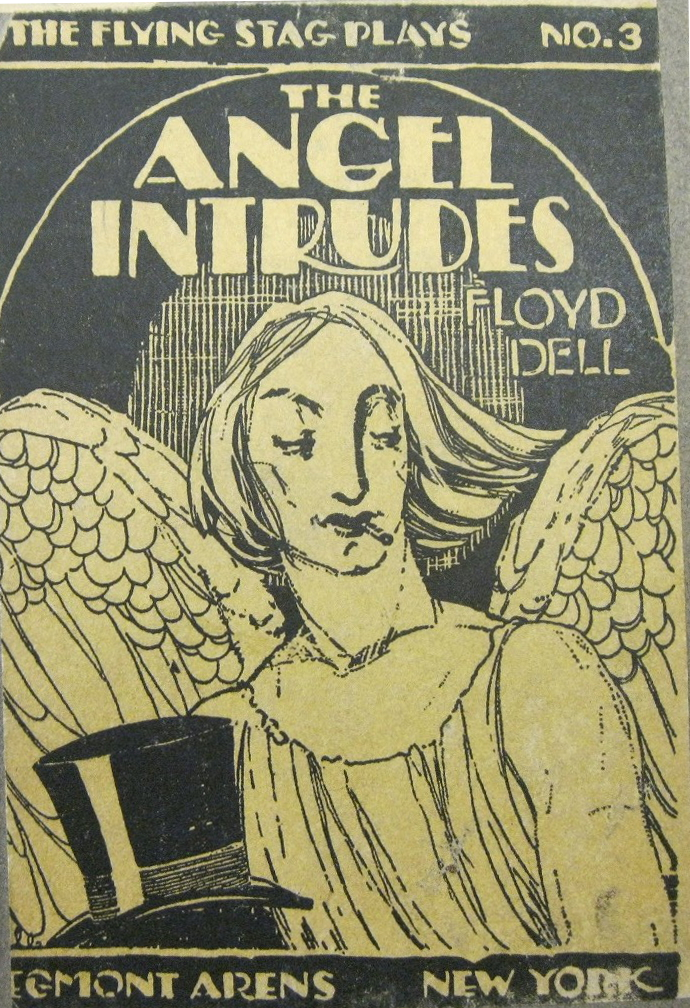
Playbook for The Angel Intrudes (1917).

In Chicago Dell became editor and book reviewer for of the Chicago Evening Post's nationally distributed Friday Literary Review, the "leading organ of literary modernism in America at the time." Dell used his position as editor to introduce many Americans to modernist literature and promote the work of many Chicago writers, including Theodore Dreiser, Sherwood Anderson, and Carl Sandburg. Dell's further influence as a critic can be seen in the work of many major American writers from the first half of the 20th century.

=== Greenwich Village ===
Relocating to New York City in 1913, Dell became a leader of the pre-war bohemian community in Greenwich Village and managing editor of Max Eastman's radical magazine The Masses. His housemate, the poet Orrick Johns, said of him during this period, "...he was working like a dock laborer. I think he must have spent twenty hours a day writing, for his typewriter could always be heard." Following the passing of the Espionage Act of 1917, the government officially labeled The Masses "treasonable material" in August of that year and issued charges against its staff for "unlawfully and willfully… obstruct[ing] the recruiting and enlistment of the United States" military. The "conspirators" faced fines up to 10,000 dollars and twenty years imprisonment. After deliberating for three days, the jury was unable to come to a unanimous decision. The jurors seeking to convict the defendants blamed one juror for being unable to conform to the majority opinion, as he was also a socialist. Not only did the other eleven jurors demand that the prosecutor levy charges against the lone juror, they attempted to drag the socialist supporter out into the street and lynch him. The Judge, given the uproar, declared a mistrial. A second trial also resulted in a deadlocked jury. In 1918 Dell joined Crystal and Max Eastman co-editing The Masses' successor, The Liberator.

Dell joined fellow Davenporters Susan Glaspell and George Cram Cook as a member of the Provincetown Players and his play King Arthur's Socks was the first performed by that historic theater group.

=== Later life and career ===
Following the war, Dell turned to fiction and his first novel, the bildungsroman (or coming-of-age) Moon-Calf, became a best seller. It was an early book for the publisher Alfred A. Knopf and published at a time when many mid-western writers were writing about small-town life; Sinclair Lewis's book Main Street was published within days of Moon-Calf. By 1920 Moon-Calf had sold 38,500 copies and went through eleven printings.

This was followed by several other novels with limited success. His autobiographical memoir, Homecoming, is a striking eyewitness view of the social and artistic-bohemian history of the midwest. Dell continued to publish both fiction and non-fiction until the end of his life.

Dell joined the WPA and U.S. Information Service in 1935 from which he retired following World War II. He married Beatrice Marie, and had two sons. One son, Christopher Dell, became a writer as well. He married and had two daughters: Jerri Dell who is the current literary executor and archivist of the Dell Collection, and Kathryn Dell Kaufman; then he divorced and remarried Kate Kane. With Kate he had a daughter, Mia Dell, who is married and has three children.

Floyd Dell died in Bethesda, Maryland, near Washington, D.C., on July 23, 1969.

In 2015, he was inducted into the Chicago Literary Hall of Fame.

== Partial bibliography ==
Novels

- (1920) Moon-Calf
- (1921) The Briary-Bush
- (1923) Janet March
- (1925) This Mad Ideal
- (1925) Runaway
- (1926) Love in Greenwich Village
- (1926) An Old Man's Folly
- (1927) An Unmarried Father
- (1929) Souvenir
- (1931) Love Without Money
- (1932) Diana Stair
- (1934) The Golden Spike

Non-fiction

- (1913) Women as World Builders
- (1919) Were You Ever a Child?
- (1924) Looking at Life; essays
- (1926) Intellectual Vagabondage; essays
- (1926) The Outline of Marriage
- (1927) Upton Sinclair: A Study in Social Protest
- (1930) Love in the Machine Age
- (1933) Homecoming; autobiography
- (1947) Government Aid During the Depression to Professional, Technical and Other Service Workers (Washington: Government Printing Office)
- (1947) Final Report on the WPA Program, 1935-43 (Washington: Government Printing Office)

Essays

- (1914) Feminism for Men
- (1914) Mona Lisa and the Wheelbarrow
- (1915) The Censor's Triumph
- (1915) Enter the Woman

Plays

- (1913) Human Nature: A Very Short Morality Play
- (1914) Chaste Adventures Of Joseph: A Comedy
- (1914) Ibsen Revisited: A Piece Of Foolishness
- (1915) Enigma: A Domestic Conversation
- (1915) Rim Of The World: A Fantasy
- (1915) Legend: A Romance
- (1916) King Arthur's Socks: A Comedy
- (1917) Long Time Ago: A Tragic Fantasy
- (1917) Angel Intrudes: A Comedy
- (1918) Sweet-And-Twenty: A Comedy
- (1920) Poor Harold: A Comedy
- (1928) Little Accident
