= List of Patricia Morison performances =

This is a chronological listing of Patricia Morison's major acting credits. It includes her stage, screen, and television work, as well as one of her radio credits.

== Credits ==
=== 1933–1940 ===
Medium	Title	Date	Theatre, Studio, or Network	Role	Notes / Other Performers
Stage	Don't Mind the Rain	1933	Provincetown Playhouse		Morison performed the song "Simple Silly I."
Stage	Growing Pains	November 23, 1933	Ambassador	Helen	A comedy by Aurania Rouveral. With Johnny Downs, Jean Rouverah, Joan Wheeler, Charles Eaton, Eddie Acuff, Phillipe De Lacy, Georgette McKee (Andrea King). 29 performances.
Stage	Victoria Regina	December 26, 1935	Broadhurst	(Understudy)	A drama by Laurence Housman. With Helen Hayes, Vincent Price. Morison understudied all the women in cast. 517 performances.
Film	Wreckless	1935	Jam Handy Organization	Mary Jane	Martin Griffith
Stage	The Two Bouquets	May 31, 1938	Windsor	Laura Rivers	An operetta by Eleanor and Herbert Farjeon. With Marcy Wescott, Alfred Drake, Winston O'Keefe, Leo G. Carroll, Leslie French. 55 performances.
Film	Persons in Hiding	1939	Paramount	Dorothy Bronson	Lynne Overman, J. Carrol Naish.
Film	I'm from Missouri	1939	Paramount	Mrs. Allison Hamilton aka Rowe	Bob Burns, Gladys George.
Film	The Magnificent Fraud	1939	Paramount	Claire Hill	Lloyd Nolan, Akim Tamiroff.
Film	Untamed	1940	Paramount	Alverna Easter	Ray Milland, Akim Tamiroff, William Frawley. Filmed in Technicolor.
Film	Rangers of Fortune	1940	Paramount	Sharon McCloud	Fred MacMurray, Albert Dekker.
Film	Romance of the Rio Grande	1940	20th Century-Fox	Rosita	Cesar Romero (as the Cisco Kid), Ricardo Cortez, Chris-Pin Martin.
Film	Meet the Stars #1: Chinese Garden Festival	1940	Republic	Herself	

=== 1941–1950 ===
Medium	Title	Date	Theatre, Studio, or Network	Role	Notes / Other Performers
Film	The Round Up	1941	Paramount	Janet Allen	Richard Dix, Preston Foster.
Film	One Night in Lisbon	1941	Paramount	Gerry Houston	Fred MacMurray, Madeleine Carroll.
Film	Meet the Stars #6: Stars at Play	1941	Republic	Herself	Jane Withers, Cesar Romero.
Film	Meet the Stars #8: Stars Past and Present	1941	Republic	Herself	
Film	Beyond the Blue Horizon	1942	Paramount	Sylvia	Dorothy Lamour. Filmed in Technicolor.
Film	Night in New Orleans	1942	Paramount	Ethel Abbott	Preston Foster, Albert Dekker.
Film	Are Husbands Necessary?	1942	Paramount	Myra Ponsonby	Ray Milland, Betty Field.
Stage	USO Tour	August 22, 1942	—	Herself	Al Jolson, Merle Oberon, Allen Jenkins, Frank McHugh.
Film	Silver Skates	1943	Monogram	Claire	Kenny Baker, Belita.
Film	Hitler's Madman	1943	M-G-M	Jarmilla Hanka	John Carradine, Alan Curtis.
Film	The Fallen Sparrow	1943	RKO Radio	Barby Taviton	John Garfield, Maureen O'Hara.
Film	The Song of Bernadette	1943	20th Century-Fox	Empress Eugenie	Jennifer Jones, Joseph Cotten, Vincent Price.
Film	Calling Dr. Death	1943	Universal	Stella Madden	Lon Chaney Jr., Ramsay Ames. Part of the "Inner Sanctum" series.
Film	Where Are Your Children?	1943	Monogram	Linda Woodford	Jackie Cooper, Gale Storm
Stage	Allah Be Praised!	April 20, 1944	Adelphi	Marcia Mason Moore	A Musical Comedy written by George Marion Jr. Music: Baldwin Bergersen. With Joey Faye, Sid Stone, Jack Albertson, Mary Jane Walsh, John Hoysradt, Sheila Bond. 20 performances.
Film	Without Love	1945	M-G-M	Edwina Collins	Spencer Tracy, Katharine Hepburn
Film	Lady on a Train	1945	Universal	Joyce Williams	Deanna Durbin, Ralph Bellamy, Dan Duryea.
Film	Dressed to Kill	1946	Universal	Mrs. Hilda Courtney	Basil Rathbone (as Sherlock Holmes), Nigel Bruce (as Dr. Watson).
Film	Danger Woman	1946	Universal	Eve Ruppert	Don Porter, Brenda Joyce.
Film	Queen of the Amazons	1946	Screen Guild	Jean Preston	Robert Lowery.
Film	Tarzan and the Huntress	1947	RKO Radio	Tanya Rawlins	Johnny Weissmuller, Brenda Joyce, Johnny Sheffield, Barton MacLane.
Film	Song of the Thin Man	1947	M-G-M	Phyllis Talbin	William Powell, Myrna Loy, Leon Ames.
Film	Kiss of Death	1947	20th Century-Fox	Mrs. Bianco (scenes deleted prior to release)	Victor Mature, Brian Donlevy, Richard Widmark.
Film	The Prince of Thieves	1947	Columbia	Maid Marian	Jon Hall (as Robin Hood), Adele Jergens. Filmed in Cinecolor.
Film	Sofia	1948	Film Classics	Magda Onescu	Gene Raymond, Sigrid Gurie, Mischa Auer. Filmed in Cinecolor on location in Mexico.
Film	The Return of Wildfire	1948	Screen Guild	Pat Marlowe	Richard Arlen. Released in sepiatone.
Stage	Kiss Me, Kate	December 30, 1948	New Century	Lilli Vanessi	A Musical Comedy By Samuel and Bella Spewack. Songs By Cole Porter. With Alfred Drake, Lisa Kirk, Harold Lang. Ran until July 28, 1951. 1,077 performances.
TV	The Toast of the Town	February 22, 1949	CBS	Herself	Hosted by Ed Sullivan.
TV	The Toast of the Town	April 10, 1949	CBS	Herself	Hosted by Ed Sullivan.
TV	The Jack Carter Show	September 23, 1950	CBS	Herself	Hosted by Jack Carter. Other guest: Cesar Romero.
TV	Robert Montgomery Presents; Episode: "Rio Rita"	November 13, 1950	NBC	Rio Rita	
TV	Nash Airflyte Theatre; Episode: "Trial By Jury"	November 30, 1950	CBS	Angeline	

=== 1951–1960 ===
Medium	Title	Date	Theatre, Studio, or Network	Role	Notes / Other Performers
TV	Pulitzer Prize Playhouse; Episode: "Light Up The Sky"	January 19, 1951	ABC		
Stage	Kiss Me, Kate	March 8, 1951	Coliseum	Lilli Vanessi	Bill Johnson, Julie Wilson, Walter Long; 400 performances.
Radio	The Railroad Hour; Episode: "Frederika"	February 18, 1952	NBC	Frederika	Gordon MacRae. Based on the operetta by Franz Lehár
TV	The Cases of Eddie Drake	March 6, 1952	DuMont	Dr. Karen Gayle	Don Haggerty
TV	Celanese Theatre; Episode: "When Ladies Meet"	May 11, 1952	ABC		
TV	Four Star Playhouse; Episode: "The Man in the Box"	February 26, 1953	CBS		
TV	Four Star Playhouse; Episode: "The Ladies on his Mind"	May 21, 1953	CBS	Charlotte Kirby	Ronald Colman, Benita Hume, Hillary Brooke
TV	Lux Video Theatre; Episode: "The Moment of the Rose"	November 19, 1953	CBS		
Stage	The King And I	February 22, 1954	St. James	Anna Leonowens	A musical by Richard Rodgers and Oscar Hammerstein II. With Yul Brynner. Succeeded Gertrude Lawrence, Celeste Holm, Constance Carpenter, and Annamary Dickey. Morison performed in the play until it closed on March 20, 1954, then continued with its tour.
TV	The Toast of the Town	March 28, 1954	CBS	Herself	Performed songs from The King And I.
Stage	The King And I	May 17, 1954	Los Angeles Civic Light Opera Auditorium	Anna Leonowens	
TV	Screen Directors Playhouse; Episode: "Dream"	May 16, 1956	NBC	Vivienne Monet	
TV	Schlitz Playhouse Of Stars; Episode: "The Trophy"	October 12, 1956	CBS	Jennifer Mauldron	
TV	Lux Video Theatre; Episode: "Eileen"	March 14, 1957	CBS	Eileen	Gordon MacRae
TV	Hallmark Hall of Fame; Episode: "Kiss Me, Kate"	November 20, 1958	NBC	Lilli Vanessi	With Alfred Drake. Originally broadcast in color.
TV	Have Gun — Will Travel; Episode: "The Moor's Revenge"	December 27, 1958	CBS	Victoria Vestris	Richard Boone, Vincent Price, Morey Amsterdam.
TV	The Voice of Firestone; Episode: "Concert"	March 1959	NBC	Herself	
Stage	The King And I	June 11, 1959	Municipal Theatre, St. Louis, MO	Anna Leonowens	
Stage	Gay 90's Night	1959	Tour	Herself	
Film	Song Without End	1960	Columbia	George Sand	Dirk Bogarde, Capucine

=== 1961–2003 ===
Medium	Title	Date	Theatre, Studio, or Network	Role	Notes / Other Performers
TV	U.S. Steel Hour; Episode: "The Secrets Of Stella Crozier"	March 20, 1963	CBS	Stella Crozier	
TV	Kiss Me, Kate	April 20, 1964	BBC	Lilli Vanessi	Howard Keel, Millicent Martin
Stage	Kiss Me, Kate	April 1965	Opera House, Seattle, WA	Lilli Vanessi	
Stage	Kiss Me, Kate	May 12, 1965	New York City Center	Lilli Vanessi	
TV	The Tony Awards	March 28, 1971	Palace	Herself	Morison and Yul Brynner performed "Shall We Dance" from The King and I.
Stage	The Sound of Music	August 22, 1972	Dorothy Chandler Pavilion, Los Angeles, CA	Elsa Schraeder	
TV	Benjamin Franklin (mini series)	1974	CBS		Eddie Albert, Melvyn Douglas, Lloyd Bridges, Beau Bridges.
Film	Won Ton Ton — The Dog Who Saved Hollywood	1976	Paramount	Star at screening	Bruce Dern, Madeline Kahn, Art Carney, Phil Silvers, numerous guest stars
Stage	Kiss Me, Kate	November 1978	Birmingham Repertory Theatre, England	Lilli Vanessi	Stephen Arlen, Bob Grant, John Hewer, Timothy Spall, Laurel Ford, Roger Allam
TV	Mirrors	1984	NBC	Mrs. Rome	Tim Daly, Shanna Reed, Signe Hasso, Keenan Wynn.
TV	Cheers; Episode: "Send in the Crane"	1989	NBC	Mrs. Ridgeway	Ted Danson, Kirstie Alley
Film	Broadway — The Golden Age	2003	Second Act Productions	Herself	

=== Other credits ===
Throughout the 1960s and 1970s, Morison performed on stage numerous times — largely in stock and touring productions. These included both musical and dramatic plays, among them Milk and Honey, Kismet, The Merry Widow, Song of Norway, Do I Hear a Waltz?, Bell, Book and Candle, The Fourposter, Separate Tables, and Private Lives.

== Sources ==
- List of Patricia Morison performances at the Internet Broadway Database
- Patricia Morison at IMDb
- Dossier of Patricia Morison prepared by theatre and film historian Miles Krueger at the Institute of the American Musical, Inc., Los Angeles, California, April 29, 1999.
