= Sam Wood =

American director, producer, and actor

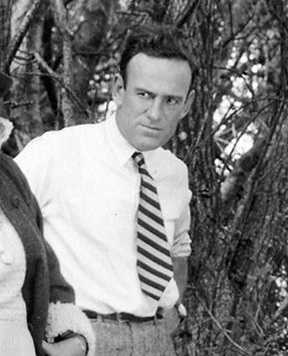
- Wood directing Beyond the Rocks (1922)
- Born: Samuel Grosvenor Wood; July 10, 1883; Philadelphia, Pennsylvania, U.S.
- Died: September 22, 1949 (aged 66); Hollywood, California, U.S.
- Other name: Shad Applegate
- Occupations: Film director; writer; producer; actor; real estate broker
- Years active: 1917–1949
- Spouse: Clara L. Roush (m. 1908)
- Children: 2

Samuel Grosvenor Wood (July 10, 1883 – September 22, 1949) was an American film director and producer who is best known for having directed such Hollywood hits as A Night at the Opera, A Day at the Races, Goodbye, Mr. Chips, The Pride of the Yankees, and For Whom the Bell Tolls and for his uncredited work directing parts of Gone with the Wind. He was also involved in a few acting and writing projects.

As a youth, Wood developed an enthusiasm for physical fitness that persisted into his senior years and influenced his interest in making sports-themed films.

Wood advanced from making largely competent yet routine pictures in the 1920s and 1930s to directing several highly regarded works during the 1940s at the peak of his abilities, among them Kings Row (1942) and Ivy (1947).

Wood's quick, efficient and professional execution of his film assignments endeared him to studio executives, and though not a "brilliant" director, Wood's legacy represents "a long and respectable film career."

== Early life and family ==
Samuel Grosvenor Wood was born on July 10, 1883, in Philadelphia, Pennsylvania, to William Henry Wood and Katherine (née Corn) Wood. He attended M. Hall Stanton School. One of Wood's daughters, born Gloria Wood, was film and television actress K.T. Stevens.

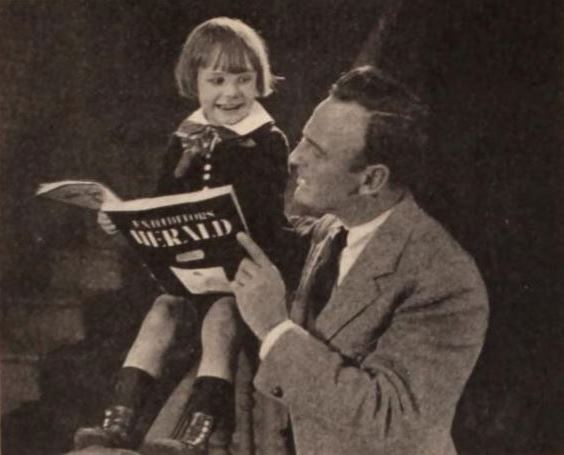
Jackie Coogan and director Sam Wood; publicity shot for Peck's Bad Boy (1921)

Spent time in Summers around 1900 on the Atlantic City beach with friends.

== Early career in Hollywood ==
When Wood turned 18 years old in the summer of 1901, he and a companion began a year-long trek across the United States, ultimately arriving in Los Angeles, where Wood embarked on a successful career as a real estate broker. By 1906, the then-primitive film industry in Southern California enticed Wood to gain entrée into the nascent industry by acting, adopting the screen name "Chad Applegate." He carefully concealed his (then regarded) ill-reputed avocation from real estate associates and clients.

In 1908, Wood married Clara Louise Roush, who encouraged her spouse to commit to a career in film. Spurred by a collapse in the real estate market, Wood obtained work as a movie production assistant and, by 1914, was serving as an assistant director to Cecil B. DeMille. During the next five years, Wood contributed to the manufacture of hundreds of movies shorts as an assistant director, mostly for Paramount Pictures.

== Directorial debut: The Wallace Reid films, 1920 ==
At the end of 1919, Wood won his first assignment as director in the Paramount feature Double Speed, the first of five films he was paired with screen star Wallace Reid, all of which were filmed and released in 1920. Wood demonstrated efficient and effective direction that made him attractive to Paramount executives. The success of these hour-long action comedies were highly praised by production head Jesse Lasky for their "assembly line" output and profitability.

Reid, injured during a shoot in 1919, suffered from chronic pain that he treated with morphine (a functioning addict during his collaboration with Wood, he would die in 1923 at the age of 32 due to complications related to his addiction).

Despite the outstanding success of his Reid features, Wood expressed a desire to work on other projects. Paramount, "perhaps as a sign of displeasure" obliged Wood by demoting him to their subsidiary movie unit, Realart, a venue for the production of low-budget "routine programme pictures" that offered little in the way of substance. Wood endured the assignment, making four films at Realart, starring Ethel Clayton and Wanda Hawley, all filmed in 1920. Wood's perseverance at Realart earned him a reputation as a reliable studio asset.

== Swanson & Wood (1921-1923) ==
Sam Wood was all right, but he was a real estate dealer at heart...there was nothing of the temperamental artist about him. We had been grinding out pictures since The Great Moment, and each one was worse than the last. The only thing that changed was the number and the length of dresses I wore and the face of the leading man.

— Gloria Swanson, from her memoir Swanson on Swanson (1980).

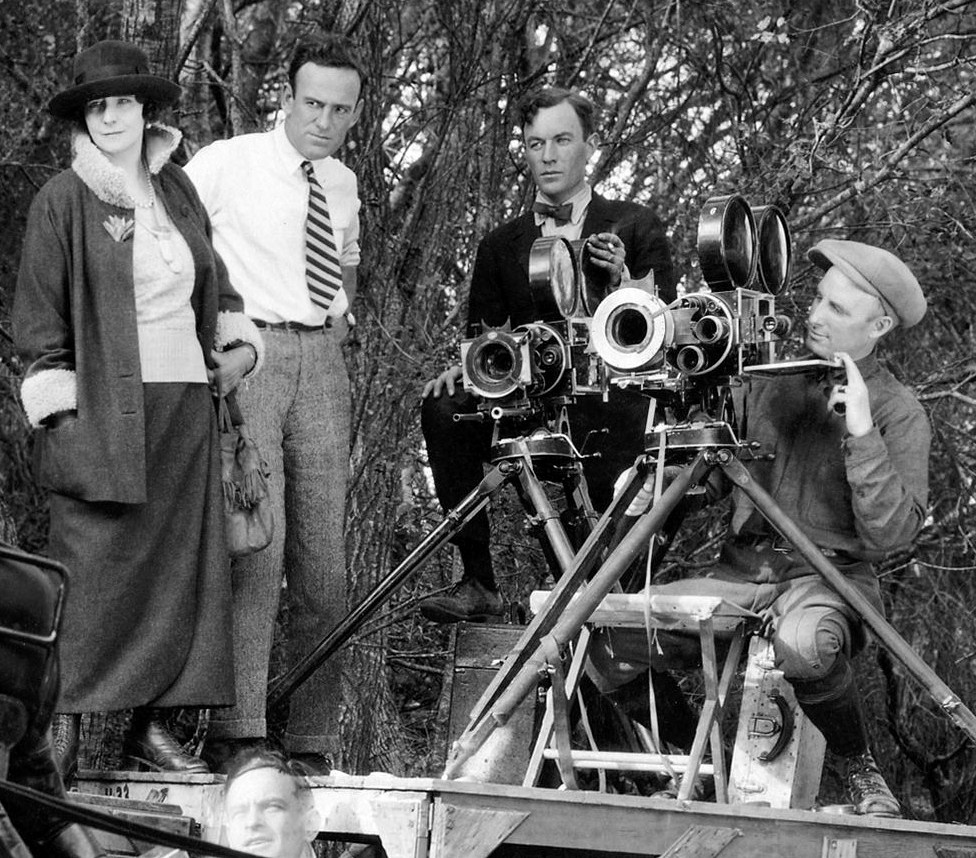
Edythe Chapman (actress), Sam Wood, Alfred Gilks (cinematographer) & Osmond Borradaile (cameraman), on the set of Beyond the Rocks

Paramount's appreciation for Wood's "fast, efficient" delivery of film products and his excellent rapport with his cast and crew landed him the honor of directing their recently acquired actor Gloria Swanson in her first starring vehicle, The Great Moment (1921). DeMille, whom Wood had served as an assistant director from 1914 to 1916, and Swanson, a close personal friend to Wood, each influenced Paramount's choice.

With the popular success of The Great Moment, co-starring Milton Sills (in one scandalous scene, he sucks rattlesnake venom from Swanson's chest) Paramount proceeded to finance nine more Swanson-Wood collaborations over the next two years, beginning with Under the Lash (1921) and finishing with Bluebeard's 8th Wife (1923). Cameraman Alfred Gilks photographed all ten of the productions. During the Wood-Swanson series of films "the costume department broke all records for Hollywood lavishness..."

Wood's pictures included an array of scenarios and settings, providing abundant opportunities for Swanson and her leading men to "besport themselves in a variety of period costumes" (e.g. Beyond the Rocks (1922) with Rudolf Valentino), and to appear in the "daring modern clothing" of the Jazz Age (e.g. Prodigal Daughters (1923) with Ralph Graves). Swanson's silent film career was significantly enhanced by these Wood productions. However, In 1923 by mutual consent, Swanson and Wood agreed to conclude their collaboration.

Sam Wood and Swanson "had clearly found the formula for success in these romantic comedies of marriage and intrigue laced with a series of handsome leading men and a never-ending parade of fabulous gowns."

== Principal Pictures (1924-1925) ==
In late 1923, Wood's relationship with Paramount began deteriorating due to his discontent over the quality of his project assignments. Wood completed the "heavy-handed morality tale" His Children's Children at the end of 1923, and only made Bluff (1924) with Agnes Ayers under protest due to his low appraisal of Ayers' star potential.

Wood accepted two offers from producer Irving "Sol" Lesser of the newly formed Principal Pictures to make "a most unusual film", The Female (1924), set in the South African Veld starring Betty Compson, as well as a Western and Wood's first effort in this genre, The Mine with the Iron Door (1924) with Dorothy Mackaill. Wood consented to make another film with Dorothy Mackaill for Paramount in The Next Corner (1924) that despite its "expensive production values" was burdened with a "meager plot". Wood and Paramount reached an impasse when he refused to direct another Agnes Ayers vehicle. Wood was officially suspended from Paramount and the other major studios for a year.

Sol Lesser at Principal Pictures reached out to Wood to direct a film version of novelist Harold Bell Wright's The Re-Creation of Brian Kent, a soap opera. When Wood's adaptation proved a box office success, Paramount executives sought to lure Wood back to the studio, bestowing on him a lavishly financed production, Fascinating Youth (1926). Wood completed the "light comedy" but remained convinced that he had no future with Paramount and successfully arranged for a release from his contract.

Wood's separation from Paramount proved to be fortuitous for the director. Indeed, it was "a major turning point in his career." In 1927, he briefly directed films for Cole-Robertson Pictures, a small Boston outfit, and simultaneously negotiated a long-term commitment to Hollywood's dominant studio, Metro-Goldwyn-Mayer (M-G-M).

== Cole-Robertson Pictures (1926-1927) ==
Robertson-Cole Pictures (soon to be the Film Booking Company, F.B.O and later associated with RKO Radio Studios) instantly picked up the now available Wood. Production manager Joseph P. Kennedy had famous sports hero "Red" Grange under contract and Wood, a gridiron enthusiast, welcomed the opportunity to deliver a compelling football story, One Minute to Play (1926). Wood directed Grange a second time in a small epic honoring horse racing. Emphasizing the virtues of the sport rather than the less than impressive acting performance by Grange, A Racing Romeo (1927), completed Wood's duties for Cole-Robertson.

== Early MGM years ==
Wood's first two assignments for MGM, Rookies, with Karl Dane and George K. Arthur, and The Fair Co-Ed with Marion Davies were comedies, both made in 1927, earning him a long-term contract with the studio for whom he would almost exclusively make films for over ten years.

Wood proceeded to bring his signature speed and efficiency to MGM, directing their top stars and supplied with screenplays "of the slimmest material": Norma Shearer in The Latest from Paris (1928), William Haines in Telling the World (1928), the Duncan Sisters (1929) in It's a Great Life and in his first sound film in 1929, introduced actor Robert Montgomery.

Wood was renowned for consistently delivering his features "on time and on budget", but these virtues, which pleased the Front Office, "militated against his getting worthier assignments." Two more comedies followed in 1930, The Girl Said No and They Learned About Women, the latter with a baseball theme and a sentimental vehicle starring German actor Louis Mann in a fine performance, and with co-star Robert Montgomery.

Wood directed silent matinee idol John Gilbert in a maritime romance-adventure Way for a Sailor, a vehicle that the actor hoped would redeem his reputation in the emerging "talkies". Gilbert was poorly cast as a tough seaman opposite Wallace Beery. Legend has it that M-G-M's studio chief Louis B. Mayer was complicit in miscasting Gilbert in a virile role that did not suit his image, and Wood failed to salvage his performance. Concentrating on action scenes depicting high seas shipwrecks and rescues, Wood invested Way for the Sailor with no more than a measure of realism.

Silent movie flapper and rising talkie star Joan Crawford was paired with Wood for Paid (1930), a crime drama that benefited from Wood's "taut" execution and Charles Rosher's cinematography,

Wood followed with two less fortunate assignments and the last two of the four features he would make with William Haines: A Tailor Made Man and New Adventures of Get Rich Quick Wallingford, both 1931. Haines would subsequently retire from acting to become a successful interior decorator. Wood finished off the year by directing his final and successful film with Robert Montgomery, The Man in Possession, a "knockabout comedy." He was credited only as a producer on this last film; although Wood did direct The Man in Possession, the film bears no director credit.

=== Ramon Novarro: Huddle and The Barbarian, 1932-1933 ===
The 1932 Huddle was another opportunity for Wood to demonstrate his talent for presenting American collegiate football. Madge Evans appears opposite leading man Ramon Novarro, a silent era star who struggled to make the transition to sound films.

In a bid to revitalize Novarro's career, M-G-M tasked Wood with filming a remake of the "romantic-exotic" silent era success The Arab, originally filmed by director Cecil B DeMille in 1915 starring Edgar Selwyn, and in 1924, starring the then 25-year old Navarro, both carrying the same title. Wood remade The Barbarian with emerging film star Myrna Loy as the object of Novarro's affection, who steals her from fiancé Reginald Denny in this cinematic ally "attractive minor package".

=== Prosperity (1932) and Christopher Bean (1933): Marie Dressler ===
A former star in stage and Vaudeville, the 62-year-old Marie Dressler and co-star Wallace Beery scored a huge financial success for M-G-M, with the 1930 Min and Bill, directed by George Hill, earning her an Academy Award for Best Actress. Wood directed Dressler in this fast-paced light comedy Prosperity (1933), about a small-town bank president (Dressler) who spars with her provincial neighbors and patrons. Wood was reunited with Dressler in 1933 to make Christopher Bean, a light burlesque on the humorous aspects of greed.

=== Hold Your Man (1933): Jean Harlow and Clark Gable ===
Wood served as both producer and director on Hold Your Man, a dual role that he did not relish within the "assembly-line" organization that prevailed in the major studios of the 1930s. The assignment, however, was a promotion for Wood, providing him with the opportunity to make a crime-romance that is "sentimental, cheeky, wise-cracking" and as always "swiftly paced" and featuring two of M-G-M's top stars of the period, Jean Harlow and Clark Gable.

After finishing his two Dressler features, Wood made the second of his three films with Myrna Loy, Stamboul Quest (1934), a spy-romance set in Turkish Dardanelles during World War I. Loy plays a Mata Hari-like character pursued by counter-spies and her devoted swain George Brent. Wood enjoyed the services of James Wong Howe's expert cinematography. During Wood's decade-long tenure with M-G-M, he made only one film for another studio, Edward Small's Reliance studios. Let 'Em Have It (1935) stars Richard Arlen in an Underworld vs. G-man themed story that Wood attempted to add substance by including sequences describing U.S. Department of Justice's modern crime-fighting methodology.

== Middle years at MGM ==
In 1935, Irving Thalberg, the highly regarded head of production at M-G-M, hired the comedy team The Marx Brothers, who had made five career-defining movies at Paramount Pictures, but whose dispute with Paramount over unpaid monies as well as the tepid box office of their now-classic "Duck Soup" (1933) resulted in their five-picture contract not being renewed. Thalberg, in offering them a film contract with M-G-M, demanded a significant degree of control over every aspect of the project. To this the Marx Brothers acquiesced. Zeppo Marx had left the team in 1934 to focus on other business ventures, leaving a trio consisting of Groucho, Harpo and Chico Marx.

Thalberg's decision to approach Wood to direct the Marx Brothers would mark a "turning point" in the director's professional career. Now in his late forties and "largely undistinguished" during the silent era (though exhibiting "unexpected moments of genius") Wood was regarded as one of M-G-M's "top men."

=== A Night at the Opera (1935) ===
Initially skeptical about undertaking A Night at the Opera, Thalberg assured Wood that a coherent film structure would be imposed to incorporate love interests and musical numbers, alternating with the Marx Brothers' comedy creations. Wood's masterful control over the screenplay and cast served to integrate these elements into the film. Historian John Baxter observes that:

Wood's handling the nihilistic Marx Brothers in A Night at the opera...is impeccable, perhaps because unlike other [directors] he does not neglect the supporting cast for the intervening musical and romantic sequences which Irving Thalberg considered necessary to the film's commercial success. Under Wood's direction, the Marx set-pieces do not come as high points in a dull landscape but arise naturally from the smooth fabric of the film.

Wood's "perfectionist" approach to shooting A Night at the Opera involved daily reviews of the footage and editing the scenes, a process that guaranteed reshoots that "endangered the spontaneity of the humor." Wood's often tedious approach to re-filming key Marx Brothers scenes placed a strain on cast and crew that Wood addressed with good-natured blandishments.

The enormous success of A Night at the Opera ensured that a sequel would be made, but Thalberg had declared a temporary moratorium in order to increase interest in the public for the anticipated feature. Wood was designated in advance as its director.

While M-G-M planned the next Marx Brothers comedy epic, Wood was occupied with a two-picture assignment. The first was Whipsaw (1936), a romance-crime drama with Myrna Loy and Spencer Tracy. The shooting included a brief clash between Wood and Tracy, the actor rebelling against the director for being "too meticulous". Wood's second effort was a "slick and glossy melodrama" with "M-G-M's stylish trimmings" with Loretta Young and Franchot Tone and a fine supporting cast: The Unguarded Hour (1936).

=== A Day at the Races (1937) ===
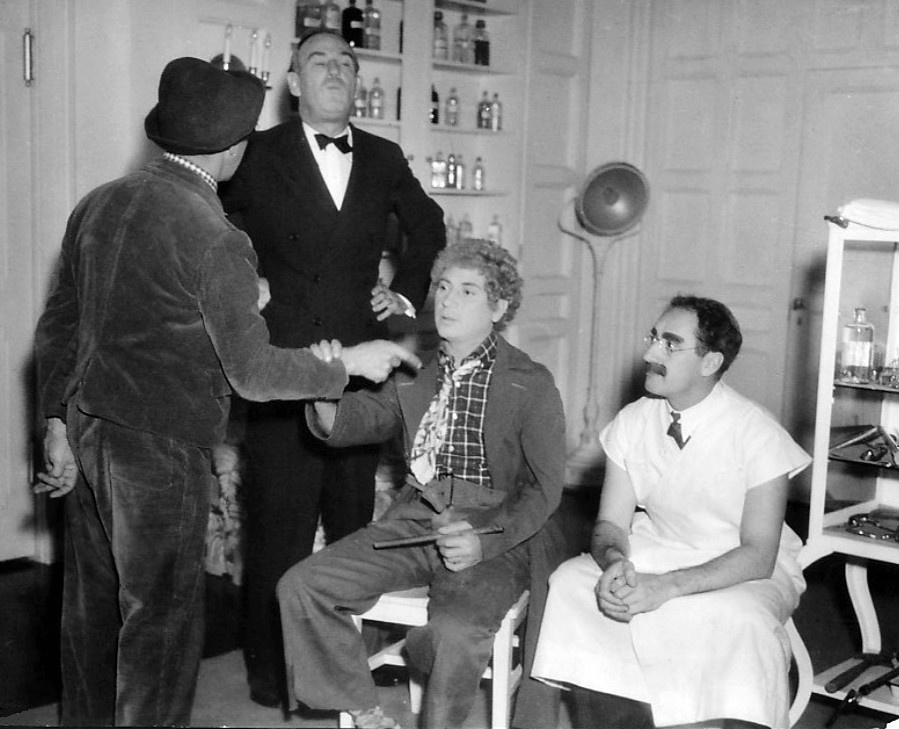
The Marx Brothers on the A Day at the Races set with Wood

While filming the Marx Brothers' A Day at the Races, Wood became exasperated by the brothers' lack of seriousness on the set:
Wood: "You can't make an actor out of clay!"
Groucho Marx (shouting back): "Nor a director out of Wood!"

The Marx Brothers arrived for the filming of A Day at the Races having tested new routines at burlesque venues, and Thalberg and Wood were prepared to use this material to emulate the profitability of A Night At the Opera. Shortly into the filming, Thalberg unexpectedly died, at thirty-seven, from pneumonia, a loss that left Wood personally shaken. Wood proceeded with the picture, adhering to the formula that balanced the "romance and musical numbers" with the fulsome humor offered in the Marx Brothers sequences.

== Final years at MGM ==
"If it isn't too good, keep it moving."—Director Sam Wood on his principles for Hollywood filmmaking.

After the success of his two Marx Brothers features, Wood requested and was awarded more substantial stories and scripts from M-G-M. Wood furnished the studio with "good pieces of entertainment" in his next four works "but nothing memorable".

Navy Blue and Gold (1937): Here Wood returned to collegiate athletics, endowing this "light comedy" - starring James Stewart, Robert Young and Tom Brown—with a "rousing" Army–Navy football game. Florence Rice provides the love interest.

Madame X (1937): A popular stage play by Alexandre Bisson that enjoyed numerous film adaptations until 1966, Wood directed Gladys George as the long-suffering mother who sacrifices for her children. Biographer Tony Thomas reports that the actress was one of the rare cases in which Wood developed a personal dislike for a player.

Lord Jeff (1938): A sentimental tale of orphan boys preparing for an apprenticeship in the British navy. Popular child actor Freddy Bartholomew undergoes correction by an older fellow orphan Mickey Rooney, with assistance from Peter Lawford.

Stablemates (1938): In Rooney's second appearance in a Wood film, a "race-track waif" he reforms the alcoholic yet good-hearted horse veterinarian Wallace Beery. Wood, in his handling of these inherently sentimental vehicles, avoids descending into "bathos", a temptation that "he avoided in all his films."

=== Raffles (1939) and Samuel Goldwyn Productions ===
A perennial favorite among filmmakers since 1904, Raffles is based on the popular short story "The Amateur Cracksman" (1899) by E.W. Hornung and filmed by director King Baggot in 1925, and Harry D'Arrast and George Fitzmaurice in 1930. Wood made the film while loaned out to Sam Goldwyn for this production.

Raffles' stars Olivia de Havilland and debuts David Niven as the gentleman jewel thief who good-naturedly thwarts Scotland Yard. Wood, like a number of his fellow directors, among them King Vidor, suffered from Goldwyn's intrusiveness on the set.

=== Goodbye, Mr. Chips (1939) ===
The film rights to British novelist James Hilton's popular novelette Goodbye, Mr. Chips were obtained by M-G-M's Irving Thalberg after literary critic Alexander Woollcott's praise for the work helped popularize it in the United States. Wood traveled to England to make Goodbye, Mr. Chips, the only professional sojourn of his career, part of an attempt by M-G-M to accommodate demands by British trade unions for a share of the lucrative American film exports market.

The novel spans the life of an English school master (Robert Donat) whose lonely and inhibited existence is transformed through the love of his understanding spouse (Greer Garson) into a good-natured pedagogue beloved by generations of his students. Wood's direction of Donat was painstaking in its precision, a role that required the actor to portray his character in youth and old age (in four stages, at twenty-four, forty, sixty-four and eighty-three years of age). Wood demonstrated his restraint in telling the inherently touching tale convincingly without lapsing into sentimentality.

Actress Greer Garson made her Hollywood debut with Goodbye, Mr. Chips. Just days before "the still uncast" actress was to return to Great Britain after M-G-M had withdrawn her film option, Wood by chance saw her screen test and quickly informed M-G-M that he wanted her to play the role of Katherine.

Goodbye, Mr. Chips won Donat a Best Actor Oscar, and Wood received the first of his three Academy Award nominations for Best Director. Upon his return from England, Wood determined he would end his long association with M-G-M, confident that he could thrive by offering his services independently to any of the major studios.

=== Gone with the Wind (1939) ===
Wood's parting assignment under M-G-M was to take over the filming of Gone with the Wind when the director Victor Fleming collapsed during shooting and did not return to the studio for a month. The film epic was based on Margaret Mitchell's popular novel set during the American Civil War. Fleming received screen credit for directing the film, though the precise contribution by Wood, as well as that of several other contributors, including George Cukor, Leslie Howard, David O. Selznick, and William Wellman has not been fully documented. A number of uncredited cinematographers also shared in making the picture, among them Joseph Ruttenberg, Wilfred Cline and Lee Garmes, who often worked "at first units located on widely separated locations".

Other than overseeing the vast operations at the movie's multiple venues, Wood with certainty filmed the entire sequence where Scarlett O'Hara (Vivien Leigh) shoots a Yankee bummer (Paul Hurst) who broke into the plantation household. Wood also personally handled some of the scenes that depict wounded Confederate troops at the Atlanta train depot. Whatever way the attributions are allocated, the collective efforts of the cast and crew produced "a remarkable film."

During the next 10 years until his death in 1949, Wood would direct and produce his most substantial work as one of Hollywood's major filmmakers.

== Our Town (1940) ==
Now operating as an independent agent, Wood was instantly offered the option by his former associate and producer Irving "Sol" Lesser to adapt Thornton Wilder's play Our Town. Wilder's Pulitzer Prize-winning play had first been staged on Broadway in 1938, and was "not the kind of vehicle that 1940 Hollywood would have been expected to produce", but Lesser was determined to bring the "unusual" qualities of the work faithfully to the screen.

Wilder worked closely with both Wood and Lesser to help preserve the qualities of the stage production by retaining narrator Frank Craven, who on-screen observes the lives of two rural families in New Hampshire near the turn of the 20th century. Lesser and Wood convinced Wilder to permit one major alteration in his allegorical play: Emily Webb, played by Martha Scott, does not die in childbirth, but only in a dream sequence, a re-write that Wilder admitted was preferable in a cinematic treatment of his work. The atmosphere of the picture was enhanced by the simplicity of the scenery conceived by set designer William Cameron Menzies and by the haunting musical score by American composer Aaron Copland. The excellent supporting cast, including Fay Bainter, Beulah Bondi, Thomas Mitchell and Guy Kibbee contributed to Our Town's nomination for the Best Picture Oscar.

=== Kitty Foyle (1940): Ginger Rogers ===
Based on a Christopher Morley story entitled "Kitty Foyle: The Natural History of a Woman", Ginger Rogers plays the working class protagonist who struggles to choose between two men in a love triangle.

Wood approached the filming of Kitty Foyle with immense care, delineating camera orientation, a precise script and "notes on interpretation" to achieve the "utmost clarity." However implausible the narrative of the love story, Wood maintained his signature control that balances the film's "tenderness and intelligence" with a firmness of direction that avoids sentimentality. The director was emphatic in his disdain for over-acting: "I find [over-acting] unforgivable because it destroys realism. I don't allow scenery chewing while emoting." Wood received the second of his three Academy Award Best Director nominations for Kitty Foyle and a nomination for Best Picture. Ginger Rogers won for Best Actress.

Wood returned to Paramount Pictures to make an action-packed Western that borders on a burlesque of the genre, Rangers of Fortune (1940). Starring Fred MacMurray and Gilbert Roland with supporting cast Albert Dekker and Betty Brewer. The madcap escapades of these desperadoes stop short of "buffoonery" when Wood applies his story-telling skills to assert his "sense of balance...one of the most valuable assets" that Wood possessed as a filmmaker.

=== The Devil and Miss Jones (1941): Jean Arthur, RKO Pictures ===
Wood opted for RKO Pictures to film Norman Krasner's original screenplay The Devil and Miss Jones, a comedy starring Jean Arthur and Charles Coburn. Frank Ross Jr., Arthur's husband, produced the picture. The stars delivered superb performances in a "social satire" that pits a department store saleswoman-cum-strike organizer (Arthur) against the Scrooge-like owner (Coburn). As with most of Wood's work, consistency, pace and balance characterized his expert handling of the story and script.

== A collaborative masterpiece: Kings Row (1942), Warner Brothers ==
After a protracted struggle to formulate a screenplay satisfactory to censors at the Hays Office, Wood and Warner Brothers commenced to film Henry Bellamann's grim and anti-nostalgic novel of American small-town life, Kings Row.

Wood's "discipline as a story-teller" was essential in conveying to the screen Kings Row's "troubling message without sacrificing its integrity."

The high quality of Wood's directorial performance was augmented by three of Hollywood's finest professionals in their fields: set designer William Cameron Menzies, cinematographer James Wong Howe and composer Erich Wolfgang Korngold, collectively creating a film of "classical proportions."

Biographer Tony Thomas offers this appraisal:

[I]t is Sam Wood who guided all these elements and molded them into a fascinating portrait of love, hate, madness, tragedy and happiness in the life of an American town around the turn-of-the-century. Kings Row will doubtless continue to be one of the prime choices of [cineastes].

=== The Pride of the Yankees (1942): Sam Goldwyn and RKO ===
When beloved baseball player Lou Gehrig of the New York Yankees died, aged thirty-seven in 1941 of ALS, a fatal neuromuscular disorder, Wood determined that a film biography was in order. The career of the "modest and likable" Gehrig spanned 17 years (1923–1939), during which he played more than two thousand consecutive games. Though Gehrig was idolized by his fans, Wood met with resistance from studio executives to a project that was likely to appeal to only half of the American demographic: male sports fans. Wood, an ardent sports enthusiast, was able to sway producer Sam Goldwyn to sponsor the film, and they both agreed that the picture would be an "ideal vehicle" for Gary Cooper, "a kind of idealization of the American male", and significantly, under contract to Goldwyn.

An avid outdoorsman, Cooper was virtually ignorant of baseball as a professional sport, but complied with his contract. Wood's encouragement and support for Cooper served to create a satisfactory portrayal of Gehrig, matching "the perfect actor with the perfect director" and assuring the film's success.

While filming on set, Wood was initially dismayed at what at first appeared to be Cooper's inept acting. Upon reviewing the actual footage, Wood was relieved and pleased to discover that Cooper's "underplaying" translated effectively to the screen.

Cooper was nominated for an Academy Award for Best Actor, and the film earned nine more nominations, including Best Picture. The Pride of the Yankees remains "one of the best and most popular screen biographies as well as the quintessential baseball movie."

Even as Wood was filming Kings Row for Warner Brothers in 1941, he began working on his major project for Paramount: an adaption of novelist Ernest Hemingway's For Whom the Bell Tolls. Wood proceeded to shoot numerous landscape scenes in the Sierra Nevada mountain range before the cast for the movie had been selected. Production on the film was set aside while Wood made The Pride of the Yankees; only when that project was completed did he return to For Whom the Bell Tolls.

== For Whom the Bell Tolls (1943), Paramount Pictures ==
Wood's 1943 For Whom the Bell Tolls was "the major project of [his] career." Adapting Ernest Hemingway's Spanish Civil War epic had a personal and political significance to Wood, identifying as he did with Hemingway's idealistic protagonist Robert Jordan and the Republican cause for which he fought.

Paramount Pictures' casting of the doomed hero was a foregone conclusion, as the book's author, Hemingway, had his friend and actor Gary Cooper in mind as Robert Jordan when he conceived the story. Cooper was conveniently already under contract with the studio. Wood was obliged to complete The Pride of the Yankees (1942) before he could commit himself fully to For Whom the Bell Tolls, already under production since late 1941.

Wood favored ballet dancer and actress Vera Zorina for the role of the young guerrilla fighter, Maria, an opinion that was at odds with Hemingway as well as members of "Wood's own family." During shooting on location, Wood realized his error when Zorina did not take to the part, and Ingrid Bergman, who had coveted the role, was auditioned after completing her role as Ilsa Lund in director Michael Curtiz's Casablanca (1942), and winning "the coveted role."

Audiences and critics felt "the love interest was over-played" in For Whom the Bell Tolls at the expense of clarifying the political issues that defined the Spanish Civil War: a brutal and violent struggle between fascist and anti-fascist forces.

Wood was undoubtedly disappointed when "the major project of his career" did not garner him an Academy Award nomination, an honor that was bestowed on his cinematographer Ray Rennahan, his set designer William Cameron Menzies, musical director Victor Young and his four leading cast members, with Katina Paxinou winning Best Supporting Actress in her role as the revolutionary matron Pilar.

Filmed shortly after the United States entered World War II, the government placed wartime limits on Hollywood's access to new building materials. To obviate these restrictions, Wood chose to do most of the filming outdoors at the picturesque Sonora Pass in the Sierra Nevada. Wood recalled the ordeal of filming For Whom the Bell Tolls:

I never experienced anything as difficult as filming under the conditions we had, at an elevation of ten thousand feet, scrambling over rocks. We even uprooted wildflowers and greenery to prevent the harsh landscape from becoming 'pretty' for the Technicolor camera and we substituted ancient, gnarled tree trunks instead. Due to the quartz and metallic content of the rocks, painters had to spray down the backgrounds of almost all the exteriors. Not only did we go to the mountains, but we painted it too.

Though For Whom the Bell Tolls did not achieve the critical success that Paramount had anticipated, Bergman and Cooper, who recognized the potential of their film pairing, followed Wood to Warner Brothers to star in a Western romance, Saratoga Trunk (1945).

=== Saratoga Trunk (1943, released 1945), Warner Brothers ===
Warner Brothers sought to exploit the "exciting potential" of a Bergman-Cooper pairing in Saratoga Trunk (1945), an "expensive and lavish" production that did not live up to expectations. (The "Trunk" refers to the Saratoga Trunk Line, owned by a railway baron played by John Warburton) Though filmed in early 1943, the picture was not given general release until early 1945, initially presented only to U.S. servicemen stationed overseas during the war.

Wood's direction of Saratoga Trunk lacked his characteristic celerity and its "languid" tempo earned the film only an "admirable but dull" rating by critics, despite its "rich production values." The director of Hollywood's Production Code Administration, Joseph Breen, registered some distaste for the characterization of Clio Dulaine (Ingrid Bergman) as a mixed-race (half-Creole) courtesan who seeks matrimony with wealthy white gamblers and capitalists. The only acting Academy Award nomination went to British actress Flora Robson, who wore blackface makeup to portray the mulatto servant Angelique Buiton.

A commercial failure, Saratoga Trunk did not diminish the mutual esteem which Cooper and Wood held for each other. Their next feature was decidedly not of the epic-heroic proportions of their three previous collaborations, but a light comedy: Casanova Brown.

=== Three comedies: Casanova Brown, Guest Wife and Heartbeat: 1944-1946 ===
Wood continued his collaboration with Cooper in a comedic vein after the delayed release of Saratoga Trunk with International Pictures' Casanova Brown (1944), a vehicle intended to appeal to female movie patrons. Cooper absconds with his own infant daughter from a maternity ward in order to prevent his former wife offering the child up for adoption. Wood's situation comedy was no more than a moderate success. Wood followed with Guest Wife (1946) starring Claudette Colbert and RKO's Heartbeat (1946) starring Ginger Rogers.

A cinematic "trifle" largely carried by the virtues of star Colbert, Guest Wife also benefits from Wood's expert handling of his cast, "a talent in itself." Biographer Tony Thomas summarizes Wood's approach to controlling his actors:

As a director Wood was especially good with actors…he never [regarded them] as puppets...each Wood filming began with a casual discussion with his players as to how they saw their parts. Frequently, with actors who differed with his own concept, he would shoot a scene both ways and later in the projection room, explain why his own handling was necessary to the construction of the film. Wood was the most diplomatic of dictators.

Wood rejoined Ginger Rogers after their success in the romance Kitty Foyle (1940) to film a remake of French director Henri Decoin's 1939 Battement de coeur, in Heartbeat. The Dickensian theme features Rogers as an Oliver Twist-like character who enlists to serve the Fagin-like figure (Basil Rathbone) as a pickpocket. The picture would have been better served if Wood possessed "the sly touch of a Guitry or a Lubitsch" rather than Wood's obvious humor.

== Last years ==
Based on a short story by Marie Belloc Lowndes set during Great Britain's Edwardian era, this 1947 melodrama is considered by some critics, but not universally, to be "a minor cinematic masterpiece." Wood's crime-noir stars Joan Fontaine as the "ruthless" and scheming social climber whose homicidal deed leads to her sordid demise.

Ivy was essentially a collaborative effort between director Wood and producer and renowned set designer William Cameron Menzies, who also served as producer on the picture. Wood and Menzies had worked splendidly on a number of projects including Gone with the Wind (1939), Our Town (1940) and For Whom the Bell Tolls (1943). The fine rendering of the British upper-class milieu is attributed largely to the uncredited Menzies, although screen credit went to Richard H. Riedel.

Photographed "lovingly" by cameraman Russell Metty, Fontaine's Orry-Kelly wardrobe reduced the actress to a "gorgeous artifact" and she complained later that director Wood neglected to develop the potential dramatic complexities of her character.

Biographer Tony Thomas sums of Wood's directorial effort on Ivy:

The film was strong on moods and mysteries and movement but there are those who felt that Wood was too obvious in his story telling, that more subtly on his part would have produced an even better film.

=== Command Decision (1949), M-G-M ===
An adaption of the William Wister Haines World War II drama published in 1947, Wood's portrayal of the "anguish of wartime aviation command" is "unembellished" by any combat footage and shows fidelity to the novel of the same name.

The film's depictions of the military establishment during wartime balances "the devious expediency and opportunism" inherent to high command with "the heroism and heartfelt concern among various militarists and politicians." The film's scenario offered Wood the ideal platform on which to demonstrate his "thoroughly masculine and no-nonsense style of filmmaking" delivered by an all-male cast who represented officers and men from the U.S. Army Eighth Army Air Corps, played by Clark Gable, Van Johnson, Walter Pidgeon, Brian Donlevy and Charles Bickford. Biographer Tony Thomas describes the picture as "fairly honest in revealing the almost dehumanizing function of operating a modern war machine."

A key sequence from the film, developed specifically for Clark Gable (who served as an air force combat officer during the war) and well-executed by Wood, portrays his character, Brigadier General K.C. Dennis, in his dramatic "talking down" of a crippled Flying Fortress attempting to land.

=== Sports biography redux: The Stratton Story (1949), M-G-M ===
Wood returned to his sports métier when he was tasked with directing the story of Chicago White Sox major league pitcher Monty Stratton. One of baseball's youngest and foremost pitchers, Stratton lost a leg to amputation after a hunting accident aged 26. Director Wood expertly recounted the athlete's struggle to adapt to the use of a prosthetic and return to professional baseball in the minor leagues. An inherently "maudlin" tale, Wood presented the events without succumbing to sentimentality: "it told a true story, and kept to the facts…"

Actors Van Johnson and Gregory Peck were considered for the role of Monty Stratton, but M-G-M settled on James Stewart, the actor Stratton himself felt would portray his life most effectively.

Contrary to conventional wisdom among Hollywood studio executives that sports features were "box-office poison", The Stratton Story was "the sixth-biggest theatrical draw of 1949 and Stewart's first bona fide hit since his return from World War II."

=== Ambush (1950), M-G-M ===
Sam Wood's directorial swan song was the adventure Western Ambush, filmed in 1949 and released in 1950 after Wood's unexpected death from a heart attack. A "Grade A" M-G-M production, it starred Robert Taylor as a hardened US Army Indian fighter and companion John Hodiak and adversary Chief Thundercloud:

...horses leapt and galloped, cavalrymen and Indians bit the dust in rapid order, and dozens of characters were shot, scalped or chased. Soldiers wiped out Indians and vice versa, and customers were well-satisfied.. Wood considered it just one last assignment. Unfortunately, it would be his last.

When Wood was arranging a production of No Sad Songs for Me, a Margaret Sullavan vehicle for Columbia Pictures, he was suddenly stricken by a heart attack on September 22, 1949, and died a few hours later in hospital.

== Political beliefs ==
Wood became a committed and ardent anti-Communist in the years that saw the rise of McCarthyism in the late 1940s. Wood first exhibited this political perspective in 1943, when he reduced much of the anti-fascist content of For Whom the Bell Tolls, saying "It would be the same love story if they were on the other side." In 1944, he founded and served as the first president of the Motion Picture Alliance for the Preservation of American Ideals, an organization that was "dedicated to seeking out and expelling those people it considered traitorous to American interests."

The organization, "formed of management and labor in the film industry," quietly lobbied the House Un-American Activities Committee to examine purported Communist elements in the movie industry, which they did in 1947. Wood had been keeping a black notebook in which he wrote the names of those he considered subversive. His daughter Jeane Wood said that his crusade "transformed Dad into a snarling, unreasoning brute." There was nothing in Wood's personal and professional demeanor during the course of his long career that anticipated the intensity of his anti-Communist rage which "disappointed some of his friends and greatly concerned his family."

Wood was a charter member of the Hollywood Republican Committee.

Shortly following a 1949 meeting of his Motion Picture Alliance in which he had protested against a liberal screenwriter who was suing the group for slandering him, Wood suffered a fatal heart attack. He had added a condition to his will: no one, including his children, could collect their inheritance until they filed legal affidavits affirming that they had never been Communists. Wood's daughter, actress K.T. Stevens, made these observations about her father's demise:

I think two things contributed to my father's death at sixty-five. One was the energy he burned up making Ambush on location; they were at an elevation of 9,000 feet for several weeks and Dad had never stopped... he was first up in the morning and the younger actors were amazed at the way he ran around all day. The second thing was politics. His [anti-Communist] anger was so deep he seethed with it and I believe it affected his health.

== Death ==
Wood died from a heart attack in Hollywood at the age of 66. His grave is located in Glendale's Forest Lawn Memorial Park Cemetery.

For his contribution to the motion picture industry, Wood received a star on the Hollywood Walk of Fame at 6714 Hollywood Boulevard on February 8, 1960.

Biographer Tony Thomas provides this eulogy:

Wood's death meant little to the public but it marked the end of a long and respectable film career. Wood had been in the business forty years and he had seen it grow from infancy to a major industry. Rarely did he show signs of brilliance yet he was never at any time less than thoroughly professional. The work is the man: Sam Wood was uncomplicated, self-assured, clear-minded and he enjoyed working. In so far as he understood it, he was a master of his craft.

== Depictions ==
Wood is played by John Getz in Jay Roach's Trumbo.

== Filmography ==
=== Silent era ===
- Double Speed (1920)
- Excuse My Dust (1920)
- The Dancin' Fool (1920)
- Sick Abed (1920)
- What's Your Hurry? (1920)
- A City Sparrow (1920)
- Her Beloved Villain (1920)
- Her First Elopement (1920)
- The Snob (1921)
- Peck's Bad Boy (1921)
- The Outside Woman (1921)
- The Great Moment (1921)
- Under the Lash (1921)
- Don't Tell Everything (1921)
- Her Husband's Trademark (1922)
- Her Gilded Cage (1922)
- Beyond the Rocks (1922)
- The Impossible Mrs. Bellew (1922)
- My American Wife (1922)
- Prodigal Daughters (1923)
- Bluebeard's 8th Wife (1923)
- His Children's Children (1923)
- The Next Corner (1924)
- Bluff (1924)
- The Female (1924)
- The Mine with the Iron Door (1924)
- The Re-Creation of Brian Kent (1925)
- Fascinating Youth (1926)
- One Minute to Play (1926)
- Rookies (1927)
- A Racing Romeo (1927)
- The Fair Co-Ed (1927)
- The Latest from Paris (1928)
- Telling the World (1928)
- So This Is College (1929)
- It's a Great Life (1929)

=== Sound era ===
| Year | Film | Nominations | Won | Academy Awards & Nominations |
|---|---|---|---|---|
| 1930 | They Learned About Women | | | |
| 1930 | The Girl Said No | | | |
| 1930 | The Sins of the Children | | | |
| 1930 | Way for a Sailor | | | |
| 1930 | Paid | | | |
| 1931 | A Tailor Made Man | | | |
| 1931 | The Man in Possession | | | |
| 1931 | New Adventures of Get Rich Quick Wallingford | | | |
| 1932 | Huddle | | | |
| 1932 | Prosperity | | | |
| 1933 | The Barbarian | | | |
| 1933 | Hold Your Man | | | |
| 1933 | Christopher Bean | | | |
| 1934 | Stamboul Quest | | | |
| 1935 | Let 'Em Have It | | | |
| 1935 | A Night at the Opera | | | |
| 1935 | Whipsaw | | | |
| 1936 | The Unguarded Hour | | | |
| 1937 | A Day at the Races | 1 | 0 | |
| 1937 | Madame X | | | |
| 1937 | Navy Blue and Gold | | | |
| 1938 | Lord Jeff | | | |
| 1938 | Stablemates | | | |
| 1939 | Goodbye, Mr. Chips | 7 | 1 | Nomination — Best Director |
| 1939 | Raffles | | | |
| 1939 | Gone with the Wind (replaced Victor Fleming for 24 days) | 13 | 8 | |
| 1940 | Our Town | 6 | 0 | |
| 1940 | Rangers of Fortune | | | |
| 1940 | Kitty Foyle | 5 | 1 | Nomination — Best Director |
| 1941 | The Devil and Miss Jones | 2 | 0 | |
| 1942 | Kings Row | 3 | 0 | Nomination — Best Director |
| 1942 | The Pride of the Yankees | 11 | 1 | |
| 1943 | For Whom the Bell Tolls | 9 | 1 | |
| 1944 | Casanova Brown | 3 | 0 | |
| 1945 | Guest Wife | 1 | 0 | |
| 1945 | Saratoga Trunk | 1 | 0 | |
| 1946 | Heartbeat | | | |
| 1947 | Ivy | | | |
| 1948 | Command Decision | | | |
| 1949 | The Stratton Story | 1 | 1 | |
| 1950 | Ambush | | | |
