= Rio (1939 film) =

1939 film by John Brahm

- Theatrical release poster
- Directed by: John Brahm
- Screenplay by: Aben Kandel; Edwin Justus Mayer; Frank Partos; Stephen Morehouse Avery
- Story by: Jean Negulesco
- Produced by: Joe Pasternak (uncredited)
- Starring: Basil Rathbone; Victor McLaglen
- Cinematography: Hal Mohr
- Edited by: Philip Cahn
- Color process: Black and white
- Production company: Universal Pictures
- Distributed by: Universal Pictures
- Release date: September 29, 1939
- Running time: 77 minutes
- Country: United States
- Language: English
- Budget: over $448,000 or $450,000

Rio is a 1939 American crime film directed by John Brahm and starring Basil Rathbone, Victor McLaglen, Sigrid Gurie, and Robert Cummings.

== Plot ==
French financier Paul Reynard (Rathbone) is sentenced to a ten-year term in a South American penal colony for bank fraud. His wife Irene (Gurie) and Paul's faithful servant Dirk (McLaglen) travel to Rio de Janeiro to arrange for Paul's escape. But once she's landed in the Brazilian capital, Irene falls in love with American engineer Bill Gregory (Cummings). After his escape Paul realizes that he's lost his wife forever to a better man. Seeking revenge, he prepares to shoot Bill in cold blood, but Dirk intervenes and kills Reynard instead.

== Cast ==
- Basil Rathbone as Paul Reynard
- Victor McLaglen as Dirk
- Sigrid Gurie as Irene Reynard
- Robert Cummings as Bill Gregory
- Leo Carrillo as Roberto
- Billy Gilbert as Manuelo
- Maurice Moscovitch as Old Convict
- Irving Bacon as 'Mushy'
- Samuel S. Hinds as Lamartine
- Irving Pichel as Rocco
- Ferike Boros as Maria (as Ferika Boras)

== Production ==
In July 1938 Universal announced the film would star Danielle Darrieux who they had under contract and who had made The Rage of Paris for the studio. In October Universal said James Stewart would appear opposite Darrieux in the movie and Joel McCrea would play a role intended for Stewart, Destry Rides Again. In January Hedda Hopper reported that Darrieux did not want to return because she did not like the script for Rio. In March producer Joe Pasternak insisted that no one else would play her role.

Darrieux's return from France kept being delayed so in June 1939 Sigrid Gurie was cast. Filming started 21 July 1939. It wound up in September.

Filmink said Cummings played "a less typical role, as a seedy drunk who finds redemption."

== Reception ==
The Los Angeles Times called it "a well made melodrama... Rathbone scores heavily... Cummings... received applause last night for his work. He should move a lot nearer the top after this performance."

The New York Times said it was "an unmistakable B buzzing like an A" due to Brahm's direction which built "characterization, avoiding the obvious wherever that is possible and digging beneath the externals for psychological elements of suspense and drama... a handful of exceptionally telling sequences... a character gallery of constant interest."
