= Heartbeat (1946 film) =

1946 film

- 1946 US Theatrical Poster
- Directed by: Sam Wood
- Written by: Michael Duran (writer); Max Kolpé (writer); Rowland Leigh (additional dialogue); Morrie Ryskind (adaptation); Hans Wilhelm
- Produced by: Raymond Hakim; Robert Hakim
- Starring: Ginger Rogers; Jean-Pierre Aumont; Adolphe Menjou; Basil Rathbone
- Cinematography: Joseph A. Valentine
- Edited by: Roland Gross; J.R. Whittredge
- Music by: Paul Misraki
- Production company: New World Productions
- Distributed by: RKO Radio Pictures
- Release date: May 10, 1946
- Running time: 102 minutes
- Country: United States
- Language: English
- Budget: $1.2 million

Heartbeat is a 1946 American romantic comedy drama film directed by Sam Wood and starring Ginger Rogers, Jean-Pierre Aumont, Adolphe Menjou and Basil Rathbone. It is a direct remake of the French romantic drama Battement de cœur, released in 1940. It was produced by the Hakim Brothers for distribution by RKO Pictures.

== Plot ==
Professor Aristide runs a school for pickpockets in Paris. He takes on pupils like Yves and young Arlette by testing their dishonesty. He takes Arlette even though she fails by only stealing an apple instead of money; she's a runaway from a reform school where she's supposed to stay until she turns 21.

Arlette decides to steal just enough to buy into a sham marriage to avoid the reform school. On her first try, however, a well-dressed man catches her lifting his stick pin and brings her to his fancy house. He is an ambassador. When Baron Dvorak arrives, the two agree to a scheme to take Arlette to a diplomatic reception posing as the baron's niece.

It's only when they arrive at the reception that Arlette is told that she is to steal the pocket watch of Pierre de Roche. She does so while they are dancing, but removes a picture of the ambassador's wife which is inside it. The ambassador is thrilled to find no picture in the watch as he had been worrying his wife might be growing tired of him and has Arlette slip it back into Pierre's pocket. Pierre insists on driving Arlette home and stops along the way to confess how much he likes her; he kisses her and gives her flowers from his garden before dropping her off at the baron's house and extracts the promise that she'll meet him at the train station the next day, as they are both (supposedly) going to Geneva, where she claims to attend boarding school.

Arlette then sneaks back to Aristide's school but is confronted by the suspicious master thief, who throws her out when his suspicions that she was freelancing are confirmed. She decides to say goodbye to Pierre at the train station and confesses everything. Although he is angry and misses his train, he ultimately insists that she stay the night at his house and prepares a guest room for himself.

The next morning, Pierre's penniless friend Roland arrives to stay while Pierre is in Geneva. Pierre arranges for Roland to sham-marry Arlette in exchange for 10,000 francs. In Geneva, however, he quickly becomes jealous and returns, only to find that Arlette and Roland have hired Yves as a butler and bought clothes he must pay for. Arlette first tries to mollify Pierre and then flaunts her presence when the ambassador's wife shows up. The woman storms out when she finds Arlette's photo in Pierre's watch, a trick that Pierre finds charming.

Pierre confesses to Roland that he is in love with Arlette, but Roland convinces him that his reputation would be ruined if he married her. However, Arlette gets cold feet and cannot go through with the wedding ceremony. Pierre refuses her attempts to make up and heads to another embassy reception. Yves explains the problem to Arlette, but the girl insists that the people whose opinion Pierre is worried about are themselves schemers, liars, and cheats and heads to the reception herself. Pierre has a final change of heart but returns to find her gone and races to the reception.

Pierre finds Arlette charming the minister and cuts in to ask Arlette to marry him. The baron agrees that gaining a niece is better than having her spill his and the ambassador's secrets.

Pierre and Arlette then have a grand wedding.

== Cast ==
- Basil Rathbone as Professor Aristide
- Ginger Rogers as Arlette Lafron
- Jean-Pierre Aumont as Pierre de Roche
- Adolphe Menjou as Ambassador
- Melville Cooper as Roland Latour
- Mikhail Rasumny as Yves Cadubert
- Eduardo Ciannelli as Baron Ferdinand Dvorak
- Mona Maris as Ambassador's Wife
- Henry Stephenson as Minister Tarvey

Bess Flowers, Eddie Hayden, Ivan Lebedeff, Louis Mercier and Torben Meyer appear uncredited.

== Soundtrack ==
- Ginger Rogers - "Can You Guess?" (Music and Lyrics by Paul Misraki and Ervin Drake)

== Bibliography ==
- Jewell, Richard B. Slow Fade to Black: The Decline of RKO Radio Pictures. University of California Press, 2016.
