= My Kingdom for a Cook =

1943 film directed by Richard Wallace

- Directed by: Richard Wallace
- Screenplay by: Harold Goldman; Andrew Solt; Joseph Hoffman; Jack Henley
- Story by: Lili Hatvany; Andrew Solt
- Produced by: P. J. Wolfson
- Starring: Charles Coburn; Marguerite Chapman; Bill Carter
- Cinematography: Franz F. Planer
- Edited by: Otto Meyer
- Music by: M. W. Stoloff
- Production company: Columbia Pictures
- Release date: August 31, 1943 (US)
- Running time: 81 minutes
- Country: United States
- Language: English

My Kingdom for a Cook is a 1943 American comedy film directed by Richard Wallace, which stars Charles Coburn, Marguerite Chapman, and Bill Carter.

== Plot ==
A visiting British emissary on a goodwill tour of the United States struggles to replace his long-standing cook when he is unable to join him on the journey.

== Cast ==
- Charles Coburn as Rudyard Morley
- Marguerite Chapman as Pamela Morley
- Bill Carter as Mike Scott
- Isobel Elsom as Lucille Scott
- Edward Gargan as Duke
- Mary Wickes as Agnes Willoughby
- Almira Sessions as Hattie
- Eddy Waller as Sam Thornton
- Ralph Peters as Pretty Boy Peterson
- Ivan Simpson as Professor Harlow
- Betty Brewer as Jerry
- Melville Cooper as Angus Sheffield
- Kathleen Howard as Mrs. Carter
- Charles Halton as Oliver Bradbury
- Andrew Tombes as Abe Mason
- Norma Varden as Margaret
- William Austin as Brooks
- Constance Worth as Auxiliary girl
- Reginald Sheffield as English reporter
- Sterling Campbell as British wing commander
- Ethel May Halls as Mrs. Mason
- Jessie Arnold as Mrs. Forsythe
