= The Adventures of Marco Polo =

1938 adventure film directed by Archie Mayo

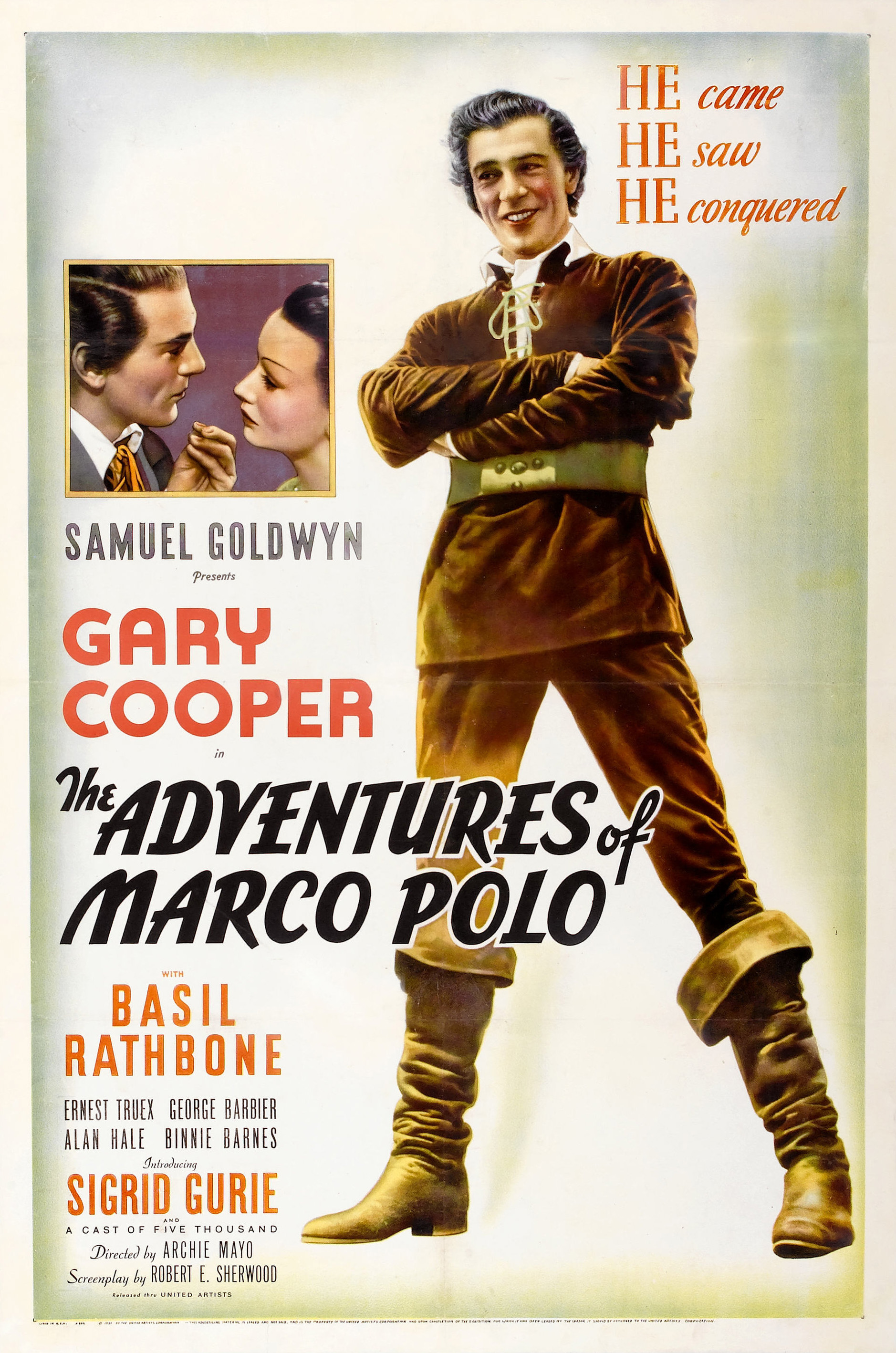
- Theatrical release poster by Norman Rockwell
- Directed by: Archie Mayo; John Cromwell (uncredited)
- Written by: N.A. Pogson
- Screenplay by: Robert E. Sherwood
- Produced by: Samuel Goldwyn; George Haight
- Starring: Gary Cooper; Sigrid Gurie; Basil Rathbone
- Cinematography: Rudolph Maté; Archie Stout
- Edited by: Fred Allen
- Music by: Hugo Friedhofer
- Production company: Samuel Goldwyn Productions
- Distributed by: United Artists
- Release date: April 7, 1938; (New York City)
- Running time: 100 minutes
- Country: United States
- Language: English
- Budget: $2 million

The Adventures of Marco Polo is a 1938 American historical adventure film directed by Archie Mayo and starring Gary Cooper, Sigrid Gurie, and Basil Rathbone. It was one of the most elaborate and costly of Samuel Goldwyn's productions.

== Plot ==
Nicolo Polo shows treasures from China and sends his son Marco Polo (Gary Cooper) there with his assistant (and comic relief) Binguccio (Ernest Truex). They sail from Venice, are shipwrecked, and cross the desert of Persia and the mountains of Tibet to China, to seek out Peking and the palace of China's ruler, Kublai Khan (George Barbier).

The philosopher/fireworks-maker Chen Tsu (H. B. Warner) is the first friend they make in the city, and invites them into his home for a meal of spaghetti. Children explode a firecracker, and Marco thinks it could be a weapon. Meanwhile, at the Palace, Ahmed (Basil Rathbone), the Emperor's adviser, harboring dubious ambitions of his own, convinces Emperor Kublai Khan that his army of a million men can conquer Japan.

Kublai Khan promises Princess Kukachin (Sigrid Gurie) to the King of Persia. Marco, arriving at the palace, sees Kukachin praying for a handsome husband. Marco is granted an audience with the emperor at the same time as a group of ladies-in-waiting arrive; Kublai Khan lets Marco test the maidens to find out which are the most worthy. Marco tests them all with a question ("How many teeth does a snapping turtle have?"), and he sends off the ones who had incorrectly guessed the answer, as well as those who had told him the correct answer (none), retaining those saying they did not know. His reasoning behind this is that they are the perfect ladies-in-waiting, not overly intelligent, and honest. Kublai agrees and Marco immediately becomes a favored guest. Ahmed shows Marco his private tower with vultures and executes a spy via a trapdoor into a lion pit. Kukachin tells Marco that she is going to marry the King of Persia, but, having fallen in love with her, he shows her what a kiss is. A guard tells Ahmed, who vows to keep Marco out of the way. Ahmed then advises Kublai Khan to send Marco into the desert to spy on suspected rebels. Kukachin warns Marco of the deceiving Ahmed.

== Cast ==
- Gary Cooper as Marco Polo
- Sigrid Gurie as Princess Kukachin
- Basil Rathbone as Ahmed
- George Barbier as Kublai Khan
- Binnie Barnes as Nazama
- Ernest Truex as Binguccio
- Alan Hale as Kaidu
- H.B. Warner as Chen Tsu
- Robert Greig as Chamberlain
- Ferdinand Gottschalk as Persian Ambassador
- Henry Kolker as Nicolo Polo
- Lotus Liu as Visakha
- Stanley Fields as Bayan
- Harold Huber as Toctai
- Lana Turner as Nazama's Maid
- Harry Cording as Officer (uncredited)
- Jason Robards Sr. as Messenger (uncredited)
- Charles Stevens as Mongol Warrior (uncredited)

== Reception ==
Contemporary reviews were mixed. When the movie premiered at the Radio City Music Hall, Frank S. Nugent of The New York Times wrote that "we could never forget for a moment that it was all make-believe," referring to the actors' accents which were clearly inaccurate for the film's time and place. However, he went on, "it is amiable make-believe, rich in the outlandish pageantry Hollywood loves to manufacture, facilely narrated and enjoyably played." Variety called the film "a spectacular melodrama" and "an excellent vehicle for Cooper" and inaccurately predicted that it would be a box office hit. Film Daily called the film a "thrilling, romantic offering" and called Cooper an "excellent" choice for the role. Harrison's Reports found "Expert performances" and a romance "handled in good taste," but found that its appeal would be limited to "sophisticated audiences" because it was lacking in action. John Mosher of The New Yorker called the film "a big disappointment" and described the dialogue as having "the swing of a bad libretto." Motion Picture Daily praised the "lavish" production but said the title role would have been much better suited to Rudolph Valentino than Gary Cooper. The New York Sun wrote, "In spite of its elaborate settings and the presence of Gary Cooper, The Adventures of Marco Polo never quite lives up to its promises."

In Italy, the fascist censors considered the film disrespectful to the eponymous hero and so it was released in 1939 under the title Uno scozzese alla corte del Gran Kan (A Scotsman at the Great Khan's court): the dub changed the protagonist to a Scotsman called MacBone Pan while Binguccio became Macniff, and several sequences at the beginning of the film containing explicit references to Venice were also eliminated. In 1951, the film was released in Italy with a faithful redub, translated literally as Le avventure di Marco Polo: the original characters were reinstated, and the previously removed sequences were restored.

The film was a box office flop, losing an estimated $700,000.
