= Wild Bill Hickok Rides =

1942 film by Ray Enright

- Directed by: Ray Enright
- Written by: Charles Grayson; Paul Gerard Smith; Raymond L. Schrock
- Produced by: Bryan Foy; Edmund Grainger
- Starring: Constance Bennett; Bruce Cabot; Warren William; Betty Brewer
- Cinematography: Ted D. McCord
- Edited by: Clarence Kolster
- Music by: Howard Jackson; Heinz Roemheld
- Production company: Warner Bros. Pictures
- Distributed by: Warner Bros. Pictures
- Release date: January 31, 1942
- Running time: 82 minutes
- Country: United States
- Language: English

Wild Bill Hickok Rides is a 1942 American Western film directed by Ray Enright and starring Constance Bennett, Bruce Cabot and Warren William. Bennett was paid $10,000 for her appearance, a significant drop from what she had recently been earning. Cabot is one of a number of actors to have played Wild Bill Hickok on screen.

== Plot ==
After her Chicago gambling hall burns down in the Great Chicago Fire of 1871, Belle Andrews accepts an offer from an ambitious businessmen Harry Farrel to accompany him to Powder River, Montana, to open a new casino. However, upon arrival, she becomes disgusted by his criminal activities and joins forces with Wild Bill Hickok to thwart his plans.

== Cast ==
- Constance Bennett as Belle Andrews
- Bruce Cabot as Wild Bill Hickok
- Warren William as Harry Farrel
- Betty Brewer as Jane 'Janey' Nolan
- Walter Catlett as Sylvester W. Twigg
- Ward Bond as Sheriff Edmunds
- Howard Da Silva as Ringo - the Prosecutor
- Frank Wilcox as Jim Martin - Ned's Lawyer
- Faye Emerson as Peg - Chorus Girl
- Lucia Carroll as Flora - Chorus Girl
- Julie Bishop as Violet - Chorus Girl
- Russell Simpson as Edward 'Ned' Nolan
- J. Farrell MacDonald as Judge Henry Hathaway
- Lillian Yarbo as Daisy, Belle's Maid
- Cliff Clark as Vic Kersey
- Trevor Bardette as Sam Bass
- Elliott Sullivan as Bart Hanna
- Dick Botiller as Sager
- Ray Teal as Beadle

== Bibliography ==
- Kellow, Brian. The Bennetts: An Acting Family. University Press of Kentucky, 2004.
- Rainey, Buck. Western Gunslingers in Fact and on Film: Hollywood's Famous Lawmen and Outlaws. McFarland, 2015.
