= A Racing Romeo =

1927 film by Sam Wood

- Directed by: Sam Wood
- Screenplay by: Byron Morgan
- Starring: Red Grange; Jobyna Ralston; Trixie Friganza; Walter Hiers; Ben Hendricks Jr. Warren Rogers
- Cinematography: Charles G. Clarke
- Production company: Robertson-Cole Pictures Corporation
- Distributed by: Film Booking Offices of America
- Release date: September 1, 1927
- Running time: 50 minutes
- Country: United States
- Language: English

A Racing Romeo is a 1927 American comedy film directed by Sam Wood and written by Byron Morgan. The film stars Red Grange, Jobyna Ralston, Trixie Friganza, Walter Hiers, Ben Hendricks Jr. and Warren Rogers. The film was released on September 1, 1927, by Film Booking Offices of America.

== Plot ==
Red Walden (Grange) and his friend Sparks (Hiers) are co-owners of a garage that is struggling financially. Trying to figure out how to save their business, the two decide to enter the Big Race, a cross-country event that promised a large prize money for the winner.

== Cast ==
- Red Grange as Red Walden
- Jobyna Ralston as Sally
- Trixie Friganza as Aunt Hattie
- Walter Hiers as Sparks
- Ben Hendricks Jr. as Rube Oldham
- Warren Rogers as Silas
- Ashton Dearholt as Motion Picture Director
- Marjorie Zier as Leading Lady

== Production ==
Director Sam Wood and writer Byron Morgan, who had previous success with motorsports films, approached American football star Red Grange about developing a movie during the football offseason. Interested in driving race cars, Grange accepted.

The film was shot at the fairgrounds in Ventura, California over five weeks. Although Grange wanted to perform the racing scenes himself, the crew hired Cliff Bergere as his stunt performer, with Grange doing the driving for close-up shots. Racers Freddie Frame, Babe Stapp, and Lou Moore also participated in production.

== Reception ==
A Racing Romeo struggled at the box office, which Grange speculated was due to poor promotion.
