= Sword of the Avenger =

1948 American adventure film directed by Sidney Salkow

- Theatrical release poster
- Directed by: Sidney Salkow
- Written by: Julius Evans
- Produced by: Sidney Salkow
- Starring: Ramon Delgado
- Cinematography: Clyde De Vinna
- Edited by: Mel Thorsen
- Distributed by: Eagle-Lion Films
- Release date: 1948
- Running time: 76 minutes
- Country: United States
- Language: English

Sword of the Avenger is a 1948 American adventure film directed by Sidney Salkow and starring Ramon del Gado, Sigrid Gurie, and Ralph Morgan.

== Plot ==
The setting of the film is the Philippines in 1827, while it was under Spanish rule. Roberto Balagtas (Delgado) is falsely arrested for treason and sent to prison where he is tortured. He escapes with other prisoners, but only Batagtas survives the escape, carrying with him a treasure map left by one of the others. He crosses paths with Ming Tang (Strong) and a group of Chinese smugglers, with whom he finds the treasure. The booty makes him extremely wealthy, and he changes his name to Don Diego Sebastian. He then goes back to the Philippines to seek his revenge.

== Cast ==
- Ramon del Gado (Rogelio dela Rosa) as Roberto Balagtas/Don Diego Sebastian
- Sigrid Gurie as Maria Luisa
- Ralph Morgan as Don Adolfo
- Duncan Renaldo as Fernando
- Leonard Strong as Ming Tang
