= Three Faces West =

1940 film directed by Bernard Vorhaus

- DVD cover
- Directed by: Bernard Vorhaus
- Written by: F. Hugh Herbert; Joseph Moncure March; Samuel Ornitz
- Produced by: Sol C. Siegel
- Starring: John Wayne; Sigrid Gurie; Charles Coburn
- Cinematography: John Alton
- Edited by: William Morgan
- Music by: Victor Young
- Production company: Republic Pictures
- Distributed by: Republic Pictures
- Release date: July 3, 1940
- Running time: 79 minutes
- Country: United States
- Language: English

Three Faces West is a 1940 American drama film directed by Bernard Vorhaus and starring John Wayne, Sigrid Gurie and Charles Coburn.

The film, mainly set in North Dakota was one of a handful of overtly anti-Nazi films produced by Hollywood before American entry into World War II. Isolationists and Nazi sympathizers condemned other Hollywood movies for being pro-British "propaganda" or for "glorifying war", however Three Faces West was deliberately crafted to celebrate the pioneer spirit of America, and the determination of Americans to survive the dust bowl, and contrasted these values with the evils of Nazism, thus preventing isolationists and Nazi sympathizers from being able to criticize the film as they had criticized other anti-Nazi films during this period.

Writing in the Journal of Austrian-American History, Jacqueline Vansant has argued that the film "takes a bold stand on contemporary issues through its Austrian-American romance."

== Plot ==
Two refugees, the Brauns, an elderly medical doctor and his 20-something-year-old daughter arrive in the USA from Nazi-controlled Austria.

They become a much-needed physician and nurse in a small North Dakota farm town. The town is located in the area later known as the Dust Bowl, and is being hit hard by the drought and resultant dust storms.

The local farmers and townspeople want to try to save their farms and the town by adopting new farming methods, but are eventually convinced by the Department of Agriculture, and the continuing dust storms to pack up the whole town and move en-masse to an undeveloped portion of Oregon. There a new dam is set to create a water supply, enabling them to build a new farming community.

In a then-contemporary version of an old wagon train, the town moves as a convoy of cars to Oregon, under John Phillips's leadership, not without differences of opinion and friction among the followers.

The doctor and his daughter take a detour to San Francisco when they learn that the daughter's fiance was not killed by the Nazis in Austria, but has instead come to America. However, the fiance has embraced Nazism, and their different ideologies now mean marriage is not possible. The doctor and his daughter rejoin the transplanted town in Oregon, where the daughter marries Phillips instead.

== Cast ==
- John Wayne as John Phillips
- Sigrid Gurie as Leni "Lenchen" Braun
- Charles Coburn as Dr. Karl Braun
- Spencer Charters as Dr. "Nunk" Atterbury
- Helen MacKellar as Mrs. Welles
- Roland Varno as Dr. Eric Von Scherer
- Sonny Bupp as Billy Welles
- Wade Boteler as Mr. Harris, Department of Agriculture Official
- Trevor Bardette as Clem Higgins
- Russell Simpson as Minister
- Charles Waldron as Dr. William Thorpe
- Wendell Niles as Man-on-the-Street Radio Announcer
- Francis Ford as Farmer Bill (uncredited)
- Byron Foulger as Joe Stebbins (uncredited)
- Mary Field as Mrs. Stebbins (uncredited)

== See also ==
- John Wayne filmography
