= Las Vegas Nights =

1941 film by Ralph Murphy

- Theatrical release poster
- Directed by: Ralph Murphy
- Screenplay by: Ernest Pagano; Harry Clork; Eddie Welch (additional dialogue)
- Produced by: William LeBaron
- Starring: Phil Regan; Bert Wheeler; Constance Moore; Virginia Dale; Lillian Cornell; Betty Brewer; Hank Ladd
- Cinematography: William C. Mellor
- Edited by: Arthur P. Schmidt
- Music by: Score: Phil Boutelje; Walter Scharf; Songs: Louis Alter; Burton Lane; Agustín Lara; Victor Jacobi; Harry Warren; Ruth Lowe; Sam Coslow; Arthur Johnston
- Production company: Paramount Pictures
- Distributed by: Paramount Pictures
- Release date: March 28, 1941
- Running time: 90 minutes
- Country: United States
- Language: English

Las Vegas Nights is a 1941 American musical comedy film directed by Ralph Murphy and written by Ernest Pagano, Harry Clork and Eddie Welch. The film stars Phil Regan, Bert Wheeler, Constance Moore, Virginia Dale, Lillian Cornell, Betty Brewer and Hank Ladd. The film was released on March 28, 1941, by Paramount Pictures.

This was Frank Sinatra's film debut; he appears briefly with the Tommy Dorsey Band singing "I'll Never Smile Again".

== Plot ==
Vaudevillian sisters Norma, Mildred, and Patsy, along with Patsy's husband, Stu, come to Las Vegas to turn an old building they inherited into a trendy nightclub. At a casino, the sisters win a tidy sum to fund their venture, but Stu loses it just as quickly. While taking out loans, they get mixed up with a scheming lawyer who wants their property for himself and they must fend him off to keep their new club running.

== Cast ==
- Phil Regan as Bill Stevens
- Bert Wheeler as Stu Grant
- Constance Moore as Norma Jennings
- Virginia Dale as Patsy Grant
- Lillian Cornell as Mildred Jennings
- Betty Brewer as Katy
- Hank Ladd as Hank Bevis
- Henry Kolker as William Stevens Sr.
- Francetta Malloy as Gloria Stafford
- William 'Red' Donahue as 'Red' Donahue
- Tommy Dorsey as Tommy Dorsey
- Frank Sinatra as Singer

== Music ==
The soundtrack features lyrics by Frank Loesser, Ned Washington and William LeBaron.

== See also ==
- List of films set in Las Vegas
