= Stablemates =

1938 film by Sam Wood

- Directed by: Sam Wood
- Written by: Richard Maibaum; Reginald Owen; Leonard Praskins; Wilhelm Thiele
- Produced by: Harry Rapf
- Starring: Wallace Beery; Mickey Rooney; Margaret Hamilton
- Cinematography: John F. Seitz
- Edited by: W. Donn Hayes
- Music by: Edward Ward
- Production company: Metro-Goldwyn-Mayer
- Distributed by: Loew's Inc.
- Release date: October 7, 1938
- Running time: 89 minutes
- Country: United States
- Language: English

Stablemates is a 1938 American sports drama film directed by Sam Wood and starring Wallace Beery and Mickey Rooney.

== Plot ==
Mickey is an orphan who works as a stable boy for Lady Q, a thoroughbred race horse with the potential to become a champion. Mickey's late father was a veterinarian and that is Mickey's goal also.

Tom Terry, an alcoholic drifter, moves into the stable, causing friction with Mickey. When Lady Q has a disappointing showing in a big race, her owner tells Mickey he is going to sell her to the glue factory. Instead, Mickey uses his meager savings to buy the horse. Mickey learns that Tom was once a distinguished veterinary surgeon. He tells Mickey that Lady Q has a tumor on her foot. Mickey convinces Tom to remove the tumor; the operation is successful and the horse recovers. The two then enter Lady Q in more races with Mickey as the jockey, which they win. Mickey and Tom grow close, prompting Mickey to suggest they "legally" adopt each other. Tom is reluctant, but soon agrees.

Mickey and Tom now plan to enter Lady Q in a big race. To earn the entrance fee, they start working at a farm owned by widow Beulah Flanders. When they have most of the money, Tom sends Mickey to the track to get an race application. While there, Mickey runs into detective Barney Donovan. Knowing that Tom as been with Mickey, Donovan tells the boy that Tom is wanted by law enforcement for his role in a fraudulent race that resulted in the death of a jockey and his horse. When Mickey returns to Buelah's farm, he pretends that he doesn't care for Tom anymore. Mickey strikes Tom and then leaves the farm with Lady Q.

The next day, Mickey gets the rest of the money for the entrance fee by impressing Mrs. Shepherd, a stable owner. However, Lady Q suddenly develops a sore hoof. Tom arrives at the track with a special shoe for the horse. Mickey finally confesses to Tom that he was afraid of him being arrested at the track and apologizes for his hurtful actions. Tom must leave the track to avoid arrest, but instead watches Mickey win the race. Although he now has enough money to attend veterinary college, Mickey is heartbroken when Donovan spots Tom and arrests him. Tom and Mickey have an emotional farewell, but Mickey is relieved when Mrs. Shepherd tells him that Tom will serve no more than a year in jail.

== Cast ==
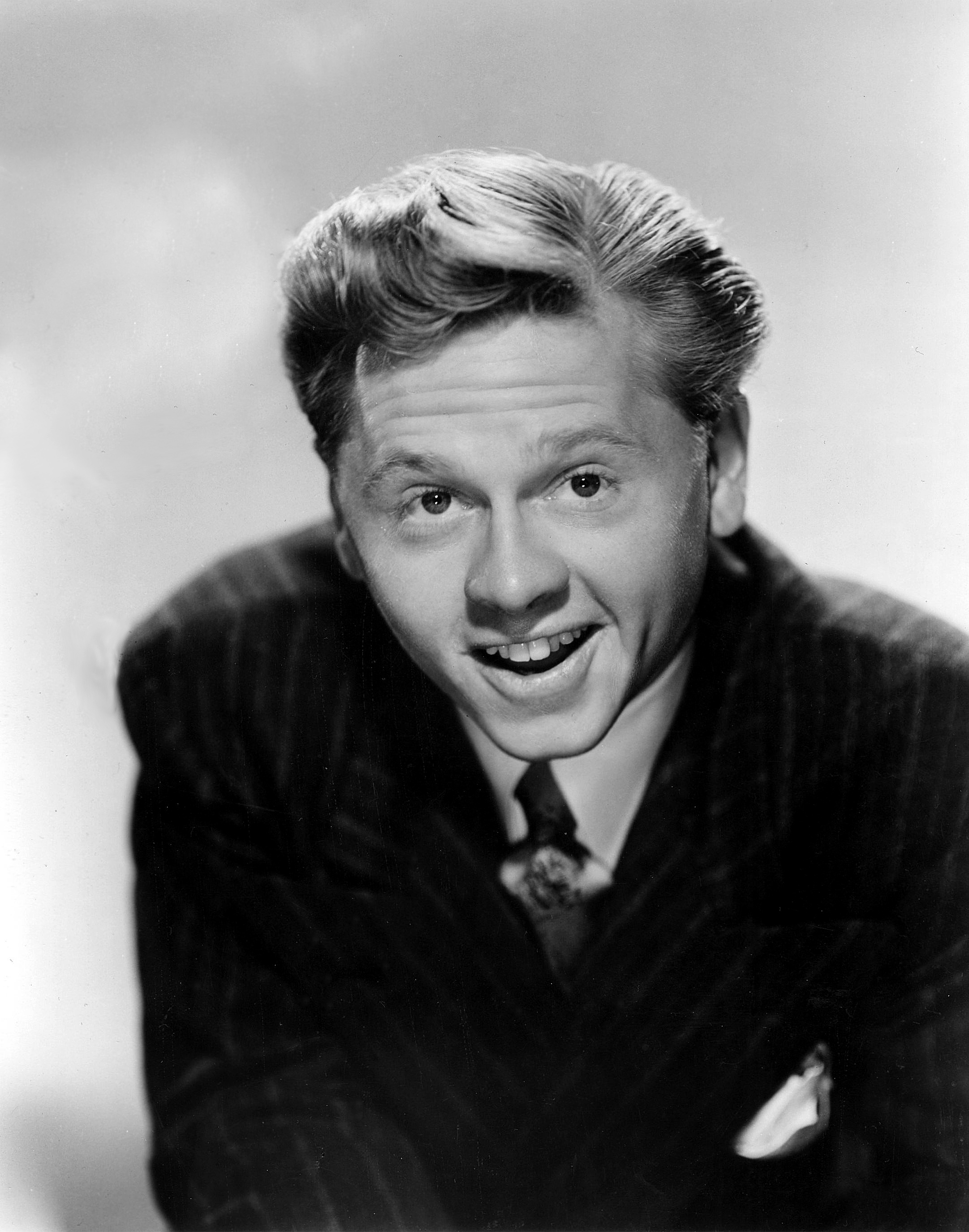
Mickey Rooney as Mickey

- Wallace Beery as Doc Tom Terry
- Mickey Rooney as Mickey
- Arthur Hohl as Mr. Gale
- Margaret Hamilton as Beulah Flanders
- Minor Watson as Barney Donovan
- Marjorie Gateson as Mrs. Shepherd
- Oscar O'Shea as Pete Whalen

== Production ==
Hollywood Park in Inglewood, California, was used for most of the race track scenes in Stablemates. The producers used race footage from the 1938 Hollywood Gold Cup race at that race track, which had been won by the famous thoroughbred Seabiscuit.

== Critical reception ==
Lionel Collier, wrote for the British magazine, Picturegoer,

"Young Mickey Rooney improves in every picture in which he appears. If only his directors would have a little more restraint when they direct him in his more lachrymose moments, he would be the perfect juvenile actor." Collier also commented that Wallace Beery was "in fine form."

== See also ==
- List of films about horse racing
- List of films about horses
- Filmology of Wallace Beery
