= Beyond the Blue Horizon (film) =

1942 film by Alfred Santell

- Theatrical release poster
- Directed by: Alfred Santell
- Screenplay by: Frank Butler
- Story by: E. Lloyd Sheldon; Jack DeWitt
- Produced by: Monta Bell
- Starring: Dorothy Lamour; Richard Denning; Jack Haley; Patricia Morison; Walter Abel; Helen Gilbert; Elizabeth Patterson
- Cinematography: Charles P. Boyle; William C. Mellor
- Edited by: Doane Harrison
- Music by: Victor Young
- Production company: Paramount Pictures
- Distributed by: Paramount Pictures
- Release date: June 25, 1942
- Running time: 76 minutes
- Country: United States
- Language: English
- Box office: $2 million (US rentals)

Beyond the Blue Horizon is a 1942 American adventure film directed by Alfred Santell and written by Frank Butler. The film stars Dorothy Lamour, Richard Denning, Jack Haley, Patricia Morison, Walter Abel, Helen Gilbert and Elizabeth Patterson. The film was released on June 25, 1942, by Paramount Pictures.

== Plot ==
Circus lion tamer Jakra and publicist Squidge are intrigued when they hear about Tama, a beautiful woman from Malaya who may be the rightful heiress to an American family's fortune.

To find proof of the claim, Jakra and his girlfriend go with Squidge and another interested party, Professor Thornton, to the Malayan jungle where Tama was raised. There they see her tiger, which can swim, and hear tales of a killer elephant responsible for many deaths.

Natives, expecting riches, turn against the visitors, but Tama's tiger comes to their rescue. They discover documents that prove Tama to be the legitimate heir to the fortune, then run from the rampaging elephant, which ultimately plunges off a cliff to its death.

== Cast ==
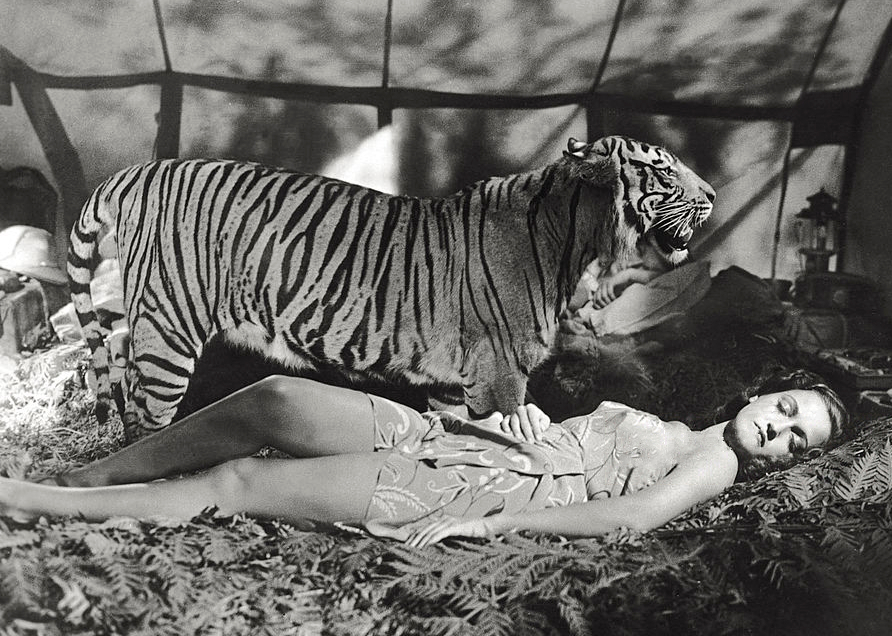
Dorothy Lamour in Beyond the Blue Horizon

- Dorothy Lamour as Tama
- Richard Denning as Jakra the Magnificent
- Jack Haley as Squidge Sullivan
- Patricia Morison as Sylvia
- Walter Abel as Prof. Thornton
- Helen Gilbert as Carol
- Elizabeth Patterson as Mrs. Daly
- Edward Fielding as Judge Chase
- Gerald Oliver Smith as Chadwick
- Frank Reicher as Sneath
- Abner Biberman as La'oa
- Charles Stevens as Panao
- Charles Cane as Broderick
- William Telaak as Willys
- Gogo as Gogo
- Ines Palange as the native nurse
