= Rangers of Fortune =

1940 film

- Theatrical poster
- Directed by: Sam Wood
- Screenplay by: Frank Butler
- Produced by: Dale Van Every
- Starring: Fred MacMurray; Albert Dekker; Patricia Morison
- Cinematography: Theodor Sparkuhl
- Edited by: Eda Warren
- Music by: Friedrich Hollaender (as Frederick Hollaender)
- Production company: Paramount Pictures
- Distributed by: Paramount Pictures
- Release date: September 27, 1940
- Running time: 80 minutes
- Country: United States
- Language: English

Rangers of Fortune is a 1940 American Western film directed by Sam Wood. The plot revolves around three heroes, played by Fred MacMurray, Albert Dekker, and Gilbert Roland, as they battle a ruthless land baron who is intent on driving out small ranchers and settlers. Patricia Morison co-stars.

== Plot ==
A firing squad in Mexico is just about to be the end of former Army officer Gil Farra, former prizefighter George Bird and caballero Antonio Sierra when they get a last-second reprieve.

Along the trail, riding for the U.S. border, the men encounter a young woman known as "Squib" and her grandfather, Homer Clayborn, a newspaper publisher. He's been run out of the town of Santa Marta, where townspeople have come under the thumb of a wealthy landowner, Colonel Rebstock.

Accompanying them back into town, the men decide to avenge Clayborn after he is murdered. They apprehend and jail the culprit, Todd Shelby, after scheming to get George named the town's new sheriff. Squib writes a newspaper editorial denouncing Rebstock, then is killed, with her office set ablaze. Shelby and his men bust out of jail, but Gil, George and Sierra overcome him, then do likewise with Rebstock.

== Cast ==
- Fred MacMurray as Gil Farra
- Albert Dekker as George Bird
- Gilbert Roland as Antonio Hernandez Sierra
- Patricia Morison as Sharon McCloud
- Betty Brewer as Mary Elizabeth 'Squib' Clayborn
- Joseph Schildkraut as Col. Lewis Rebstock
- Dick Foran as Johnny Cash
- Arthur B. Allen as Mr. Prout
- Bernard Nedell as Todd Shelby
- Brandon Tynan as Homer Granville Clayborn
- Minor Watson as Clem Bowdry
- Rosa Turich as Caressa
