= The Fallen Sparrow =

1943 film by Richard Wallace

- Theatrical release poster
- Directed by: Richard Wallace
- Screenplay by: Warren Duff
- Based on: The Fallen Sparrow; 1942 novel by Dorothy B. Hughes
- Produced by: Robert Fellows
- Starring: John Garfield; Maureen O'Hara; Walter Slezak; Patricia Morison
- Cinematography: Nicholas Musuraca
- Edited by: Robert Wise
- Music by: Roy Webb
- Production company: RKO Radio Pictures
- Distributed by: RKO Radio Pictures
- Release date: August 19, 1943 (US)
- Running time: 94 minutes
- Country: United States
- Language: English
- Box office: $1.5 million (US rentals)

The Fallen Sparrow is a 1943 American spy film noir starring John Garfield, Maureen O'Hara, Patricia Morison, and Walter Slezak. It is based on the novel of the same name by Dorothy B. Hughes. Nazi spies pursue an American, John "Kit" McKittrick, a Spanish Civil War veteran in possession of a priceless keepsake, who returns home to find out who murdered his friend. It received an Oscar nomination for Best Scoring of a Dramatic or Comedy Picture.

== Plot ==
Kit endured two years of brutal torture after being captured in the Spanish Civil War. However, he managed to withhold the vital information sought by his captors, particularly their leader, a never-seen Nazi with a limp. His lifelong friend, Louie Lepetino, arranged his escape. When Louie, a New York police lieutenant, dies under suspicious circumstances, Kit cuts short his convalescence in Arizona and returns to the city to investigate. At the end of the trip, he bumps into attractive fellow passenger Toni Donne.

When Kit goes to the police to find out what they know, Inspector Tobin tells him Louie's death was an accident, but Kit knows better. After arranging to stay in the apartment of another friend, Ab Parker, he begins to make the acquaintance of the various guests at the party at which Louie made his fatal plunge. Among them are noted Norwegian historian and wheelchair-using refugee Dr. Christian Skaas; his nephew, Otto; Kit's old flame, Barby Taviton, who hosted the ill-fated party; and Toni Donne. Also present were singer Whitney Parker, who is Ab's cousin, and her piano-playing accompanist, Anton. Kit is shaken when Dr. Skaas discusses the superiority of modern methods of torture over those of the past; it gibes too closely with what he endured.

Kit does not know whom to trust, but he is attracted to Toni, and she to him. However, it turns out that Toni was the only witness to Louie's fall, which raises Kit's suspicions. Meanwhile, Kit repeatedly hears, or imagines he hears, the man with the limp, suggesting that he may not be fully recovered from his ordeal.

When Kit returns to the apartment, he is attacked in the darkness. He manages to gain the upper hand, and when he turns on the light, he discovers his assailant is Anton. Anton reveals that Kit was allowed to escape from Spain, and that he has been watched constantly ever since in the hope that he would betray himself. Kit's brigade killed a general who was very close to Adolf Hitler. Hitler vowed to get all those responsible and to hang the brigade's battle standard on his wall. Kit knows where the flag is hidden.

The next morning, Kit is awoken by a gunshot. He finds Ab dead in the next room, shot through the head. Again, Inspector Tobin insists it must have been suicide. However, Kit knows that, because of a childhood accident, Ab was terrified of guns.

In front of key witnesses, Kit gives Toni a medallion from the battle standard, mounted in a necklace—a declaration for all to see that he knows where the flag is. Toni begs him to give up what she considers to be just a "dirty rag", but Kit is determined to foil the "little man" in Berlin.

In the end, Kit insists that she choose. She agrees to help him get into Dr. Skaas's office during another party. Kit knows the man with the limp will show up. But first, he has to drink a toast with Skaas. Previously, when drinking with the doctor, Kit switched their goblets, joking about an "old Borgia custom". He repeats the gesture, but Skaas is prepared: His own drink is drugged. While Kit searches the office, he hears the man with a limp. The door opens, and Skaas walks in, dragging one leg. Skaas taunts Kit with the truth: Otto killed Lepetino (who was investigating the Skaases for the Federal Government), he himself murdered Ab—and Kit has been drugged. However, Kit manages to shoot and kill the doctor and summon help before losing consciousness.

Toni explains that her 3-year-old daughter is being held hostage. Kit lets her go and arranges to meet her in Chicago.

Kit tells Tobin he plans to go to Lisbon to retrieve the flag and hand it over to “some of the boys.” “Brigades will be forming again.” Tobin asks if Kit is sure about Toni...

Cut to Kit and Tobin watching as Toni boards the Lisbon Clipper. On board, Kit stops her explanations, saying, “ I wish there were a little girl.”

“Another sparrow fell,” Kit says, watching as police take her away.

== Cast ==
- John Garfield as John "Kit" McKittrick
- Maureen O'Hara as Toni Donne
- Walter Slezak as Dr. Christian Skaas
- Patricia Morison as Barby Taviton
- Martha O'Driscoll as Whitney Parker
- Bruce Edwards as Ab Parker
- John Banner as Anton
- John Miljan as Inspector Tobin
- Hugh Beaumont as Otto Skaas

== Reception ==
The film earned a profit of $0.7 million, on rentals of $1.5 million.

On August 20, 1943, The New York Times observed: “As the story of an extraordinary conflict between a group of Nazi agents and a onetime Spanish Loyalist volunteer whose sanity has been wrenched by their tortures, it is a far-from-flawless film….But by virtue of a taut performance by John Garfield in the central role, and the singular skill with which director Richard Wallace has highlighted the significant climaxes, The Fallen Sparrow emerges as one of the uncommon and provocatively handled melodramas of recent months….What lifts the film above the merely far-fetched and macabre is largely the skill with which Director Wallace has used both soundtrack and camera to suggest the stresses upon the volunteer's fear-drenched mind. A street lamp shining through a fire escape throws a lattice across a sweating face; in a shadowy room, the remembered footsteps mingle with the tinkle of a bell and become the sound of dripping water from a leaking faucet. And again, when the climax is being quietly prepared at a refugee gathering in a mansion, the strident strains and swirling skirts of a gypsy dance brush momentarily across the silence between the warring opponents.Through these scenes and others Mr. Garfield remains almost constantly convincing and without his sure and responsive performance in a difficult role Mr. Wallace's effects would have been lost entirely. “

In The Nation in 1943, critic James Agee stated, " ... excellent lighting, good camera work, and unusually good bit-casting have added so much edge and vitality that The Fallen Sparrow passes among many people for the almost-Hitchcock spy melodrama it certainly is not. Otherwise, the show is no harm and no special good, about the speed of second-best Pocket Book mysteries."

In 2004, film critic Dennis Schwartz gave the film a mostly positive review, writing, "Though the plot is dubious, the suspense mounts as Garfield goes after the heavies and finds himself enmeshed in a fight for survival with the ruthless Nazis. If the plot wasn't so vague, this could have been a lot better psychological thriller. Garfield is grand as the intense war vet, who has been psychologically scarred by the war."
