= Betty Brewer =

American actress

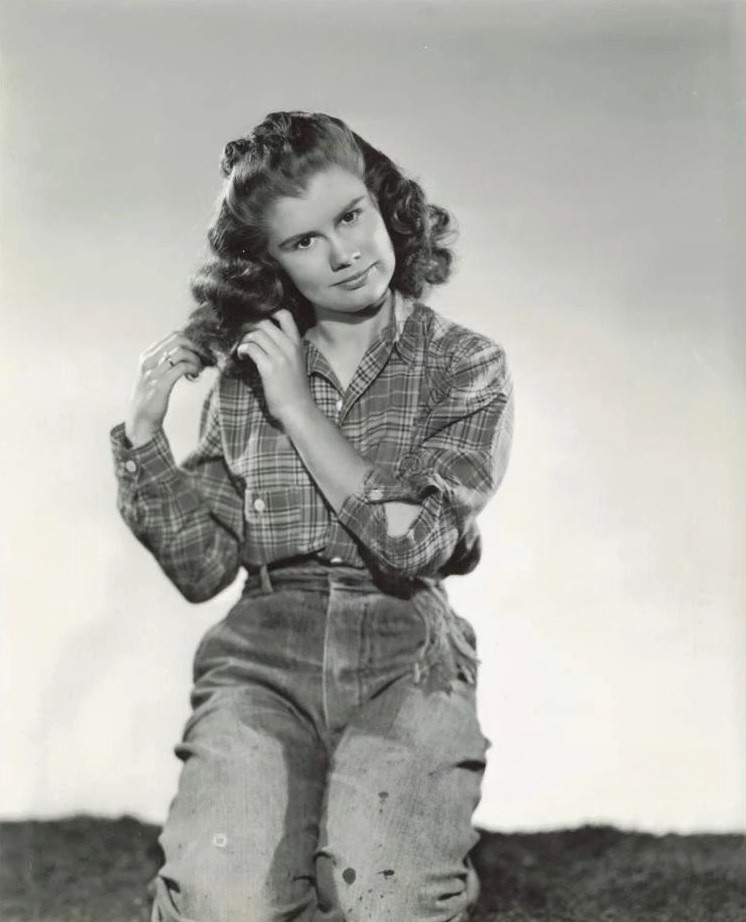
- Brewer in 1941
- Born: Virginia Brewer; November 23, 1923; November 23, 1924 or January 17, 1927; Joplin, Missouri, U.S.
- Died: December 2, 2006 (aged 79–83); Oakland, California, U.S.
- Occupation: Actress
- Years active: 1940–1944
- Spouse: Robert A. Hester (m. 1944)

Virginia Luella Brewer (November 23 or January 17, 1920s – December 2, 2006), known professionally as Betty Brewer, was an American actress.

Brewer was born in Joplin, Missouri, but her date of birth is a cause for some dispute, with some sources stating November 23, 1923, or 1924, and others claiming January 17, 1927. She made her film debut in Rangers of Fortune (1940).

She died in Oakland, California in December 2006.

== Selected filmography ==
- Rangers of Fortune (1940)
- The Round Up (1941)
- Las Vegas Nights (1941)
- Mrs. Wiggs of the Cabbage Patch (1942)
- Wild Bill Hickok Rides (1942)
- Juke Girl (1942)
- My Kingdom for a Cook (1943)
