= Sofia (1948 film) =

1948 film by John Reinhardt

- Directed by: John Reinhardt
- Written by: Frederick Stephani
- Produced by: Robert Presnell Sr. John Reinhardt
- Starring: Gene Raymond; Sigrid Gurie; Patricia Morison
- Cinematography: William H. Clothier
- Music by: Raúl Lavista
- Production company: Arpi Productions
- Distributed by: Film Classics
- Release date: September 3, 1948
- Running time: 82 minutes
- Country: United States
- Language: English

Sofia is a 1948 American thriller film directed by John Reinhardt and starring Gene Raymond, Sigrid Gurie and Patricia Morison. It is an early Cold War thriller set partly in the Bulgarian capital Sofia. The film was shot on location in Mexico and at the Estudios Churubusco in Mexico City. Made in Cinecolor, it was released by the low-budget company Film Classics. The film's sets were designed by the art director Alfred Ybarra. It got a British release the following year, where it was handled by Associated British Film Distributors.

== Cast ==
- Gene Raymond as Steve Roark
- Sigrid Gurie as Linda Carlson
- Patricia Morison as Magda Onescu
- Mischa Auer as Ali Imagu
- John Wengraf as Peter Goltzen
- George Baxter as James Braden
- Charles Rooner as Dr. Stoyan
- Fernando Wagner as Dr. Erik Viertel
- Luz Alba as Ana Sokolova
- Egon Zappert as Marow—Sokolova's Henchman
- Hamil Petroff as Dmitri—Bell Captain
- Peter O'Crotty as Brother Johannes
- John Kelly as Lt. Comdr. Stark
- Chel López as Ivan Chodorov
- José Torvay as Warden at Jail

== Bibliography ==
- Shapiro, Jerome F. Atomic Bomb Cinema: The Apocalyptic Imagination on Film. Routledge, 2013.
