= The Round Up (1941 film) =

1941 film by Lesley Selander

- Theatrical release poster
- Directed by: Lesley Selander
- Screenplay by: Harold Shumate
- Produced by: Harry Sherman
- Starring: Richard Dix; Patricia Morison; Preston Foster; Don Wilson; Ruth Donnelly; Douglass Dumbrille
- Cinematography: Russell Harlan
- Edited by: Carroll Lewis; Sherman A. Rose
- Music by: Victor Young; John Leipold
- Production company: Paramount Pictures
- Distributed by: Paramount Pictures
- Release date: April 4, 1941
- Running time: 90 minutes
- Country: United States
- Language: English

The Round Up is a 1941 American Western film directed by Lesley Selander and written by Harold Shumate. The film stars Richard Dix, Patricia Morison, Preston Foster, Don Wilson, Ruth Donnelly, Jerome Cowan and Douglass Dumbrille. The film was released on April 4, 1941, by Paramount Pictures.

It is a remake of the 1920 silent film The Round-Up, and is noteworthy for casting Wilson (best known as Jack Benny's announcer) in a rare dramatic role as the tubby sheriff originally played by Roscoe Arbuckle.

== Plot ==
At Janet Allen's wedding to Steve Payson, owner of the Sweetwater Cattle Ranch, her former fiancée Greg Lane, whom she thought dead, turns up. Greg disregards the fact she is now a married woman and tries to have sex with her behind her husband's back.

Soon, on the Sweetwater ranch, against a background of Indian uprisings, rustlers, gun-running and bandits, the young bride is torn between loyalty to her husband and a burning love for her returned sweetheart.

== Cast ==
- Richard Dix as Steve Payson
- Patricia Morison as Janet Allen (Payson)
- Preston Foster as Greg Lane
- Don Wilson as Sheriff 'Slim' Hoover
- Ruth Donnelly as Polly Hope
- Douglass Dumbrille as Capt. Bob Lane
- Jerome Cowan as Wade McGee
- Betty Brewer as Mary
- Morris Ankrum as 'Parenthesis'
- Dick Curtis as Ed Crandall
- William Haade as Frane Battles
- Clara Kimball Young as Mrs. Wilson
- Weldon Heyburn as 'Cheyenne'
- Lane Chandler as Taggert
- Lee 'Lasses' White as Sam Snead

== Bibliography ==
- Fetrow, Alan G. Feature Films, 1940-1949: a United States Filmography. McFarland, 1994.
