= Patricia Morison =

American stage, television and film actress (1915–2018)

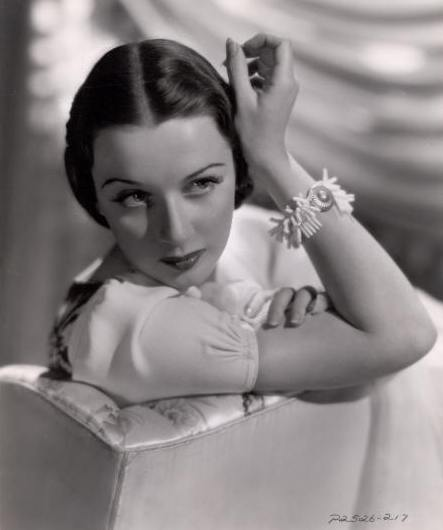
- Patricia Morison publicity picture in 1939
- Born: Eileen Patricia Augusta; Fraser Morison; March 19, 1915; New York City, U.S.
- Died: May 20, 2018 (aged 103); Los Angeles, California, U.S.
- Education: Art Students League of New York
- Occupations: Actress, singer, artist
- Years active: 1933–1989
- Notable work: Kiss Me, Kate; The King and I

Eileen Patricia Augusta Fraser Morison (March 19, 1915 – May 20, 2018) was an American stage, television and film actress of the Golden Age of Hollywood and mezzo-soprano singer. She made her feature film debut in 1939 after several years on the stage, and amongst her most renowned were The Fallen Sparrow, Dressed to Kill opposite Basil Rathbone and the screen adaptation of The Song of Bernadette. She was lauded as a beauty with large blue eyes and extremely long, dark hair. During this period of her career, she was often cast as the femme fatale or "other woman". It was only when she returned to the Broadway stage that she achieved her greatest success as the lead in the original production of Cole Porter's Kiss Me, Kate and subsequently in The King and I.

== Early life ==
=== Background ===
Eileen Patricia Augusta Fraser Morison was born in Manhattan on March 19, 1915, although some sources have erroneously given her year of birth as 1914.

Her father William was a playwright and actor from Belfast while her mother, Selena Morison (née Fraser), worked for British Intelligence during World War I. After graduating from Washington Irving High School in New York, Morison studied at the Arts Students League while taking acting classes at the Neighborhood Playhouse. She also studied dance under Martha Graham. During this time she was employed as a dress shop designer at Russeks department store in Manhattan in New York City.

=== First stage appearances ===
In 1938, Morison appeared in the musical The Two Bouquets, which ran for only 55 performances. Among the other cast members was Alfred Drake, who, years later, would star opposite Morison in the Broadway hit Kiss Me, Kate.

== Film career ==
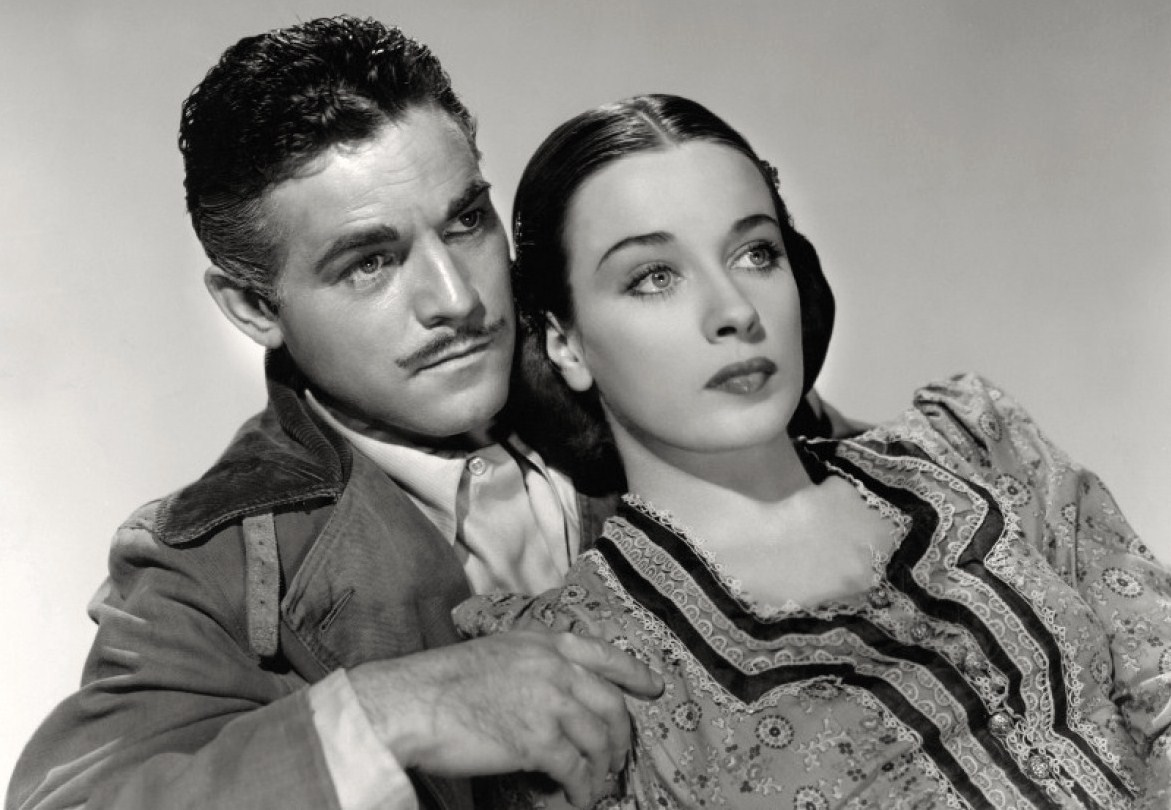
Alan Curtis and Patricia Morison in Hitler's Madman (1943)

=== Paramount contract player ===
While appearing in The Two Bouquets, Morison was noticed by talent scouts from Paramount Pictures, who were looking for exotic, dark-haired glamorous types similar to Dorothy Lamour, one of their star commodities. Morison subsequently signed a contract with Paramount. She made her feature film debut in the "B" film Persons in Hiding (1939). Also in 1939, Paramount considered her for the role of Isobel in their adventure film Beau Geste, starring Gary Cooper and Ray Milland, but the role instead went to Susan Hayward. The following year she appeared opposite Milland in the Technicolor romance Untamed, a remake of the Clara Bow vehicle, Man Trap (1926).

Despite Morison's promising beginnings, she was assigned to several second-tier pictures such as Rangers of Fortune (1940) and One Night in Lisbon (1941), both with Fred MacMurray, and The Round Up (1941) with Richard Dix and Preston Foster. On a loan-out to 20th Century-Fox she played one of her first villainess roles in Romance of the Rio Grande (1941), which starred Cesar Romero as the Cisco Kid. She left Paramount after a series of unrewarding roles, such as Night in New Orleans (1942), Beyond the Blue Horizon (1942), and Are Husbands Necessary? (1942). She was reportedly dropped from The Glass Key (1942) due to her towering over her co-star Alan Ladd.

=== USO tour ===
By 1942, the United States had become involved in World War II and, as a result, Morison became one of many celebrities who entertained American troops and their allies. In November of that year she joined Al Jolson, Merle Oberon, Allen Jenkins, and Frank McHugh on a USO Tour in Great Britain.

=== Return to film ===
Morison returned to acting in the cinema as a freelance performer. One of her better roles—albeit a small supporting one—was that of Empress Eugénie in The Song of Bernadette (1943) starring Jennifer Jones. She appeared in The Fallen Sparrow (1943) with John Garfield and Maureen O'Hara, and Calling Dr. Death (1945), one of the "Inner Sanctum" films, starring Lon Chaney Jr.

==== Allah Be Praised! ====
In 1944, Morison briefly abandoned her film work and returned to the Broadway stage. In April, she opened at the Adelphi Theatre in the musical comedy, Allah Be Praised!. The play, however, was unsuccessful and closed after a very brief run of only 20 performances.

=== More cinematic roles ===
Returning to films once again, Morison continued to be cast in supporting roles, all too often as femme fatales or unsympathetic "other women", including the Spencer Tracy-Katharine Hepburn vehicle, Without Love (1945), and the Deanna Durbin comedy-mystery Lady on a Train (1945).

She played formidably villainous roles in the final installments of Universal's Sherlock Holmes series and MGM's The Thin Man series—respectively, Dressed to Kill (1946), and Song of the Thin Man (1947). She played the female antagonist in Tarzan and the Huntress (1947), the penultimate film starring Johnny Weissmuller as Edgar Rice Burroughs' title character.

Her few leading roles during this time were in "B" pictures, notably as Maid Marian opposite Jon Hall's Robin Hood in the Cinecolor production The Prince of Thieves (1947) for Columbia, then did two films for Robert Lippert, the action film Queen of the Amazons (1947) with Richard Arlen, and the sepia-toned western The Return of Wildfire (1948). She played the role of Victor Mature's despairing, suicide-driven wife in Kiss of Death (1947). Her role was cut from the final print, over censorship concerns and the producers' reputed belief that audiences at that time were not ready for a scene depicting suicide. Morison also starred in a 1948 espionage film shot in Mexico, Sofia.

After a long absence from the screen, Morison portrayed George Sand in the 1960 Franz Liszt biopic, Song Without End.

== Broadway ==
=== Kiss Me, Kate ===
Excerpts from the 1949 Original Cast Recording of Kiss Me, Kate:
"Wunderbar"
Fred (Alfred Drake) and Lili (Patricia Morison) remember their early days together.

In 1948, Morison again abandoned her film career and returned to the stage, and achieved her greatest success. Cole Porter had heard her sing while in Hollywood and decided that she had the vocal expertise and feistiness to play the female lead in his new show, Kiss Me, Kate. Morison went on to major Broadway stardom when she created the role of Lilli Vanessi, the imperious stage diva whose own volatile personality coincided with that of her onstage role (Kate from The Taming of the Shrew). Kiss Me, Kate featured such songs as "I Hate Men," "Wunderbar", and "So in Love", reuniting Morison with her former Broadway co-star Alfred Drake. The play ran on Broadway from December 30, 1948, until July 28, 1951, for a total of 1,077 performances. Morison also played in the London production of Kiss Me, Kate, which ran for 400 performances.

=== The King and I ===
In February 1954, Morison took over the role of Anna Leonowens in the Rodgers and Hammerstein production of The King and I, which co-starred Yul Brynner in his star-making role as the King of Siam. The musical premiered in 1951, originally with Gertrude Lawrence as Leonowens. Lawrence was subsequently replaced by Celeste Holm, Constance Carpenter, Annamary Dickey, and finally Morison, who appeared in The King and I until its Broadway closing on March 20, 1954, and then continued with the production on the national tour, which included a stop at the Los Angeles Civic Light Opera (from May 5, 1954). She played the role at the Municipal Theatre in St. Louis, Missouri; the production opened on June 11, 1959.

== Television ==
=== Television appearances ===
During the 1950s and 1960s, Morison made several appearances on television, including several variety shows. Among these were a production of Rio Rita on Robert Montgomery Presents (1950) and a segment from The King and I on a 1955 broadcast of The Toast of the Town starring Ed Sullivan. She also appeared in 1952 on the Christmas Party episode of the Honeymooners segment of Jackie Gleason's show playing herself as Trixie Norton's former Vaudevillian friend. Morison also appeared in General Foods 25th Anniversary Show: A Salute to Rodgers and Hammerstein broadcast March 28, 1954 on all four American TV networks of the time.

Morison and Alfred Drake recreated their Kiss Me, Kate roles in a Hallmark Hall of Fame production of the play broadcast in color on November 20, 1958. She also appeared with Howard Keel in a production of Kiss Me, Kate on British television in 1964. In 1971 she and Yul Brynner performed "Shall We Dance" from The King and I on a broadcast of the Tony Awards.

She is featured in the 2017 television documentary If You're Not in the Obit, Eat Breakfast.

=== Character roles ===
Among her non-musical television performances were a recurring role on the detective series The Cases of Eddie Drake (1952) co-starring Don Haggerty on the DuMont Television Network and a guest appearance with Vincent Price on Have Gun – Will Travel (1958) starring Richard Boone. Years later she appeared in the made-for-TV movie Mirrors (1985) and a guest role in 1989 on the popular sitcom Cheers.

== Last stage and film appearances ==
I used to think every night before I went on stage, a lot of people think of the audience as one mass, but it's not—it's all individual people. And that's why I love the theater ... And I always feel that if in some way you can touch somebody, either touch them emotionally, or if it's a young person who wants to be an actor, touch them so he or she, too, wants to be an actor ... it's so worthwhile. I've enjoyed everything I've done in life.

— Patricia Morison

Throughout the 1960s and 1970s, Morison performed on stage numerous times—largely in stock and touring productions. These included both musical and dramatic plays, among them Milk and Honey, Kismet, The Merry Widow, Song of Norway, Do I Hear a Waltz?, Bell, Book and Candle, The Fourposter, Separate Tables, and Private Lives.

She performed in still more productions of Kiss, Me Kate at the Seattle Opera House (opening in April 1965) and the New York City Center (opening May 12, 1965).

In August 1972, she appeared in a production of The Sound of Music at the Dorothy Chandler Pavilion in Los Angeles.

In November 1978 she again played the leading role in Kiss Me, Kate at the Birmingham Repertory Theatre in England.

Morison made only three film appearances after her stage triumph in Kiss Me, Kate. These were a cameo part as writer George Sand in the biopic Song Without End (1960), co-starring Dirk Bogarde as composer Franz Liszt, in which director George Cukor thought Morison's voice was too feminine so had it re-dubbed with a different actress, another cameo in the comedy film Won Ton Ton, the Dog Who Saved Hollywood (1976), and as herself in the documentary Broadway—The Golden Years (2003).

In July 1985, Morison traveled to New Zealand to star in the role of Alika in the Michael Edgley revival of Sir Robert Helpmann & her friend Eaton Magoon Jr's Hawaiian musical Aloha at His Majesty's Theatre, Auckland, directed by Joe Layton and musically directed by Derek Williams, who had also orchestrated and conducted the world première at Hamilton Founders Theatre in 1981. Derek Metzger from the Hamilton première co-starred with Morison in the Auckland revival.

On November 18, 1999, Morison attended the opening night performance of the successful Kiss Me, Kate Broadway revival, the first such revival in New York, starring Brian Stokes Mitchell and Marin Mazzie (in the role Morison originated in 1948). At the time of her death in May 2018, Morison was one of the very few living cast members, and the only surviving featured player from that original production.

== Later years ==
In later years Morison devoted herself to painting—one of her early passions—and had several showings in and around Los Angeles. Never married and childfree, she lived in the Park La Brea apartment complex in Los Angeles from 1961 onwards. Originally raised Protestant, Morison converted to Catholicism.

In December 2012, at age 97, she appeared on stage in an evening entitled Ladies of an Indeterminate Age at the Pantages Theatre in Los Angeles. Her co-stars included Charlotte Rae and Anne Jeffreys.

In March 2014, at age 99, she appeared onstage for Broadway Backwards 9, a benefit for Broadway Cares/Equity Fights AIDS and the Lesbian, Gay, Bisexual and Transgender Community Center at the Al Hirschfeld Theater. She sang "Brush Up Your Shakespeare" from Kiss Me, Kate.

In conjunction with her 100th birthday, the Pasadena Playhouse sponsored an evening with Patricia Morison on March 15, 2015, including an audience Q & A session and selections from Kiss Me, Kate performed by the guest of honor. Morison was also interviewed in the Los Angeles Times on March 7, 2015, and by namesake Patt Morrison on KPCC radio in Los Angeles.

== Death ==
Morison died at her home in Los Angeles on May 20, 2018, at the age of 103.
