= Sigrid Gurie =

American actress (1911–1969)

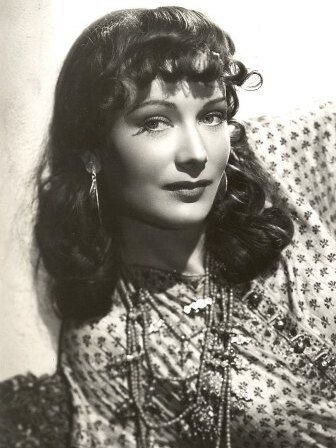
- Sigrid Gurie in Algiers (1938)
- Born: Sigrid Guri Haukelid; May 18, 1911; Brooklyn, New York, U.S.
- Died: August 14, 1969 (aged 58); Mexico City, Mexico
- Occupation: Actress
- Years active: 1937–1950
- Spouses: Thomas Stewart (m. 1935; div. 1938) Dr. Lawrence Spangard (m. 1939; div. 1948) Lynn Abbott (m. 1958; div. 1961)
- Relatives: Knut Haukelid (brother)

Sigrid Gurie (born Sigrid Guri Haukelid; May 18, 1911 – August 14, 1969) was a Norwegian-American actress from the late 1930s to early 1940s.

== Early life ==
Gurie was born in Brooklyn, New York. Her father was a civil engineer who worked for the New York City Subway from 1902 to 1912. As she and her twin brother, Knut, were born in the United States, the twins held dual Norwegian-American citizenship. In 1914, the family returned to Norway. Sigrid subsequently grew up in Oslo and was educated in Norway, Sweden, and Belgium.

In 1935, Gurie married Thomas Stewart of California; she filed for divorce in 1938. Her brother became a noted member of the Norwegian resistance movement during World War II. Knut Haukelid died at age 82 in 1994.

== Career ==
In 1936, Gurie arrived in Hollywood. Film magnate Sam Goldwyn reportedly took credit for discovering her, promoting his discovery as "the Norwegian Garbo" and billed her as "the siren of the fjords". When the press discovered Gurie's birth in Flatbush, Goldwyn then claimed "the greatest hoax in movie history."

Gurie performed well in the supporting role of Ines in Algiers (1938), but did less well in Universal’s Three Faces West (1940), the New York Times deeming her effort “less than adequate.” Gurie accepted the lead role in Voice in the Wind (1944), but the production was panned by critics. She had a minor role in the classic Norwegian film Kampen om tungtvannet (1948). The movie was based principally on the book Skis Against the Atom which was written by her brother, Knut Haukelid, a noted saboteur and member of the Norwegian resistance against German occupation in World War II.

== Later years and death ==
In the late 1940s she attended the Kann Art Institute, operated in West Hollywood by abstract artist Frederick I. Kann (1886–1965). She studied oils and portraiture. Among her works were landscapes, portraits and pen and ink sketches.

From 1961 to 1969 she lived in San Miguel de Allende, Mexico, where she continued painting, and was also designing jewelry for Royal Copenhagen in Denmark. She entered the hospital in Mexico City on an emergency basis for a recurring kidney problem, then developed a blood clot that passed through her lungs, which led to her death.

== Filmography ==
Year	Title	Role	Notes
1937	The Road Back	Soldier's wife	Uncredited
1938	Algiers	Ines	
1938	The Adventures of Marco Polo	Princess Kukachin	
1939	The Forgotten Woman	Anne Kennedy	
1939	Rio	Irene Reynard	
1940	Three Faces West	Leni "Lenchen" Braun	
1940	Dark Streets of Cairo	Ellen Stephens	
1944	Voice in the Wind	Marya	
1944	Enemy of Women	Magda Quandt	
1948	Kampen om tungtvannet (released internationally as Operation Swallow: The Battle for Heavy Water)		
1948	Sword of the Avenger	Maria Louisa	
1948	Sofia	Linda Carlsen	
1950	The Du Pont Story	Sophie du Pont	
