= Tarzan and the Huntress =

1947 film by Kurt Neumann

- Poster of Tarzan and the Huntress
- Directed by: Kurt Neumann
- Written by: Jerry Gruskin; Rowland Leigh; Leslie Charteris
- Based on: Characters created by Edgar Rice Burroughs
- Produced by: Sol Lesser; Kurt Neumann
- Starring: Johnny Weissmuller; Brenda Joyce; Johnny Sheffield; Patricia Morison
- Cinematography: Archie Stout
- Edited by: Merrill G. White
- Music by: Paul Sawtell
- Production company: Sol Lesser Productions
- Distributed by: RKO Radio Pictures
- Release date: April 5, 1947 (U.S.)
- Running time: 72 minutes
- Country: United States
- Language: English

Tarzan and the Huntress is a 1947 American adventure film starring Johnny Weissmuller in his eleventh outing as Tarzan. Brenda Joyce makes the third of five appearances as Jane and Johnny Sheffield marks his eighth and final appearance as Boy. Patricia Morison and Barton MacLane co-star. The film was produced by Sol Lesser and Kurt Neumann, written by Jerry Gruskin and Rowland Leigh (based on characters created by Edgar Rice Burroughs) and directed by Kurt Neumann. It was released on April 5, 1947. Notable for featuring one of only a handful of screenplays co-written by UK author Leslie Charteris, creator of the pulp fiction character Simon Templar (a.k.a., The Saint).; it was the last screenplay for a Hollywood film credited to Charteris.

== Plot ==
Due to a shortage of animals in American zoos following World War II, Tanya Rawlins, a big-game "huntress," Carl Marley, her financial backer and Paul Weir, a cruel trail boss, are given permission by King Farrod, to capture a male and female of each species of animal on his land.

In a subplot, Oziri, nephew to King Farrod, colludes with Weir to allow him to trap more animals than bargained for. He also has Weir's men kill King Farrod and his son, Prince Suli, in order for him to take over the throne. Farrod is shot in the back and killed, and Suli is thrown into a pit full of crocodiles, but, unknown to all watching, he lands on a hidden ledge and is knocked unconscious.

Boy trades two lion cubs to the trappers for a flashlight. When Tarzan finds out, he returns the flashlight, retrieves the cubs, and calls all the animals from King Farrod's land across the river to his part of the jungle. When the hunters begin trapping on his side of the river, Tarzan and Boy sneak into their camp at night, take their guns and hide them in a cave behind a waterfall. They then begin to systematically release all the trapped animals from their cages.

Cheeta inadvertently reveals the location of the cache of weapons to Rawlins and her safari.

Prince Suli is able to make his way through the jungle, and is found by Tarzan. Tarzan, Boy and a herd of elephants defeat both the usurping nephew and the huntress, but the latter escapes on board a plane.

== Cast ==
- Johnny Weissmuller as Tarzan
- Brenda Joyce as Jane
- Johnny Sheffield as Boy
- Patricia Morison as Tanya Rawlins, unscrupulous big game huntress
- Barton MacLane as Paul Weir, villainous trail boss
- John Warburton as Carl Marley, backer of Rawlins' expedition
- Charles Trowbridge as King Farrod
- Ted Hecht as Prince Ozira
- Wallace Scott as 'Smitty' Smithers

== Production notes ==
A character arc throughout the film is Boy's acceptance of adult responsibilities. In one line of dialogue Tarzan says, "Boy man now." Sheffield was sixteen when the film was released and producer Sol Lesser thought he had outgrown the role of a cute boy, so the character did not appear in further films.

== Critical reception ==
Bosley Crowther 's review of the film in The New York Times noted that "this observer was looking for some changes [...] Nothing doing. The Tarzans are still living idyllically up in the trees," that "unwary outsiders are still trying to invade their jungle domain," and "Tarzan simply calls on his friends, the elephants, to overrun the aliens and put a spoke in their wheel." A review of the film in Variety described it as "a moderately entertaining adventure film" with a story "modeled after the countless plots found in any juvenile’s library," and noted that the "acting is also singularly undistinguished. Johnny Weissmuller’s lines are confined to monosyllabic utterances and his still striking physique remains his top asset. Kurt Neumann could have directed at a faster pace." Writing in Turner Classic Movies, Andrea Passfiume described the film as "One of the best and liveliest of the latter-day Sol Lesser produced RKO Tarzan flicks," and noted that "the real star of the show is the ever-popular Cheta, Tarzan's mischievous chimpanzee, who provides plenty of riotous comic moments."
