= Half Angel (1951 film) =

1951 film by Richard Sale

- Directed by: Richard Sale
- Written by: George Carleton Brown
- Screenplay by: Robert Riskin
- Produced by: Julian Blaustein
- Starring: Loretta Young; Joseph Cotten; Cecil Kellaway
- Cinematography: Milton R. Krasner
- Edited by: Robert Fritch
- Music by: Cyril J. Mockridge
- Distributed by: Twentieth Century-Fox
- Release date: May 5, 1951
- Running time: 77 minutes
- Country: United States
- Language: English
- Box office: $1.5 million

Half Angel is a 1951 Technicolor American romantic comedy film directed by Richard Sale and starring Loretta Young, Joseph Cotten and Cecil Kellaway.

== Plot ==
Nora Gilpin is a prim and proper nurse who recognizes rich and famous attorney John Raymond as he passes through the hospital. One night while sleepwalking, she dons a glamorous dress and visits John at his home, behaving seductively. She enchants John, who faintly recognizes her but cannot recall who she is. Nora does not reveal her name. She hurriedly leaves, tearing her petticoat on John's front gate and leaving a small piece of lace behind. She returns to bed and awakens with no knowledge of the night's events.

The next day, John desperately wants to locate the mysterious woman and employs a private detective to find her and match the lace to a woman, to no avail. John scours the streets and finally spots Nora in a shop with her fiancé Tim McCarey, but Nora angrily denies having seen him during the night.

At the train station, where he is about to board a train for Washington, D.C. to argue a case before the Supreme Court, John again sees Nora, who is sleepwalking. He cancels his trip and they visit an amusement park, where John pays $500 to keep the park open all night, and they ride the rollercoaster repeatedly until daybreak. As they are talking, John realizes that he knew Nora many years ago as a child. Nora returns home and again awakens with no recollection of the night.

John tries to visit Nora at the hospital but she defiantly denies a romantic relationship with him, recognizing him only as the famous attorney. He attempts to embrace her and she angrily escapes. John is charged with assault and requests a jury trial so that he can interrogate Nora on the stand.

At the trial, Nora continues to deny personally knowing John. He presents the piece of lace, which Nora appears to recognize, leaving her speechless. The rollercoaster operator testifies that Nora is not the woman who had accompanied John that night, as that woman had "razzle-dazzle" that Nora, sitting in the courtroom, seems to lack. John is found guilty and pays a fine. At home, Nora is shocked to discover that her petticoat is indeed missing a portion of lace.

On the night before her wedding to Tim, Nora sleepwalks and visits John. He is determined to prove his story and proposes an instant wedding. They gather witnesses and marry, but when Nora awakens in a bed in John's room, she is horrified and escapes through an open window.

Nora is about to marry Tim at her house when John hastily enters, shouting that the ceremony must be stopped. The wedding witnesses recognize Nora from the previous night, corroborating his story. Nora faints but awakens to recognize John as her husband, whom she loves.

== Production ==
In March 1948, MGM acquired an option to purchase a story by author George Carleton Brown and hired Everett Riskin as producer. His brother Robert Riskincollaborated with Brown to write a screenplay, and the brothers formed Equitable Pictures to produce the film. The project was originally intended as a vehicle for Lana Turner. In late 1949, the project was no longer associated with MGM, and three studios were bidding for it as a package deal that included Loretta Young in the lead role, with Twentieth Century-Fox acquiring the production.

Filming began in June 1950 with Jules Dassin as director, but Dassin left the production over script disagreements with Young and was replaced with Richard Sale.

== Cast ==
- Loretta Young as Nora Gilpin (Singing voice dubbed by Martha Mears)
- Joseph Cotten as John Raymond Jr.
- Cecil Kellaway as Harry Gilpin
- Basil Ruysdael as Dr. Jackson
- Jim Backus as Mike Hogan
- Irene Ryan as Nurse Kay
- John Ridgely as Tim McCarey

== Reception ==
In a contemporary review for The New York Times, critic Bosley Crowther wrote: "[T]he whole affair is not only painfully embarrassing but almost too inept to believe. For what we are stuck with in this picture is a curiously dual-natured dame who, in her lucid moments, is a frightened and frustrated nurse. But when she goes sleep-walking, as she apparently often does, she has all the lack of inhibition of a flirtatious burlesque queen. .... Miss Young's artless demonstration of her makes her no less agreeable to take. In her lucid moments, she is tiresome; in her lunatic moments, she has the charm and the coquettish indiscretion of a girl in a taxi dancehall. Poor Mr. Cotten's performance as the gentleman exposed to this allure, which he is supposed to grab—hook, line and sinker—is embarrassed and pitiable to see. ... [T]hey hobble and hob along to the tune of Richard Sale's weak direction and Robert Riskin's ridiculous script. Twentieth Century-Fox put all in color, but why is more than we can see."

Critic Philip K. Scheuer of the Los Angeles Times called the film a "fantastic comedy" and wrote: "Nora's creator, 20th Century-Fox, may not think of the picture about her as fantastic, but I do. I don't know bow else you can look at it psychologically, even though, as entertainment, it qualifies with a passing mark."
