= A Ticket to Tomahawk =

1950 film by Richard Sale

- Theatrical release poster
- Directed by: Richard Sale
- Written by: Mary Loos; Richard Sale
- Produced by: Robert Bassler
- Starring: Dan Dailey; Anne Baxter
- Cinematography: Harry Jackson
- Edited by: Harmon Jones
- Music by: Cyril J. Mockridge
- Color process: Technicolor
- Production company: 20th Century Fox
- Distributed by: 20th Century Fox
- Release dates: April 18, 1950 (Denver, Colorado); May 19, 1950 (United States)
- Running time: 90 minutes
- Country: United States
- Language: English
- Box office: $1.3 million

A Ticket to Tomahawk is a 1950 American Western film directed by Richard Sale and starring Dan Dailey and Anne Baxter. It was released by 20th Century Fox. Marilyn Monroe appears in one of her earliest roles.

== Plot ==
In 1876, traveling salesman Johnny Jameson, is the only passenger on the inaugural run of the Tomahawk and Western Railroad's narrow gauge train through the Colorado Rockies. The train is pulled by the railroad's only locomotive, named Emma Sweeny. The conductor tells Johnny that certain people, such as stagecoach operators, would like to see the railroad fail.

Dakota, Trancas and Gila, who work for Colonel Dawson, the area stageline operator, cause a giant boulder to fall directly in the path of the train. Engineer Terence Sweeny is able to stop in time, but the train cannot move until the boulder is removed.

Johnny hitches a ride into town with Trancas and Gila. At the sheriff's office, when Johnny tries to report the train's delay to deputy Chuckity Jones, he is knocked unconscious by Trancas. U.S. Marshal Dodge is in the room next door preparing to welcome the train with help from his tomboyish, knife-wielding granddaughter Kit. As they leave for the depot, they are surprised by Trancas and Gila. The marshal shoots Trancas but is wounded by Gila. Johnny appears and Kit suspects that he may also be one of the gang. She orders him to leave town before sunset.

Kit is deputized as a marshal by her grandfather, who cannot travel because of his wound. She and Indian companion Pawnee are assigned to escort the train to Tomahawk. Dawson orders Dakota to join the posse that is escorting the train and also an Indian scout, Black Wolf, to rally the local Arapahos. Other gang members plot to destroy the engine during a night stop.

Sweeny learns that there is no track laid for the next 40 miles, as the rails were lost at sea in transport from England, and that because the train must reach Tomahawk to fulfill the requirements of the franchise contract, it will be hauled by a team of mules. The train must reach Tomahawk by a rapidly approaching deadline with at least one paying passenger. Kit is dismayed to discover that the passenger assigned to her care is Johnny, who is now reluctant to travel on the train. Johnny is roped to the side of the engine, and the locomotive, without its passenger car, begins to move, pulled by the mules and accompanied by assorted wagons. Chinaman Long Time joins the group with laundry for Tomahawk, together with Madame Adelaide, a musician and her dancing girls, Annie, Ruby, Clara and Julie.

Dawson's men Bat, Charley and Fargo appear at a night stop claiming to be telegraph men who are there to repair lines cut by the Arapahos. Kit grants them permission to bunk in the camp. Johnny convinces Madame Adelaide and the dancers to perform a show in the camp. Kit gradually softens her attitude towards Johnny.

When all are asleep, Bat and Charley leave while Fargo tosses sticks of dynamite under the engine. Johnny, sleeping alongside the train, smells the lit fuse and alerts the others. Kit cuts the fuse with a shot and disables Fargo, but before he can talk, Dakota kills him.

Some time later, a few miles beyond where the track restarts, Bat and Charley are placing dynamite charges under a trestle. Johnny, Kit and Pawnee are scouting ahead and stop at the bridge. Bat and Charley consider shooting them but are then themselves attacked and killed by Indians, and the dynamite explodes prematurely. Kit, Johnny and Pawnee are chased back to the train, which is then attacked by the war party. Johnny identifies the Arapaho chief, Crooked Knife, having previously worked with him in a traveling Western show.

After the war party is repelled, Johnny volunteers to talk peace with Crooked Knife. He has learned that Long Time is carrying a load of fireworks and develops a plan. He is welcomed by Crooked Knife, who agrees to allow the train safe passage. However, some of the braves distrust Johnny and ask him to produce a sign that he is "big medicine". Johnny launches a rocket, signaling Kit and Dakota to ignite the rest of the fireworks on a nearby hill, and the Indians are impressed. As the railway bridge is now out, Kit intends to take the locomotive over a mountain by dismantling it and carrying it in pieces. Dawson thinks he has been double-crossed and shoots Black Wolf. He then gathers his men for a final showdown.

The Emma Sweeny is disassembled and hauled over the mountain by the mules. The engine is reassembled when the parts reach the track. Kit discovers that the water tower needed to fill the tender has been sabotaged by Dakota, but unknown to Dakota, the tender was already filled with water.

When Kit discovers that he sabotaged the tower, Dakota jumps aboard the train, slugs Johnny and forces the fireman to start the engine moving, leaving Kit and the rest of the party behind. Kit jumps into the cab and Dakota tries to shoot him, but Dakota has n0 ammunition and throws his gun at her instead, knocking her unconscious. Johnny awakens, and while he and Dakota fight on top of the cabin, Kit appears and throws her knife at Dakota, causing him to fall from the train and plunge to his death.

Dawson and his gang ambush the train but cannot reach it. However, they shoot holes in the boiler. The Emma Sweeny loses steam pressure and slows to a halt within sight of Tomahawk. A posse headed by Marshal Dodge rides from the town and, together with the Araphoe, subdue Dawson's gang. Dawson flees but is pursued by Pawnee, who throws a tomahawk at him. As the train has stopped just short of its goal, Johnny attempts to talk the mayor of Tomahawk into extending the town limits, thereby fulfilling the requirements of the franchise. He succeeds with seconds to spare.

Kit has fallen in love with Johnny, but he says that he cannot be with her, as he cannot surrender his traveling life. She grabs her knife and threatens to cripple him to prevent him from traveling.

Several years later, Johnny is married to Kit and working as the train conductor. As the train gains steam, he limps after it, waving to Kit and their five young daughters, all named after Madame Adelaide's dancers.

== Cast ==
- Dan Dailey as Johnny Behind-the-Deuces
- Anne Baxter as Kit Dodge Jr.
- Rory Calhoun as Dakota
- Walter Brennan as Terence Sweeny
- Charles Kemper as Deputy Chuckity Jones
- Connie Gilchrist as Madame Adelaide
- Arthur Hunnicutt as Sad Eyes
- Will Wright as Dodge
- Chief Yowlachie as Pawnee
- Victor Sen Yung as Long Time
- Marilyn Monroe as Clara (uncredited)
- Olin Howland as Railway Conductor (uncredited)
- George Melford as Stationmaster (uncredited)
- Charles Stevens as Trancos (uncredited)

== Production ==
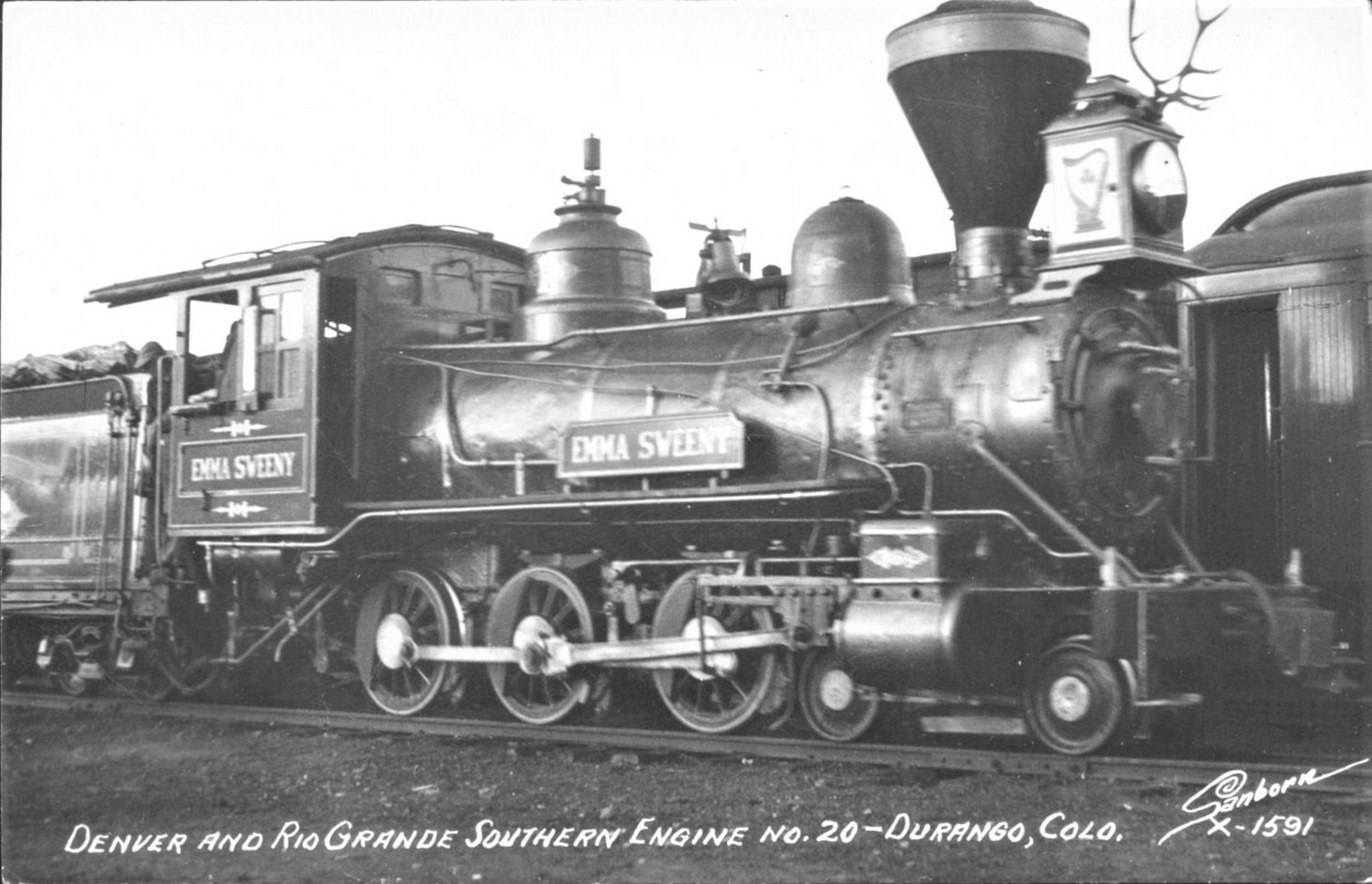
Rio Grande Southern #20

The steam locomotive shown in the film as Emma Sweeny was Rio Grande Southern #20, a three-foot-(0.91-meter)-gauge 4-6-0 Ten-Wheeler built by the Schenectady Locomotive Works in 1899. To appear older, it was fitted with a false smokestack, headlight and various other parts. It was also given a colorful paint scheme. The scenes of Emma Sweeny running under steam were shot on the Denver and Rio Grande Western Railroad's Silverton Branch north of Rockwood, Colorado, and a shot of the train crossing a large trestle used the Rio Grande Southern Railroad's Lightner Creek Trestle.

For the scenes in which the locomotive is pulled by mules while off the track, a full-size wooden replica of RGS #20 was built, as the real locomotive would have been too heavy for the mules to pull. The mules pulled the model over parts of Molas Pass and on Reservoir Hill, which is now the site of Fort Lewis College. After filming was completed, the replica changed hands several times, eventually being used in Petticoat Junction as a studio stand-in for the Hooterville Cannonball.

In 2011, the wooden Emma Sweeny model was donated to the Durango Railroad Historical Society, which restored its Emma Sweeny appearance and placed it on display at Santa Rita Park in Durango, Colorado.

In 2020, Rio Grande Southern #20 returned to operation, having last run in 1951. It was restored over a 14-year period and made its public debut on August 1, 2020. It is now operational and resides at the Colorado Railroad Museum.

== Soundtrack ==
- "Oh, What a Forward Young Man You Are", performed by Marilyn Monroe, Marion Marshall, Joyce MacKenzie, Barbara Smith and Dan Dailey
- "A Ticket to Tomahawk", sung by chorus during the opening credits, later sung by Dan Dailey
- "Poor Paddy Works on the Railway", sung by Dan Dailey
- "Ta-ra-ra Boom-de-ay"
- "Oh, Dem Golden Slippers"
- "Polly Wolly Doodle"
- "She'll Be Coming 'Round the Mountain"
- "Ach, Du Lieber Augustine"
- "The Irish Washerwoman"
- "Cheyenne"

== Reception ==
In a contemporary review for The New York Times, critic Bosley Crowther called the film "a pretty good show" and wrote: "[I]t's a funny idea, cleverly engineered, with enough velocity at the outset to carry it most of the way. ... Shot very largely on location in western Colorado, it does have an airiness and a beauty that you don't often find in such films."
