= Kay Nelson =

American costume designer (1909–2003)

- Born: September 14, 1909
- Died: September 1, 2003 (aged 93); Antioch, CA
- Occupation: costume designer
- Years active: 1944-1961
- Spouse: Lyle R. Wheeler (March 17, 1949)-?
- Children: Maurice Emery Nelson, Karen Elizabeth Nelson Mason

Kay Nelson (née Bushard) was a Hollywood costume designer at 20th Century Fox whose first film was Up in Mabel's Room in 1944. Over the next 17 years, she provided the costumes for such films as Leave Her to Heaven (1945), Boomerang, Miracle on 34th Street and Gentleman's Agreement (all 1947) and A Letter to Three Wives (1949).

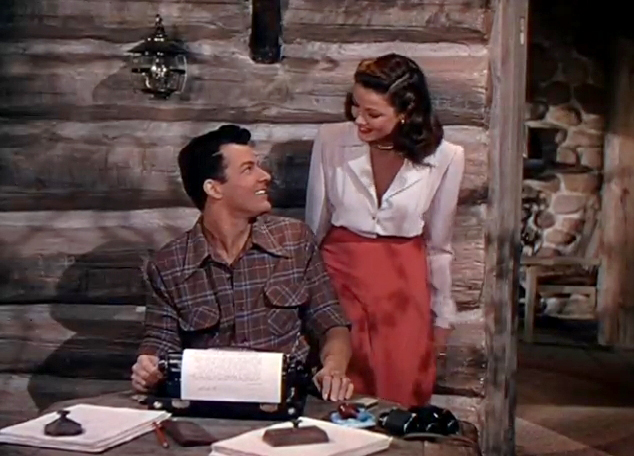
Gene Tierney in Leave Her to Heaven (1945) in a costume designed by Kay Nelson.

At 20th Century Fox she worked under Charles LeMarie, who assembled a department of costume designers that included Rene Hubert, Bonnie Cashin and Oleg Cassini.

She was married to Lyle Wheeler, an Art Director at 20th Century Fox.

She was nominated for an Academy Award for Best Costume Design (Color) for Mother Is a Freshman (1949).

Her last film was the British crime drama The Mark in 1961.

== Costume design credits ==
- Up in Mabel's Room (1944)
- Take it or Leave it (1944)
- Something for the Boys (1944, with Yvonne Wood)
- Winged Victory (1944)
- Sunday Dinner for a Soldier (1944)
- Hangover Square (1944, with Rene Hubert)
- Billy Rose's Diamond Horseshoe (released as Diamond Horseshoe in Great Britain) (1945, with Rene Huburt, Sascha Brastoff, Bonnie Cashin)
- Within These Walls (1945)
- Leave Her to Heaven (1945)
- Behind Green Lights (1945)
- Shock (1946)
- Sentimental Journey (1946)
- The Dark Corner (1946)
- Do You Love Me (1946, with Edward Stevenson)
- Somewhere in the Night (1946)
- Margie (1946)
- Boomerang (1946, with Charles LeMaire)
- Miracle on 34th Street, (1947, with Charles LeMaire)
- Gentleman's Agreement (1947, with Charlie LeMaire)
- The Homestretch (1947, with Charles LeMaire)
- Call Northside 777 (1948, with Charles LeMaire)
- You were Meant for Me (1948, with Charles LeMaire)
- Street With No Name (1948, with Charles LeMaire)
- Sitting Pretty (1948, with Charles LeMaire)
- The Walls of Jericho (1948, with Charles LeMaire)
- Hollow Triumph, released as The Scar in Great Britain (1948)
- Apartment for Peggy (1948, with Charlie LeMaire)
- Road House (1948, with Charlie LeMaire)
- Mother Is a Freshman, also realised as Mother Knows Best in Great Britain (1949, with Charles LeMaire)
- A Letter to Three Wives (1949, with Charles LeMaire)
- Come to the Stable (1949, with Charles LeMaire)
- Everybody Does It (1949, with Charles LeMaire)
- Father was a Fullback (1949)
- Slattery's Hurricane (1949)
- Thieves Highway (1949, with Charles LeMaire)
- Blowing Wild (1953, with Marjorie Best)
- A Lion Is in the Streets (1953)
- Witness to Murder (1954)
- Violent Saturday (1955, with Charles LeMaire)
- Daddy Long Legs (1955, with Charles LeMaire; ballet costumes by Tom Keogh)
- Tall Story (1959)
- The Mark (1961)
