= Robert Patten (actor) =

American film and television actor

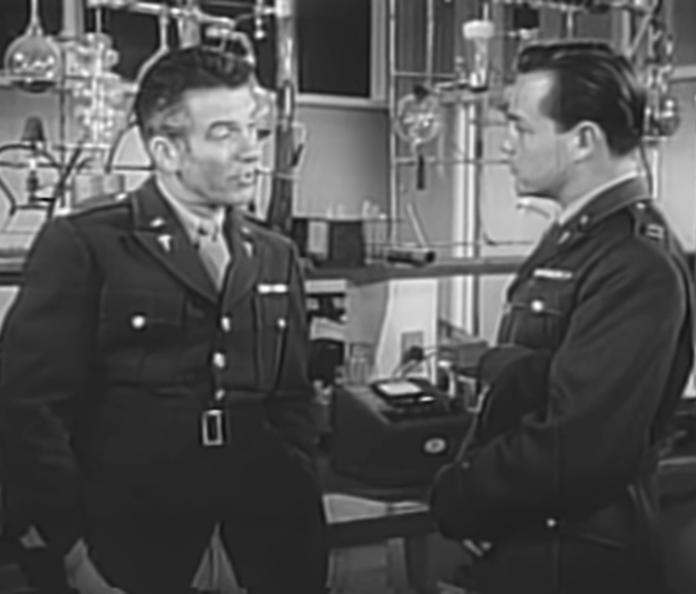
- Patten (right) with Hugh Beaumont in Medic, 1955
- Born: Robert Fitz Randolph Patten; October 11, 1925; Tacoma, Washington, U.S.
- Died: December 29, 2001 (aged 76); Malibu, California, U.S.
- Education: University of Washington
- Occupation: Actor
- Years active: 1947–1993
- Spouse: Peggy Lloyd (m. 1956)

Robert Fitz Randolph Patten (October 11, 1925 – December 29, 2001) was an American film and television actor. He was best known for playing Lieutenant Jesse Bishop in the 1949 film Twelve O'Clock High.

== Personal life and death ==
Patten married Marjorie Lloyd Ross on March 3, 1956, in Las Vegas. In 1962, he was named in the divorce case of Glynis Johns. Divorce Court in London granted a divorce to Johns's husband as a result of her adultery with Patten.

Patten died on December 29, 2001 of cancer at his home in Malibu, California, at the age of 76.

== Partial filmography ==
- Black Gold (1947) - Jockey (uncredited)
- The Street with No Name (1948) - Robert Danker (uncredited)
- Apartment for Peggy (1948) - Student (uncredited)
- When My Baby Smiles at Me (1948) - Sailor (uncredited)
- Mother Is a Freshman (1949) - Young Man (uncredited)
- Mr. Belvedere Goes to College (1949) - Joe Fisher
- It Happens Every Spring (1949) - Cab Driver (uncredited)
- Sand (1949) - Boyd
- Slattery's Hurricane (1949) - Lieutenant at Desk (uncredited)
- I Was a Male War Bride (1949) - Interne (uncredited)
- Father Was a Fullback (1949) - Manager (uncredited)
- Twelve O'Clock High (1949) - Lieutenant Jesse Bishop
- When Willie Comes Marching Home (1950) - Corporal Heckling Bill (uncredited)
- Where the Sidewalk Ends (1950) - Medical Examiner (uncredited)
- American Guerrilla in the Philippines (1950) - Lovejoy
- The Frogmen (1951) - Lieutenant Klinger (uncredited)
- The Dennis Day Show (1954) (Season 3, Episode 29: "Ann Blyth/Johnny Carson") - Dr. Jim McNulty (uncredited)
- Riot in Cell Block 11 (1954) - Frank
- Return from the Sea (1954) - Welch
- Unchained (1955) - Johnny Swanson (uncredited)
- Alfred Hitchcock Presents (1956) (Season 1 Episode 14: "A Bullet for Baldwin") - Detective
- Alfred Hitchcock Presents (1956) (Season 1 Episode 16: "You Got to Have Luck") - Willis the Co-Pilot
- D-Day the Sixth of June (1956) - Petty Officer (uncredited)
- Bells Are Ringing (1960) - Party Guest (uncredited)
- Love in a Goldfish Bowl (1961) - Lieutenant J. G. Marchon
- Breakfast at Tiffany's (1961) - Party Guest (uncredited)
- A Guide for the Married Man (1967) - Party Guest
- Airport (1970) - Captain Benson
- Zig Zag (1970) - John Raymond
- The Love Machine (1971) - Reporter (uncredited)
- Westworld (1973) - Technician
- Black Sunday (1977) - Vickers
- FM (1978) - Jack Rapp
- Personal Best (1982) - Colin Sales
