= Let's Make It Legal =

1951 film by Richard Sale

- Theatrical release poster
- Directed by: Richard Sale
- Screenplay by: F. Hugh Herbert; I. A. L. Diamond
- Story by: Mortimer Braus
- Produced by: Robert Bassler
- Starring: Claudette Colbert; Macdonald Carey; Zachary Scott; Barbara Bates; Marilyn Monroe; Robert Wagner; Frank Cady
- Cinematography: Lucien Ballard
- Edited by: Robert Fritch
- Music by: Cyril Mockridge
- Production company: Twentieth Century-Fox
- Distributed by: Twentieth Century-Fox
- Release date: November 6, 1951 (New York City)
- Running time: 77 minutes
- Country: United States
- Language: English
- Box office: $1.25 million (U.S. rentals)

Let's Make It Legal is a 1951 American romantic comedy film directed by Richard Sale and starring Claudette Colbert, Macdonald Carey, Zachary Scott, Barbara Bates, Marilyn Monroe, Robert Wagner, and Frank Cady. The film was produced by Robert Bassler from a screenplay by F. Hugh Herbert and I. A. L. Diamond, based on a story by Mortimer Braus entitled "My Mother-in-Law, Miriam".

== Plot ==
Miriam and Hugh Halsworth are in the final stages of their divorce, which she initiated because he is an inveterate gambler. Their adult daughter Barbara is living in the family home with Miriam, along with Barbara's husband, Jerry Denham, and Barbara and Jerry's baby daughter Annabelle, while Hugh is living at the Hotel Miramar in Santa Monica, where he works as head of publicity. Jerry, who works for Hugh, would like to leave the house so that Barbara will stop relying on her mother so much, but Barbara does not want to leave Miriam alone.

Victor Macfarland, a self-made millionaire financier who is rumored to be the next American representative to the International Monetary Fund (IMF), stays at the Miramar. Hugh is unhappy to see Victor, as the men were rivals for Miriam's hand in high school, and Miriam expresses no interest in seeing Victor, as she has not heard from him since he abruptly left town 20 years earlier.

Miriam is annoyed that Hugh still spends a great deal of time at their house to care for his prized rosebushes. On the last day before the divorce is finalized, he claims to have quit gambling and convinces Miriam to dine with him, but a call from his bookie ruins his plans. Victor arrives and Miriam invites him to stay for dinner. Hugh sulks alone on the patio while Miriam and Victor dance inside, and they have a champagne toast at midnight to mark the official end of the marriage.

Hugh tries to disrupt the romance by introducing Victor to beauty-contest winner Joyce Mannering, but Victor is not distracted. Victor invites Miriam to travel with him, but she has responsibilities as a mother and grandmother and says that they should not see each other any further. He stops her from leaving his hotel room, and when Miriam returns home, she announces that she is to marry Victor in three days.

The day before the wedding, Victor tells Miriam that he has to travel to Washington, D.C., for a hearing on his appointment to the IMF, and she agrees to follow him the next day so that they can marry as planned. Just before Victor boards the plane, Miriam insists that he explain why he had abandoned her 20 years earlier, and he admits that he had lost her to Hugh in a game of craps.

Miriam is furious and angrily phones Hugh. She threatens to unearth his rosebushes, so after dark, he moves them. He enlists Jerry to help him, but they are arrested for trespassing. Jerry phones Miriam to come to the police station to identify them, and in the morning, national news headlines announce that Victor's fiancée was seen leaving the station with her ex-husband.

The story proves awkward for Victor, and he phones Miriam to advise her to remain at home until the furor subsides and he is confirmed for the IMF post. However, she breaks off their engagement. When Hugh arrives to collect his possessions, Miriam says that she cannot forgive him for gambling for her, as it proves that he did not really love her. Hugh always carries the pair of dice that he and Victor had used in the craps game and he asks Miriam to roll them. She learns that rolling the trick dice always results in one three and one four. Hugh says that he cheated because the stakes were so high, and he and Miriam kiss.

== Cast ==
- Claudette Colbert as Miriam Halsworth
- Macdonald Carey as Hugh Halsworth
- Zachary Scott as Victor Macfarland
- Barbara Bates as Barbara Denham
- Robert Wagner as Jerry Denham
- Marilyn Monroe as Joyce Mannering
- Frank Cady as Ferguson

Uncredited

- Jim Hayward as Pete
- Joan Fisher as Annabella
- Carol Savage as Miss Jessup
- Kathleen Freeman as reporter
- Michael Ross as policeman
- Jack Mather as policeman
- Ralph Sanford as police lieutenant

== Production ==
The film, with working titles of Don't Call Me Mother and Grandma Was a Golddigger, was produced by Robert Bassler from a screenplay written by F. Hugh Herbert and I. A. L. Diamond, which was based on a story by Mortimer Braus titled "My Mother-in-Law, Miriam". The film's musical director was by Cyril J. Mockridge and the cinematographer was Lucien Ballard.

The hotel swimming-pool scenes were shot on location at the Miramar Hotel in Santa Monica, California.

== Reception ==
In a contemporary review for The New York Times, critic Howard Thompson wrote: "[A] bright little comedy of middle-aged American divorce has quietly slipped into town. And no spectator with an ounce of insight or mischief will be any worse for the wear, we guarantee. The nicest thing about this trim package from Twentieth Century-Fox is that for all the sly, wholesome winking at the American home scene in general, it manages to be adroitly constructive about such elements as 'friendly' divorce, the selfishness of children, long-visit in-laws and the fatal absurdities of marital pride. ... Richard Sale has so saucily directed the proceedings, which, incidentally, reunite the parents with a most original story twist, that the cast will have to share a bouquet between them."
