= Gentlemen Marry Brunettes =

1955 film by Richard Sale

- Theatrical release poster
- Directed by: Richard Sale
- Screenplay by: Mary Loos; Richard Sale
- Based on: But Gentlemen Marry Brunettes by Anita Loos
- Produced by: Richard Sale; Robert Waterfield
- Starring: Jane Russell; Jeanne Crain; Alan Young; Scott Brady; Rudy Vallee
- Cinematography: Desmond Dickinson
- Edited by: Grant K. Smith
- Music by: Robert Farnon
- Production company: Russ-Field Productions
- Distributed by: United Artists
- Release dates: September 22, 1955 (Chicago); October 29, 1955 (New York City)
- Running time: 99 minutes
- Country: United States
- Language: English
- Budget: $2 million
- Box office: $1.5 million (US)

Gentlemen Marry Brunettes is a 1955 American Technicolor musical romantic comedy film directed by Richard Sale, who co-wrote the screenplay with Mary Loos, based on the 1927 novel But Gentlemen Marry Brunettes by Anita Loos, aunt of Mary Loos. The film stars Jane Russell and Jeanne Crain. It was produced by Sale and Bob Waterfield, with Robert Bassler as executive producer.

Anita Loos authored the 1925 novel and 1926 play Gentlemen Prefer Blondes, which had been adapted into the highly successful 1953 film of the same name, starring Russell and Marilyn Monroe. The studio attempted to repeat the formula, with Russell returning but Jeanne Crain stepping in for a presumably otherwise engaged Monroe (both women played new characters). Alan Young, Scott Brady and Rudy Vallee also appear. However, Brunettes was not as well received as its predecessor.

With choreography by Jack Cole, who had previously contributed to Blondes, a young Gwen Verdon filmed a specialty number that was cut from the US release as being too sexy.

== Plot ==
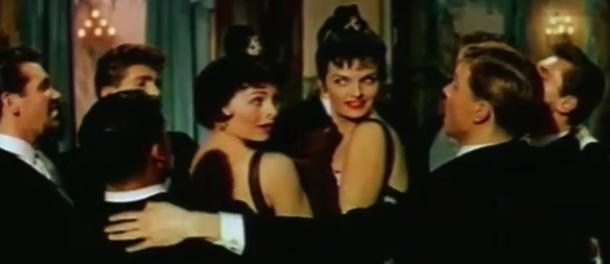
Jeanne Crain and Jane Russell in scene from film's trailer.

Bonnie and Connie Jones, played by Jane Russell and Jeanne Crain, are two sisters that live in New York working on Broadway. They are known as the second generation of the Jones sisters, taking the name after their mother, Mitzi Jones, who also performed popularly with her sister, Mimi Jones.

Bonnie and Connie are often offered engagements by men. Connie refuses these New Yorkers every time, while her sister Bonnie seemingly cannot say no to all these men’s offerings. This initiates fights between the men outside the sisters’ shows, and these situations embarrass Connie for being related to Bonnie.

The sisters fight about Bonnie’s weakness to refuse these men. Connie wants her sister to promise her to refuse them for the sake of their career. However, the moment the sisters reconcile, a messenger knocks on their door with an offer by David Action to perform in shows around France.

The sisters immediately agree, and promise each other to focus on the success of their career rather than focusing on desperate men looking for marriage. When they arrive in Paris, they are welcomed by Charlie Biddle and David Action, played by Alan Young and Scott Brady, who will later become the sisters’ love interests.

The men are surprised by the difference between the first generation and the second generation of the Jones sisters. They notice that Bonnie and Connie lack the lush living style of their mother and act more sophisticated. The sisters claim that they do not own a lot because of financial problems; it took them three months of savings to buy an average looking dress for their shows.

The girls open their luggage to get ready for a cocktail party; however, their only dress is a cheetah printed dress which to Rudy is not appropriate to wear in the afternoon for the press. They want to be able to show off the new Jones sisters properly, and therefore, they remodel the dresses to impress Paris just like the first generation of the Jones sisters. The cocktail party goes extremely well. Men are dancing and the girls have the attention of the whole room. Their popularity and names go all around Paris, which helps their career.

The next day, the Jones sisters want to tour the city of Paris and plead with David and Charlie to show them around. They separate into two groups, Connie leaving with Charlie and Bonnie leaving with David. These quickly turn into dates in the city of Paris, as both couples share kisses and reveal their attraction towards one another. However, Bonnie’s relationship with David is complicated because David fears to give himself away to another person. He would rather stay a bachelor, which is what he calls himself.

But as love is growing between the two groups, so is the sisters’ career. Parisian casinos desire to have them perform for their nighttime show. But the girls refuse most of them as the casino provides them with vulgar attire. For their own dignity, Bonnie and Connie refuse to show their bodies off for the enjoyment of others. Although most of the casinos refuse to give them proper attire, the girls find their way around this and hide their bodies from the audience using a hat with long feathers the casino provided them with. They not only performed and received their well-earned money, but received more attention in France, allowing them to perform in Monte Carlo the next evening.

The girls perform beautifully at their next and unexpectedly last show of the movie. Their mother, Mitzi, is unhappy with the circumstances her daughter are in, and she forces them to come home to New York with her. After her show days, Bonnie and Connie have claimed that their mother has raised them strictly. She especially does not want her daughters to display themselves vulgarly, which is why she forcefully brings them back home.

Grabbing them by the ears, she puts them in a taxi car leaving the Monte Carlo Casino. After seeing the love of their lives leave, David and Charlie know that they cannot bear living the rest of their lives without the sisters and they decide to chase after them. The movie ends with Charlie and David running to the boat taking off for New York looking for the Jones sisters. The moment they meet again, Charlie proposes to Connie, and David pleads to be forgiven by Bonnie for refusing her in the beginning of their relationship. Bonnie, of course, forgives David who then takes action and proposes to her. The movie ends with two newly and happily engaged couples taking off on a boat to New York.

== Cast ==
- Jane Russell as Bonnie Jones / Mimi Jones
- Jeanne Crain as Connie Jones / Mitzi Jones (singing voice was dubbed by Anita Ellis)
- Alan Young as Charlie Biddle / Mrs. Biddle / Mr. Henry Biddle
- Scott Brady as David Action (singing voice was dubbed by Robert Farnon)
- Rudy Vallee as himself
- Guy Middleton as Earl of Wickenwave
- Eric Pohlmann as M. Ballard
- Robert Favart as Hotel Manager
- Guido Lorraine as M. Marcel
- Ferdy Mayne as M. Dufond

== Musical numbers ==
The musical supervision is credited to "M.S.I." Herbert Spencer and Earle Hagen.

Incidental music composed and conducted by Robert Farnon.

- "Gentlemen Marry Brunettes" (music by Herbert Spencer and Earle Hagen, lyrics by Richard Sale) - Sung by Chorus.

(note: screen credit gives "Sung by Johnny Desmond", but the song is only heard in a male choral arrangement)

- "I Wanna Be Loved By You" (music by Herbert Stothart and Harry Ruby, lyrics by Bert Kalmar) - Sung by Jane Russell, Jeanne Crain (dubbed by Anita Ellis) and Rudy Vallee.
- "Have You Met Miss Jones?" (music by Richard Rodgers, lyrics by Lorenz Hart) - Sung by Rudy Vallee, Jane Russell, Jeanne Crain (dubbed by Anita Ellis), Scott Brady (dubbed by Robert Farnon) and Alan Young, Danced by Jane Russell and Jeanne Crain.
- "My Funny Valentine" (music by Richard Rodgers, lyrics by Lorenz Hart) - Sung by Jeanne Crain (dubbed by Anita Ellis) and Alan Young.
- "I've Got Five Dollars" (music by Richard Rodgers, lyrics by Lorenz Hart) - Sung by Jane Russell and Scott Brady (dubbed by Robert Farnon).
- "Daddy" (music & lyrics by Bobby Troup) - Sung and Danced by Jane Russell and Jeanne Crain (dubbed by Anita Ellis).
- "Miss Annabelle Lee" (music & lyrics by Sydney Clare and Lou Pollock) - Sung by Chorus, Danced by Jane Russell, Jeanne Crain and Chorus.
- "You're Driving Me Crazy" (music & lyrics by Walter Donaldson) - Sung and Danced by Jane Russell and Jeanne Crain (dubbed by Anita Ellis).
- "Ain't Misbehavin'" (music & lyrics by Thomas 'Fats' W. Waller, Harry Brooks, and Andy Razaf) - Sung and Danced by Alan Young, Jane Russell, Jeanne Crain (dubbed by Anita Ellis) and Chorus.

== Reception ==
After its release in November, the movie did not perform as well as Gentlemen Prefer Blondes. The Los Angeles Times declared that the casting of Jeanne Crain and Jane Russell was a hopeful sign, but the movie itself was filled with "dull and listless dialogue." The critique did positively review the costumes of the movie and Jeanne Crain's acting, claiming that "she had been hiding her light" from the world.

== See also ==
- List of American films of 1955
