= Malaga (1954 film) =

1954 film

- Lobby card
- Directed by: Richard Sale
- Written by: Robert Westerby
- Produced by: M. J. Frankovich
- Starring: Maureen O'Hara; Macdonald Carey; Binnie Barnes
- Cinematography: Christopher Challis
- Edited by: Bert Bates
- Music by: Benjamin Frankel
- Production company: Film Locations
- Distributed by: British Lion Films; Columbia Pictures (US)
- Release date: 9 August 1954
- Running time: 85 minutes
- Country: United Kingdom
- Language: English

Malaga is a 1954 British adventure film directed by Richard Sale and starring Maureen O'Hara, Macdonald Carey and Binnie Barnes. O'Hara appears as a former O.S.S. secret agent and Carey a smuggler. The film takes its title from Málaga in Spain where it was primarily shot on location. It was distributed in Britain by British Lion Films and by Columbia Pictures in America under the alternative title Fire Over Africa.

== Production ==
Although an international cast of primarily British and German actors was involved, American producer Mitchell "Mike" Frankovich and director Richard Sale crafted a thriller set in the international city of Tangiers. Location shooting took place around Málaga in Andalucía with studio footage shot at Shepperton Studios, London from early November to mid-December 1953. The film's sets were designed by the art directors Vincent Korda and Wilfred Shingleton.

During pre-production, Errol Flynn and Indian actress Nimmi were considered for lead roles before casting was completed. While Maureen O'Hara played a James Bond-type spy, her personal life was in turmoil after a messy custody battle following a divorce. Her casting in Malaga was instrumental in winning a court case against the tabloid Confidential. Peter Sellers reportedly dubbed at least six actors in the cast without credit, with one account listing as many as 14 roles being dubbed. One of the cast was Irish-born American actor James O'Hara, Maureen O'Hara's brother.

== Plot ==
Joanna Dane (Maureen O'Hara) is sent to Tangiers to get information on, and close down, an international smuggling ring. Dane is adept at jiu jitsu, firearms, and wisecracks that she uses on anyone who tangles with her. Her beauty, attractive outfits and skill with playing cards get her a position as a croupier at a smuggler's hangout called Frisco's, run by the hard blonde Frisco (Binnie Barnes). Joanna also is pursued by smuggler Van Logan (MacDonald Carey), who she uses by having him take her to Ali Baba's, a parfumerie run by the suspicious Mustapha (Ferdy Mayne).

During her work at Frisco's, Joanna is pestered by Danny Boy (James Lilburn), Logan's Irish assistant, who ignores her insults and warnings to let her alone. When the embarrassed Danny Boy threatens Joanna, she grabs him and throws him to the floor. Augie (Harry Lane) – another target of Joanna's surveillance—beats Danny Boy's head with his cane, knocking him unconscious. Logan fights with Augie, revealing he carries a sword cane by tossing the blade at Logan.

Joanna accompanies Logan, Danny Boy and his crew on their boat the Banshee to smuggle goods into Spain where they are hijacked by a boat led by Augie. The Banshee manages to escape but without their cargo. Logan is arrested by the Civil Guard but manages to escape with Augie unsuccessfully attempting to assassinate Joanna. Joanna tracks down the smuggling ring, shooting Logan and discovers the real head of the smuggling ring whom she has eliminated by the Civil Guard.

== Cast ==
- Maureen O'Hara as Joanna Dane
- MacDonald Carey as Van Logan
- Binnie Barnes as Frisco
- Guy Middleton as Soames Howard
- James O'Hara as Danny Boy
- Leonard Sachs as Paul Dupont
- Harry Lane as Augie
- Bruce Beeby as Potts
- Meinhart Maur as Jakie
- Hugh McDermott as Richard Farrell
- Ferdy Mayne as Mustapha
- Eric Corrie as Pebbles
- Derek Sydney as Signor Amato
- Jacques Cey as Monsieur Duclois
- Gérard Tichy as Cronkhite
- Mike Brendel as Tiger
- Antonio Casas as Aziz
- Dino Galvani as Hotel Clerk
- Harold Kasket as Police Chief
- Larry Taylor as Mustapha's Henchman

== See also ==
- List of British films of 1954
