= Mary Loos =

American actress and writer (1910–2004)

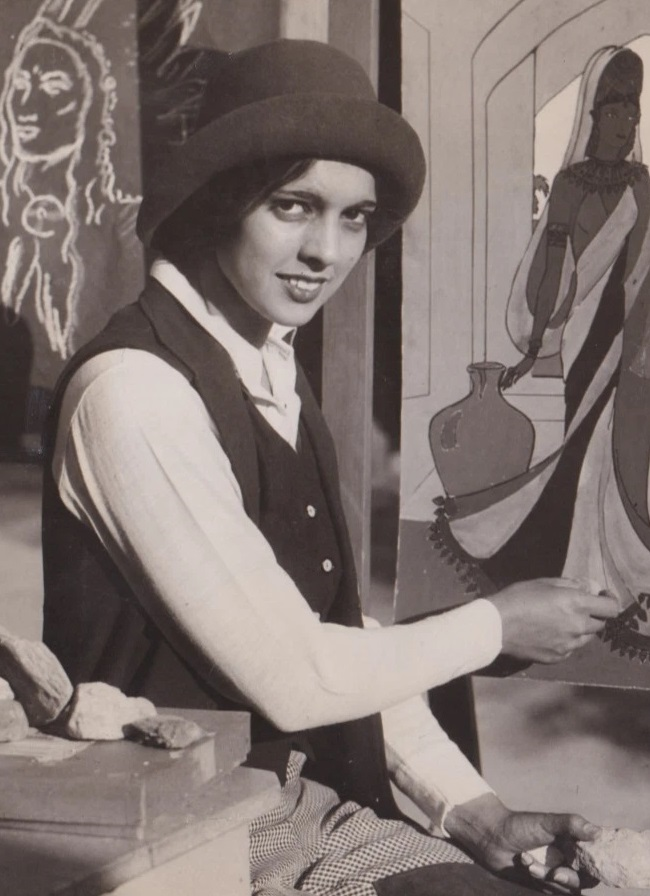
- Loos in 1930
- Born: Mary Anita Loos; May 6, 1910; San Diego
- Died: October 11, 2004 (aged 94); Monterey, California, US
- Education: Stanford University
- Occupations: Actress, writer
- Spouse(s): Richard Sale; Carl von Saltza
- Children: Edward Clifford Sale

Mary Loos (May 6, 1910 – October 11, 2004) was an American actress, screenwriter, TV writer, and novelist. She was occasionally credited under her full name, Mary Anita Loos.

Born in San Diego, she was the daughter of Dr. Clifford Loos, co-founder of the Ross-Loos Medical Clinic and the Ross-Loos Medical Group, the first health maintenance organization (HMO) in the United States. She was the niece of screenwriter Anita Loos.

Mary Loos died in Monterey, California, aged 94, due to complications following a stroke.

== Career ==
After graduating from Stanford, Loos worked in the publicity department of Fox Films. In the mid-1930s she turned to acting, and had roles in several Fox pictures. She began her career as a publicist in New York before moving out to the West Coast and working as a screenwriter in 1941. She and her first husband, Richard Sale, wrote about 20 successful screenplays together before divorcing. After working with her husband, Loos continued in the written field. She became a story editor for Mike Frankovich Productions. She was both co-creator and one of the writers for Yancy Derringer (1958-1959), an American Western TV series. Bantam Books also published some of her novels. In her lifetime she wrote four total: "The Beggars Are Coming," "Belinda," "Barstow Legend" and "Pride of Lovers."

== Second marriage ==
Later in life, she married Carl von Saltza, whom she had met decades earlier while attending Stanford University and had previously been engaged to. However, the engagement fell apart due to the economic stance of the country at the time. The couple lost contact after school when Mary's career in public relations became successful and Carl joined the U.S. Army Air Corps.

After Carl was fighting in World War II, Mary left New York to go to Hollywood, where she met her first husband, Richard Sale. In an interview, Loos claimed the marriage “was a great writing team but never a great marriage.” The marriage ended up failing and Loos left with her son Edward to Santa Monica. She continued writing creatively as a divorced mother for 20 years until May 4, 1989, when she was visiting a friend and saw the name of the man she once loved on a mailbox. She found out it was actually the Carl von Saltza from her past and they agreed to meet in Monterey. When they met again, it was instant attraction. Loos stayed the weekend for Carl's birthday weekend and she met his two sons, two daughters, five grandchildren.

After the weekend, Carl already talked about marrying Loos, and on January 6, after 50 years without any contact, the couple became official.

== Selected filmography and written screenplays ==
- Over-Exposed (1956)
- Gentlemen Marry Brunettes (1955)
- Woman's World (1954)
- The French Line (1953)
- Let's Do It Again (1953)
- Meet Me After the Show (1951)
- I'll Get By (1950)
- A Ticket to Tomahawk (1950)
- When Willie Comes Marching Home (1950)
- Father Was a Fullback (1949)
- Mr. Belvedere Goes to College (1949)
- Mother Is a Freshman (1949)
- The Dude Goes West (1948)
- The Inside Story (1948)
- Driftwood (1947)
- Hit Parade of 1947 (1947)
- Calendar Girl (1947)
- Rendezvous with Annie (1946)

== Works ==
- Anita Loos Rediscovered: Film Treatments and Fiction by Anita Loos, Creator of Gentlemen Prefer Blondes

Author: Anita Loos
Editors: Cari Beauchamp, Mary Loos
Publisher : University of California Press, 2003
ISBN 9780520228948
