= Binnie Barnes =

English actress (1903–1998)

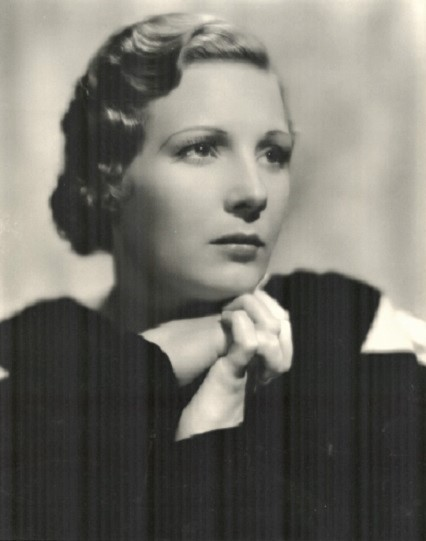
- Barnes in 1935
- Born: Gertrude Maud Barnes; 25 March 1903; Islington, London, England
- Died: 27 July 1998 (aged 95); Beverly Hills, California, U.S.
- Resting place: Forest Lawn Memorial Park, Glendale, California
- Occupation: Actress
- Years active: 1923–1973
- Spouses: Samuel Joseph (m. 1931; div. 1936); Mike Frankovich (m. 1940; died 1992)
- Children: 3
- Relatives: Rayford Barnes (nephew)

Gertrude Maud Barnes (25 March 1903 – 27 July 1998), known professionally as Binnie Barnes, was an English actress whose career in films spanned from 1923 to 1973. She was known as a leading lady in films such as The Private Life of Henry VIII, The Last of the Mohicans, and In Old California.

== Early life ==
Barnes was born in Islington, London, the daughter of Sarah Rose Noyce and George Barnes, a policeman; 16 children were in her family. Before moving to Hollywood to become an actress, Barnes worked a series of jobs, such as chorus girl, nurse, and dance hostess.

== Career ==
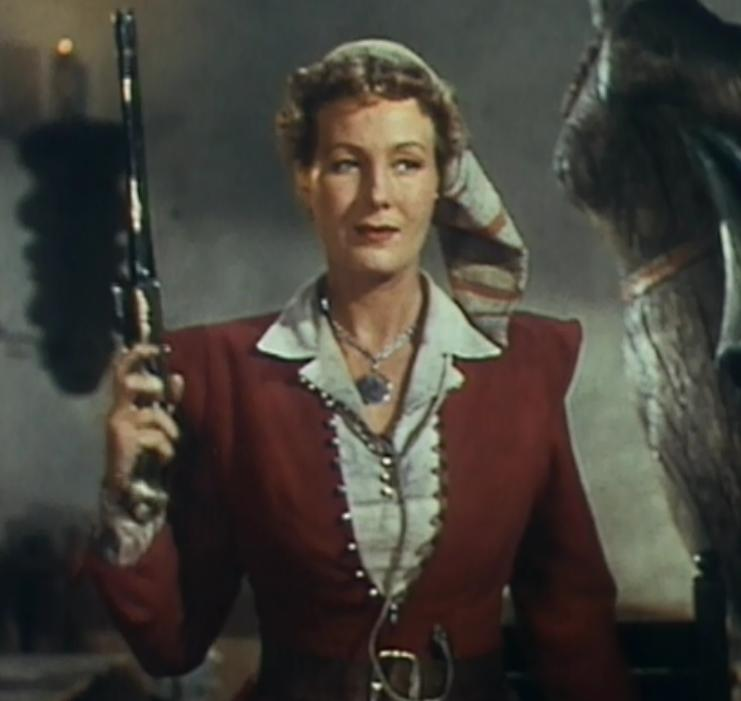
Trailer for The Spanish Main (1945)

Barnes began her acting career in films in 1923, appearing in a short film made by Lee De Forest in his Phonofilm sound-on-film process. Her film career continued in Great Britain, most notably in The Private Life of Henry VIII (1933) as Katherine Howard, Henry's fifth wife. Barnes' main qualm in accepting roles as an actress was that she not play submissive roles. Barnes once remarked, "One picture is just like another to me, as long as I don't have to be a sweet woman". After she married Mike Frankovich, she moved to Europe with Frankovich and appeared in several films he produced there, including Decameron Nights with Louis Jourdan and Malaga with Maureen O'Hara and Macdonald Carey. Later, her career continued in Hollywood, until 1973, when she appeared in the comedy 40 Carats, her last acting role.

== Personal life and death ==
Barnes's first husband was London art dealer Samuel Joseph. Her second marriage was to film producer Mike Frankovich, and later she was a naturalised United States citizen. The couple adopted three children.

Barnes was an avid swimmer. In 1936, she saved a drowning guest at William Wyler’s pool.

Binnie Barnes died on 27 July 1998 of natural causes, aged 95, in Beverly Hills. She was interred in Forest Lawn Memorial Park, Glendale.

== Hollywood Walk of Fame ==
For her contributions to the film industry, Barnes received a motion pictures star on the Hollywood Walk of Fame in 1960. Her star is located at 1501 Vine Street.

== Complete filmography ==
- Phonofilm (1923)
- A Night in Montmartre (1931) as Therese
- Love Lies (1931) as Junetta
- Doctor Josser K.C. (1931) as Rosa Wopp
- Murder at Covent Garden (1932) as Girl
- The Innocents of Chicago (1932) as Peg Guinan
- Partners Please (1932 short) as Billie
- Strip! Strip! Hooray!!! (1932 short) as Spanish Lady
- Down Our Street (1932) as Tessie Bernstein
- The Last Coupon (1932) as Mrs. Meredith
- Old Spanish Customers (1932) as Carmen
- A Taxi to Paradise (1933 short) as Joan Melhuish
- Counsel's Opinion (1933) as Leslie
- Heads We Go (1933) as Lil Pickering
- The Private Life of Henry VIII (1933) as Katherine Howard, the Fifth Wife
- The Silver Spoon (1933) as Lady Perivale
- Their Night Out (1933) as Lola
- Nine Forty-Five (1934) as Ruth Jordan
- No Escape (1934) as Myra Fengler
- The Lady Is Willing (1934) as Helene Dupont
- One Exciting Adventure (1934) as Rena Sorel
- Gift of Gab (1934) as Maid
- The Private Life of Don Juan (1934) as Rosita, a Maid Pure and Simple
- Forbidden Territory (1934) as Valerie Petrovna
- There's Always Tomorrow (1934) as Alice Vail
- Diamond Jim (1935) as Lillian Russell
- Rendezvous (1935) as Olivia Kerloff
- La Fiesta de Santa Barbara (1935, Short) as Herself
- Sutter's Gold (1936) as Countess Elizabeth Bartoffski
- Small Town Girl (1936) as Priscilla Hyde
- The Last of the Mohicans (1936) as Alice Munro
- The Magnificent Brute (1936) as Della Lane
- Three Smart Girls (1936) as Donna Lyons
- Breezing Home (1937) as Henrietta Fairfax
- Broadway Melody of 1938 (1937) as Caroline Whipple
- Out of the Blue (1937) as Rosa
- The Divorce of Lady X (1938) as Lady Mere
- The First Hundred Years (1938) as Claudia Weston
- The Adventures of Marco Polo (1938) as Nazama
- Holiday (1938) as Mrs. Laura Cram
- Three Blind Mice (1938) as Miriam Harrington
- Always Goodbye (1938) as Harriet Martin
- Tropic Holiday (1938) as Marilyn Joyce
- Gateway (1938) as Mrs. Fay Sims
- Thanks for Everything (1938) as Kay Swift
- The Three Musketeers (1939) as Milady De Winter
- Wife, Husband and Friend (1939) as Cecil Carver
- Man About Town (1939) as Lady Arlington
- Frontier Marshal (1939) as Jerry
- Day-Time Wife (1939) as Blanche
- 'Til We Meet Again (1940) as Comtesse de Bresac
- This Thing Called Love (1940) as Charlotte Campbell
- Angels with Broken Wings (1941) as Sybil Barton
- Tight Shoes (1941) as Sybil Ash
- The Great Awakening (1941, aka New Wine) as Countess Marie Duvarre
- Three Girls About Town (1941) as Faith Banner
- Skylark (1941) as Myrtle Vantine
- Call Out the Marines (1942) as Violet 'Vi' Hall
- In Old California (1942) as Lacey Miller
- I Married an Angel (1942) as Peggy
- The Man from Down Under (1943) as Aggie Dawlins
- Up in Mabel's Room (1944) as Alicia Larchmont
- The Hour Before the Dawn (1944) as May Heatherton
- Barbary Coast Gent (1944) as Lil Damish
- It's in the Bag! (1945) as Eve Floogle
- The Spanish Main (1945) as Anne Bonney
- Getting Gertie's Garter (1945) as Barbara
- The Time of Their Lives (1946) as Mildred Dean
- If Winter Comes (1947) as Natalie Bagshaw
- The Dude Goes West (1948) as Kiki Kelly
- My Own True Love (1948) as Geraldine
- The Pirates of Capri (1949, aka The Masked Pirate) as Queen Maria Carolina
- Fugitive Lady (1950) as Esther Clementi
- Shadow of the Eagle (1950) as Catherine, Empress of Russia
- Decameron Nights (1953) as Contessa di Firenze / Nerina the Chambermaid / The Old Witch
- Malaga (1954) as Frisco
- The Trouble with Angels (1966) as Sister Celestine
- Where Angels Go, Trouble Follows (1968) as Sister Celestine
- 40 Carats (1973) as Maud Ericson
