= Driftwood (1947 film) =

1947 film by Allan Dwan

- Directed by: Allan Dwan
- Written by: Mary Loos; Richard Sale
- Produced by: Allan Dwan
- Starring: Ruth Warrick; Walter Brennan; Dean Jagger; Charlotte Greenwood; Natalie Wood
- Cinematography: John Alton
- Edited by: Arthur Roberts
- Music by: Nathan Scott; Cy Feuer
- Production company: Republic Pictures
- Distributed by: Republic Pictures
- Release date: September 15, 1947
- Running time: 88 minutes
- Country: United States
- Language: English

Driftwood is a 1947 American drama film produced and directed by Allan Dwan and starring Ruth Warrick, Walter Brennan, Dean Jagger and Charlotte Greenwood. The movie also features Natalie Wood as a little orphan girl who adopts a collie. It was produced by Republic Pictures, the largest Hollywood company outside the major studios, as a more prestigious release than the low-budget westerns and crime films that Republic specialized in.

== Plot ==
Rev. J. Hollingsworth delivers a sermon from the pulpit of his church, as his granddaughter Jenny Hollingsworth listens with rapt attention. When he begins to falter, Jenny helps him out by continuing a quotation from scripture that he had begun, but he is soon unable to continue. She is the only member of the congregation. The priest then dies.

Jenny sees an airplane with one engine on fire, descending, followed by an explosion. Soon after the crash, a collie appears, and begins walking with Jenny. Dr. Steve Webster pulls up in his Jeep, and Jenny spends the night with him in the home that he shares with Murph, the local pharmacist. Murph is initially somewhat upset when he discovers Jenny sleeping on the sofa the next morning, with the dog at her side. Dr. Webster is conducting research on Rocky Mountain spotted fever, and keeps a number of infected ticks on his porch. He has also applied for a grant to teach and study at an institute in San Francisco.

Steve takes Jenny to meet his friend Susan Moore, who lives with Mathilda. Mathilda calls Steve a hopeless dreamer, and says that Susan is silly to continue waiting for him to propose to her. Jenny, who has grown up with her great-grandfather in isolation, has been taught that it is important to tell the truth. She tells Mathilda what she thinks of her, along with some of what Murph has told her, resulting in Mathilda becoming upset and directing Steve to remove Jenny and the dog. Steve takes Jenny to Murph's pharmacy for a sundae, but the place is crowded with local children waiting to get into the movie house next door. Some of them bully Jenny, including the mayor's son. Murph has a large stock of Rocky Mountain spotted fever vaccine, but Steve has not been able to convince the locals to inoculate their children.

Steve is called away to attend to a sick boy, Clem Perkins, who has contracted the fever. Steve tells Clem's father that there is no cure for the disease, and that he must simply wait and hope for the best. While Webster is away, the mayor's son threatens Jenny, but the dog chases him away and pulls down his pants. Back at Murph and Steve's home, the mayor shows up with a gun, saying he is going to shoot the dog. Steve throws the mayor out, but the mayor stumbles and falls on the porch, freeing the infected ticks. Sheriff Bolton comes to seize the dog, saying that the dog will be given a fair trial, but must remain in jail until then. After Clem dies, the parents in town send their children to Steve's house to be vaccinated. Steve starts to vaccinate Jenny, who was bitten by one of the ticks, but is interrupted before completing the procedure.

The dog's trial takes place. Steve is unavailable to act as defense attorney, so Murph takes over. The mayor and his counsel insist that the dog bit the mayor's son. Jenny testifies, but is unable to persuade the judge that the dog is innocent. The judge initially rules that the dog must be put down. However, Steve shows up, and insists that the mayor's son receive a medical examination to determine the extent of his alleged injuries. Murph, Steve and the judge agree that he shows no sign of injuries to his posterior. The judge then reverses his decision, but declares that the dog must be kept under observation at the jail to ensure that he is not diseased. Jenny falls ill, and Steve confirms that she has the fever.

Steve learns about the plane crash, and discovers that the plane was carrying a dog to Colorado for use in creating a serum to cure Rocky Mountain spotted fever, since the dog had recovered from the disease and had developed powerful antibodies. They conclude that Jenny's dog is that dog, and that Steve and Murph can make a serum from its blood. They do not know how much of the serum to give her, though, so they contact the institute responsible for the dog and the serum—the same institute to which Steve had applied. However they are told that Dr. Nicholas Adams is the only person who can answer their question, and he cannot be reached, since he is driving to Colorado. Steve asks the local radio station to broadcast an emergency alert. Dr. Adams hears it, and calls, and they found out the correct dosage just in time to administer the serum and cure Jenny.

Dr. Adams then arrives. He awards Steve a $5,000 grant to continue his studies. Steve announces that he will stay in town, marry Susan, and adopt Jenny.

== Cast ==
- Ruth Warrick as Susan Moore
- Walter Brennan as Murph
- Dean Jagger as Dr. Steve Webster
- Charlotte Greenwood as Mathilda
- Natalie Wood as Jenny Hollingsworth
- Jerome Cowan as Mayor Snyder
- H. B. Warner as Rev. J. Hollingsworth / "Grandpappy"
- Margaret Hamilton as Essie Keenan
- Hobart Cavanaugh as Judge Beckett
- Francis Ford as Abner Green
- Alan Napier as Dr. Nicholas Adams
- Howland Chamberlain as Hiram Trumbell
- James Bell as Sheriff Bolton
- Teddy Infuhr as Lester Snyder
- James Kirkwood as Rev. MacDougal
- Ray Teal as Clem Perkins

== Critical response ==
On February 1, 2018, Richard Brody of The New Yorker praised Driftwood as an "electrifying, eccentric masterwork" from director Allan Dwan, a film that has a "near-journalistic devotion to detail" and "both typifies and expands Dwan’s core inspiration: his dramatization of a thick tangle of social connections and conflicting lines of power and passion that seemingly bring the town itself to life along with its individual characters." Brody also commented that the character of Jenny Hollingsworth is "one of the most idiosyncratic and original child characters I’ve seen in a Hollywood movie".

== Restoration ==
A new restoration of Driftwood by Paramount Pictures, The Film Foundation, and Martin Scorsese was screened at the Museum of Modern Art (MoMA) on February 2, 2018. The screening was part of the museum's program of showcasing 30 restored films from the library of Republic Pictures curated by Scorsese.
