= Calendar Girl (1947 film) =

1947 film by Allan Dwan

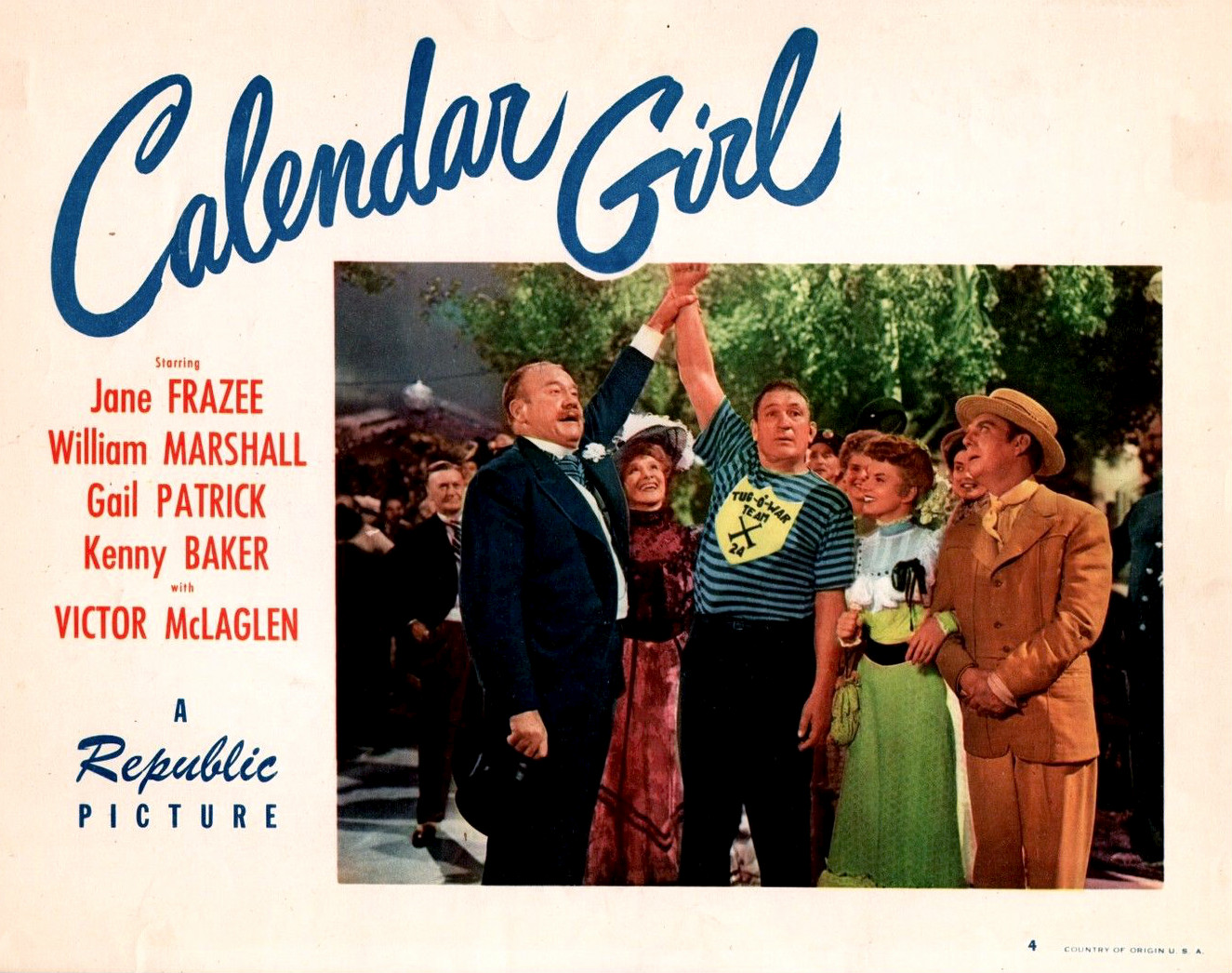
- Lobby card
- Directed by: Allan Dwan
- Screenplay by: Mary Loos; Richard Sale; Lee Loeb
- Produced by: Allan Dwan
- Starring: Jane Frazee; William Marshall; Gail Patrick; Kenny Baker; Victor McLaglen
- Cinematography: Reggie Lanning
- Edited by: Fred Allen
- Music by: Score: Nathan Scott; Songs: Jimmy McHugh (music); Harold Adamson (lyrics)
- Production company: Republic Pictures
- Distributed by: Republic Pictures
- Release date: January 31, 1947 (United States)
- Running time: 88 minutes
- Country: United States
- Language: English

Calendar Girl is a 1947 American historical romantic musical film directed by Allan Dwan and starring Jane Frazee, William Marshall and Gail Patrick. The movie was written by Lee Loeb, Mary Loos, and Richard Sale, The supporting cast featured Kenny Baker, Victor McLaglen and Irene Rich. This was Patrick's last film before retiring from acting in the wake of her marriage. It was produced and distributed by Republic Pictures. It was later reissued under the alternative title Star Dust and Sweet Music.

== Plot ==
The film tells the story of two best friends from Boston who come to Greenwich Village in 1900, one to become a famous artist, the other to become a famous composer. The composer falls in love with the girl next door, but she is intrigued by his friend, who has secrets he feels he doesn't need to share with her.

== Cast ==
- Jane Frazee as Patricia O'Neill
- William Marshall as Johnny Bennett
- Gail Patrick as Olivia Radford
- Kenny Baker as Byron Jones
- Victor McLaglen as Matthew O'Neill
- Irene Rich as Lulu Varden
- James Ellison as Steve Adams
- Janet Martin as Tessie
- Franklin Pangborn as 'Dilly' Dillingsworth
- Gus Schilling as Ed Gaskin
- Charles Arnt as Capt. Olsen
- Lou Nova as Clancy
- Emory Parnell as The Mayor
- Gino Corrado as Tony the Cook
- Ethelreda Leopold as Rosie O'Grady

== Bibliography ==
- Lombardi, Frederic. Allan Dwan and the Rise and Decline of the Hollywood Studios. McFarland, 2013.
