= Jay Blackton =

American composer and conductor

- Born: Jacob Schwartzdorf; March 25, 1909; New York, U.S.
- Died: January 8, 1994 (aged 84); Granada Hills, California, U.S.
- Occupations: Composer, conductor
- Spouse: Louise Blackton
- Children: 2

Jay Blackton (March 25, 1909 – January 8, 1994) was an American composer and conductor. In 1956 he won an Academy Award in the category Best Scoring of a Musical Picture for the film Oklahoma! and was also nominated for Guys and Dolls. He was the music director, orchestrator or arranger for more than 25 Broadway productions and national tours.

Born Jay Schwartzdorf in New York City, he studied piano and conducting at the Juilliard School. He began his career in opera, as an assistant conductor at New York Opera Comique and then as the conductor at St. Louis Municipal Opera from 1937 to 1942. In 1943 Rodgers and Hammerstein hired him to orchestrate and conduct Oklahoma! on Broadway, and he followed this engagement as music director and often orchestrator or arranger of such musicals as Annie Get Your Gun, Call Me Madam, Guys and Dolls, Hello, Dolly! and George M!. In addition, he toured with Bob Hope and others.

Blackton died in January 1994 of heart failure at the Granada Hills Community Hospital in Granada Hills, California, at the age of 84.

== Selected filmography ==
- The Merry Widow (1952)
- Oklahoma! (1955; co-won with Robert Russell Bennett and Adolph Deutsch)
- Guys and Dolls (1955; co-nominated with Cyril J. Mockridge)
- Androcles and the Lion (1967)
