= Mr. Belvedere Goes to College =

1949 film by Elliott Nugent

- Theatrical release poster
- Directed by: Elliott Nugent
- Written by: Mary Loos; Mary C. McCall, Jr. Richard Sale
- Produced by: Samuel G. Engel
- Starring: Clifton Webb; Shirley Temple; Tom Drake
- Cinematography: Lloyd Ahern
- Edited by: Harmon Jones
- Music by: Alfred Newman
- Distributed by: Twentieth Century-Fox
- Release date: April 15, 1949
- Running time: 83 minutes
- Country: United States
- Language: English
- Box office: $3,650,000

Mr. Belvedere Goes to College is a 1949 American comedy film directed by Elliott Nugent. The screenplay written by Mary Loos, Mary C. McCall, Jr., and Richard Sale was based on characters created by Gwen Davenport. It follows on from Sitting Pretty (1948), and had a sequel, Mr. Belvedere Rings the Bell (1951). The film focuses on prickly genius Lynn Belvedere (Clifton Webb) who enrolls in a major university with the intention of obtaining a four-year degree in only one year.

== Plot ==
Lynn Belvedere, though the successful author of a scandalous, best-selling book titled Hummingbird Hill (as described in Sitting Pretty), has not benefited financially, as he has had to fight many libel suits as a result. He has been awarded a literary prize from a foundation. One requirement for the $10,000 prize is that he be a college graduate.

To meet that requirement, Belvedere decides to enroll at Clemens University. The president of the university allows him to do so, on condition that he not do anything publicly detrimental to the institution. Belvedere intends to complete the four-year program in a single year, even though he has no formal education. He passes the entrance exams with flying colors because he is a self-taught genius.

He is assigned to share a dorm room with freshman Corny Whittaker and bossy sophomore Avery Brubaker. A fellow student who writes for the school paper, Ellen Baker, wants to interview him, but he declines.

Belvedere gets a job as a food server at a sorority house from student job coordinator Bill Chase. Bill is interested in Ellen, and later at a dinner he introduces her to his mother, who is in charge of the sorority where he works. Belvedere corrects the girls' behavior and etiquette at dinner.

Belvedere is punished for shaving during "Whisker Week": he has to wear a fake beard until further notice. Ellen takes a photo of him in the beard for an article she is writing. The article includes quotes from Belvedere that displease the university greatly, even though Belvedere states they were not intended for publication and plans to sue Ellen and the university. Instead, Belvedere advises Ellen not to publish pure gossip in future and not to submit another, longer article to Look magazine.

As the relationship between Bill and Ellen deepens, she introduces him to her young son, Davy. She tells Bill that she is a war widow. He is taken aback, but after thinking it over, he decides he loves her, they reconcile, and become engaged.

When Ellen gets a cool reception from Bill's mother, she believes that Mr. Belvedere has told Mrs. Chase about her son—actually, her cover was blown by chatty Avery Brubaker (Alan Young). Upset with Belvedere, Ellen decides to send her article about him to Look magazine. Bill pleads with her not to, but she refuses to listen. Mr. Belvedere tries to talk to her, but she will not let him in her apartment. He climbs the fire escape and sneaks in through a window. Two patrol officers see him, find him in her apartment and arrest him, believing he is a Peeping Tom. Ellen lies, claiming not to know Belvedere. Ellen later feels guilty and has Mr. Belvedere released from the city jail. He convinces Ellen reconcile with Bill.

Mr. Belvedere does complete his degree in one year, and he is also the class valedictorian. In the final scene, as the President of Clemens hands Mr. Belvedere his degree, he hands the president a rolled up magazine. The president unrolls it to find that it is the latest edition of Look, with a photo of Mr. Belvedere receiving his degree on the cover, and the lead article shown on the cover is Ellen's. Belvedere then breaks the fourth wall and smiles knowingly at the audience.

== Cast ==
- Clifton Webb as Lynn Belvedere
- Shirley Temple as Ellen Baker
- Tom Drake as Bill Chase
- Alan Young as Avery Brubaker
- Jessie Royce Landis as Mrs. Chase
- Kathleen Hughes as Kay Nelson
- Taylor Holmes as Dr. Gibbs, the dean of the university
- Alvin Greenman as Cornelius Whittaker
- Paul Harvey as Dr. Keating, the president of the university
- Barry Kelley as Police Sergeant Griggs
- Robert Patten as Joe Fisher
- Jeff Chandler as Pratt
- Kathleen Freeman as Gwendolyn (uncredited)

== Production ==
Jeff Chandler has a small role. He says he played "the bigger of two cops".

This film marks Shirley Temple's return to 20th Century-Fox.

The University of Nevada, Reno's campus was the filming location for the fictitious Clemens University.

== Bibliography ==
- Windeler, Robert (1992) [1978], The Films of Shirley Temple, Carol Publishing Group, pp. 246–7
