= Meet Me After the Show =

1951 film by Richard Sale

- Directed by: Richard Sale
- Screenplay by: Mary Loos; Richard Sale
- Story by: Erna Lazarus; Scott Darling
- Produced by: George Jessel
- Starring: Betty Grable; Macdonald Carey; Rory Calhoun
- Cinematography: Arthur E. Arling
- Edited by: J. Watson Webb, Jr.
- Music by: Ken Darby; Songs by Jule Styne (music) and Leo Robin (lyrics)
- Distributed by: Twentieth-Century Fox
- Release date: August 15, 1951 (New York)
- Running time: 87 minutes
- Country: United States
- Language: English
- Box office: $2 million (US rentals)

Meet Me After the Show is a 1951 Technicolor musical film directed by Richard Sale and starring Betty Grable and Macdonald Carey.

== Plot ==
Delilah Lee is groomed by her husband Jeff Ames for his new Broadway show. She becomes such a success that she feels that Jeff considers her more an asset than a wife. When the show's backer Gloria Carstairs makes advances toward Jeff, Delilah leaves him, but she later experiences regret and resolves to regain his love. She devises a scheme involving amnesia to lure Jeff back to her.

== Cast ==
- Betty Grable as Delilah Lee
- Macdonald Carey as Jeff Ames
- Rory Calhoun as David Hemingway
- Eddie Albert as Chris Leeds
- Fred Clark as Timothy 'Tim' Wayne
- Lois Andrews as Gloria Carstairs
- Irene Ryan as Tillie
- Gwen Verdon as Sappho
- Arthur Walge as No-Talent Joe

== Production ==
The film's music was composed by Jule Styne with lyrics by Leo Robin. Gwen Verdon appears uncredited as a singer and dancer in some of the numbers, including "No-Talent Joe" and "I Feel Like Dancing". Three songs from the film appeared on her only solo album, The Girl I Left Home For (1955).

== Reception ==
In a contemporary review for The New York Times, critic Howard Thompson wrote: "Miss Grable may be a charter member of the bubble gum school of acting and her vehicles are usually standard excuses for stringing together some vaudeville specialties, granted. But there's no denying that the sight of this curvaceous, platinum-topped dynamo, sprayed in Technicolor and singing and hoofing as though she were having the time of her life, is still something for anybody's sore eyes. A blessed good thing, too, in the case of the new production. While scenarists Richard Sale, who also directed, and Mary Loos manage to pep it up now and then with some blistering wisecracks. they've concocted a feigned case of amnesia for each of the stars that makes the plot as lumpy as oatmeal."
