= James O'Rear =

American film, stage and television actor

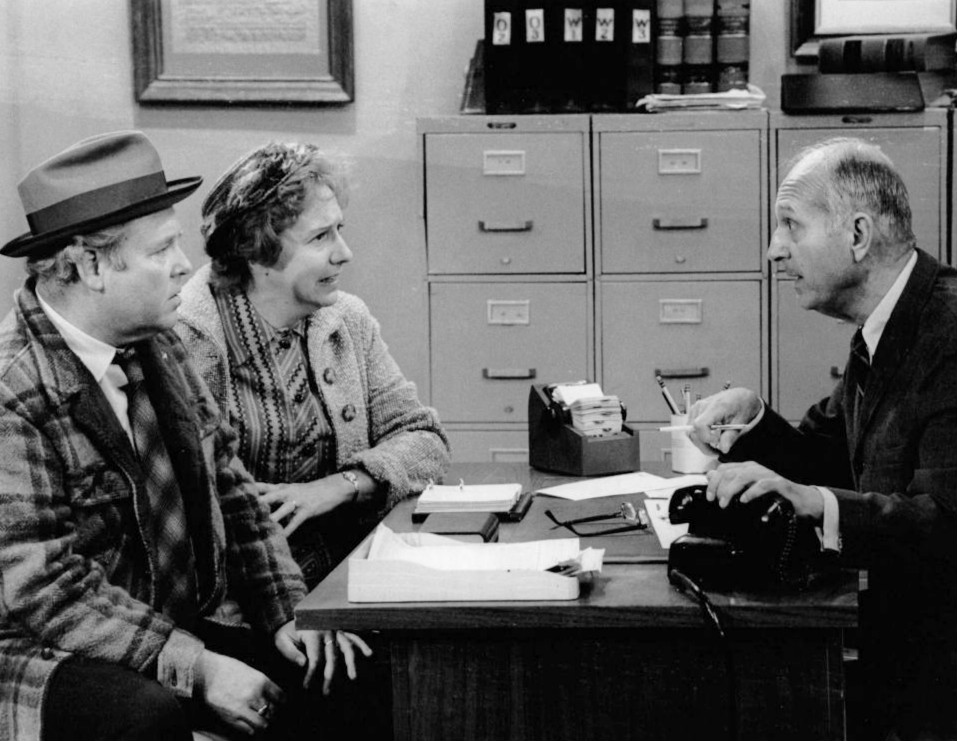
- O'Rear (right) with Carroll O'Connor and Jean Stapleton in All in the Family, 1973
- Born: January 4, 1914; Frankfort, Indiana, U.S.
- Died: June 20, 2000 (aged 86); Los Angeles, California, U.S.
- Occupations: Film, stage and television actor

James O'Rear (January 4, 1914 – June 20, 2000) was an American film, stage and television actor.

== Life and career ==
O'Rear was born in Frankfort, Indiana. He began his stage career in 1938, appearing in the stage play The Shoemakers' Holiday. He appeared in such other plays as Eight O'Clock Tuesday, The Happy Time, The World We Make, My Heart's in the Highlands, A Loss of Roses and Glamour Preferred, and from 1941 to 1945, he served in the United States Army. He began his screen career in 1947, appearing in the film The Sea of Grass. In the same year, he appeared in the films My Brother Talks to Horses and Brute Force.

Later in his career, O'Rear made his television debut in the CBS crime drama television series Casey, Crime Photographer. He guest-starred in television programs including Gunsmoke, The Andy Griffith Show, That Girl, The Real McCoys, All in the Family, Medic and Big Town. He also appeared in films such as Over-Exposed (as Roy Carver), The Search for Bridey Murphy, Bus Stop, Somebody Up There Likes Me, Chinatown and Mister Buddwing. During his screen career, in 1952, he directed the stage play The Voice of the Turtle.

O'Rear retired from acting in 1975, last appearing in the television film Guilty or Innocent: The Sam Sheppard Murder Case.

== Death ==
O'Rear died of natural causes in Los Angeles, California on June 20, 2000, at the age of 86.
