= The Inside Story (film) =

1948 film by Allan Dwan

- Theatrical release poster
- Directed by: Allan Dwan
- Screenplay by: Mary Loos; Richard Sale
- Story by: Ernest Lehman; Geza Herczeg
- Produced by: Allan Dwan
- Starring: Marsha Hunt; William Lundigan; Charles Winninger; Gail Patrick; Gene Lockhart; Florence Bates
- Cinematography: Reggie Lanning
- Edited by: Arthur Roberts
- Music by: Nathan Scott
- Production company: Republic Pictures
- Distributed by: Republic Pictures
- Release date: March 14, 1948
- Running time: 87 minutes
- Country: United States
- Language: English

The Inside Story is a 1948 American comedy drama film directed by Allan Dwan and written by Mary Loos and Richard Sale. The film stars Marsha Hunt, William Lundigan, Charles Winninger, Gail Patrick, Gene Lockhart and Florence Bates. The film was released on March 14, 1948 by Republic Pictures.

== Synopsis ==
In the small Vermont town of Silver Creek in 1933, six residents find themselves in some kind of a predicament because the government had declared a bank holiday to put a stop to the runs on banks across the country. By a curious turn of events, ten $100 bills are put in an inn's safe. Innkeeper Horace Taylor finds them and concludes they are payments from his debtors. He immediately pays off his own debts -- only to be told later by his clerk, Uncle Ed, that the money belonged to a guest at the inn. Taylor begins a frantic effort to trace and regain the money, which is merrily circulating around the town, solving the immediate problems of storekeeper J. J. Johnson, his landlady, Geraldine Atherton, a lawyer, Tom O'Connor and his wife Audrey, and an artist, Waldo Williams and his fiancée Francie Taylor, the inn-keeper's daughter. Plus, two bootleggers are conducting their own search for the money. As Taylor trails the elusive money, the individual dramas of the various possessors are revealed. "Money is like blood, it needs to circulate," says Uncle Ed.

== Cast ==
- Marsha Hunt as Francine Taylor
- William Lundigan as Waldo 'Bill' Williams
- Charles Winninger as Uncle Ed
- Gail Patrick as Audrey O'Connor
- Gene Lockhart as Horace Taylor
- Florence Bates as Geraldine Atherton
- Hobart Cavanaugh as Mason
- Allen Jenkins as Eddie
- Roscoe Karns as Eustace Peabody
- Robert Shayne as T.W. 'Tom' O'Connor
- Will Wright as J.J. Johnson
- William Haade as Rocky
- Frank Ferguson as Eph
- Tom Fadden as Ab Follansbee
