= Let's Do It Again (1953 film) =

1953 film by Alexander Hall

- Theatrical release poster
- Directed by: Alexander Hall
- Written by: Mary Loos; Richard Sale
- Based on: The Awful Truth; 1922 play by Arthur Richman
- Produced by: Oscar Saul
- Starring: Jane Wyman; Ray Milland; Aldo Ray
- Cinematography: Charles Lawton Jr.
- Edited by: Charles Nelson
- Music by: George Duning
- Production company: Columbia Pictures
- Distributed by: Columbia Pictures
- Release date: July 17, 1953
- Running time: 95 minutes
- Country: United States
- Language: English
- Box office: $1.25 million (US)

Let's Do It Again is a 1953 American Technicolor musical film set in 1950 New York, and released by Columbia Pictures. The film was directed by Alexander Hall and starred Jane Wyman, Ray Milland, Aldo Ray, and Tom Helmore. It is the story of a composer's wife (Wyman) who tries to make him (Milland) jealous, but the ploy backfires and leads to divorce.

This film is a reworking of a stage play by Arthur Richman, The Awful Truth (1922), which was previously filmed under the title in 1925, 1929, and 1937. The last version features Irene Dunne and Cary Grant in the leads. The lyrics for the musical numbers were written by Ned Washington.

== Plot ==
Actress Connie Stuart tells her husband, composer Gary Stuart, that she spent an evening in a country inn with rival composer Courtney Craig. He accuses her of infidelity. She, in turn, accuses him of adultery with dancer Lilly Adair. The couple divorce.

Several weeks pass as the couple waits out the 60-day period for the divorce decree to be final. One day, Gary goes to Connie's apartment to speak to her about retrieving his piano, as a hole must be cut in the wall to get it out. He discovers she has agreed to appear in Courtney's new play. Her performance draws the attention of uranium mining millionaire Frank McGraw, and they begin dating. Gary, jealous of Courtney but unwilling to admit he still loves Connie, bribes his piano movers to take their time so that he can repeatedly visit Connie.

Gary's brother, Chet, tells Gary that Connie is seeing the miner Frank, not the playwright Courtney. Gary spends the night at Connie's, composing a song for her in an attempt to win her back. When Frank shows up at dawn and sees Gary at Connie's, he assumes Connie is two-timing him.

Gary's new musical is a hit, but he is morose without Connie as the star. Chet tells him that Connie's claim about spending the night with Courtney in a country inn was a fabrication designed to make Gary jealous. Deciding to marry Connie to get her away from Gary, Frank goes to Connie's apartment to propose. Courtney attempts to prevent the engagement; he arrives before Frank, but Connie shoos him into the bedroom. Gary shows up moments later, furious to find Courtney there. Frank arrives to propose marriage, while Gary and Courtney fight in the bedroom. Frank withdraws his proposal of marriage and dumps Connie when he finds the two men exchanging blows.

After finding Courtney at Connie's, Gary remains convinced Connie committed adultery. He now begins dating socialite Deborah Randolph.

Connie finally gets Gary to come to her apartment to get the piano out. While there, Gary telephones Deborah. Connie attempts to interfere in their relationship by singing a romantic song. Deborah overhears the woman's voice, and Gary claims that it is his sister doing the singing. "Gary's sister" then dupes Deborah into hosting a party for Gary and inviting her. Connie shows up at the party in a fashionable gown and sings for the guests. Deborah, realizing that "Gary's sister" is really Connie, tells Gary to go back to his wife. Gary realizes he was a fool to show interest in Lilly Adair. With only minutes before the divorce decree goes into effect, Connie admits she has always been faithful and Gary pledges renewed fidelity to her. They embrace and resume their marriage.

== Cast ==
- Jane Wyman as Constance "Connie" Stuart
- Ray Milland as Gary Stuart
- Aldo Ray as Frank McGraw
- Leon Ames as Chet Stuart
- Valerie Bettis as Lilly Adair
- Tom Helmore as Courtney Craig
- Karin Booth as Deborah Randolph
- Mary Treen as Nelly - the Maid
- Dick Wessel as Ajax Moving Man
- Kathryn Givney as Mrs. Randolph
- Herbert Heyes as Mr. Randolph
- Franklyn Farnum as Courtney
- Alphonse Martell as Pierre
- Herb Vigran as Charlie Foster
