= Richard Sale (director) =

American screenwriter and film director (1911–1993)

- Born: December 17, 1911; New York City, U.S.
- Died: March 4, 1993 (aged 81); Los Angeles, California, U.S.
- Education: Washington and Lee University
- Occupations: Film director, writer
- Spouse(s): Mary Loos (1946); Irma Foster (1971)
- Children: 3

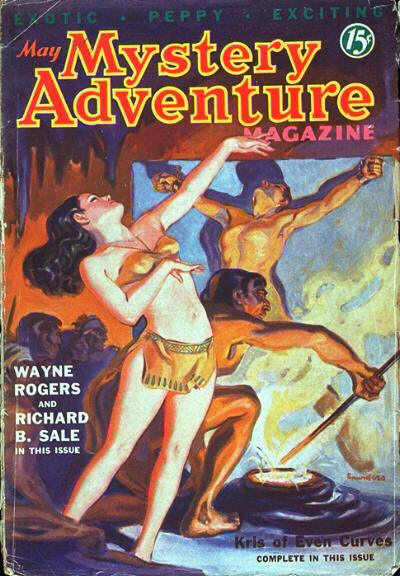
Sale's "Rescued by Satan" was cover-featured on Mystery Adventure in 1936

Richard Sale (December 17, 1911 in New York – March 4, 1993 in Los Angeles) was an American screenwriter, pulp writer, and film director.

== Career ==
Born in New York City, Sale was educated at Washington and Lee University.

Sale started his career writing as a freelance writer for pulps in the Thirties, appearing regularly in Detective Fiction Weekly (with the Daffy Dill series), Argosy, Double Detective, and a number of other magazines. In the Forties, he graduated to slick publications like The Country Gentleman, All American Fiction, and The Saturday Evening Post. In the 1930s, Sale was one of the highest-paid pulp writers. In the mid-Forties to mid-Fifties, he made a career change from writing magazine fiction to screenplays. He became a writer for Paramount pictures, a writer-director for Republic Pictures, 20th Century-Fox, British Lion, United Artists, and Columbia pictures. He also became a television writer, director, and producer for Columbia Broadcasting System.

Sale's 1936 novel Not Too Narrow, Not Too Deep was filmed as Strange Cargo (1940) starring Joan Crawford and Clark Gable.

He directed several films, including A Ticket to Tomahawk (1950), Meet Me After the Show (1951) with Betty Grable, Let's Make It Legal (1951) featuring one of Marilyn Monroe's earliest film appearances, Malaga (1954), and Gentlemen Marry Brunettes (1955) with Jane Russell. He also wrote many screenplays, Suddenly (1954), The French Line (1954) and Gentlemen Marry Brunettes, both with Mary Loos, his wife at the time, The Oscar (1966), The White Buffalo (1977) and Assassination (1987). Alongside his work for many production companies, Sale wrote over 400 short stories.

Together with Mary Loos, he created the Western television series Yancy Derringer which ran for one season in 1958–59.

Sale died in 1993 after complications from two strokes.

== Selected screenplay filmography ==
- Strange Cargo (1936) (novel)
- Find the Witness (1937)
- The Dude Goes West (1938)
- Shadows over Shanghai (1938)
- Rendezvous with Annie (1946)
- Calendar Girl (1947)
- Northwest Outpost (1947)
- Driftwood (1947)
- The Inside Story (1948)
- Campus Honeymoon (1948)
- The Tender Years (1948)
- Lady at Midnight (1948)
- Mother Is a Freshman (1949)
- Mr. Belvedere Goes to College (1949)
- Father Was a Fullback (1949)
- When Willies Comes Marching Home (1950)
- A Ticket to Tomahawk (1950)
- I'll Get By (1950)
- Half Angel (1951)
- Meet Me After the Show (1951)
- Let's Make It Legal (1951)
- Let's Do It Again (1953)
- Woman's World (1954)
- Fire Over Africa (1954)
- Suddenly (1954)
- Seven Waves Away (1957) (US title: Abandon Ship)
- Gentlemen Marry Brunettes (1955)
- Over-Exposed! (1956)
- Torpedo Run (1958)
- The White Buffalo (1977)
- Assassination (1987)

== As director ==
- Spoilers of the North (1947)
- Campus Honeymoon (1948)
- A Ticket to Tomahawk (1950)
- I'll Get By (1950)
- Half Angel (1951)
- Meet Me After the Show (1951)
- Let's Make It Legal (1951)
- My Wife's Best Friend (1952)
- The Girl Next Door (1953)
- Malaga (1954)
- Gentlemen Marry Brunettes (1955)
- Seven Waves Away (1957) (US title: Abandon Ship)

Some of these additional movies were found in the Los Angeles Times.
