= Cari Beauchamp =

American journalist (1949–2023)

- Beauchamp in 2015
- Born: Carol Ann Beauchamp; September 12, 1949; Berkeley, California, U.S.
- Died: December 14, 2023 (aged 74); Los Angeles, California, U.S.
- Education: San Jose State University (BA)
- Occupations: Author; historian; journalist; filmmaker
- Children: 2
- Writing career
- Subject: Hollywood history
- Notable works: Without Lying Down; The Day My God Died
- Website: www.caribeauchamp.com

Carol Ann "Cari" Beauchamp (/biːʃæm/; September 12, 1949 – December 14, 2023) was an American author, historian, journalist, and documentary filmmaker. She authored the biography Without Lying Down: Frances Marion and the Power of Women in Hollywood, which was subsequently made into a documentary film. She was the resident scholar of the Mary Pickford Foundation.

== Background ==
Carol Ann Beauchamp was born on September 12, 1949, in Berkeley, California, and grew up in Stockton, California. After graduating with a BA in political science and American history from San Jose State University in 1972, she intended to go to law school, but instead spent the next 6 years as a private investigator for defense attorneys, including Barney Drefus and Charles Garry, and the Legal Aid Society of Santa Clara County, serving as lead investigator on several major class action suits.

Simultaneously, she became involved in the Women's Rights Movement and was elected the first President of National Women's Political Caucus of California in 1973. She also managed a variety of election campaigns throughout the 1970s including for Janet Gray Hayes, who was elected mayor of San Jose in 1976, the first woman in the country to be mayor of a city of over 500,000. Beauchamp also spent several years working in Washington DC with Gloria Steinem, Bella Abzug and many others on behalf of the Equal Rights Amendment before returning to California in 1979 to serve as press secretary to Governor Jerry Brown.

== Career ==
=== Author ===
After a year of working in Europe and several years in New York, she took time off to give birth to two sons. While pregnant with her second son, she signed her first book contract, which resulted in Hollywood on the Riviera: The Inside Story of the Cannes Film Festival with Henri Behar, published by William Morrow & Co.

In 1998, she wrote Without Lying Down: Frances Marion and The Powerful Women of Early Hollywood, published by Scribner and the University of California Press. The book examines the lives of Frances Marion (Oscar-winning screenwriter of The Big House and The Champ) and many of her female colleagues who shaped filmmaking from the 1920s through the 1940s. Without Lying Down was named one of the 100 Most Notable Books of the Year by both The New York Times and the Los Angeles Times and was awarded Book of the Year by the National Theater Arts Association.

In 2003 came Anita Loos Rediscovered, which was edited and annotated by Beauchamp and Mary Anita Loos (Anita Loos' niece). Published by University of California Press, the book compiles samples of Loos's previously unpublished work as well as the personal life and work of novelist, screenwriter, and playwright, author of Gentlemen Prefer Blondes, as well as several other books and dozens of plays and screenplays. In 2006, University of California Press released Adventures of a Hollywood Secretary: Her Private Letters from Inside the Studios of the 1920s by Valeria Belletti, edited and annotated by Beauchamp, with a foreword by Samuel Goldwyn Jr., chronicling an insider's view of the film studios of the 1920s from a secretary's perspective. In 2009, Beauchamp wrote Joseph P. Kennedy Presents: His Hollywood Years published by Knopf and Vintage Books. The book examines Joseph P. Kennedy's reign in Hollywood, where he held sway over the industry from 1926 to 1930 as the only person to head three studios simultaneously.

=== Documentary ===
Beauchamp wrote and co-produced the documentary film Without Lying Down: Frances Marion and The Powerful Women of Early Hollywood, which premiered in 2000 on Turner Classic Movies, and for which she was nominated for a Writers' Guild Award. She also wrote the documentary film The Day My God Died about young girls of Nepal sold into sexual slavery which played on PBS and was nominated for an Emmy in 2003. She also appeared as an expert on film history in a half dozen other documentaries including Mark Cousins' production of The Story of Film: An Odyssey.

=== Journalist and film historian ===
Beauchamp wrote for various magazines and newspapers, including Vanity Fair, Variety, The Hollywood Reporter, The New York Times, and the Los Angeles Times.

Beauchamp was a frequent featured speaker on the subject of Women and Hollywood History, appearing throughout the United States and Europe, including the Academy of Motion Picture Arts and Sciences, the British Film Institute, the Museum of Modern Art, the Edinburgh Film Festival, the Cannes Film Festival, The Los Angeles Times Festival of Books, The Women's Museum of Art in Washington D.C. and the Los Angeles County Museum of Art.

Beauchamp was named the Academy of Motion Picture Arts and Sciences Film Scholar twice and was a resident scholar of the Mary Pickford Foundation.

== Personal life and death ==
Beauchamp was married twice, and had two sons. She died at Cedars-Sinai Medical Center in Los Angeles on December 14, 2023, at the age of 74.

== Works ==
- Anita Loos Rediscovered: Film Treatments and Fiction by Anita Loos, Creator of Gentlemen Prefer Blondes

Author: Anita Loos
Editors: Cari Beauchamp, Mary Loos
Publisher : University of California Press, 2003
ISBN 9780520228948

- Mary Pickford, Queen of the Silent Film Era: A Life in Stills

Author: George A. Walker
Foreword: Cari Beauchamp
Publisher : The Porcupine's Quill, 2020
ISBN 9780889844346
