= Woman's World (1954 film) =

1954 film by Jean Negulesco

- Theatrical release poster
- Directed by: Jean Negulesco
- Screenplay by: Claude Binyon; Russel Crouse; Howard Lindsay; Mary Loos; Richard Sale
- Based on: "May the Best Wife Win"; 1950 McCall's magazine story by Mona Williams
- Produced by: Charles Brackett
- Starring: Clifton Webb; June Allyson; Van Heflin; Lauren Bacall; Fred MacMurray; Arlene Dahl; Cornel Wilde
- Cinematography: Joseph MacDonald
- Edited by: Louis R. Loeffler
- Music by: Cyril J. Mockridge
- Production company: 20th Century Fox
- Distributed by: 20th Century Fox
- Release date: September 30, 1954
- Running time: 94 minutes
- Country: United States
- Language: English
- Budget: $2,010,000
- Box office: $3 million (US rentals)

Woman's World (also known as A Woman's World) is a 1954 American CinemaScope and print by Technicolor drama film about corporate America directed by Jean Negulesco and starring Clifton Webb, June Allyson, Van Heflin, Lauren Bacall, Fred MacMurray, Arlene Dahl and Cornel Wilde. The screenplay concerns three men who compete for the top job at a large company.

== Plot ==
When the general manager of Gifford Motors dies, company owner Ernest Gifford (Clifton Webb) invites the three candidates for the position to New York City so he can personally evaluate them and their wives. Bill and Katie Baxter (Cornel Wilde and June Allyson) are a loving couple from Kansas City. Elizabeth Burns (Lauren Bacall) is becoming estranged from her driven husband Sidney (Fred MacMurray) because his work is consuming him and undermining his health; she fears a promotion would eventually kill him. Jerry Talbot (Van Heflin), who has a sexy, ambitious wife, Carol (Arlene Dahl), rounds out the trio.

As time goes by, Katie is shown to be a bit of a klutz, both physically and socially. On the other hand, Elizabeth is both poised and gracious. Despite their differences, she and Katie get along well. When the couples are unexpectedly invited to spend the weekend at the estate of Gifford's sister Evelyn Andrews, (Margalo Gillmore), Elizabeth generously helps Katie buy appropriate clothing on a limited budget.

Meanwhile, Carol does her best to "help" her husband by playing up to a seemingly appreciative Gifford at every opportunity, despite Jerry's demands that she stop interfering. It becomes clear to Gifford that the best candidate and the most suitable wife are unfortunately not married to each other. He announces that he will reveal his decision after dinner. Carol makes one last brazen attempt to influence his choice and is surprised to learn that, while Jerry is Gifford's favorite, he will not get the job because of a fatal handicap. When she informs her husband and also how she helped him in the past, Jerry proves that he got at least one big promotion on his own merits, not because of her charms. He then says to her that they are through and tells her to pack and leave. When Gifford finds out, he is pleased. He had hoped that Jerry would see his wife for what she was. Gifford congratulates his new general manager for passing the test. The other two couples are relieved.

== Cast ==
- Clifton Webb as Ernest Gifford
- June Allyson as Katie Baxter
- Van Heflin as Jerry Talbot
- Lauren Bacall as Elizabeth Burns
- Fred MacMurray as Sidney Burns
- Arlene Dahl as Carol Talbot
- Cornel Wilde as Bill Baxter
- Elliott Reid as Tony Andrews, Gifford's nephew
- Margalo Gillmore as Evelyn Andrews, Gifford's sister

== Production ==
The film was based on Mona Williams' short story "May the Best Wife Win", originally published in McCall's magazine in 1950. 20th Century Fox bought the film rights, intending to make a movie along the lines of A Letter to Three Wives and All About Eve.

In January 1952 Julian Blaustein was to produce and the film was going to star Jeanne Crain, Corinne Calvet, Marilyn Monroe and Joanne Dru. In April 1953 Claude Binyon was going to direct and Raymond Klune produce with Jeanne Crain and possibly Gloria Grahame to star. Other castings mentioned included Susan Hayward and Michael Rennie. By December 1953 Binyon had finished the script.

In January 1954 producer Charles Brackett announced the team of Lindsay and Crouse would write the script. Brackett wanted to cast six stars and aimed to start filming in April.

Location filming started in New York in February while the script was being written. By this stage the director was Jean Negulesco and the stars were intended to be Clifton Webb, June Allyson, Eleanor Parker, Glenn Ford, Lauren Bacall and Charlton Heston. There was also a car, the "Ford of Tomorrow", built by Ford at a cost of $180,000. There were three weeks location filming, then some location work at a Detroit auto plant, before filming was to start at a studio later.

By April the stars signed were Clifton Webb, Jean Peters, Gloria Grahame, June Allyson and Cornel Wilde. Wilde did the film as the last movie under an old commitment with Fox. Eventually Van Heflin and Fred MacMurray joined the cast, and Lauren Bacall replaced Grahame and Arlene Dahl replaced Peters. Filming started 3 May.

== See also ==
- Executive Suite, a similar film released the same year, with June Allyson again playing a reluctant, but loyal, wife.
