= Gil Orlovitz =

American poet

Gil Orlovitz (1918–1973) was an American poet, novelist, short story writer, playwright and screenwriter.

== Biography ==
Orlovitz was born in Philadelphia, PA. He worked as a staff writer for Columbia Pictures, co-writing the screenplay for Over-Exposed and writing episodes of The Adventures of Jim Bowie and The Life and Legend of Wyatt Earp. He published several books of poetry during the 1950s and 1960s and his poetry, plays and short stories appeared in several anthologies and journals. He published two novels, Milkbottle H and Ice Never F, the first two parts of a planned trilogy, in 1967 and 1970 respectively. He died in 1973 at the age of 55.

== Selected bibliography ==
=== Poetry collections ===
- Concerning Man. New York: The Banyan Press, 1947.
- Keep to Your Belly, drawings by Paul Lett. New York: Louis Brigante, 1952.
- The Diary of Dr. Eric Zeno. San Francisco: Inferno Press, 1953.
- The Diary of Alexander Patience. San Francisco: Inferno Press, 1958.
- The Papers of Professor Bold. Eureka, CA: The Hearse Press, 1959.
- Selected Poems. San Francisco: Inferno Press, 1960.
- Art of the Sonnet. Nashville: Hillsboro Publications, 1961.
- Couldn't Say, Might Be Love. London: Barrie and Rockliff, 1969.
- More Poems. Fredericton, New Brunswick: Fiddlehead Poetry Books, 1972.

=== Novels ===
- Milkbottle H. London: Calder and Boyers, 1967; New York: Dell Publishing Co., 1968.
- Ice Never F. London: Calder and Boyers, 1970.

=== Short stories ===
- "What Are They All Waiting For?", included in Discovery #2, ed. Vance Bourjaily. New York: Pocket Books, 1953.
- "Lila Bohmer", included in Strange Desires, ed. Vernon Shea. New York: Lion Books, 1954.
- "I'm Just in Sparta on a Visit", included in The Award Avant-Garde Reader (also ed.). New York: Award Books, 1965.

=== Screenplays ===
- Over-Exposed, co-written with James Gunn, from a story by Richard Sale and Mary Loos. Columbia Pictures, 1956.

=== Anthology ===
- What Are They All Waiting For? Stories, Poems & Essays: 1944-1962. Arlington, MA: Tough Poets Press, 2018.

== Sources ==
- Stern, Gerald. "Miss Pink at Last: An Appreciation of Gil Orlovitz". Philadelphia: The American Poetry Review, Vol. 7, No. 6 (November/December 1978), pp. 27–31.
- Chatfield, Hale. "Literary Exile in Residence". Gambier, OH: The Kenyon Review, Vol. 31, No. 4 (1969), pp. 545–553.
- Daniels, Guy. "Notes Toward a Bibliography of Gil Orlovitz". Philadelphia: The American Poetry Review, Vol. 7, No. 6 (Nov/Dec 1978), pp. 31–32.
- Fagan, Edward R. "Disjointed Time and the Contemporary Novel". University Park, PA: The Journal of General Education, Vol. 23, No. 2 (Jul 1971), pp. 151–160.
