= The Dude Goes West =

1948 film by Kurt Neumann

- Directed by: Kurt Neumann
- Written by: Mary Loos; Richard Sale
- Produced by: Frank King; Maurice King
- Starring: Eddie Albert; Gale Storm; James Gleason
- Cinematography: Karl Struss
- Edited by: Richard V. Heermance
- Music by: Dimitri Tiomkin
- Production company: King Brothers Productions
- Distributed by: Allied Artists Pictures
- Release date: May 30, 1948
- Running time: 87 minutes
- Country: United States
- Language: English

The Dude Goes West is a 1948 American comedy Western film starring Eddie Albert and Gale Storm. It was directed by Kurt Neumann and released by Monogram Pictures. The film was originally known as Tombstone.

== Plot ==
Gunsmith and marksman Daniel Bone closes his Brooklyn, New York business and travels west, where he feels that he belongs. On a train, he encounters passenger Liza Crockett. After witnessing the theft of her purse, Dan confronts the thief, disarms him and throws him off the train. The thief is a notorious outlaw called the Pecos Kid who vows revenge against "the dude" who interfered with his holdup. Liza mistakenly believes that it was Dan who had tried to steal her bag.

They part ways, but later encounter one another in the desert, as Liza makes her way to Arsenic City, Nevada, where a map to her father's gold mine might make Liza a wealthy woman. On their way, riding in her buckboard, Indians capture them. Dan's knowledge of their language and some minor "magic" impresses the tribe's chief and he treats them as his guests.

After arriving in Arsenic City, the two encounter another outlaw, Texas Jack Barton, and a corrupt saloonkeeper, Kiki Kelly, who are both interested in the mine. Dan finds the map, memorizes it and burns it. He falls in love with Liza and leads her to the gold. When the outlaws ambush them, their new Indian friends ride to their rescue.

== Cast ==
- Eddie Albert as Dan Bone
- Gale Storm as Liza Crockett
- Gilbert Roland as the Pecos Kid
- James Gleason as Sam Briggs
- Barton MacLane as Texas Jack
- Binnie Barnes as Kiki Kelly
- Sarah Padden as Mrs. Hulskamp
