= The French Line =

1954 film by Lloyd Bacon

- Theatrical release poster
- Directed by: Lloyd Bacon
- Written by: Matty Kemp; Isabel Dawn; Mary Loos; Richard Sale
- Produced by: Edmund Grainger
- Starring: Jane Russell; Gilbert Roland; Arthur Hunnicutt; Mary McCarty
- Cinematography: Harry J. Wild
- Edited by: Robert Ford
- Music by: Walter Scharf (uncredited)
- Production company: RKO Pictures
- Distributed by: RKO Pictures
- Release dates: December 29, 1953 (St. Louis); February 8, 1954
- Running time: 102 minutes
- Country: United States
- Language: English
- Box office: $2.9 million (US)

The French Line is a 1953 American RKO Pictures musical film starring Jane Russell, directed by Lloyd Bacon and produced by Edmund Grainger, with Howard Hughes as executive producer. The screenplay was written by Mary Loos and Richard Sale based on a story by Matty Kemp and Isabel Dawn. The French Line was filmed in three-strip Technicolor and dual-strip polarized 3D.

== Plot ==
Millionairess Mame Carson's oil empire causes trouble for her lovelife, as men either desire her fortune or fear it. Her money-shy fiancé Phil Barton has recently dumped her. Disappointed, Mame sails for Paris on the French Line's Liberté with friend and fashion designer Annie Farrell. She swaps identities with Myrtle Brown, one of Annie's models, hoping to find true love incognito.

Aboard ship, Mame falls in love with French playboy Pierre DuQuesne, who has been hired by her zealous guardian Waco Mosby to repel the fortune hunters without her knowledge. Pierre professes his love for Mame, but she is unsure whether he is sincere or staging a ploy to gain access to her fortune.

== Cast ==
- Jane Russell as Mary "Mame" Carson
- Gilbert Roland as Pierre DuQuesne
- Arthur Hunnicutt as Waco Mosby
- Mary McCarty as Annie Farrell
- Joyce MacKenzie as Myrtle Brown
- Paula Corday as Celeste
- Scott Elliott as Bill Harris
- Craig Stevens as Phil Barton
- Laura Elliot as Kate Hodges
- Steven Geray as François
- John Wengraf as Commodore Renard
- Michael St. Angel as George Hodges
- Barbara Darrow as Donna Adams
- Barbara Dobbins as Kitty Lee

Kim Novak has a small role, her first in a feature film.

== Production ==
RKO Pictures owner Howard Hughes, who had found controversy with Jane Russell's costumes in The Outlaw years earlier, faced similar issues with The French Line. The Motion Picture Association of America (MPAA) refused to grant the film a Production Code seal of approval, branding it "offensive" because of "indecent exposure" during Russell's signature "Lookin' for Trouble" dance number. Hughes defiantly arranged for the film to premiere at the Fox Theatre in St. Louis on December 29, 1953 without the seal. Russell refused to attend the premiere or embark on a publicity tour for the film, telling the press that "I certainly don't want to be associated with any picture that's denied the seal." RKO was fined $25,000 for advertising and exhibiting the film without the seal or the approval of the film industry's Advertising Advisory Council, and the St. Louis archbishop Joseph Ritter forbade Catholics "under penalty of mortal sin" from seeing the film. Nevertheless, the film sold more than 60,000 tickets in the first five days of its St. Louis engagement.

On January 9, 1954, RKO announced that it would withdraw the film in nine days and submit a new cut to the MPAA to attain certification. When the MPAA continued to refuse to approve the film, Hughes kept it running in theaters, and the Catholic National Legion of Decency graded the film Class C or "Condemned" as a consequence. The film was banned in Chicago and Boston, and was released in New York, Pennsylvania, Maryland, Kansas and Detroit only after part of the offending dance number was excised.

== Reception ==
In a contemporary review for The New York Times, critic Bosley Crowther called the film "a fable that looks a faint stencil of 'Gentlemen Prefer Blondes,' touched up with smoking-room humor" and wrote: "There's no use pretending about this picture. It's a cheap, exhibitionistic thing In which even the elaboration of the feminine figure eventually becomes grotesque. It looks as though someone had the notion that a very low and rather tight bodice, continued through numerous costume changes, is worth more than anybody's script—which may be, indeed ... To say any more about the cheapness and obviousness of this R. K. O. film would be but to give it more attention. And that it most certainly does not deserve."

Variety called the film "a rather mild, gabby fashion parade in 3-D" with "little of the imaginative" in the direction or screenplay. Richard L. Coe of The Washington Post wrote that "the essential sin of this half-baked dish is its dull, boring insistence. Since I am trying to forget the details as rapidly as possible, you will forgive me for not going into them specifically." The Los Angeles Times wrote, "As a romantic comedy with music, the film may be described as uninventively reminiscent of such predecessors as 'Gentlemen Prefer Blondes' and 'Roberta.' Even with an intermission it runs uncomfortably long." Harrison's Reports praised the "gorgeous" Technicolor but called the story "very weak, with the first three-fourths slow and uninspiring. It becomes lively in the model scenes in the last one-fourth, where flesh is displayed prominently, and in the dance sequences, where Miss Russell is tantalizing as she prances about in as scanty a costume as it is possible for a girl to wear." John McCarten of The New Yorker reported that he watched the film's 3D effects "with interest, if very little pleasure", and lamented that Mary McCarty was "grievously wasted on such trash." The Monthly Film Bulletin was somewhat kinder, writing that the script, "though low on comic situations, provides the star with some effective wisecracks and at least one number ('What is this I feel?') in which her comedy talent reveals itself as of a high order."

== Legacy ==
The only known surviving 3D print of The French Line was screened at the World 3-D Expo 2006 on September 15, 2006 at Grauman's Egyptian Theatre in Hollywood. The print included the rare uncensored version of the "Lookin' for Trouble" number.

Turner Home Entertainment released The French Line on VHS in 1989, although in its censored form. Turner Classic Movies and Australia's ABC Television occasionally air the censored version.
