= I'll Get By (film) =

1950 film by Richard Sale

- Directed by: Richard Sale
- Screenplay by: Mary Loos; Richard Sale
- Story by: Robert Ellis; Pamela Harris; Helen Logan
- Produced by: William Perlberg
- Starring: June Haver; William Lundigan; Gloria DeHaven; Dennis Day
- Cinematography: Charles G. Clarke
- Edited by: J. Watson Webb Jr.
- Music by: Lionel Newman
- Color process: Technicolor
- Production company: 20th Century Fox
- Distributed by: 20th Century Fox
- Release dates: October 2, 1950; October 20, 1950 (Los Angeles); November 1, 1950 (New York)
- Running time: 83 minutes
- Country: United States
- Language: English
- Box office: $2,450,000 (US rentals)

I'll Get By is a 1950 American comedy musical film directed by Richard Sale and starring June Haver, Gloria DeHaven and William Lundigan. The story follows themes explored in Tin Pan Alley (1940) with updated characters and music. The plot involves songwriters and their struggles in the music industry.

== Plot ==
Song plugger Bill Spencer is fired and starts his own music-publishing business. He hires secretary Miss Murphy and gains a partner in Freddy Lee, a young man from Texas, with whom he peddles a song that piano player Chester Dooley has written. When they hear that singer Terry Martin is performing with trumpeter Harry James at a club, they visit the club to pitch the song to her. Bill had met Terry's sister Liza, who is also in the act. in an earlier awkward encounter.

Freddy annoys Terry but the girls like the song "I'll Get By" and agree to record it, making them huge successes. Before a benefit in Hollywood, when the actress Jeanne Crain asks to perform the song, Bill refuses because he had promised it to Liza. Without Bill's knowledge, Freddy allows Crain to sing it. Liza is furious and leaves Bill, refusing to listen to his attempts to explain.

The boys enlist into the Marines, and when they report to Marine Corps Recruit Depot San Diego. They encounter Miss Murphy, who is now stationed there as an officer. After the boys leave on duty, Miss Murphy explains to Liza and Terry what had happened with the song. The girls embark on a USO show tour to the South Pacific where the guys have been sent, and they all are reunited.

== Cast ==
- June Haver as Liza Martin
- William Lundigan as William Spencer
- Gloria DeHaven as Terry Martin
- Dennis Day as Freddy Lee
- Thelma Ritter as Miss Murphy
- Harry James as Himself
- Jeanne Crain as Herself
- Steve Allen as Peter Pepper
- Harry Antrim as Mr. Olinville
- Danny Davenport as Chester Dooley
- Dan Dailey as Himself

== Production ==
Production was halted in May 1950 after star June Haver collapsed on the set during a strenuous dance scene. She was brought home in an ambulance and was later rushed to the hospital in critical condition with a painful abscess in her side that required surgery. Haver's return was repeatedly delayed by her doctors. With no timetable for Haver's return and at least one more dancing scene to be filmed, the studio elected to shoot additional scenes. The two-month postponement cost the studio as much as $200,000.

== Reception ==
In a contemporary review for The New York Times, critic Thomas M. Pryor wrote: "There is so much vocalizing and instrumental activity on the sound track that the story doesn't stand a chance. Just as well, perhaps, because the romantic drama is nothing to write home about. The screen play serves merely as a prop to keep the music going round ... The most incredible thing about the picture is that no less than five people are listed in the credits as having contributed to the screen play. One is prompted to ask, 'How come so much labor and so little results?'"

Critic John L. Scott of the Los Angeles Times called I'll Get By "an engaging film with engaging people" and wrote that a "slight story framework holds together long enough to get its performers to the last sequence".

== Awards ==
Lionel Newman received a nomination for the 1951 Academy Award in the category of Best Music, Scoring for this film.
