= Over-Exposed =

1956 film by Lewis Seiler

- Theatrical release poster
- Directed by: Lewis Seiler
- Screenplay by: James Gunn; Gil Orlovitz
- Story by: Richard Sale; Mary Loos
- Produced by: Lewis J. Rachmil
- Starring: Cleo Moore; Richard Crenna; Raymond Greenleaf
- Cinematography: Henry Freulich
- Edited by: Edwin H. Bryant
- Production company: Columbia Pictures
- Distributed by: Columbia Pictures
- Release date: March 5, 1956
- Running time: 80 minutes
- Country: United States
- Language: English

Over-Exposed is a 1956 American film noir crime film directed by Lewis Seiler and starring Cleo Moore, Richard Crenna and Raymond Greenleaf. It was produced and distributed by Columbia Pictures.

This film was released on DVD by Sony Pictures in 2010 as part of the Bad Girls of Film Noir Volume II collection along with Night Editor, Women's Prison and One Girl's Confession.

== Plot ==
Ambitious and vivacious Lily Krenshka is new in town and is arrested for working at a clip joint. She is told by the police to take the next bus out of town. Krenshka asks photographer Max West to not print her arrest photo. He offers to pay her for swimsuit poses and, never one to overlook an opportunity, she learns the art of photography from him. After a while, she sets out for New York to start a new career, changing her name to Lila Crane at West's suggestion.

A chance meeting with reporter Russ Bassett leads to an introduction to nightclub owner Les Bauer, who employs Lila as a 'flash girl' to take pictures at the club. A newspaper gossip-columnist, Roy Carver, surreptitiously offers to pay her $5 for candid shots of important guests. She negotiates to $10 and agrees.

After Crane gets a photo of Horace Sutherland, an attorney known for his gangster clientele, together with his mistress, Crane essentially extorts him for a job at Club Coco, a new fancy nightclub with 'more important' patrons.

After flattering high-society maven Mrs. Payton Grange, a former client of West, with a rare good photo, Crane's exclusive makes a name for her as a photographer. She quickly becomes well-known and well-paid, acquiring her own clients and contracts, and resisting Russ Bassett's offer to get her a steady, respectable job with his news-agency employer. She's so busy, she brings in West to be her assistant. She and Bassett develop a relationship, but he's not happy about her drive for fame and money, seemingly at all costs. Lila appears on an interview on KXIW-TV (an unlikely call sign for a New York City broadcaster, as all East Coast call signs begin with W) Channel 14.

Things shortly begin go downhill. Bassett plans to leave for Europe after she rejects his proposal of marriage. One evening, Grange dies on the dance floor at Club Coco. A picture Crane managed to take of her collapsing is stolen by Carver and published, sullying Crane with her club boss who fires her, and most of her other clients follow suit.

Crane, desperate, then shows Sutherland an incriminating photo she had accidentally taken at the club, of his boss "Backlin" and a rival crime boss who had been murdered later that night. She offers to sell it to Sutherland for $25,000. Her attempt at blackmail gets her kidnapped by Backlin's henchmen. Bassett realizes Crane is in trouble and rushes to her apartment where he disarms one of the kidnappers and forces him to reveal where she's being held. There he overpowers all three men and rescues Crane. She reveals Backlin to the police despite the fact she could be jailed for withholding evidence.

As they leave the police station, Crane renounces her career in order to marry Bassett.

== Cast ==
- Cleo Moore as Lily Krenshka / Lila Crane
- Raymond Greenleaf as Max West
- Richard Crenna as Russ Bassett
- Jack Albertson as Les Bauer
- Isobel Elsom as Mrs. Grange
- Dayton Lummis as Horace Sutherland
- James O'Rear as Roy Carver
