= Cyril J. Mockridge =

English film and television composer

Cyril John Mockridge
- Born: August 6, 1896; London, England
- Died: January 18, 1979 (aged 82) Honolulu, Hawaii, U.S.
- Occupation: Film composer
- Years active: 1933–1967

Cyril John Mockridge (August 6, 1896 – January 18, 1979) was an English film and television composer. He received professional training at the Royal Academy of Music in London. In the early 1930s, Mockridge went to Hollywood where he scored and arranged the music for more than a hundred films including Cheaper by the Dozen, River of No Return and The Man Who Shot Liberty Valance.

== Career ==
He was nominated for an Academy Award for the 1955 film Guys and Dolls with Jay Blackton.

Mockridge spent years as a staff composer for Twentieth Century-Fox, frequently working with Alfred Newman and Alfred's brother Lionel. He retired to Hawaii, where he died in 1979 and is buried at Forest Lawn Memorial Park in Hollywood Hills, Los Angeles.

== Filmography ==
- The World Moves On (1934)
- Judge Priest (1934)
- The Farmer Takes a Wife (1935)
- Way Down East (1935)
- The Little Colonel (1935)
- The Littlest Rebel (1935)
- Lloyd's of London (1936)
- Captain January (1936)
- Under Two Flags (1936)
- Dimples (1936)
- Poor Little Rich Girl (1936)
- Seventh Heaven (1937)
- You Can't Have Everything (1937)
- In Old Chicago (1938)
- Suez (1938)
- The Little Princess (1939)
- The Hound of the Baskervilles (1939)
- Second Fiddle (1939)
- The Adventures of Sherlock Holmes (1939)
- Hollywood Cavalcade (1939)
- Stanley and Livingstone (1939)
- Swanee River (1939)
- Johnny Apollo (1940)
- Lillian Russell (1940)
- Young People (1940)
- Brigham Young (1940)
- Down Argentine Way (1940)
- The Mark of Zorro (1940)
- Hudson's Bay (1941)
- Moon Over Miami (1941)
- Charley's Aunt (1941)
- Wild Geese Calling (1941)
- Belle Starr (1941)
- A Yank in the R.A.F. (1941)
- I Wake Up Screaming (1941)
- Roxie Hart (1942)
- Rings on Her Fingers (1942)
- Prelude to War (1942)
- My Gal Sal (1942)
- A-Haunting We Will Go (1942)
- The Loves of Edgar Allan Poe (1942)
- Time to Kill (1942)
- My Friend Flicka (1943)
- The Oxbow Incident (1943)
- Heaven Can Wait (1943)
- Holy Matrimony (1943)
- Happy Land (1943)
- The Lodger (1944)
- The Fighting Sullivans (1944)
- Pin Up Girl (1944)
- The Big Noise (1944)
- Thunderhead - Son of Flicka (1945)
- Where Do We Go from Here? (1945)
- State Fair (1945)
- The Dark Corner (1946)
- Cluny Brown (1946)
- My Darling Clementine (1946)
- Miracle on 34th Street (1947)
- Nightmare Alley (1947)
- The Walls of Jericho (1948)
- That Lady in Ermine (1948)
- The Luck of the Irish (1948)
- Road House (1948)
- The Beautiful Blonde from Bashful Bend (1949)
- I Was a Male War Bride (1949)
- Cheaper by the Dozen (1950)
- A Ticket to Tomahawk (1950)
- Where the Sidewalk Ends (1950)
- American Guerrilla in the Philippines (1950)
- Father Was a Fullback (1950)
- On the Riviera (1951)
- The Frogmen (1951)
- Let's Make It Legal (1951)
- Deadline—U.S.A. (1952)
- Mister Scoutmaster (1953)
- How to Marry a Millionaire (1953)
- River of No Return (1954)
- Woman's World (1954)
- Guys and Dolls (1955; co-nominated with Jay Blackton)
- The Lieutenant Wore Skirts (1956)
- The Solid Gold Cadillac (1956)
- Desk Set (1957)
- Will Success Spoil Rock Hunter? (1957)
- Rally 'Round the Flag, Boys! (1958)
- Thunder in the Sun (1959)
- Hound-Dog Man (1959)
- Tall Story (1960)
- Wake Me When It's Over (1960)
- Flaming Star (1960)
- All Hands on Deck (1961)
- The Man Who Shot Liberty Valance (1962)
- Donovan's Reef (1963)
