= Father Was a Fullback =

1949 film by John M. Stahl

- 1950 Theatrical Poster
- Directed by: John M. Stahl
- Screenplay by: Aleen Leslie; Casey Robinson; Mary Loos; Richard Sale
- Story by: Clifford Goldsmith
- Produced by: Fred Kohlmar
- Starring: Fred MacMurray; Maureen O'Hara; Betty Lynn; Rudy Vallee; Thelma Ritter; Natalie Wood; James G. Backus
- Cinematography: Lloyd Ahern
- Edited by: J. Watson Webb Jr.
- Music by: Cyril J. Mockridge
- Distributed by: Twentieth Century Fox
- Release date: September 30, 1949
- Running time: 84 minutes
- Country: United States
- Language: English
- Box office: $1.8 million

Father Was a Fullback is a 1949 black-and-white film from 20th Century Fox based on a comedy by Clifford Goldsmith. The film is about a college American football coach and his woes. The film stars Fred MacMurray, Maureen O'Hara, Natalie Wood, and Betty Lynn.

== Plot ==
Additional information needed A college football coach struggles with his team's losing streak and family troubles.

== Cast ==
=== Principals ===
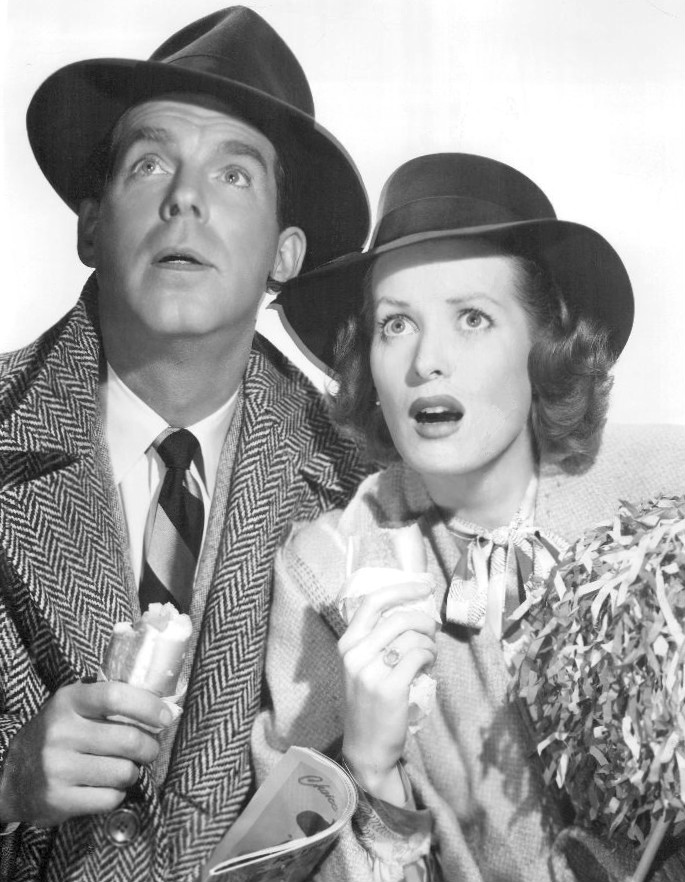
Fred MacMurray and Maureen O'Hara in a scene from the film

- Fred MacMurray as George "Coop" Cooper, A College Football Coach
- Maureen O'Hara as Elizabeth Cooper, His Wife
- Betty Lynn as Constance "Connie" Cooper, His Oldest Daughter
- Natalie Wood as Ellen Cooper, His Youngest Daughter
- Thelma Ritter as Geraldine, His Housekeeper
- Jim Backus as Professor "Sully" Sullivan, His Neighbor (billed as James G. Backus)
- Rudy Vallee as Mr. Roger "Jess" Jessup, A Football Supporter

=== Supporting players ===
- Robert Adler as Grandstand Bit Part (uncredited)
- Don Barclay as Grandstand "Coach" (uncredited)
- Gilbert Barnett as Stinky Parker (uncredited)
- Rodney Bell as Grandstand "Coach" (uncredited)
- Tom Bernard as Delivery Boy (uncredited)
- Harry Carter as Grandstand Bit Part (uncredited)
- Ruth Clifford as Neighbor (uncredited)
- Heinie Conklin as Ed (uncredited)
- Fred Dale as Cheerleader (uncredited)
- Gwenn Fields as Daphne Sullivan (uncredited)
- Bess Flowers as Football Fan (uncredited)
- Charles Flynn as Policeman (uncredited)
- Tom Hanlon as Radio Announcer (uncredited)
- Sam Harris as Alumnus at Dinner (uncredited)
- Joe Haworth as Skip, Reporter in Locker Room (uncredited)
- Don Hicks as Bill (uncredited)
- Pat Kane as Bellhop (uncredited)
- Kenner G. Kemp as Alumnus at Dinner (uncredited)
- Louise Lorimer as Mrs. Jones (uncredited)
- Lee MacGregor as Cheerleader (uncredited)
- Mike Mahoney as Pete, the Sailor (uncredited)
- Buddy Martin as Cheerleader (uncredited)
- Mickey McCardle as Jones (uncredited)
- John McKee as Cy (uncredited)
- Frank Mills as Assistant Football Coach (uncredited)
- Forbes Murray as Mr. Higgins, College President (uncredited)
- Robert Patten as Manager (uncredited)
- Bill Radovich as Football Player (uncredited)
- William Self as Willie Davis (uncredited)
- Richard Tyler as Hercules Smith a.k.a. Joe Birch (uncredited)
- Wilson Wood as Grandstand "Coach" (uncredited)

== See also ==
- List of American football films
