= Mother Is a Freshman =

1949 comedy motion picture directed by Lloyd Bacon

- Theatrical release poster
- Directed by: Lloyd Bacon
- Screenplay by: Mary Loos; Richard Sale
- Story by: Raphael Blau
- Produced by: Walter Morosco
- Starring: Loretta Young; Van Johnson; Rudy Vallée; Barbara Lawrence
- Cinematography: Arthur E. Arling
- Edited by: William H. Reynolds
- Music by: Alfred Newman
- Production company: 20th Century Fox
- Distributed by: 20th Century Fox
- Release date: March 12, 1949
- Running time: 81 minutes
- Country: United States
- Language: English
- Box office: $2,450,000

Mother Is a Freshman is a 1949 American technicolor comedy film directed by Lloyd Bacon and starring Loretta Young, Van Johnson and Rudy Vallée. It was produced and distributed by 20th Century Fox. The film was nominated for an Academy Award for Best Costume Design by Kay Nelson.

== Plot ==
Abby Abbott lives in New York City together with her teenage daughter Susan. They support themselves with money from a trust fund started by her late husband. An attorney by the name of John Heaslip handles the placement of the money, and he sees to it that payment is made every three years. He is also romantically interested in Abby, but she has consistently rejected his proposals to marry her. Since Abby has already spent all her money from the current lump sum, John informs her that she will have to wait "until February" for the next payment.

The largest cost is seventeen-year-old Susan's tuition for Pointer College. Desperate to get the money, Abby, whose maiden name was Abigail Fortitude just like her grandma, applies for a scholarship (specifically for women named "Abigail Fortitude") set up by the grandmother, amounting to $3,000 annually. To get the scholarship Abby has to enroll at the college. This way she can also keep an eye on her daughter, who has a crush on English professor Richard Michaels. The professor is writing light crime novels using a pseudonym.

Abby is determined to not disclose that she is Susan's mother, but the dean, Gillingham, discovers that she and Susan have the same home address. She begins her studies and enrolls in professor Michaels class. Richard is quite taken with the beautiful and mature woman, and asks her if he can see her in the evening for "tutoring" in private.

Abby agrees, but fears that the professor has an ulterior motive. It turns out that he has also invited the dean and his wife to dinner, and the evening is a success. During the course of the evening, the dean calls Abby "Mrs. Abbott" (much to Richard's surprise) and Abby loudly mentions that one of her classmates has bought an awful crime novel called "The Gravedigger and the Chambermaid." Richard takes Abby back to the dorm and kisses her goodnight. He also asks if she is married and she explains that she is Susan's mother and a widow. Now they are both falling in love with each other.

While Susan thinks Abby is checking up on her boyfriend-to-be, Richard invites Abby to a dance at the college. Susan tells Abby that she expects Richard to take her to the dance, and Abby is riddled with guilt. Still, she can't seem to get out of attending the dance and Susan has a young boy her age named Beaumont escort her. Unfortunately, since she doesn't know about her mother's date, she asks John to escort Abby.

Both John and Richard turn up at Abby's house to escort her on the evening of the dance. It turns out they are acquainted since they both went to Yale. John tells Abby that he has got her some extra money and that she doesn't have to continue college. Susan also finds out about her mother and Richard and is upset at first, but has a change of heart when Richard asks her to urge her mother to continue college. Susan begs her mother to stay at college and keep seeing Richard. The evening ends with Richard confessing he is the author of "The Gravedigger and the Chambermaid," and Abby confesses that she in fact has read it—twice!

== Cast ==
- Loretta Young as Mrs. Abby Abbott
- Van Johnson as Professor Michaels
- Rudy Vallée as John Heaslip
- Barbara Lawrence as Louise Sharpe
- Robert Arthur as Beaumont Jackson
- Betty Lynn as Susan Abbott
- Griff Barnett as Dean Gillingham
- Kathleen Hughes as Rhoda
