= M. J. Frankovich =

American film producer (1909–1992)

Mike Frankovich
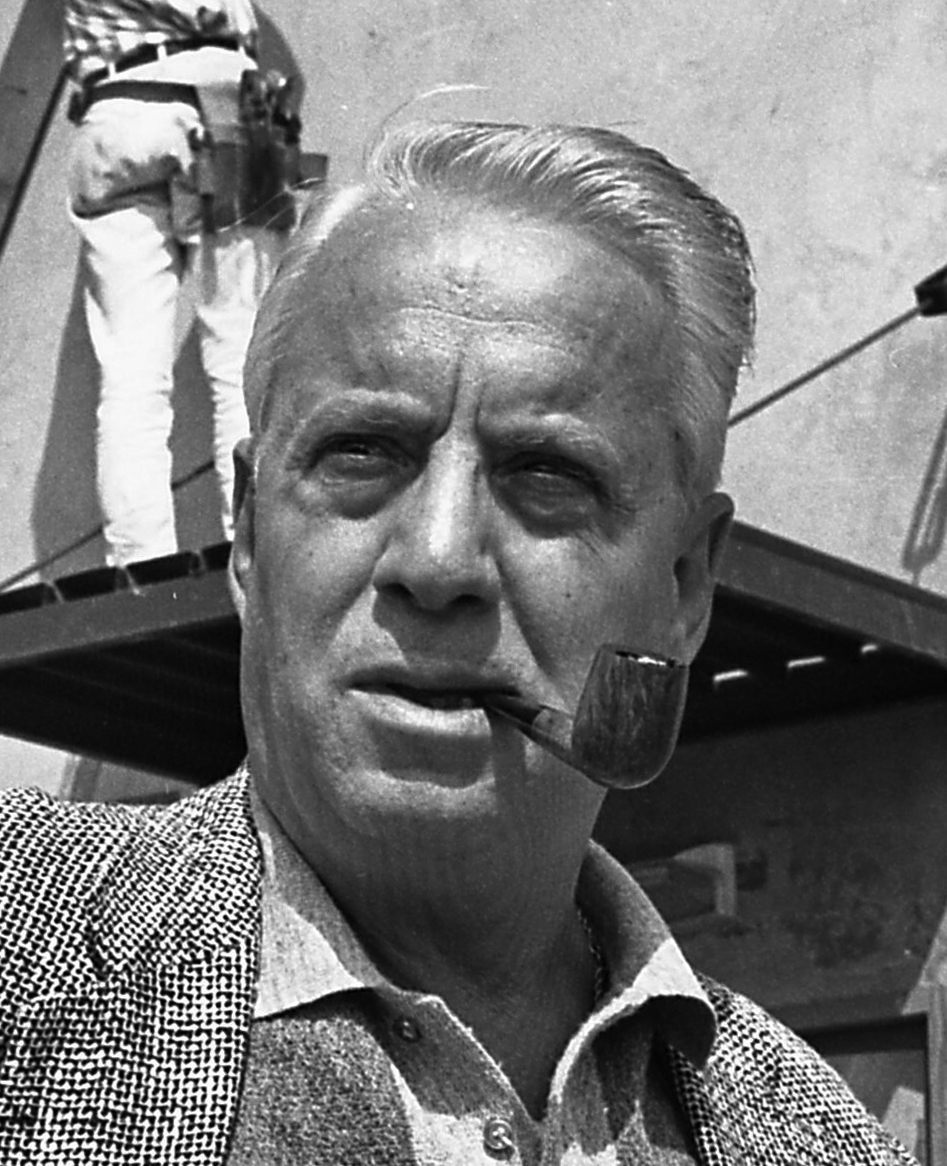
- Frankovich in 1965
- Born: Mitchell John Frankovich; September 29, 1909; Bisbee, Arizona, U.S.
- Died: January 1, 1992 (aged 82); Los Angeles, California, U.S.
- Resting place: Forest Lawn Memorial Park (Glendale)
- Other name: Mike Frankovich
- Education: UCLA
- Occupations: Actor, producer
- Spouse(s): Binnie Barnes (1940–1992; his death; 3 adopted children); Georgiana (or Georgianna) Feagans (1938–19??)

Mike Frankovich (born Mitchell John Frankovich, September 29, 1909 – January 1, 1992), also known professionally as M. J. Frankovich, was an American football player turned film actor and producer. For a number of years he was head of Columbia Pictures in London. His achievements included helping finance Bridge on the River Kwai and giving Goldie Hawn her first key film roles.

== Biography ==
Frankovich was the adopted son of actor Joe E. Brown and his wife, Kathryn. Frankovich attended Belmont High School in Downtown Los Angeles. He played football for UCLA and was inducted into UCLA Athletics Hall of Fame in 1986.

Frankovich began his motion picture career in 1935, as an actor. He usually played radio announcers or masters of ceremonies; today's audiences probably know him from Abbott and Costello's Buck Privates (1941), in which "Mike Frankovich" reports the army war games to the radio audience. He was working at Republic Pictures when his career was interrupted by service in the Army Air Corps during World War II. After the war, he returned to Republic and became a film producer. He supervised four adventure serials in 1947–48.

=== Columbia Pictures in London ===
He moved to Europe with his wife, British actress Binnie Barnes. He became managing director of Columbia Pictures in Britain in 1955.

Frankovich moved back to Los Angeles in 1963.

In 1968 he gave up his position as vice president and became an independent producer at Columbia.

In 1969 Frankovich put Goldie Hawn under a four-picture contract starting with Cactus Flower.

He served as president of the Los Angeles Memorial Coliseum Commission in the early 1980s, and helped to bring the Los Angeles Raiders football team and 1984 Summer Olympics to Los Angeles.

He received the Academy Awards' Jean Hersholt Humanitarian Award in 1983.

== Family ==
A devout Catholic, Frankovich married his first wife, Georgiana (or Georgianna) Feagans, on January 15, 1938. No details are available regarding that marriage or how or when it ended. Known descendants are his fourth cousins, Williamson Frankovich and Haley Frankovich.

He married actress Binnie Barnes in 1940. They remained married until his death. He produced some of her late movies, including her last movie in 1973, 40 Carats, in which she portrayed Liv Ullmann's mother.

== Death ==
He died of pneumonia on New Year's Day, 1992.

== Select filmography ==
- Buck Privates (1941) - actor
- Jesse James Rides Again (1947) (serial) - associate producer
- The Black Widow (1947) (serial) - associate producer
- G-Men Never Forget (1948) (serial) - associate producer
- Dangers of the Canadian Mounted (1948) (serial) - associate producer
- Fugitive Lady (1950) - producer
- Decameron Nights (1953) - producer
- Malaga (1954) - producer
- Footsteps in the Fog (1955) - producer
- Joe MacBeth (1955) - producer
- Spin a Dark Web (1956) aka Soho Incident - producer
- The War Lover (1962) - executive producer
- Bob & Carol & Ted & Alice (1969) - executive producer
- Marooned (1969) - producer
- Cactus Flower (1969) - producer
- The Looking Glass War (1970) - executive producer
- The 42nd Annual Academy Awards (1970) (TV special) - producer
- There's a Girl in My Soup (1970) - producer
- Doctors' Wives (1971) - producer
- The Love Machine (1971) - producer
- $ (1971) - producer
- Stand Up and Be Counted (1972) - producer
- Butterflies Are Free (1972) - producer
- 40 Carats (1973) - producer
- Bob & Carol & Ted & Alice (1973) (TV series) - executive producer
- Report to the Commissioner (1975) - producer
- From Noon Till Three (1976) - producer
- State Fair (1976) - executive producer
- The Shootist (1976) - producer
- Ziegfeld: The Man and His Women (1978) - executive producer
- All Star Party for Lucille Ball (1984)
- All-Star Party for Clint Eastwood (1986) (TV Special)

=== Films as head of Columbia Productions ===
- The Bridge on the River Kwai (1957)
- Lawrence of Arabia (1962)
- The Bedford Incident (1964)
- Lord Jim (1965)
- Major Dundee (1965)
- Mickey One (1965)
- Walk Don't Run (1966)
- To Sir with Love (1967)
- In Cold Blood (1967)
