= Robert Bassler =

American film producer

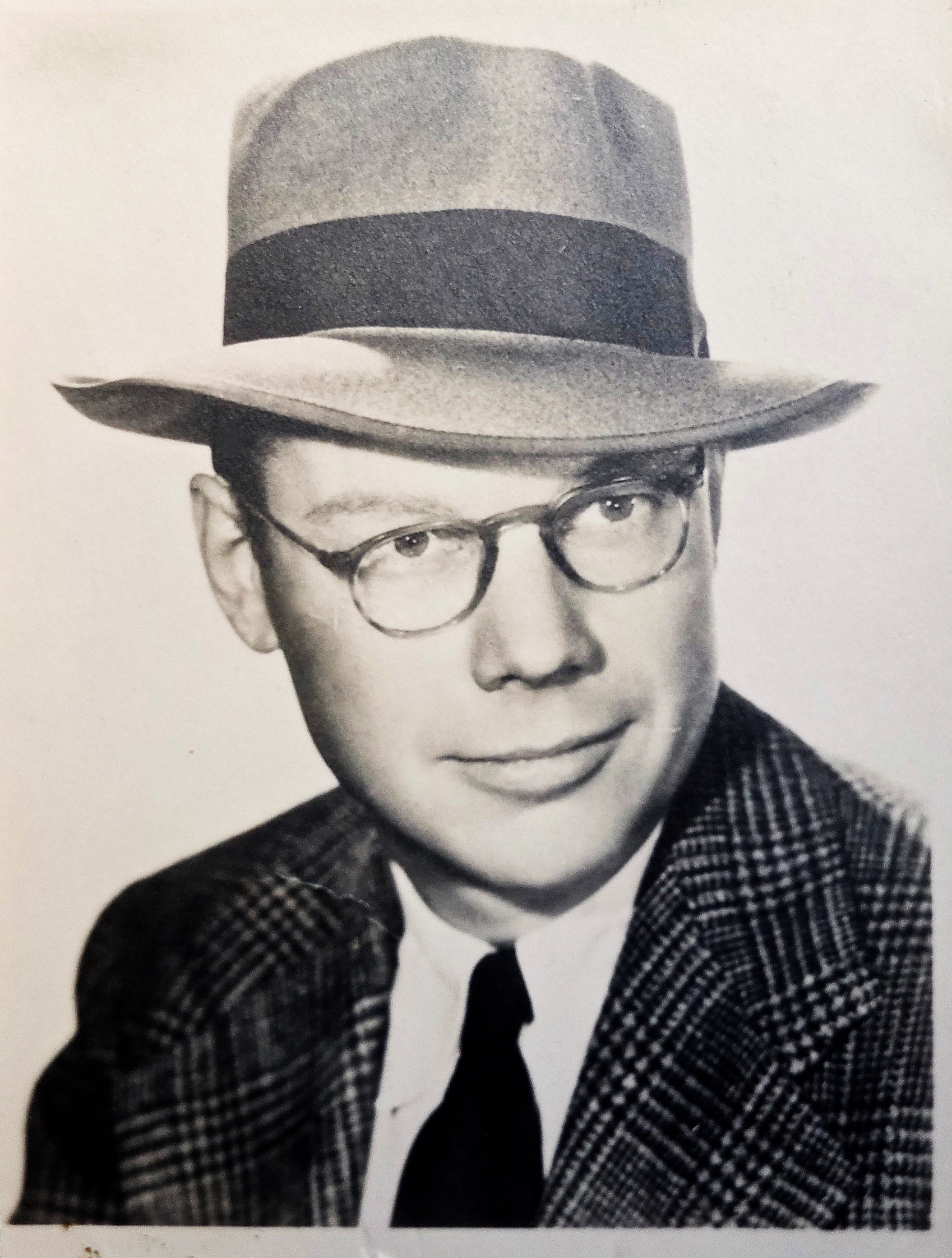
- Bassler in 1942 (20th Century Fox Studio image)
- Born: September 26, 1903; Washington, D.C., United States
- Died: November 8, 1975 (aged 72); Woodland Hills, Los Angeles, California, United States
- Other name: Robert S. Bassler

Robert Bassler (September 26, 1903 – November 8, 1975) was an American film and television producer.

== Select credits ==
- Kangaroo (1952)
- Molly and Me (1945)
