= List of three-strip Technicolor films =

The table lists some of the films produced in Technicolor Process 4 between 1932 and 1955. Most were filmed using three-strip Technicolor cameras though a few had sequences, or even their entirety, filmed using other techniques. These included:

Successive Frame (SF) Camera (or Successive Exposure Camera)

The first full-color animations were photographed using three-strip cameras. From 1934, animations were filmed using modified black and white cameras taking successive exposures through three color filters on a single panchromatic film, being simpler to operate and far less expensive. The technique lasted until 1973 (Robin Hood, Disney).

Kodachrome and Technicolor Monopack

These were the same positive cine stock marketed as 'Kodachrome Commercial' in 16mm and, by an agreement between Eastman Kodak and Technicolor, as 'Technicolor Monopack' in 35mm. When all in lowercase, 'monopack' is a generic term. When using a leading capital letter, 'Monopack' is a trade-mark of Technicolor.

Technichrome

Technichrome was a bipack system developed by Technicolor Ltd in England to photograph the 1948 Olympic Games because there were only four three-strip cameras in the UK at that time. Technichrome used 20 modified black and white cameras, Newall BNCs, built by Newall Engineering based on the Mitchell Camera which the Mitchell Camera Company had failed to patent in the UK.

All films listed were release printed from three (including those in bipack Technichrome) color matrices in Technicolor's dye-transfer process in either Hollywood or England. Matrices were exchanged between the plants for release prints in their respective markets. Technicolor plants were opened in France and Italy in 1955, the French laboratory closing in 1958.

Technicolor Process 5 described films filmed using Eastmancolor monopack negative film, with negative processing and dye-transfer printing by Technicolor; these films were usually credited Color by Technicolor. Technicolor also dye-transfer printed Eastmancolor and Ansco negative films where the negative had been processed by another laboratory with the credit Print by Technicolor. Technicolor publicity dated 1954 added the facility to produce dye transfer release prints from Agfacolor, Gevacolor and Ferraniacolor color negative stock, popular in Europe. No films originating on color negative film are intentionally listed here.

The first film using Process 4 and the three-strip camera was the 1932 animated short Flowers and Trees, whereas the first live-action feature was Becky Sharp, released in 1935.

Cinematographers listed in italics are associate photographers, usually employed by Technicolor. Cinematographers in bold are Academy Award Winners for that year.

Film	Studio	Year	Genre	Type	Cinematographer	Lab
Flowers and Trees (first use of three-strip camera)	Walt Disney Productions, United Artists	1932	Animation, Comedy, Family, Musical, Romance, Short	Short	Ray Rennahan	US
The Cat and the Fiddle	Metro-Goldwyn-Mayer	1934	Comedy, Musical, Romance, Drama	Sequence	Charles G. Clarke, Harold Rosson, Ray Rennahan (Tech sequence)	US
La Cucaracha	Pioneer Pictures, RKO Radio Pictures	1934	Comedy, Musical	Short	Ray Rennahan	US
Good Morning, Eve!	Vitaphone, Warner Bros.	1934	Comedy, Musical	Short	Ray Rennahan	US
The House of Rothschild	20th Century Pictures, United Artists	1934	Biography, Drama, History, War	Finale	Peverell Marley, Ray Rennahan (Tech finale)	US
Hollywood Party	Metro-Goldwyn-Mayer, Walt Disney Productions	1934	Part animation, Comedy, Family, Musical	Sequence	James Wong Howe (B&W live-action sequences)	US
Service with a Smile	Vitaphone, Warner Bros.	1934	Comedy, Musical	Short	Ray Rennahan	US
What, No Men!	Vitaphone, Warner Bros.	1934	Comedy, Musical	Short	Ray Rennahan	US
Kid Millions	Howard Productions, United Artists	1934	Comedy, Musical	Last Reel	Ray June, Ray Rennahan (Tech last reel)	US
Star Night at the Cocoanut Grove	Metro-Goldwyn Meyer	1934	Comedy, Musical	Short	Ray Rennahan, William V. Skall	US
Becky Sharp (first live-action feature)	Pioneer Pictures, RKO Radio Pictures	1935	Drama, Romance, War	Feature	Ray Rennahan	US
Gypsy Sweetheart	Vitaphone, Warner Bros.	1935	Musical, Comedy, Dance	Short	William V. Skall	US
The Little Colonel	Fox Film	1935	Comedy, Family	Sequence	Arthur C. Miller, William V. Skall (Tech sequence)	US
Show Kids	Vitaphone, Warner Bros.	1935	Musical	Short	Ray Rennahan	US
Dancing Pirate	Pioneer Pictures, RKO Radio Pictures	1936	Adventure, Comedy, Musical, Romance	Feature	William V. Skall	US
Fox Hunt **[View]**	London Films, United Artists	1936	Animation	Short		US
The Garden of Allah	Selznick International Pictures, United Artists	1936	Adventure, Drama, Romance	Feature	Virgil Miller, **W. Howard Greene**, **Harold Rosson**, Wilfrid M. Cline	US
Ramona	20th Century-Fox	1936	Drama, Romance	Feature	William V. Skall	US
The Trail of the Lonesome Pine	Walter Wanger Productions, Paramount Pictures	1936	Drama, Romance	Feature	Robert C. Bruce, W. Howard Greene	US
The Coronation (of King George VI)	British Movietone News, 20th Century-Fox	1937	Documentary	Short		US
Ebb Tide	Paramount Pictures	1937	Adventure, Drama, Romance	Feature	Ray Rennahan, Leo Tover	US
God's Country and the Woman	Warner Bros.	1937	Drama, Romance	Feature	Tony Gaudio, William V. Skall, Allen M. Davey, Wilfrid M. Cline	US
Nothing Sacred	Selznick International Pictures, United Artists	1937	Comedy, Drama, Fantasy, Romance	Feature	W. Howard Greene	US
A Star is Born	Selznick International Pictures, United Artists	1937	Drama, Romance	Feature	**W. Howard Greene**	US
Victoria the Great	Imperator Film Productions, RKO Radio Pictures	1937	Drama, History	Last Reel	Freddie Young, William V. Skall (Tech last reel)	Eng
Vogues of 1938	Walter Wanger Productions, United Artists	1937	Comedy, Musical, Romance	Feature	Ray Rennahan, Winton C. Hoch	US
When's Your Birthday?	David L. Loew Productions, RKO Radio Pictures	1937	Comedy, Romance	Cartoon Sequence	George Robinson (cinematographer) (B&W live action)	US
Wings of the Morning (first UK feature)	New World Pictures, 20th Century-Fox	1937	Drama, Romance, Sport, War	Feature	Ray Rennahan	US (Note: Technicolor's English laboratory was then under construction.)
Snow White and the Seven Dwarfs (first feature animation, SE camera)	Walt Disney Productions, RKO Radio Pictures	1937	Animation, Fantasy, Drama, Musical, Romance	Feature		US
What-Ho-She-Bumps **[View]**	George Pal, JWT	1937	Stop motion animation	Commercial		Eng
The Adventures of Robin Hood	Warner Bros.	1938	Action, Adventure, Romance	Feature	Tony Gaudio, Sol Polito, W. Howard Greene	US
The Adventures of Tom Sawyer	Selznick International Pictures, United Artists	1938	Family, Adventure	Feature	James Wong Howe, Wilfrid M. Cline	US
Arabian Bazaar	World Window, United Artists	1938	Travelogue	Short	Jack Cardiff	Eng
Delhi **[View]**	World Window, United Artists	1938	Travelogue	Short	Jack Cardiff	Eng
The Divorce of Lady X	London Film Productions, United Artists	1938	Comedy, Drama, Romance	Feature	Harry Stradling Sr., William V. Skall	Eng
The Drum aka Drums (US)	London Film Productions, United Artists	1938	Adventure, War	Feature	Georges Périnal, Osmond Borradaile	Eng
The Eternal Fire	World Window, United Artists	1938	Travelogue	Short	Jack Cardiff	Eng
Fox Hunting in the Roman Compagna	World Window, United Artists	1938	Travelogue	Short	Jack Cardiff	Eng
Gold is Where You Find It	Warner Bros.	1938	Drama, History, Romance, Western	Feature	Sol Polito, Allen M. Davey	US
The Goldwyn Follies	Samuel Goldwyn Productions, United Artists	1938	Musical, Romance	Feature	Gregg Toland, Ray Rennahan	US
Heart of the North	Warner Bros.	1938	Adventure, Western	Feature	L. William O'Connell, Wilfrid M. Cline	US
Her Jungle Love	Paramount Pictures	1938	Action, Adventure, Music, Romance	Feature	Ray Rennahan	US
Indian Durbar **[View]**	World Window, United Artists	1938	Travelogue	Short	Jack Cardiff	Eng
Jerusalem	World Window, United Artists	1938	Travelogue	Short	Jack Cardiff	Eng
Kentucky	20th Century-Fox	1938	Drama, Romance, Sport	Feature	Ernest Palmer, Ray Rennahan	US
Men with Wings	Paramount Pictures	1938	Action, Drama, War	Feature	W. Howard Greene, Wilfrid M. Kline, Charles A. Marshall	US
Music Man (SF Camera) **[View]**	British Animated Films	1938	Animation	Short		Eng
Paris on Parade	Traveltalks, Metro-Goldwyn-Meyer	1938	Travelogue	Short	Jack Cardiff	?
Petra	World Window, United Artists	1938	Travelogue	Short	Jack Cardiff	Eng
A Road in India **[View]**	World Window, United Artists	1938	Travelogue	Short	Jack Cardiff	Eng
Rome Symphonies	World Window, United Artists	1938	Travelogue	Short	Jack Cardiff	Eng
Ruins of Palmyra and Baalbek	World Window, United Artists	1938	Travelogue	Short	Jack Cardiff	Eng
The Sacred Ganges	World Window, United Artists	1938	Travelogue	Short	Jack Cardiff	Eng
Sixty Glorious Years aka Queen of Destiny (US)	Imperator Film Productions, RKO Radio Pictures	1938	Drama	Feature	Freddie Young, William V. Skall	Eng
South Sea Sweethearts **[View]**	George Pal, JWT	1938	Stop motion animation	Commercial		Eng
Sweethearts	Metro-Goldwyn-Mayer	1938	Musical	Feature	**Oliver T. Marsh**, **Allen M. Davey**	US
Temples of India **[View]**	World Window, United Artists	1938	Travelogue	Short	Jack Cardiff	Eng
Valley of the Giants	Warner Bros.	1938	Adventure	Feature	Sol Polito, Allen M. Davey	US
A Village in India **[View]**	World Window, United Artists	1938	Travelogue	Short	Jack Cardiff	Eng
Wanderers of the Desert	World Window, United Artists	1938	Travelogue	Short	Jack Cardiff	Eng
Dodge City	Warner Bros.	1939	Western	Feature	Sol Polito, Ray Rennahan	US
Drums Along the Mohawk	20th Century-Fox	1939	Drama, History, Romance, War, Western	Feature	Bert Glennon, Ray Rennahan	US
The Four Feathers	London Film Productions, United Artists	1939	Adventure, Drama, Romance, War	Feature	Georges Périnal, Osmond Borradaile	Eng
Gone With the Wind	Selznick International Pictures, Metro-Goldwyn-Mayer	1939	Drama, History, Romance, War	Feature	Ernest Haller, Lee Garmes, Ray Rennahan, Wilfrid M. Cline	US
Gulliver's Travels (SF camera)	Fleischer Studios, Paramount Pictures	1939	Animation, Adventure, Comedy, Family, Fantasy, Musical, Romance	Feature	Charles Schettler	US
Hollywood Cavalcade	20th Century-Fox	1939	Comedy, Drama, History	Feature	Allen M. Davey, Ernest Palmer	US
The Ice Follies of 1939	Metro-Goldwyn-Mayer	1939	Drama, Music, Romance	Finale	Joseph Ruttenberg, Oliver T. Marsh (Tech finale)	US
Jesse James	20th Century-Fox	1939	Biography, Crime, Drama, History, Western	Feature	George Barnes, W. Howard Greene	US
Jungle	World Window, United Artists	1939	Travelogue	Short	Jack Cardiff	Eng
The Little Princess	20th Century-Fox	1939	Comedy, Drama, Family, Musical	Feature	Arthur C. Miller, William V. Skall	US
Love on the Range **[View]**	George Pal, JWT	1939	Stop motion animation	Commercial		Eng
The Mikado	G and S Films, General Film Distributors (UK), Universal Pictures (US)	1939	Musical, Comedy	Feature	Bernard Knowles, William V. Skall	Eng
Over the Moon	London Film Productions, United Artists	1939	Comedy	Feature	Harry Stradling Sr.	Eng
The Private Lives of Elizabeth and Essex	Warner Bros.	1939	Biography, Drama, History, Romance	Feature	Sol Polito, W. Howard Greene	US
River Thames **[View]**	World Window, United Artists	1939	Travelogue	Short	Jack Cardiff	Eng
Swanee River	20th Century-Fox	1939	Biography, Drama	Feature	Bert Glennon	US
The Wizard of Oz	Metro-Goldwyn-Mayer	1939	Adventure, Family, Fantasy, Musical	Feature	Harold Rosson, Allen M. Davey	US
The Women	Metro-Goldwyn-Mayer	1939	Comedy, Drama	Sequence	Oliver T. Marsh, Joseph Ruttenberg	US
Bitter Sweet	Metro-Goldwyn-Mayer	1940	Drama, Musical, Romance	Feature	Oliver T. Marsh, Allen M. Davey	US
The Blue Bird	20th Century-Fox	1940	Adventure, Comedy, Family, Fantasy	Feature	Arthur C. Miller, Ray Rennahan	US
Chad Hanna	20th Century-Fox	1940	Drama, Romance	Feature	Ernest Palmer, Ray Rennahan	US
Dr. Cyclops	Paramount Pictures	1940	Adventure, Drama, Horror, Sci-Fi	Feature	Henry Sharp, Winton C. Hoch	US
Down Argentine Way	20th Century-Fox	1940	Comedy, Drama, Musical, Romance, Sport	Feature	Leon Shamroy, Ray Rennahan	US
Every Man His Own Housewife **[View]**	Merton Park Studios, Lintas	1940		Commercial		Eng
Fantasia (SF camera & three-strip)	Walt Disney Productions, RKO Radio Pictures	1940	Animation, Family, Fantasy, Music, War	Feature	Ray Rennahan (live-action three-strip)	US
Irene	Imperadio Pictures, RKO Radio Pictures	1940	Comedy, Musical, Romance	Sequence	Russell Metty	US
Maryland	20th Century-Fox	1940	Drama	Feature	George Barnes, Ray Rennahan	US
North West Mounted Police	Paramount Pictures	1940	Action, Adventure, Drama, History, Romance, Western	Feature	W. Howard Greene, Victor Milner	US
Northwest Passage	Metro-Goldwyn-Mayer	1940	Adventure, Drama, History, Romance, War, Western	Feature	William V. Skall	US
Peasant Island	Merton Park Studios, Cadbury Bros.	1940	Sponsored documentary	Short	Jack Cardiff, Osmond Borradaile	Eng
Pinocchio (SF camera)	Walt Disney Productions, RKO Radio Pictures	1940	Animation, Adventure, Fantasy, Musical	Feature		US
The Return of Frank James	20th Century-Fox	1940	Crime, History, Western	Feature	George Barnes, William V. Skall	US
Service with the Colors	Warner Bros.	1940	Army Recruiting	Short	Charles P. Boyle	US
The Thief of Bagdad	Alexander Korda Film Productions, United Artists	1940	Adventure, Family, Fantasy	Feature	**Georges Périnal**, Osmond Borradaile	Eng/US (Note: Production moved to Hollywood in 1939.)
Typhoon	Paramount Pictures	1940	Adventure	Feature	William C. Mellor, Allen M. Davey	US
Untamed	Paramount Pictures	1940	Adventure, Drama, Romance	Feature	Leo Tover, W. Howard Greene	US
Aloma of the South Seas	Paramount Pictures	1941	Adventure	Feature	Karl Struss, Wilfrid M. Cline, William E. Snyder	US
Bahama Passage	Paramount Pictures	1941	Drama, Romance	Feature	Leo Tover, Allen M. Davey	US
Belle Star	20th Century-Fox	1941	Western	Feature	Ernest Palmer, Ray Rennahan	US
Billy the Kid	Metro-Goldwyn-Mayer	1941	Biography, Drama, Western	Feature	Leonard Smith, William V. Skall	US
Blood and Sand	20th Century-Fox	1941	Drama, Sport	Feature	**Ernest Palmer**, **Ray Rennahan**	US
Blossoms in the Dust	Metro-Goldwyn-Mayer	1941	Biography, Drama, Romance	Feature	Karl Freund, W. Howard Greene	US
Border Weave **[View]**	Turner Film Company, British Council	1941	Documentary	Short	Jack Cardiff	Eng
Carnival in the Clothes Cupboard (SF camera) **[View]**	Halas and Batchelor, JWT	1941	Animation	Commercial		Eng
Dive Bomber (part Monopack)	Warner Bros.	1941	Drama, War	Feature	Bert Glennon, Winton C. Hoch	US
Dumbo (SF camera)	Walt Disney Productions, RKO Radio Pictures	1941	Animation, Musical, Fantasy	Feature		US
Fiesta	Hal Roach Studios, United Artists	1941	Comedy, Musical, Romance	Feature	Alfred Gilks, Robert Pittack	US
Louisiana Purchase	Paramount Pictures	1941	Comedy, Musical	Feature	Ray Rennahan, Harry Hallenberger	US
Moon Over Miami	20th Century-Fox	1941	Comedy, Musical, Romance	Feature	Peverell Marley, Allen M. Davey, Leon Shamroy	US
Mr. Bug Goes to Town (SF camera)	Fleischer Studios, Paramount Pictures	1941	Animation, Fantasy, Musical, Romance	Feature	Charles Schettler	US
Plastic Surgery in Wartime	Realist Film Unit	1941	Documentary	Short	Jack Cardiff	Eng
The Reluctant Dragon (part B&W, part three-strip, part SE camera)	Walt Disney Productions, RKO Radio Pictures	1941	Live-action/Animation, Comedy, Family	Feature	Bert Glennon, Winton C. Hoch (live-action three-strip)	US
The Shepherd of the Hills	Paramount Pictures	1941	Adventure, Drama, Romance, Western	Feature	Charles Lang, W. Howard Greene,	US
Smilin' Through	Metro-Goldwyn-Mayer	1941	Musical, War, Fantasy, Romance	Feature	Leonard Smith (Note: Oliver T. Marsh was assigned to photograph the film, but died of a heart attack in the M-G-M studio commissary on 5 May 1941. It is unclear whether or not Marsh had actually started shooting the film prior to his death.)	US
That Night in Rio	20th Century-Fox	1941	Comedy, Musical	Feature	Leon Shamroy, Ray Rennahan	US
Virginia	Paramount Pictures	1941	Drama, Romance	Feature	Bert Glennon, William V. Skall	US
Week-End in Havana	20th Century-Fox	1941	Comedy, Musical	Feature	Ernest Palmer	US
The Western Isles **[View]**	Merton Park Studios, British Council	1941	Documentary	Short	Jack Cardiff	Eng
Western Union	20th Century-Fox	1941	History, Western	Feature	Edward Cronjager, Allen M. Davey	US
Wings of Steel	Warner Bros	1941	AAC recruiting	Short	Wilfrid M. Cline	US
Aladdin and the Junior Genie **[View]**	Anson Dyer, JWT	1941	Animation	Commercial		Eng
Arabian Nights (1942 film)	Universal Pictures	1942	Action, Adventure, Comedy	Feature	Milton Krasner, William V Skall, W. Howard Greene	US
Bambi (SF camera)	Walt Disney Productions, RKO Radio Pictures	1942	Animation, Drama, Musical	Feature		US
The Battle of Midway (16mm Kodachrome original)	United States Navy, 20th Century-Fox	1942	Documentary	Short		US
Beyond the Blue Horizon	Paramount Pictures	1942	Action, Adventure, Comedy, Drama, Fantasy, Romance	Feature	William C. Mellor, Charles P. Boyle	US
The Black Swan	20th Century-Fox	1942	Action, Adventure, Drama	Feature	**Leon Shamroy**	US
Captains of the Clouds (part Monopack)	Warner Bros.	1942	Action, Drama, War	Feature	WilfrId M. Cline, Sol Polito	US
Colour in Clay **[View]**	British Instructional Films, British Council	1942	Documentary	Short	Jack Cardiff	Eng
Fable of the Fabrics (SF camera) **[View]**	Halas and Batchelor, JWT	1942	Animation	Commercial		Eng
The Forest Rangers (part Monopack)	Paramount Pictures	1942	Action, Drama	Feature	William V. Skall, Charles Lang	US
Gardens of England **[View]**	Spectator Short Films, British Council	1942	Documentary	Short	Geoffrey Unsworth	Eng
The Great Mr. Handel	G.H.W. Productions, General Film Distributors	1942	Biography, History, Drama	Feature	Claude Friese-Greene, Jack Cardiff	Eng
Jungle Book	Alexander Korda Films, United Artists	1942	Action, Adventure, Family	Feature	Lee Garmes, W. Howard Greene	US
The Moon and Sixpence	David L. Lowe-Albert Lewin, United Artists	1942	Drama, Romance	Final Reel	John F. Seitz	US
My Gal Sal	20th Century-Fox	1942	Biography, Comedy, Musical	Feature	Ernest Palmer	US
The People's Land **[View]**	Strand Films, British Council	1942	Documentary	Short	Geoffrey Unsworth	Eng
Reap the Wild Wind	Paramount Pictures	1942	Action, Adventure, Drama, Romance	Feature	Victor Milner, William V. Skall	US
Saludos Amigos (SF camera, live-action sequences on 16mm Kodachrome)	Walt Disney Productions, RKO Radio Pictures	1942	Animation, Fantasy, Musical	Feature		US
Song of the Islands	20th Century-Fox	1942	Comedy, Musical, Romance	Feature	Ernest Palmer	US
Springtime in the Rockies	20th Century-Fox	1942	Musical	Feature	Ernest Palmer	US
Symphony in Colour **[View]**	Public Relationship Films, Lintas	1942		Commercial	Geoffrey Unsworth	Eng
Teeth of Steel **[View]**	Technique Films, British Council	1942	Documentary	Short	Geoffrey Unsworth	Eng
This is Colour	Strand Film Company, ICI	1942	Sponsored documentary	Short	Jack Cardiff	Eng
Thunder Birds: Soldiers of Air	20th Century-Fox	1942	Drama, Romance, War	Feature	Ernest Palmer, Harry Jackson	US
To the Shores of Tripoli	20th Century-Fox	1942	Drama, Romance, War	Feature	Edward Cronjager, William V. Skall, Harry Jackson	US
World Garden **[View]**	Spectator Short Films, British Council	1942	Documentary	Short	Geoffrey Unsworth	Eng
Best Foot Forward	Metro-Goldwyn-Mayer	1943	Musical, Comedy	Feature	Leonard Smith	US
Coney Island	20th Century-Fox	1943	Musical, Comedy	Feature	Ernest Palmer	US
Crash Dive	20th Century-Fox	1943	Action, Adventure, Drama, Romance, Thriller, War	Feature	Leon Shamroy	US
The Desert Song	Warner Bros.	1943	Musical	Feature	Bert Glennon	US
The Desperadoes	Columbia Pictures	1943	Action, Comedy, Romance, Western	Feature	George Meehan, Allen M Davey	US
Dixie	Paramount Pictures	1943	Biography, Comedy, Musical	Feature	William C. Mellor	US
Du Barry Was a Lady	Metro-Goldwyn-Mayer	1943	Comedy, Fantasy, Musical	Feature	Karl Freund	US
For Whom the Bell Tolls	Paramount Pictures	1943	Adventure, Drama, History, Romance, War	Feature	Ray Rennahan	US
The Gang's All Here	20th Century-Fox	1943	Comedy, Musical, Romance	Feature	Edward Cronjager	US
Happy Go Lucky	Paramount Pictures	1943	Comedy, Musical	Feature	Wilfrid M. Cline, Karl Struss	US
Heaven Can Wait	20th Century-Fox	1943	Comedy, Drama, Fantasy, Romance	Feature	Edward Cronjager	US
Hello, Frisco, Hello	20th Century-Fox	1943	Comedy, Musical, Romance	Feature	Charles G. Clarke, Allen M. Davey	US
Lassie Come Home (part Monopack)	Metro-Goldwyn-Mayer	1943	Adventure, Family	Feature	Charles P. Boyle, Leonard Smith	US
The Life and Death of Colonel Blimp	The Archers, General Film Distributors	1943	Drama, Romance, War	Feature	Georges Périnal	Eng
My Friend Flicka	20th Century-Fox	1943	Family, Western	Feature	Dewey Wrigley, Edward Cronjager, Virgil E. Miller	US
The People's Land **[View]**	Strand Films, British Council	1943	Documentary	Short	Geoffrey Unsworth	Eng
Phantom of the Opera	Universal Pictures	1943	Drama, Horror, Music, Romance, Thriller	Feature	**W. Howard Greene**, **Hal Mohr**	US
Power on the Land **[View]**	Raylton, Verity Films, British Council	1943	Documentary	Short	Geoffrey Unsworth	Eng
Report from the Aleutians (16mm Kodachrome original) **[View]**	US Army Signal Corps	1943	Documentary	Feature	Jules Buck	US
Riding High	Paramount Pictures	1943	Comedy, Musical	Feature	Karl Struss, Harry Hallenberger	US
Salute to the Marines	Metro-Goldwyn-Mayer	1943	War, Drama	Feature	Charles Schoenbaum, W. Howard Greene	US
Scottish Mazuka **[View]**	Seven-League Productions	1943	Documentary	Short	Jack Cardiff, Geoffrey Unsworth	Eng
Sweet Rosie O'Grady	20th Century-Fox	1943	Musical	Feature	Ernest Palmer	US
This is the Army	Warner Bros.	1943	Comedy, Musical, War	Feature	Bert Glennon, Sol Polito	US
Thousands Cheer	Metro-Goldwyn-Mayer	1943	Comedy, Drama, Family, Musical, Romance	Feature	George J. Folsey	US
Victory Through Air Power (SF camera & three-strip)	Walt Disney Productions, United Artists	1943	Animation, Documentary	Feature	Ray Rennahan (live-action three-strip)	US
White Savage	Universal Pictures	1943	Adventure	Feature	Lester White, William E. Snyder	US
Ali Baba and the Forty Thieves	Universal Pictures	1944	Adventure, Fantasy, Romance	Feature	George Robinson, W. Howard Greene	US
An American Romance	Metro-Goldwyn-Mayer	1944	Biography, Drama	Feature	Harold Rosson	US
Bathing Beauty	Metro-Goldwyn-Mayer	1944	Comedy, Musical	Feature	Harry Stradling Sr.	US
Belle of the Yukon	International Pictures, RKO Radio Pictures	1944	Comedy, Musical, Romance	Feature	Ray Rennahan	US
Broadway Rhythm	Metro-Goldwyn-Mayer	1944	Family, Musical	Feature	Leonard Smith	US
Buffalo Bill	20th Century-Fox	1944	Biography, Romance, Western	Feature	Leon Shamroy	US
Can't Help Singing	Universal Pictures	1944	Musical, Western	Feature	Elwood Bredell, W. Howard Greene	US
The Climax	Universal Pictures	1944	Horror, Musical, Thriller	Feature	Hal Mohr, W Howard Greene	US
Cobra Woman	Universal Pictures	1944	Adventure, Drama	Feature	George Robinson, W. Howard Greene	US
Cover Girl	Columbia Pictures	1944	Comedy, Musical, Romance	Feature	Allen M. Davey, Rudolph Maté	US
The Fighting Lady (16mm Kodachrome original) **[View]**	Louis de Rochemont Associates, 20th Century-Fox	1944	‘Docudrama’	Feature		US
Frenchman's Creek	Paramount Pictures	1944	Adventure, Drama, Romance	Feature	George Barnes	US
The Green Girdle **[View]**	Strand Films, British Council	1944	Documentary	Short	Jack Cardiff	Eng
Greenwich Village	20th Century-Fox	1944	Musical	Feature	Harry Jackson, Leon Shamroy	US
Gypsy Wildcat	Universal Pictures	1944	Adventure	Feature	W. Howard Greene, George Robinson	US
Henry V	Two Cities Films, General Film Distributors (UK), United Artists (US)	1944	History, Shakespeare	Feature	Robert Krasker	Eng
Home in Indiana	20th Century-Fox	1944	Adventure, Drama, Romance	Feature	Edward Cronjager	US
Irish Eyes Are Smiling	20th Century-Fox	1944	Drama, Music, Romance	Feature	Harry Jackson, Edward Cronjager	US
Kismet	Metro-Goldwyn-Mayer	1944	Adventure, Fantasy	Feature	Charles Rosher	US
Lady in the Dark	Paramount Pictures	1944	Drama, Musical, Romance	Feature	Ray Rennahan	US
Meet Me in St. Louis	Metro-Goldwyn-Mayer	1944	Comedy, Drama, Family, Musical, Romance	Feature	George J. Folsey	US
The Memphis Belle: A Story of a Flying Fortress (16mm Kodachrome original)	US War Department, Paramount Pictures	1944	Documentary	Feature		US
National Velvet	Metro-Goldwyn-Mayer	1944	Drama, Family, Sport	Feature	Leonard Smith	US
Pin Up Girl	20th Century-Fox	1944	Comedy, Musical, Romance, War	Feature	Ernest Palmer	US
The Princess and the Pirate	Samuel Goldwyn Productions, RKO Radio Pictures	1944	Adventure, Comedy, Romance	Feature	Victor Milner, William E. Snyder	US
Rainbow Island	Paramount Pictures	1944	Comedy, Musical, Romance, War	Feature	Karl Struss	US
Shine on Harvest Moon	Warner Bros.	1944	Biography, Musical	Sequences	Arthur Edeson	US
Something for the Boys	20th Century-Fox	1944	Comedy, Musical	Feature	Ernest Palmer	US
The Story of Dr. Wassell	Paramount Pictures	1944	Action, Adventure, Drama, Romance, War, Western	Feature	Victor Milner, William E. Snyder	US
This Happy Breed	Cineguild Productions, General Film Distributors	1944	Comedy, Drama	Feature	Ronald Neame	Eng
The Three Caballeros (SF camera & three-strip)	Walt Disney Productions, RKO Radio Pictures	1944	Animation, Family, Fantasy, Musical	Feature	Ray Rennahan (live-action three-strip)	US
Up in Arms	Samuel Goldwyn Productions, RKO Radio Pictures	1944	Comedy, Musical	Feature	Ray Rennahan	US
Western Approaches aka The Raider (US) (part Monopack)	Crown Film Unit	1944	Documentary, Drama, War	Feature	Jack Cardiff	Eng
With the Marines at Tarawa (16mm Kodachrome & 35mm B/W)	United States Marine Corps, Universal Pictures	1944	Documentary	Short		US
Wilson	20th Century-Fox	1944	Biography, Drama, History, Musical, Romance	Feature	**Leon Shamroy**	US
Anchors Aweigh	Metro-Goldwyn-Mayer	1945	Comedy, Fantasy, Musical	Feature	Charles P. Boyle, Robert H. Planck	US
Blithe Spirit	Cineguild Productions, General Film Distributors	1945	Comedy, Fantasy	Feature	Ronald Neame	Eng
Bring on the Girls	Paramount Pictures	1945	Comedy, Musical	Feature	Karl Struss	US
Diamond Horseshoe aka Billy Rose's Diamond Horseshoe	20th Century-Fox	1945	Musical	Feature	Ernest Palmer	US
The Dolly Sisters	20th Century-Fox	1945	Biography, Drama, Musical, Romance	Feature	Ernest Palmer	US
Frontier Gal	Universal Pictures	1945	Western	Feature	George Robinson, Charles P. Boyle	US
Incendiary Blonde	Paramount Pictures	1945	Biography, Drama, Romance	Feature	Ray Rennahan	US
It's a Pleasure	International Pictures, RKO Radio Pictures	1945	Comedy, Musical	Feature	Ray Rennahan	US
Leave Her to Heaven	20th Century-Fox	1945	Drama, Film-Noir, Romance, Thriller	Feature	**Leon Shamroy**	US
Make Fruitful the Land **[View]**	Greenpark Productions, British Council	1945	Documentary	Short	Geoffrey Unsworth	Eng
Nob Hill	20th Century-Fox	1945	Drama, Musical	Feature	Edward Cronjager	US
The Picture of Dorian Gray	Metro-Goldwyn-Mayer	1945	Drama, Fantasy, Horror, Mystery, Romance, Thriller	Sequence	Harry Stradling Sr.	US
Salome, Where She Danced	Universal Pictures	1945	Adventure, Drama, Music, Romance, War, Western	Feature	W. Howard Greene, Hal Mohr	US
San Antonio	Warner Bros.	1945	Drama, Western	Feature	Bert Glennon	US
Son of Lassie (Monopack)	Metro-Goldwyn-Mayer	1945	Adventure, Drama, Family, War	Feature	Charles Edgar Schoenbaum	US
A Song to Remember	Columbia Pictures	1945	Biography, Drama, Music	Feature	Allen M. Davey, Tony Gaudio	US
The Spanish Main	RKO Radio Pictures	1945	Adventure, Drama, Romance	Feature	George Barnes	US
State Fair	20th Century-Fox	1945	Drama, Romance	Feature	Leon Shamroy	US
Steel **[View]**	Technique Film Productions, British Council	1945	Documentary	Short	Jack Cardiff, Cyril Knowles	Eng
Sudan	Universal Pictures	1945	Action, Adventure, Romance	Feature	George Robinson	US
A Thousand and One Nights	Columbia Pictures	1945	Adventure, Comedy, Fantasy	Feature	Ray Rennahan	US
Thrill of a Romance	Metro-Goldwyn-Mayer	1945	Musical, Romance	Feature	Harry Stradling Sr.	US
Thunderhead, Son of Flicka (Monopack)	20th Century-Fox	1945	Action, Drama, Family, Western	Feature	Charles G. Clarke	US
Tonight and Every Night	Columbia Pictures	1945	Drama	Feature	Rudolph Maté	US
Where Do We Go From Here?	20th Century-Fox	1945	Musical	Feature	Leon Shamroy	US
Wonder Man	Samuel Goldwyn Productions, RKO Radio Pictures	1945	Comedy, Fantasy, Musical	Feature	Victor Milner, William E. Snyder	US
Yolanda and the Thief	Metro-Goldwyn-Mayer	1945	Fantasy, Musical, Romance	Feature	Charles Rosher	US
The Bandit of Sherwood Forest	Columbia Pictures	1946	Action, Adventure, Family, History, Romance	Feature	Tony Gaudio, George Meehan, William E. Snyder	US
Bee-wise (SE Camera) **[View]**	Anson Dyer	1946	Animation	Commercial		Eng
Blue Skies	Paramount Pictures	1946	Comedy, Musical, Romance	Feature	Charles Lang, William E. Snyder	US
Caesar and Cleopatra	Pascal Film Productions, Eagle-Lion (UK), United Artists (US)	1946	Biography, Comedy, Drama, History, Romance, War	Feature	Jack Cardiff, Jack Hildyard, Robert Krasker, Freddie Young	Eng
Canyon Passage	Walter Wanger Pictures. Universal Pictures	1946	Drama, Western	Feature	Edward Cronjager	US
Centennial Summer	20th Century-Fox	1946	Musical, History, Romance	Feature	Ernest Palmer	US
Coco and the Bear (SE Camera) **[View]**	GB Animation	1946	Animation	Commercial		Eng
Courage of Lassie	Metro-Goldwyn-Mayer	1946	Drama, Adventure, Family, War	Feature	Leonard Smith	US
Do You Love Me	20th Century-Fox	1946	Musical	Feature	Edward Cronjager	US
Duel in the Sun	Vanguard Films, Selznick Releasing Organization	1946	Drama, Romance, Western	Feature	Lee Garmes, Ray Rennahan, Harold Rosson	US
Easy to Wed (Monopack)	Metro-Goldwyn-Mayer	1946	Comedy, Romance	Feature	Harry Stradling Sr.	US
The Harvey Girls	Metro-Goldwyn-Mayer	1946	Comedy, Musical, Western	Feature	George J. Folsey	US
Holiday in Mexico	Metro-Goldwyn-Mayer	1946	Comedy, Musical, Romance	Feature	Harry Stradling Sr.	US
I've Always Loved You	Frank Borzage Productions, Republic Pictures	1946	Drama, Musical, Romance	Feature	Tony Gaudio	US
The Jolson Story	Columbia Pictures	1946	Biography, Drama, Music	Feature	Joseph Walker	US
The Kid From Brooklyn	Samuel Goldwyn Productions, RKO Radio Pictures	1946	Comedy, Musical	Feature	Gregg Toland	US
The Laughing Lady	British National Films, Anglo-American Film Corporation	1946	Drama, Musical	Feature	Geoffrey Unsworth	Eng
London Town aka My Heart Goes Crazy	Wesley Ruggles Productions, General Film Distributors	1946	Comedy, Musical	Feature	Erwin Hillier	Eng
Make Mine Music (SF camera)	Walt Disney Productions, RKO Radio Pictures	1946	Animation, Anthology	Feature		US
Margie	20th Century-Fox	1946	Comedy	Feature	Charles G. Clarke	US
A Matter of Life and Death aka Stairway to Heaven (US)	The Archers, General Film Distributors (UK), Universal Pictures (US)	1946	Comedy, Drama, Fantasy, Drama, War	Feature	Jack Cardiff	Eng
Meet the Navy	British National Films, Anglo-American Film Corporation	1946	Wartime revue, Musical	Last Reel	Ernest Palmer, Geoffrey Unsworth (Technicolor Photography)	Eng
Men of Two Worlds aka Kisenga, Man of Africa (part Monopack) **[View]**	Two Cities Films, General Film Distributors	1946	Drama	Feature	Desmond Dickinson	Eng
Night and Day	Warner Bros.	1946	Biography, Drama, Musical	Feature	J. Peverell Marley, William V. Skall, Bert Glennon	US
Night in Paradise	Walter Wanger Productions, Universal Pictures	1946	Comedy, Drama	Feature	Hal Mohr, W. Howard Greene	US
Renegades	Columbia Pictures	1946	Drama, Western	Feature	William E. Snyder	US
Smoky	20th Century-Fox	1946	Drama, Family	Feature	Charles G. Clarke	US
Song of the South (SF camera & three-strip)	Walt Disney Productions, RKO Radio Pictures	1946	Animation, Family, Musical	Feature	Gregg Toland (live-action three-strip)	US
Three Little Girls in Blue	20th Century-Fox	1946	Musical	Feature	Ernest Palmer	US
Till the Clouds Roll By	Metro-Goldwyn-Mayer	1946	Biography, Musical	Feature	George J. Folsey, Harry Stradling Sr.	US
The Time, the Place and the Girl	Warner Bros.	1946	Musical, Comedy, Romance	Feature	Arthur Edeson, William V. Skall	US
Train Trouble (SF camera) **[View]**	Halas and Batchelor, JWT	1946	Animation	Commercial		Eng
The Virginian	Paramount Pictures	1946	Romance, Western	Feature	Harry Hallenberger	US
Wake Up and Dream	20th Century-Fox	1946	Drama	Feature	Harry Jackson	US
The Yearling	Metro-Goldwyn-Mayer	1946	Drama, Family	Feature	**Arthur E. Arling**, **Charles Rosher**, **Leonard Smith**	US
Ziegfeld Follies	Metro-Goldwyn-Mayer	1946	Comedy, Musical	Feature	George J. Folsey, Ray June, Charles Rosher	US
Black Narcissus	The Archers, General Film Distributors	1947	Drama	Feature	**Jack Cardiff**	Eng
Blanche Fury	Cineguild, General Film Distributors	1947	Crime, Drama, Mystery, Romance	Feature	Guy Green, Geoffrey Unsworth (exteriors)	Eng
California	Paramount Pictures	1947	Romance, Western	Feature	Ray Rennahan	US
Captain from Castile	20th Century-Fox	1947	Adventure, Drama, History	Feature	Arthur E. Arling, Charles G. Clarke	US
Carnival in Costa Rica	20th Century-Fox	1947	Musical	Feature	Harry Jackson	US
Desert Fury	Paramount Pictures	1947	Crime, Drama, Film-Noir, Romance, Thriller	Feature	Edward Cronjager, Charles Lang	US
Dolly Put the Kettle On **[View]**	Halas and Batchelor	1947	Animation	Commercial		Eng
Down to Earth	Columbia Pictures	1947	Comedy, Fantasy, Musical, Romance	Feature	Rudolph Maté	US
Fiesta	Metro-Goldwyn-Mayer	1947	Drama, Musical, Romance, Sport	Feature	Wilfrid M. Cline, Charles Rosher, Sydney Wagner	US
Forever Amber	20th Century-Fox	1947	Adventure, Drama, History	Feature	Leon Shamroy	US
Fun and Fancy Free (SF camera & three-strip)	Walt Disney Productions, RKO Radio Pictures	1947	Animation, Family, Musical	Feature	Charles P. Boyle (live-action three-strip)	US
Good News	Metro-Goldwyn-Mayer	1947	Comedy, Musical, Romance, Sport	Feature	Charles Edgar Schoenbaum	US
The Homestretch	20th Century-Fox	1947	Drama	Feature	Arthur E. Arling	US
I Wonder Who's Kissing Her Now	20th Century-Fox	1947	Musical	Feature	Ernest Palmer	US
An Ideal Husband	London Films, British Lion	1947	Comedy	Feature	Georges Périnal	Eng
Jassy	Gainsborough Pictures, General Film Distributors	1947	Drama, Romance	Feature	Geoffrey Unsworth	Eng
Life with Father	Warner Bros.	1947	Comedy	Feature	J. Peverell Marley, William V. Skall	US
The Man Within aka The Smugglers	Triton Films, General Film Distributors	1947	Adventure, Crime, Drama	Feature	Geoffrey Unsworth	Eng
Mother Wore Tights	20th Century-Fox	1947	Musical	Feature	Harry Jackson	US
My Wild Irish Rose	Warner Bros.	1947	Biography, Musical	Feature	Arthur Edeson, William V. Skall	US
The Perils of Pauline	Paramount Pictures	1947	Biography, Comedy	Feature	Ray Rennahan	US
Pirates of Monterey	Universal-International	1947	Western	Feature	W. Howard Greene, Harry Hallenberger, Hal Mohr	US
Radio Ructions (SF camera) **[View]**	Halas and Batchelor, JWT	1947	Animation	Commercial		Eng
The Royal Wedding	Gaumont-British, General Film Distributors	1947	Documentary	Featurette		Eng
The Secret Life of Walter Mitty	The Samuel Goldwyn Company, RKO Radio Pictures	1947	Comedy, Fantasy, Romance	Feature	Lee Garmes	US
The Shocking Miss Pilgrim	20th Century-Fox	1947	Comedy, Musical, Romance	Feature	Leon Shamroy	US
The Silver Lining **[View]**	Signal Films, National Screen Service	1947	Puppet animation	Commercial		Eng
Sinbad the Sailor	RKO Radio Pictures	1947	Adventure, Fantasy, Romance	Feature	George Barnes	US
Slave Girl	Universal-International	1947	Action, Adventure, Comedy, Romance, Thriller	Feature	W. Howard Greene, George Robinson	US
Song of Scheherazade	Universal-International	1947	Adventure, Biography, Drama, Musical	Feature	Hal Mohr, William V. Skall	US
This Time for Keeps	Metro-Goldwyn-Mayer	1947	Musical	Feature	Karl Freund	US
Thunder in the Valley	20th Century-Fox	1947	Drama	Feature	Charles G. Clarke	US
Thunderbolt (16mm Kodachrome Original)	Carl Krueger Productions, Inc., U.S. War Department, Monogram Pictures	1947	Documentary	Feature		US
Tycoon	RKO Radio Pictures	1947	Romance, Adventure, Drama	Feature	W. Howard Greene, Harry J. Wild	US
Unconquered	Paramount Pictures	1947	Adventure, Drama, History, Romance, Western	Feature	Ray Rennahan	US
The Unfinished Dance	Metro-Goldwyn-Mayer	1947	Comedy, Drama	Feature	Robert Surtees	US
Variety Girl	Paramount Pictures	1947	Musical, Comedy	'Puppetoon' segment	Lionel Lindon, Stuart Thompson	US
Apartment for Peggy	20th Century-Fox	1948	Drama	Feature	Harry Jackson	US
Black Bart	Universal-International	1948	Western	Feature	Irving Glassberg	US
Bonnie Prince Charlie	London Films, British Lion	1948	Biography, Drama, History, War	Feature	Robert Krasker	Eng
The Boy with Green Hair	RKO Radio Pictures	1948	Comedy, Drama, Family	Feature	George Barnes	US
A Date with Judy	Metro-Goldwyn-Mayer	1948	Comedy, Musical	Feature	Robert Surtees	US
Charley in New Town (SF Camera) **[View]**	Halas and Batchelor, Central Office of Information	1948	Animation	Information		Eng
Easter Parade	Metro-Goldwyn-Mayer	1948	Musical, Romance	Feature	Harry Stradling Sr.	US
Elizabeth of Ladymead	Imperadio Pictures, British Lion	1948	Drama	Feature	Mutz Greenbaum (as Max Greene)	Eng
The Emperor Waltz	Paramount Pictures	1948	Comedy, Musical	Feature	George Barnes	US
Fighter Squadron	Warner Bros.	1948	Action, War	Feature	Wilfrid M. Cline, Sydney Hickox	US
Give My Regards to Broadway	20th Century-Fox	1948	Musical	Feature	Harry Jackson	US
Green Grass of Wyoming	20th Century-Fox	1948	Drama, Family, Western	Feature	Charles G. Clarke	US
Hills of Home	Metro-Goldwyn-Mayer	1948	Adventure, Family, Drama	Feature	Charles Edgar Schoenbaum	US
Joan of Arc	Sierra Pictures, RKO Radio Pictures	1948	Biography, Drama, History, War	Feature	**Winton C. Hoch**, **William V. Skall**, **Joseph A. Valentine**	US
The Kissing Bandit	Metro-Goldwyn-Mayer	1948	Comedy, Musical, Western	Feature	Robert Surtees	US
The Loves of Carmen	The Beckworth Corporation, Columbia Pictures	1948	Adventure, Drama, Music, Romance	Feature	William E. Snyder	US
Luxury Liner	Metro-Goldwyn-Mayer	1948	Comedy, Musical, Romance	Feature	Robert H. Plank	US
The Man from Colorado	Columbia Pictures	1948	Romance, Western	Feature	William E. Snyder	US
Melody Time (SF camera & three-strip)	Walt Disney Productions, RKO Radio Pictures	1948	Animation, Musical, Anthology	Feature	Winton C. Hoch (live-action three-strip)	US
Mousewife's Choice **[View]**	Signal Films	1948	Stop-motion animation	Commercial		Eng
On an Island with You	Metro-Goldwyn-Mayer	1948	Comedy, Musical, Romance	Feature	Charles Rosher	US
On Sunday Afternoon	Warner Bros.	1948	Musical, Romance	Feature	Wilfrid M. Cline, Sydney Hickox	US
The Paleface	Paramount Pictures	1948	Comedy, Western	Feature	Ray Rennahan	US
The Pirate	Metro-Goldwyn-Mayer	1948	Adventure, Comedy, Musical	Feature	Harry Stradling Sr.	US
Portrait of Jennie	The Selznik Studio/Vanguard Films, Selznick International Releasing	1948	Fantasy	Sequence	Joseph H. August, Lee Garmes	US
Queen o' the Border (Technichrome) **[View]**	Crown Film Unit	1948	Documentary	Short		Eng
The Red Shoes	Archers Film Productions, General Film Distributors	1948	Drama, Music, Romance	Feature	Jack Cardiff	Eng
Relentless	Columbia Pictures	1948	Romance, Western	Feature	Edward Cronjager	US
The Return of October	Columbia Pictures	1948	Comedy	Feature	William E. Snyder	US
River Lady	Universal-International	1948	Action, Drama, Western	Feature	Irving Glassberg	US
Robinson Charley (SF camera) **[View]**	Halas and Batchelor, Central Office of Information	1948	Animation	Information		Eng
Romance on the High Seas	Warner Bros.	1948	Comedy, Musical, Romance	Feature	Elwood Bredell	US
Rope	Transatlantic Pictures, Warner Bros.	1948	Crime, Drama, Film-Noir, Thriller	Feature	William V. Skall, Joseph A. Valentine	US
Saraband for Dead Lovers aka Saraband (US)	Ealing Studios, General Film Distributors	1948	Biography, Drama, History, Romance, War	Feature	Douglas Slocombe	Eng
Scott of the Antarctic (Part Monopack)	Ealing Studios, General Film Distributors	1948	Action, Adventure, Biography, Drama	Feature	Osmond Borradaile, Jack Cardiff, Geoffrey Unsworth	Eng
Scudda Hoo! Scudda Hay!	20th Century-Fox	1948	Comedy, Drama, Romance	Feature	Ernest Palmer	US
The Secret Land (16mm Kodachrome original)	Metro-Goldwyn-Mayer	1948	Documentary	Feature		US
A Song is Born	The Samuel Goldwyn Company, RKO Radio Pictures	1948	Comedy, Musical	Feature	Gregg Toland	US
Summer Holiday	Metro-Goldwyn-Mayer	1948	Musical	Feature	Charles Edgar Schoenbaum	US
The Swordsman	Columbia Pictures	1948	Adventure	Feature	William E. Snyder	US
Tap Roots	Walter Wanger Pictures, Universal-International	1948	Drama, War, Western	Feature	Lionel Lindon, Winton C. Hoch	US
That Lady in Ermine	20th Century-Fox	1948	Comedy, Fantasy, Musical, Romance	Feature	Leon Shamroy	US
Three Daring Daughters	Metro-Goldwyn-Mayer	1948	Drama, Musical, Romance	Feature	Ray June	US
3 Godfathers	Metro-Goldwyn-Mayer	1948	Drama, Western	Feature	Winton C. Hoch	US
The Three Musketeers	Metro-Goldwyn-Mayer	1948	Action, Adventure, Drama, Romance	Feature	Robert H. Planck	US
Two Guys from Texas	Warner Bros.	1948	Comedy, Musical, Western	Feature	Arthur Edeson, William V. Skall	US
When My Baby Smiles at Me	20th Century-Fox	1948	Musical	Feature	Harry Jackson	US
Willie Does His Stuff (SF camera) **[View]**	Pinschewer Film	1948	Animation	Commercial		Eng
Words and Music	Metro-Goldwyn-Mayer	1948	Biography, Comedy, Musical	Feature	Charles Rosher, Harry Stradling Sr.	US
XIVth Olympiad: The Glory of Sport (Part Technichrome, part Monopack, part three-strip) **[View]**	Olympic Games (1948) Film Company, General Film Distributors	1948	Documentary	Feature	Stanley W. Sayer	Eng
Your Very Good Health (SF camera) **[View]**	Halas and Batchelor, Central Office of Information	1948	Animation	Information		Eng
Adventures of Don Juan	Warner Bros.	1949	Action, Adventure, Romance	Feature	Elwood Bredell	US
The Adventures of Ichabod and Mr. Toad (SF camera)	Walt Disney Productions, RKO Radio Pictures	1949	Animation, Anthology	Feature		US
Así es Madrid (Spanish, Technichrome)	No-Do	1949	Documentary	Short	Stanley W. Sayer	Eng
Bagdad	Universal-International	1949	Action, Adventure, Fantasy, Musical, Romance	Feature	Russell Metty	US
The Barkleys of Broadway	Metro-Goldwyn-Mayer	1949	Comedy, Musical	Feature	Harry Stradling Sr.	US
The Beautiful Blonde from Bashful Bend	20th Century-Fox	1949	Comedy, Western	Feature	Harry Jackson	US
The Big Cat	William Moss Pictures, Inc, Eagle-Lion Films	1949	Action, Adventure, Drama, Romance, Western	Feature	W. Howard Greene	US
The Blue Lagoon	Individual Pictures, General Film Distributors	1949	Adventure, Drama, Romance	Feature	Geoffrey Unsworth	Eng
Calamity Jane and Sam Bass	Universal-International	1949	Western	Feature	Irving Glassberg	US
Change for the Better **[View]**	Signal Films	1949	Puppet animation	Commercial		Eng
Charley's Black Magic (SF camera) **[View]**	Halas and Batchelor, Central Office of Information	1949	Animation	Information		Eng
Christopher Columbus	Gainsborough Pictures, General Film Distributors	1949	Action, Adventure, Biography, Drama, History	Feature	Stephen Dade	Eng
Clock-wise or a Good Start for the Day (SF camera) **[View]**	Geoffrey & Mina Johnson	1949	Animation	Commercial		Eng
A Connecticut Yankee in King Arthur's Court	Paramount Pictures	1949	Comedy, Family, Fantasy, Musical	Feature	Ray Rennahan	US
Dancing in the Dark	20th Century-Fox	1949	Comedy, Musical, Romance	Feature	Harry Jackson	US
En Sevilla hay una feria (Spanish, Technichrome)	No-Do	1949	Documentary	Short	Stanley W. Sayer	Eng
I fratelli Dinamite aka The Dynamite Brothers (SF camera)	Pagot Film	1949	Animation, Comedy	Feature		Eng
The Gal Who Took the West	Universal-International	1949	Comedy, Western	Feature	William H. Daniels	US
In the Good Old Summertime	Metro-Goldwyn-Mayer	1949	Comedy, Musical, Romance	Feature	Harry Stradling Sr.	US
The Inspector General	Warner Bros.	1949	Comedy, Musical, Romance	Feature	Elwood Bredell	US
It's a Great Feeling	Warner Bros.	1949	Comedy, Musical	Feature	Wilfrid M. Cline	US
Jolson Sings Again	Columbia Pictures	1949	Biography, Musical	Feature	William E. Snyder	US
Little Women	Metro-Goldwyn-Mayer	1949	Drama, Family, Romance	Feature	Robert H. Planck, Charles Edgar Schoenbaum	US
Look for the Silver Lining	Warner Bros.	1949	Drama, Musical, Romance	Feature	J. Peverell Marley	US
Maytime in Mayfair	Imperadio Pictures, British Lion	1949	Musical, Romance	Feature	Mutz Greenbaum (as Max Greene)	Eng
Mother Is a Freshman	20th Century-Fox	1949	Comedy	Feature	Arthur E. Arling	US
My Dream is Yours	Warner Bros.	1949	Comedy, Musical	Feature	Wilfrid M. Cline, Ernest Haller	US
Neptune's Daughter	Metro-Goldwyn-Mayer	1949	Comedy, Musical, Romance, Sport	Feature	Charles Rosher	US
Oh You Beautiful Doll	20th Century-Fox	1949	Biography, Musical	Feature	Harry Jackson	US
On the Town	Metro-Goldwyn-Mayer	1949	Comedy, Musical, Romance	Feature	Harold Rosson	US
Red Canyon	Universal-International	1949	Western	Feature	Irving Glassberg	US
The Red Pony	Lewis Milestone Productions, Republic Pictures	1949	Drama, Family, Western	Feature	Tony Gaudio	US
La Rosa di Bagdad aka The Singing Princess (dubbed, 1952) (SF camera)	Ima Film	1949	Animation	Feature		Eng
Samson and Delilah	Paramount Pictures	1949	Adventure, Drama, History, Romance	Feature	George Barnes, Dewey Wrigley	US
Sand	20th Century-Fox	1949	Western	Feature	Charles G. Clarke	US
The Secret Garden	Metro-Goldwyn-Mayer	1949	Drama, Family	Sequences	Ray June	US
She Wore a Yellow Ribbon	Argosy Pictures, RKO Radio Pictures	1949	Western	Feature	**Winton C. Hoch**	US
Snowdonia **[View]**	Inspiration Films, British Council	1949	Documentary	Short	Cyril Knowles	Eng
So Dear to My Heart (SF Camera, three-strip)	Walt Disney Productions, RKO Radio Pictures	1949	Animation, Drama, Family, Musical	Feature	Winton C. Hoch (live-action)	US
Some of the Best	Metro-Goldwyn-Mayer	1949	Documentary	Short		US
South of St. Louis	Warner Bros.	1949	Western	Feature	Karl Freund	US
The Story of Seabiscuit	Warner Bros.	1949	Drama, Family, Romance	Feature	Wilfrid M. Cline	US
Streets of Laredo	Paramount Pictures	1949	Western	Feature	Ray Rennahan	US
The Sun Comes Up	Metro-Goldwyn-Mayer	1949	Drama, Family	Feature	Ray June	US
Take Me Out to the Ball Game	Metro-Goldwyn-Mayer	1949	Comedy, Musical, Romance, Sport	Feature	George J. Folsey	US
Tale of the Navajos	Metro-Goldwyn-Mayer	1949	Documentary	Feature		US
Task Force	Warner Bros.	1949	Drama, War	Sequences	Robert Burks, Wilfrid M. Cline	US
That Forsyte Woman aka The Forsyte Saga (UK)	Metro-Goldwyn-Mayer	1949	Drama, Romance	Feature	Joseph Ruttenberg	US
That Midnight Kiss	Metro-Goldwyn-Mayer	1949	Musical, Romance	Feature	Robert Surtees	US
Trottie True aka The Gay Lady (US)	Two Cities Films, General Film Distributors	1949	Comedy, Musical, Romance	Feature	Harry Waxman	Eng
Tulsa	Walter Wanger Film Productions, Eagle-Lion Films	1949	Action, Drama, Romance, Western	Feature	Winton C. Hoch	US
Under Capricorn	Transatlantic Pictures, Warner Bros.	1949	Crime, Drama, Romance	Feature	Jack Cardiff	Eng
Yes Sir, That's My Baby	Universal-International	1949	Comedy, Musical, Sport	Feature	Irving Glassberg	US
You're My Everything	20th Century-Fox	1949	Comedy, Musical	Feature	Arthur E. Arling	US
The Younger Brothers	Warner Bros.	1949	Western	Feature	William E. Snyder	US
American Guerrilla in the Philippines	20th Century-Fox	1950	Drama, War	Feature	Harry Jackson	US
Annie Get Your Gun	Metro-Goldwyn-Mayer	1950	Biography, Comedy, Musical, Romance, Western	Feature	Charlie Rosher	US
Barricade	Warner Bros.	1950	Romance, Western	Feature	Carl E. Guthrie	US
The Black Rose	20th Century-Fox	1950	Adventure, History, Romance, War	Feature	Jack Cardiff	Eng
Branded	Paramount Pictures	1950	Crime, Western	Feature	Charles Lang	US
Broken Arrow	20th Century-Fox	1950	Drama, Romance, Western	Feature	Ernest Palmer	US
Buccaneer's Girl	Universal-International	1950	Action, Adventure, Comedy, Musical, Romance	Feature	Russell Metty	US
Challenge to Lassie	Metro-Goldwyn-Mayer	1950	Drama, Family	Feature	Charles Edgar Schoenbaum	US
Cheaper by the Dozen	20th Century-Fox	1950	Comedy, Drama, Family	Feature	Leon Shamroy	US
Cinderella (SF camera)	Walt Disney Productions, RKO Radio Pictures	1950	Animation, Fantasy, Musical, Romance	Feature		US
Colt .45	Warner Bros	1950	Western	Feature	Wilfrid M. Cline	US
Comanche Territory	Universal-International	1950	Adventure, Romance, Western	Feature	Maury Gertsman	US
Copper Canyon	Paramount Pictures	1950	Western	Feature	Charles Lang	US
Curtain Call at Cactus Creek	Universal-International	1950	Comedy, Romance, Western	Feature	Russell Metty	US
Dallas	Warner Bros.	1950	Romance, Western	Feature	Ernest Haller	US
The Dancing Years	Associated British Picture Corporation, Associated British-Pathé	1950	Musical	Feature	Stephen Dade	Eng
The Daughter of Rosie O'Grady	Warner Bros.	1950	Comedy, Musical	Feature	Wilfrid M. Cline	US
The Desert Hawk	Paramount Pictures	1950	Action, Adventure	Feature	Russell Metty	US
Destination Moon	George Pal Productions, Eagle-Lion Films	1950	Adventure, Drama, Sci-Fi	Feature	Lionel Lindon	US
Duchess of Idaho	Metro-Goldwyn-Mayer	1950	Comedy, Musical, Romance	Feature	Charles Edgar Schoenbaum	US
The Eagle and the Hawk	Paramount Pictures	1950	Western	Feature	James Wong Howe	US
The Elusive Pimpernel aka The Fighting Pimpernel	The Archers, London Films, British Lion	1950	Adventure, Drama, Romance	Feature	Christopher Challis	Eng
Fancy Pants	Paramount Pictures	1950	Comedy, Musical, Western	Feature	Charles Lang	US
The Flame and the Arrow	Warner Bros.	1950	Adventure, Romance	Feature	Ernest Haller	US
Frenchie	Universal-International	1950	Romance, Western	Feature	Maury Gertsman	US
Gone to Earth (Also released with changes as The Wild Heart, US, 1952)	The Archers, London Films, British Lion	1950	Drama	Feature	Christopher Challis	Eng
The Happy Years	Metro-Goldwyn-Mayer	1950	Comedy, Romance, Sport	Feature	Paul Vogel	US
High Lonesome	Le May-Templeton Pictures, Eagle-Lion Films	1950	Western	Feature	W. Howard Greene	US
I'll Get By	20th Century-Fox	1950	Comedy, Musical, Romance	Feature	Charles G. Clarke	US
Johnny the Giant Killer (SF camera) (French)	Jean Image Films	1950	Animation	Feature		Eng
Kansas Raiders	Universal-International	1950	Western	Feature	Irving Glassberg	US
The Kid from Texas	Universal-International	1950	Western	Feature	Charles Van Enger	US
Kim	Metro-Goldwyn-Mayer	1950	Adventure, Drama, Family, History	Feature	William V. Skall	US
King Solomon's Mines (Part Monopack)	Metro-Goldwyn-Mayer	1950	Adventure, Romance, Action	Feature	**Robert Surtees**	US
Let's Dance	Paramount Pictures	1950	Comedy, Drama, Musical, Romance	Feature	George Barnes	US
Montana	Warner Bros.	1950	Western	Feature	Karl Freund	US
My Blue Heaven	20th Century-Fox	1950	Drama, Musical	Feature	Arthur E. Arling	US
Nancy Goes to Rio	Metro-Goldwyn-Mayer	1950	Comedy, Musical	Feature	Ray June	US
The Outriders	Metro-Goldwyn-Mayer	1950	Romance, Western	Feature	Charles Edgar Schoenbaum	US
Pagan Love Song	Metro-Goldwyn-Mayer	1950	Musical, Romance	Feature	Charles Rosher	US
Paris aka Paris on the Seine **[View]**	Byron Film	1950	Travelogue	Short	Jack Cardiff, Geoffrey Unsworth	Eng
The Palomino	Columbia Pictures	1950	Western	Feature	Vincent J. Farrar	US
Peggy	Universal-International	1950	Comedy	Feature	Russell Metty	US
The Petty Girl	Columbia Pictures	1950	Biography, Comedy	Feature	William E. Snyder	US
Return of the Frontiersman	Warner Bros.	1950	Western	Feature	J. Peverell Marley	US
Rogues of Sherwood Forest	Columbia Pictures	1950	Adventure, History, Romance	Feature	Charles Lawton Jr.	US
Saddle Tramp	Universal-International	1950	Western	Feature	Charles P. Boyle	US
Sierra	Universal-International	1950	Western	Feature	Russell Metty	US
The Story of Time (SF Camera) **[View]**	Signal Films, JWT	1950	Stop-motion animation	Commercial		Eng
Summer Stock	Metro-Goldwyn-Mayer	1950	Musical, Romance	Feature	Robert H. Planck	US
The Sundowners aka Thunder in the Dust (UK)	Le May-Templeton Pictures, Eagle-Lion Films	1950	Action, Adventure, History, Romance, Western	Feature	Winton C. Hoch	US
Tea for Two	Warner Bros.	1950	Comedy, Musical, Romance	Feature	Wilfrid M. Cline	US
Three Little Words	Metro-Goldwyn-Mayer	1950	Biography, Comedy, Musical, Romance	Feature	Harry Jackson	US
A Ticket to Tomahawk	20th Century-Fox	1950	Comedy, Music, Western	Feature	Harry Jackson	US
The Toast of New Orleans	Metro-Goldwyn-Mayer	1950	Musical	Feature	William E. Snyder	US
Treasure Island	Walt Disney British Productions, RKO Radio Pictures	1950	Adventure, Family	Feature	Freddie Young	Eng
Tripoli	Pine-Thomas Productions, Paramount Pictures	1950	Action, Adventure, History, Romance, War	Feature	James Wong Howe	US
Two Weeks with Love	Metro-Goldwyn-Mayer	1950	Comedy, Musical, Romance	Feature	Alfred Gilks	US
Wabash Avenue	20th Century-Fox	1950	Musical	Feature	Arthur E. Arling	US
The White Tower	RKO Radio Pictures	1950	Adventure	Feature	Ray Rennahan	US
Wyoming Mail	Universal-International	1950	Western	Feature	Russell Metty	US
Across the Wide Missouri	Metro-Goldwyn-Mayer	1951	Adventure, Romance, Western	Feature	William C. Mellor	US
The African Queen	Romulus Films, Horizon Pictures, Independent Film Producers (UK) United Artists (US)	1951	Adventure, Drama, Romance War	Feature	Jack Cardiff	Eng
Al Jennings of Oklahoma	Columbia Pictures	1951	Action, Romance, Western	Feature	W. Howard Greene	US
Alice in Wonderland (SF camera)	Walt Disney Productions, RKO Radio Pictures	1951	Animation, Fantasy	Feature		US
An American in Paris	Metro-Goldwyn-Mayer	1951	Drama, Musical, Romance	Feature	**John Alton**, **Alfred Gilks**	US
Anne of the Indies	20th Century-Fox	1951	Action, Adventure, Drama, Romance	Feature	Harry Jackson	US
Apache Drums	Universal-International	1951	Western	Feature	Charles P. Boyle	US
Balance 1950 (SF camera) **[View]**	Larkin Studio	1951	Animation	Short		Eng
Best of the Badmen	RKO Radio Pictures	1951	Western	Feature	Edward Cronjager	US
Bird of Paradise	20th Century-Fox	1951	Adventure, Drama, Romance	Feature	Winton C. Hoch	US
Call Me Mister	20th Century-Fox	1951	Musical	Feature	Arthur E. Arling	US
Captain Horatio Hornblower (RN)	Warner Bros.	1951	Action, Adventure, Drama, War	Feature	Guy Green	Eng
Cattle Drive	Universal-International	1951	Action, Western	Feature	Maury Gertsman	US
Cave of Outlaws	Universal-International	1951	Adventure, Western	Feature	Irving Glassberg	US
The Cimarron Kid	Universal-International	1951	Western	Feature	Charles P. Boyle	US
Crosswinds	Paramount Pictures	1951	Adventure, Crime, Thriller	Feature	Loyal Griggs	US
David and Bathsheba	20th Century-Fox	1951	Drama, History, Romance	Feature	Leon Shamroy	US
Distant Drums	Warner Bros.	1951	Action, Drama, Romance, Western	Feature	Sydney Hickox	US
The Distant Thames aka Royal River **[View]**	International Realist, British Film Institute	1951	Documentary	3D Short	Stanley W. Sayer	Eng
Double Crossbones	Universal-International	1951	Adventure, Comedy, History, Musical	Feature	Maury Gertsman	US
Excuse My Dust	Metro-Goldwyn-Mayer	1951	Comedy, Musical	Feature	Alfred Gilks	US
Flame of Araby	Universal-International	1951	Adventure	Feature	Russell Metty	US
Flaming Feather	Paramount Pictures	1951	Western	Feature	Ray Rennahan	US
Flu-ing Squad (SF camera) **[View]**	Halas and Batchelor, Pressbury Film Productions	1951	Animation	Commercial		Eng
Flying Leathernecks	RKO Radio Pictures	1951	Drama, War, Action	Feature	William E. Snyder	US
Fort Worth	Warner Bros.	1951	Western	Feature	Sydney Hickox	US
Golden Girl	20th Century-Fox	1951	Drama, Musical	Feature	Charles G. Clarke	US
The Golden Horde	Universal-International	1951	Action, Adventure	Feature	Russell Metty	US
The Great Caruso	Metro-Goldwyn-Mayer	1951	Biography, Drama, Musical	Feature	Joseph Ruttenberg	US
The Great Missouri Raid	Paramount Pictures	1951	Western	Feature	Ray Rennahan	US
Half Angel	20th Century-Fox	1951	Comedy	Feature	Milton Krasner	US
Halls of Montezuma	20th Century-Fox	1951	Action, Adventure, Drama, War	Feature	Winton C. Hoch, Harry Jackson	US
Happy Go Lovely	Excelsior Films, Associated British-Pathé (UK), RKO Radio Pictures(US)	1951	Comedy, Musical, Romance	Feature	Erwin Hillier	Eng
The House in the Square aka I'll Never Forget You (part B&W)	20th Century-Fox	1951	Drama, Fantasy, Romance	Feature	Georges Périnal	Eng
I'd Climb the Highest Mountain	20th Century-Fox	1951	Biography, Drama, Romance	Feature	Edward Cronjager	US
Lady from Texas	Universal-International	1951	Comedy, Western	Feature	Charles P. Boyle	US
The Last Outpost aka Cavalry Charge	Pine-Thomas Productions, Paramount Pictures	1951	Western	Feature	Loyal Griggs	US
Little Egypt	Universal-International	1951	Comedy, Drama	Feature	Russell Metty	US
Lorna Doone	Columbia Pictures	1951	Drama, Romance	Feature	Charles Van Enger	US
Lullaby of Broadway	Warner Bros.	1951	Comedy, Musical, Romance	Feature	Wilfrid M. Cline	US
The Magic Box	Festival Film Productions, British Lion	1951	Biography, Drama	Feature	Jack Cardiff	Eng
The Man in the Saddle	Columbia Pictures	1951	Romance, Western	Feature	Charles Lawton Jr.	US
The Mark of the Renegade	Universal-International	1951	Adventure	Feature	Charles P. Boyle	US
Mask of the Avenger	Columbia Pictures	1951	Adventure, Drama, History, Romance	Feature	Charles Lawton Jr.	US
Meet Me After the Show	20th Century-Fox	1951	Comedy, Musical	Feature	Arthur E. Arling, Mala	US
Mr. Imperium	Metro-Goldwyn-Mayer	1951	Drama, Musical, Romance	Feature	George J. Folsey	US
On Moonlight Bay	Warner Bros.	1951	Comedy, Musical, Romance	Feature	Ernest Haller	US
On the Riviera	20th Century-Fox	1951	Comedy, Musical	Feature	Leon Shamroy	US
The Painted Hills	Metro-Goldwyn-Mayer	1951	Family, Western	Feature	Alfred Gilks, Harold Lipstein	US
Painting the Clouds with Sunshine	Warner Bros.	1951	Musical	Feature	Wilfrid M. Cline	US
Pandora and the Flying Dutchman	Romulus Films, International Film Distributors	1951	Drama, Fantasy, Mystery, Romance	Feature	Jack Cardiff	Eng
Passage West	Paramount Pictures	1951	Western	Feature	Loyal Griggs	US
The Prince Who Was a Thief	Universal-International	1951	Adventure	Feature	Irving Glassberg	US
Quebec	Paramount Pictures	1951	Adventure, History	Feature	W. Howard Greene	US
Quo Vadis	Metro-Goldwyn-Mayer	1951	Biography, Drama, History, Romance	Feature	William V. Skall, Robert Surtees	US/Eng
Red Mountain	Paramount Pictures	1951	Drama, Western	Feature	Charles Lang	US
Rich, Young and Pretty	Metro-Goldwyn-Mayer	1951	Comedy, Musical, Romance	Feature	Robert H. Planck	US
The River	Oriental International Films, United Artists	1951	Drama, Romance	Feature	Claude Renoir	Eng
Royal Wedding	Metro-Goldwyn-Mayer	1951	Comedy, Musical, Romance	Feature	Robert H. Planck	US
Santa Fe	Columbia Pictures	1951	Western	Feature	Charles Lawton Jr.	US
Show Boat	Metro-Goldwyn-Mayer	1951	Drama, Family, Musical, Romance	Feature	Charles Rosher	US
Silver City aka High Vermillion (UK)	Paramount Pictures	1951	Western	Feature	Ray Rennahan	US
Smuggler's Island	Universal-International	1951	Adventure, Crime, Drama, Romance	Feature	Maury Gertsman	US
Stage to Tucson	Columbia Pictures	1951	Western	Feature	Charles Lawton Jr.	US
Sugarfoot	Warner Bros.	1951	Western, Action, Romance	Feature	Wilfrid M. Cline	US
Take Care of My Little Girl	20th Century-Fox	1951	Drama	Feature	Harry Jackson	US
The Tales of Hoffmann	The Archers, London Films, British Lion	1951	Fantasy, Musical, Romance	Feature	Christopher Challis	Eng
Ten Tall Men	Columbia Pictures	1951	Action, Adventure	Feature	William E. Snyder	US
Texas Carnival	Metro-Goldwyn-Mayer	1951	Comedy, Musical, Romance	Feature	Robert H. Planck	US
Tomahawk	Universal-International	1951	History, Romance, Western	Feature	Charles P. Boyle	US
Two Tickets to Broadway	RKO Radio Pictures	1951	Musical, Romance	Feature	Edward Cronjager, Harry J. Wild	US
Valentino	Columbia Pictures	1951	Drama	Feature	Harry Stradling Sr.	US
Vengeance Valley	Metro-Goldwyn-Mayer	1951	Western	Feature	George J. Folsey	US
Warpath	Paramount Pictures	1951	Western	Feature	Ray Rennahan	US
West of England **[View]**	Greenpark Productions, United Artists	1951	Documentary	Short	Roland Stafford	Eng
When Worlds Collide	Paramount Pictures	1951	Action, Sci-Fi, Thriller	Feature	W. Howard Greene, John F. Seitz	US
Where No Vultures Fly aka Ivory Hunter (US)	Ealing Studios, African Film Productions, General Film Distributors	1951	Drama, Adventure	Feature	Paul Beeson, Geoffrey Unsworth	Eng
Aan (India) aka The Savage Princess (UK & US) 16mm Kodachrome original (Note: Most listings state that this title was filmed in 16mm Gevacolor. However, according to Technicolor News & Views (December 1952), the film was filmed in Kodachrome, the distribution prints being produced by Technicolor in London. Gevacolor was not available in India until 1952 – filming having begun in 1948.)	Mehboob Productions	1952	Bollywood adventure	Feature	Faredoon A. Irani	Eng
Aaron Slick from Punkin Crick	Paramount Pictures	1952	Musical	Feature	Charles Lang	US
About Face	Warner Bros.	1952	Comedy, Musical, Romance, Sport	Feature	Bert Glenson	US
Against All Flags	Universal-International	1952	Action, Adventure, Drama, Romance	Feature	Russell Metty	US
April in Paris	Warner Bros.	1952	Musical, Romance	Feature	Wilfrid M. Cline	US
At Swords Point aka Sons of the Three Musketeers (UK)	RKO Radio Pictures	1952	Adventure, History	Feature	Ray Rennahan	US
The Battle at Apache Pass	Universal-International	1952	Western	Feature	Charles P. Boyle	US
Because You're Mine	Metro-Goldwyn-Mayer	1952	Comedy, Musical	Feature	Joseph Ruttenberg	US
The Belle of New York	Metro-Goldwyn-Mayer	1952	Comedy, Musical, Romance	Feature	Robert H. Planck	US
Belles on Their Toes	20th Century-Fox	1952	Comedy	Feature	Arthur E. Lang	US
Bend of the River aka Where the River Bends (UK)	Universal-International	1952	Action, Adventure, Romance, Western	Feature	Irving Glassberg	US
The Big Trees	Warner Bros.	1952	Action, Romance, Western	Feature	Bert Glennon	US
Blackbeard the Pirate	RKO Radio Pictures	1952	Adventure	Feature	William E. Snyder	US
The Blazing Forest	Pine-Thomas Productions, Paramount Pictures	1952	Action, Adventure, Mystery, Romance	Feature	Lionel Lindon	US
Bloodhounds of Broadway	20th Century-Fox	1952	Comedy, Musical	Feature	Edward Cronjager	US
Brave Warrior	Columbia Pictures	1952	Western	Feature	William V. Skall	US
The Brigand	Columbia Pictures	1952	Adventure, Romance	Feature	W. Howard Greene	US
Bronco Buster	Universal-International	1952	Western	Feature	Clifford Stine	US
Bugles in the Afternoon	Warner Bros.	1952	Romance, Western	Feature	Wilfrid M. Cline	US
California Conquest	Columbia Pictures	1952	Adventure, History, Romance, Western	Feature	Ellis W. Carter	US
Captain Pirate	Columbia Pictures	1952	Action, Adventure, Romance	Feature	Charles Lawton Jr.	US
Caribbean	Pine-Thomas Productions, Paramount Pictures	1952	Action, Adventure, Romance	Feature	Lionel Lindon	US
The Crimson Pirate	Norma Productions, Warner Bros.	1952	Action, Adventure, Comedy, Drama	Feature	Otto Heller	Eng
Cripple Creek	Columbia Pictures	1952	Western	Feature	William V. Skall	US
Denver and Rio Grande	Paramount Pictures	1952	Adventure, Western	Feature	Ray Rennahan	US
Domestic Help **[View]**	Holdsworth Productions	1952		Commercial		Eng
The Duel at Silver Creek	Universal-International	1952	Western	Feature	Irving Glassberg	US
Everything I Have Is Yours	Metro-Goldwyn-Mayer	1952	Musical	Feature	William V. Skall	US
Father's Doing Fine	Marble Arch Films, ABPC, Associated British-Pathé	1952	Comedy	Feature	Irwin Hillier	Eng
The Golden Coach (French)	Delphinus, Hoche Production, Panaria Film	1952	Comedy	Feature	Claude Renoir	Eng
The Golden Hawk	Columbia Pictures	1952	Action, Adventure, Romance, War	Feature	William V. Skall	US
The Greatest Show on Earth	Paramount Pictures	1952	Drama, Family, Romance	Feature	George Barnes	US
The Half-Breed	RKO Radio Pictures	1952	Western	Feature	William V. Skall	US
Hangman's Knot	Columbia Pictures	1952	Romance, Western	Feature	Charles Lawton Jr.	US
Hans Christian Andersen	Samuel Goldwyn Company, RKO Radio Pictures	1952	Biography, Family, Musical, Romance	Feature	Harry Stradling Sr.	US
Has Anybody Seen My Gal	Universal-International	1952	Comedy	Feature	Clifford Stine	US
Hong Kong	Pine-Thomas Productions, Paramount Pictures	1952	Adventure, Comedy, Drama, Thriller, War	Feature	Lionel Lindon	US
Horizons West	Universal-International	1952	Western	Feature	Charles P. Boyle	US
Hurricane Smith	Nat Holt Productions, Paramount Pictures	1952	Action, Adventure, Romance	Feature	Ray Rennahan	US
The Importance of Being Earnest	Javelin Films, General Film Distributors	1952	Comedy, Drama	Feature	Desmond Dickinson	Eng
The Iron Mistress	Warner Bros.	1952	Action, Adventure, Biography, Drama, History, Western	Feature	John F. Seitz	US
It Started in Paradise	British Film Makers, General Film Distributors	1952	Drama	Feature	Jack Cardiff	Eng
Ivanhoe	Metro-Goldwyn-Mayer	1952	Adventure, Drama, History, Romance	Feature	Freddie Young	Eng
The Jazz Singer	Warner Bros.	1952	Drama, Musical	Feature	Carl E. Guthrie	US
Just for You	Paramount Pictures	1952	Comedy, Drama, Musical, Romance	Feature	George Barnes	US
Kangaroo	20th Century-Fox	1952	Adventure, Drama, Western	Feature	Charles G. Clarke	US
Lovely to Look At	Metro-Goldwyn-Mayer	1952	Comedy, Musical, Romance	Feature	George J. Folsey	US
Lure of the Wilderness	20th Century-Fox	1952	Adventure, Drama, Romance, Western	Feature	Edward Cronjager	US
Lydia Bailey	20th Century-Fox	1952	Action, Adventure, History, Romance, War	Feature	Harry Jackson	US
Made in Heaven	Fanfare Films, General Film Distributors	1952	Comedy	Feature	Geoffrey Unsworth	Eng
Meet Me Tonight aka Tonight at 8:30 (US)	British Film Makers, General Film Distributors	1952	Comedy, Anthology film	Feature	Desmond Dickinson	Eng
The Merry Widow	Metro-Goldwyn-Mayer	1952	Musical	Feature	Robert Surtees	US
Million Dollar Mermaid	Metro-Goldwyn-Mayer	1952	Biography, Drama, Musical, Sport	Feature	George J. Folsey	US
Monsoon	Film Group (Forrest Judd), Grand National Pictures (UK) United Artists (US)	1952	Drama, Romance	Feature	Ernest Haller	Eng
Montana Territory	Columbia Pictures	1952	Western	Feature	Henry Freulich	US
Moulin Rouge	Moulin Productions, Romulus Productions, United Artists	1952	Biography, Drama, Music, Romance	Feature	Oswald Morris	Eng
Mutiny	King Brothers Productions, United Artists	1952	Adventure	Feature	Ernest Laszlo	US
Penny Princess	Conquest Productions, General Film Distributors	1952	Comedy, Romance	Feature	Geoffrey Unsworth	Eng
Plymouth Adventure	Metro-Goldwyn-Mayer	1952	Adventure, Drama, History, Romance	Feature	Willian H. Daniels	US
Pony Soldier	20th Century-Fox	1952	Western	Feature	Harry Jackson	US
The Prisoner of Zenda	Metro-Goldwyn-Mayer	1952	Adventure	Feature	Joseph Ruttenberg	US
The Quiet Man	Argosy Pictures, Republic Pictures	1952	Comedy, Drama, Romance	Feature	**Winton C. Hoch**	US
The Raiders	Universal-International	1952	Western	Feature	Carl E. Guthrie	US
Rainbow 'Round My Shoulder	Columbia Pictures	1952	Musical	Feature	Ellis W. Carter	US
Rancho Notorious	Fidelity Pictures, RKO Radio Pictures	1952	Western	Feature	Hal Mohr	US
Red Skies of Montana	20th Century-Fox	1952	Action, Adventure, Drama, Romance	Feature	Charles G. Clarke	US
Road to Bali	Bing Crosby Productions, Hope Enterprises, Paramount Pictures	1952	Comedy, Musical	Feature	George Barnes	US
Saturday Island aka Island of Desire	Coronado Productions (England), RKO Radio Pictures (UK) United Artists (US)	1952	Adventure, Romance, War	Feature	Oswald Morris	Eng
The Savage	Paramount Pictures	1952	Action, Romance, Western	Feature	John F. Seitz	US
Scaramouche	Metro-Goldwyn-Mayer	1952	Action, Adventure, Comedy, Drama, Romance	Feature	Charles Rosher	US
Scarlet Angel	Universal-International	1952	Adventure, Drama, Western	Feature	Russell Metty	US
She's Working Her Way Through College	Warner Bros.	1952	Comedy, Musical	Feature	Wilfrid M. Cline	US
Singin' in the Rain	Metro-Goldwyn-Mayer	1952	Comedy, Musical, Romance	Feature	Harold Rosson	US
Skirts Ahoy	Metro-Goldwyn-Mayer	1952	Comedy, Musical	Feature	William C. Mellor	US
The Snows of Kilimanjaro	20th Century-Fox	1952	Adventure, Drama, Romance, War	Feature	Charles G. Clarke, Leon Shamroy	US
Somebody Loves Me	Paramount Pictures	1952	Biography, Musical, Romance	Feature	George Barnes	US
Son of Ali Baba	Universal-International	1952	Adventure, Fantasy, Romance	Feature	Maury Gertsman	US
Son of Paleface	Paramount Pictures	1952	Comedy, Romance, Western	Feature	Harry J. Wild	US
South of Algiers aka The Golden Mask (US)	Mayflower Productions, Associated British Picture Corporation, Associated British Pathé	1952	Adventure, Drama, Romance	Feature	Oswald Morris	Eng
Stars and Stripes Forever	20th Century-Fox	1952	Biography, Comedy, Music	Feature	Charles G. Clarke	US
Steel Town	Universal-International	1952	Drama	Feature	Charles P. Boyle	US
The Story of Robin Hood and His Merrie Men	Walt Disney British Productions, RKO Radio Pictures	1952	Action, Adventure, Family	Feature	Guy Green	Eng
Thief of Damascus	Columbia Pictures	1952	Adventure, Family, Romance	Feature	Ellis W. Carter	US
The Treasure of Lost Canyon	Universal-International	1952	Western, Adventure	Feature	Russell Metty	US
24 Hours of a Woman's Life aka Affair in Monte Carlo (US)	Associated British Picture Corporation, Associated British Pathé	1952	Drama, Romance	Feature	Christopher Challis	Eng
Untamed Frontier	Universal-International	1952	Western	Feature	Charles P. Boyle	US
Wait 'Til the Sun Shines, Nellie	20th Century-Fox	1952	Drama	Feature	Leon Shamroy	US
Way of a Gaucho	20th Century-Fox	1952	Action, Adventure, Romance, Western	Feature	Harry Jackson	US
What Price Glory	20th Century-Fox	1952	Comedy, Drama, Musical, Romance, War	Feature	Joseph MacDoland	US
Where's Charley?	Warner Bros.	1952	Comedy, Musical	Feature	Erwin Hillier	Eng
With a Song in My Heart	20th Century-Fox	1952	Biography, Drama, Musical	Feature	Leon Shamroy	US
The World in His Arms	Universal-International	1952	Action, Adventure, History	Feature	Russell Metty	US
Yankee Buccaneer	Universal-International	1952	Adventure, History, Romance	Feature	Russell Metty	US
All Ashore	Columbia Pictures	1953	Comedy, Musical	Feature	Charles Lawton Jr.	US
Ambush at Tomahawk Gap	Columbia Pictures	1953	Action, Romance, Western	Feature	Henry Freulich	US
Arrowhead	Nat Holt Productions, Paramount Pictures	1953	Western, Action	Feature	Ray Rennahan	US
The Band Wagon	Metro-Goldwyn-Mayer	1953	Comedy, Musical, Romance	Feature	Harry Jackson	US
The Beggar's Opera	Imperadio Pictures, Warner Bros.	1953	Musical, Opera	Feature	Guy Green	Eng
Botany Bay	Paramount Pictures	1953	Adventure, Drama	Feature	John F. Seitz	US
By the Light of the Silvery Moon	Warner Bros.	1953	Comedy, Drama, Musical, Romance	Feature	Wilfrid M. Cline	US
Calamity Jane	Warner Bros.	1953	Comedy, Musical, Romance, Western	Feature	Wilfrid M. Cline	US
Call Me Madam	20th Century-Fox	1953	Musical, Comedy	Feature	Leon Shamroy	US
City Beneath the Sea	Universal-International	1953	Adventure, Drama	Feature	Charles P. Boyle	US
Column South	Universal-International	1953	Western	Feature	Charles P. Boyle	US
Conquest of Cochise	Clover Productions, Columbia Pictures	1953	Western	Feature	Henry Freulich	US
The Conquest of Everest (16mm Kodachrome original) **[View]**	Countryman Films, Group 3 Films, British Lion	1953	Documentary, Adventure	Feature	Thomas Stobart, George Lowe	Eng
Dangerous When Wet	Metro-Goldwyn-Mayer	1953	Musical	Feature	Harold Rosson	US
Un caprice de Caroline chérie aka Caroline Cherie (French)	Cinéphonic, Société Nouvelle des Établissements Gaumont	1953	War, Romance	Feature	André Thomas	Eng
Decameron Nights	Film Locations, Eros Films (UK), RKO Radio Pictures (US)	1953	Anthology, Drama, Romance	Feature	Guy Green	Eng
Desert Legion	Universal-International	1953	Adventure, Romance	Feature	John F. Seitz	US
The Desert Song	Warner Bros.	1953	Musical	Feature	Robert Burks	US
Destination Gobi	20th Century-Fox	1953	Adventure, War	Feature	Charles G. Clarke	US
Down Among the Sheltering Palms	20th Century-Fox	1953	Musical, Comedy	Feature	Leon Shamroy	US
Easy to Love (hybrid film, finale in Ansco Color)	Metro-Goldwyn-Mayer	1953	Musical, Romance	Feature	Ray June	US
The Farmer Takes a Wife	20th Century-Fox	1953	Musical, Comedy, Romance	Feature	Arthur E. Arling	US
The 5,000 Fingers of Dr. T.	Stanley Kramer, Columbia Pictures	1953	Fantasy, Musical	Feature	Franz Planer	US
Flame of Calcutta	Esskay Pictures, Columbia Pictures	1953	Adventure	Feature	Henry Freulich, Ray Cory	US
Flight to Tangier (3D – six-strip)	Nat Holt Productions, Paramount Pictures	1953	Drama	Feature	Ray Rennahan	US
Genevieve	Sirius Productions, General Film Distributors	1953	Comedy	Feature	Christopher Challis	Eng
Gentlemen Prefer Blondes	20th Century-Fox	1953	Comedy, Crime, Musical, Romance	Feature	Harry J. Wild	US
The Girl Next Door	20th Century-Fox	1953	Musical, Comedy	Feature	Leon Shamroy	US
The Girls of Pleasure Island	Paramount Pictures	1953	Drama	Feature	Daniel L. Fapp, W. Howard Greene	US
The Golden Blade	Universal-International	1953	Adventure, Fantasy, Romance	Feature	Maury Gertsman	US
The Great Sioux Uprising	Universal-International	1953	Western	Feature	Maury Gertsman	US
Gun Belt	Global Productions, United Artists	1953	Western	Feature	W. Howard Greene	US
Gunsmoke	Universal-International	1953	Western	Feature	Charles P. Boyle	US
Houdini	Paramount Pictures	1953	Biography, Drama	Feature	Ernest Laszlo	US
The I Don't Care Girl	20th Century-Fox	1953	Musical, Biography	Feature	Arthur E. Arling	US
A Lion is in the Streets	Cagney Productions, Warner Bros.	1953	Drama, Politics	Feature	Harry Stradling Sr.	US
I Love Melvin	Metro-Goldwyn-Mayer	1953	Musical, Comedy	Feature	Harold Rosson	US
Isn't Life Wonderful! aka Uncle Willie's Bicycle Shop (US)	Associated British Picture Corporation, Associated British-Pathé	1953	Comedy	Feature	Irwin Hillier	Eng
Jack McCall, Desperado	Esskay Pictures, Columbia Pictures	1953	Western	Feature	Henry Freulich	US
Jamaica Run	Clarion Productions, Paramount Pictures	1953	Mystery, Adventure	Feature	Lionel Lindon	US
Jhansi Ki Rani aka The Tiger and the Flame (Indian)	All India Film Corporation, Mehboob Productions, Minerva Movietone	1953	Drama, History, Musical	Feature	Ernest Haller	Eng
Laughing Anne	Imperadio Pictures, Republic Pictures	1953	Adventure, Drama, Romance	Feature	Mutz Greenbaum (as Max Greene)	Eng
Law and Order	Universal-International	1953	Western	Feature	Clifford Stine	US
The Lawless Breed	Universal-International	1953	Western	Feature	Irving Glassberg	US
Let’s Do It Again	Columbia Pictures	1953	Musical	Feature	Charles Lawton Jr.	US
The Lone Hand	Universal-International	1953	Western	Feature	Maury Gertsman	US
The Man from the Alamo	Universal-International	1953	Western	Feature	Russell Metty	US
The Man Who Watched Trains Go By aka The Paris Express (US)	Raymond Stross Productions, Eros Films	1953	Drama	Feature	Otto Heller	Eng
The Master of Ballantrae	Warner Bros.	1953	Action, Adventure, History, Romance	Feature	Jack Cardiff	Eng
Meet Me at the Fair	Universal-International	1953	Musical	Feature	Maury Gertsman	US
Melba	Horizon Pictures, United Artists	1953	Biography, Musical, Romance	Feature	Edward Scaife	Eng
Mogambo (part Monopack)	Metro-Goldwyn-Mayer	1953	Adventure, Drama, Romance	Feature	Robert Surtees, Freddie Young	Eng
The Naked Spur	Metro-Goldwyn-Mayer	1953	Thriller, Western	Feature	William C. Mellor	US
Niagara	20th Century-Fox	1953	Film Noir	Feature	Joseph MacDonald	US
The Pathfinder	Esskay Pictures, Columbia Pictures	1953	Western, Drama	Feature	Henry Freulich	US
Peter Pan (SF camera)	Walt Disney Productions, RKO Radio Pictures	1953	Animation, Fantasy, Musical	Feature		US
Pony Express	Paramount Pictures	1953	Western	Feature	Ray Rennahan	US
Powder River	20th Century-Fox	1953	Western	Feature	Edward Cronjager	US
Prince of Pirates	Esskay Pictures, Columbia Pictures	1953	Adventure	Feature	Henry Freulich	US
Puccini (Italian)	Rizzoli Film	1953	Biography, Drama, Musical	Feature	Claude Renoir	Eng
A Queen is Crowned	Rank Organisation, General Film Distributors	1953	Documentary	Feature		Eng
Raiders of the Seven Seas	Global Productions, United Artists	1953	Adventure, Romance	Feature	W. Howard Greene	US
The Red Beret aka Paratrooper (US)	Warwick Films, Columbia Pictures	1953	Adventure, War	Feature	John Wilcox	Eng
The Redhead from Wyoming	Universal-International	1953	Western	Feature	Winton C. Hoch	US
Return to Paradise	Aspen Productions, United Artists	1953	Drama, Adventure	Feature	Winton C. Hoch	US
Rob Roy, the Highland Rogue	Walt Disney British Productions, RKO Radio Pictures	1953	Adventure, History, Romance	Feature	Guy Green	Eng
Saadia	Metro-Goldwyn-Mayer	1953	Adventure, Drama	Feature	Christopher Challis	Eng
Salome	The Beckworth Corporation, Columbia Pictures	1953	Biblical, Drama	Feature	Charles Lang	US
Scandal at Scourie	Metro-Goldwyn-Mayer	1953	Drama	Feature	Robert H. Planck	US
Sea Devils	Coronado Productions (England), RKO Radio Pictures	1953	Adventure, History, Romance	Feature	Wilkie Cooper	Eng
Seminole	Universal-International	1953	Western, History	Feature	Russell Metty	US
Serpent of the Nile	Esskay Pictures, Columbia Pictures	1953	Biography, History	Feature	Henry Freulich	US
Shane	Paramount Pictures	1953	Drama, Romance, Western	Feature	**Loyal Griggs**	US
Siren of Bagdad	Esskay Pictures, Columbia Pictures	1953	Adventure	Feature	Henry Freulich	US
Slaves of Babylon	Clover Productions, Columbia Pictures	1953	Biblical	Feature	Henry Freulich	US
Small Town Girl	Metro-Goldwyn-Mayer	1953	Musical, Comedy, Romance	Feature	Joseph Ruttenberg	US
So This is Love	Warner Bros.	1953	Biography, Musical	Feature	Robert Burks	US
Sombrero	Metro-Goldwyn-Mayer	1953	Musical, Romance	Feature	Ray June	US
The Stars Are Singing	Paramount Pictures	1953	Musical	Feature	Lionel Lindon	US
The Story of Gilbert and Sullivan	London Films, British Lion	1953	Biography, History, Musical	Feature	Christopher Challis	Eng
The Story of Three Loves	Metro-Goldwyn-Mayer	1953	Anthology, Romance	Feature	Charles Rosher, Harold Rosson	US
The Sword and the Rose	Walt Disney British Productions, RKO Radio Pictures	1953	Adventure, History, Romance	Feature	Geoffrey Unsworth	Eng
Take Me to Town	Universal-International	1953	Western, Comedy	Feature	Russell Metty	US
Thunder Bay	Universal-International	1953	Adventure	Feature	William H. Daniels	US
The Titfield Thunderbolt	Ealing Studios, General Film Distributors	1953	Comedy	Feature	Douglas Slocombe	Eng
Tonight We Sing	20th Century-Fox	1953	Biography, Musical	Feature	Leon Shamroy	US
Treasure of the Golden Condor	20th Century-Fox	1953	Adventure, Drama	Feature	Edward Cronjager	US
Tropic Zone	Pine-Thomas Productions, Paramount Pictures	1953	Adventure, Crime, Drama, Romance	Feature	Lionel Lindon	US
The Vanquished	Pine-Thomas Productions, Paramount Pictures	1953	History, Drama	Feature	Lionel Lindon	US
The War of the Worlds	Paramount Pictures	1953	Sci-Fi, Horror	Feature	George Barnes	US
White Witch Doctor	20th Century-Fox	1953	Adventure	Feature	Leon Shamroy	US
Will Any Gentleman...?	Associated British Picture Corporation, Associated British-Pathé	1953	Comedy	Feature	Erwin Hillier	Eng
Young Bess	Metro-Goldwyn-Mayer	1953	Biography, History, Drama, Romance	Feature	Charles Rosher	US
Animal Farm (SF Camera)	Halas and Batchelor, Associated British-Pathé	1954	Animation, Drama, Family	Feature		Eng
Attila (Italian/French)	Compagnie Cinématographique de France, Producciones Ponti-de Laurentis, Lux Film	1954	Biography, History, Drama, War	Feature	Aldo Tonti	Eng
The Barefoot Contessa	Figaro, United Artists	1954	Crime, Drama, Mystery, Romance	Feature	Jack Cardiff	Eng
The Beachcomber	London Independent Producers, General Film Distributors	1954	Comedy, Drama	Feature	Reginald Wyer	Eng
Bengal Brigade	Universal-International	1954	Adventure, War, Drama	Feature	Maury Gertzman	
The Black Knight	Warwick Films, Columbia Pictures	1954	Action, Adventure, History, Romance	Feature	John Wilcox	
The Caine Mutiny	Stanley Kramer Productions, Columbia Pictures	1954	Drama, War	Feature	Franz Planer	US
Casta Diva (French/Italian)	Documento Film, Franco London Films, Le Louvre Film	1954	Biography, Drama	Feature	Marco Scarpelli	Eng
Doctor in the House	Group Film Productions, General Film Distributors	1954	Comedy	Feature	Ernest Steward	Eng
Duel in the Jungle	Marcel Hellman, Associated British Picture Corporation, Associated British-Pathé	1954	Crime, Adventure	Feature	Erwin Hillier	Eng
Flame and the Flesh	Metro-Goldwyn-Mayer	1954	Drama, Romance	Feature	Christopher Challis	Eng
Give a Girl a Break	Metro-Goldwyn-Mayer	1954	Musical, Comedy	Feature	William C. Mellor	US
The Glenn Miller Story	Universal-International	1954	Biography, Musical, Drama, Romance	Feature	William H. Daniels	US
Hansel and Gretel: An Opera Fantasy (SF camera)	Hansel and Gretel Co., RKO	1954	Stop-motion Animation	Feature		US
Happy Ever After aka Tonight's the Night (US)	Anglofilm, Associated British Picture Corporation, Associated British-Pathé	1954	Comedy, Romance	Feature	Stanley Pavey	Eng
Hell Below Zero	Warwick Films, Columbia Pictures	1954	Action, Adventure, Drama, Mystery, Romance, Thriller	Feature	John Wilcox	Eng
His Majesty O'Keefe	Norma Productions, Warner Bros.	1954	Adventure	Feature	Otto Heller	Eng
Knock on Wood (Note: Confirmed three-strip The Cine Technician Oct 1953 p130, Dec 1953 p170)	Dena Productions, Paramount Pictures	1954	Comedy	Feature	Daniel L. Fapp	US
The Love Lottery	Ealing Studios, General Film Distributors	1954	Comedy, Romance	Feature	Douglas Slocombe	Eng
Mad About Men	Group Film Productions, General Film Distributors	1954	Comedy	Feature	Ernest Steward	Eng
Maddalena (Italian)	Société Générale de Cinématographie, Société Nouvelle Pathé Cinéma, Titanus	1954	Drama	Feature	Claude Renoir	Eng
Malaga aka Port of Spain and Fire Over Africa (US)	Film Locations, British Lion	1954	Thriller, Crime, Film Noir	Feature	Christopher Challis	Eng
The Million Pound Note aka Man with a Million, and Big Money (US)	Group Film Productions, General Film Distributors	1954	Comedy, Romance	Feature	Geoffrey Unsworth	Eng
Money from Home (3D – 6-strip)	Wallis-Hazen Inc., Paramount Pictures	1954	Comedy	Feature	Daniel L. Fapp	US
The Purple Plain (hybrid - three-strip studio and Eastmancolor location)	Two Cities Films, General Film Distributors	1954	War, Drama, Romance	Feature	Geoffrey Unsworth	Eng
The Rainbow Jacket	Ealing Studios, General Film Distributors	1954	Drama	Feature	Otto Heller	Eng
Romeo and Juliet (Anglo-Italian)	Verona Film, Universalcine, General Film Distributors	1954	Drama	Feature	Robert Krasker	Eng
The Scarlet Spear (Monopack)	Present Day Productions, United Artists	1954	Adventure, Drama	Feature	Bernard Davies	Eng
Star of India	Raymond Stross Productions, Titanus, Eros Films	1954	Adventure, Drama	Feature	C. M. Pennington-Richards	Eng
They Who Dare	Mayflower Productions, British Lion	1954	War	Feature	Wilkie Cooper	Eng
Ulysses aka Ulisse (Italian)	Producciones Ponti-de Laurentis, Lux Film, Zenith Films, Paramount Pictures (US)	1954	Adventure, Mythology	Feature	Harold Rosson	Eng (Note: Some credit this to Technicolor Italia. However, the laboratory did not open until 1955, three years after filming started.)
West of Zanzibar (part Monopack)	Ealing Studios, General Film Distributors	1954	Adventure, Drama	Feature	Paul Beeson	Eng
You Know What Sailors Are	Group Film Productions, General Film Distributors	1954	Comedy	Feature	Reginald Wyer	Eng
An Annapolis Story	Allied Artists	1955	Drama, War, Romance	Feature	Sam Leavitt	US
Conquest of Space	Paramount Pictures	1955	Adventure, Science Fiction	Feature	Lionel Lindon	US
Le fils de Caroline chérie aka Caroline and the Rebels (French)	Gaumont Production	1955	Adventure, History, Comedy	Feature	Maurice Barry	Eng
Footsteps in the Fog	Film Locations, Columbia Pictures	1955	Drama, Thriller, Romance	Feature	Christopher Challis	Eng
Foxfire (last US three-strip feature)	Universal-International	1955	Drama, Romance	Feature	William H. Daniels	US
French Cancan (French)	Franco London Films	1955	History, Comedy, Drama	Feature	Michel Kelber	Eng
Geordie aka Wee Geordie (US)	Individual Pictures, British Lion	1955	Comedy	Feature	Wilkie Cooper	Eng
The Ladykillers	Ealing Studios, General Film Distributors	1955	Comedy, Crime	Feature	Otto Heller	Eng
Ludwig II: Glanz und Ende eines Königs (German)	Aura, Bavaria Film	1955	Historical, Drama	Feature	Douglas Slocombe	Eng
Raising a Riot	Wessex Films, London Films, British Lion	1955	Comedy	Feature	Christopher Challis	Eng
This Island Earth	Universal-International	1955	Sci-Fi	Feature	Clifford Stine	US
To Paris With Love (hybrid - three-strip studio and Eastmancolor location)	Two Cities Films, General Film Distributors	1955	Comedy, Romance	Feature	Reginald Wyer	Eng
Touch and Go	Ealing Studios, J. Arthur Rank Film Distributors	1955	Comedy	Feature	Douglas Slocombe	Eng
The Feminine Touch aka The Gentle Touch (US) aka A Lamp is Heavy (Can) (last UK three-strip feature)	Ealing Studios, J. Arthur Rank Film Distributors	1956	Drama	Feature	Paul Beeson	Eng
Invitation to the Dance	Metro-Goldwyn-Mayer	1956 (delayed)	Dance	Feature	Freddy Young, Joseph Ruttenberg	Eng/US (Note: Production moved to Hollywood in 1953.)
Jet Pilot	RKO Radio Pictures, Universal-International	1957 (delayed)	War, Drama, Romance	Feature	Winton C. Hoch (Note: Some of the aerial footage was shot by cinematographer William Clothier using an Arriflex Camera.)	US
Rembrandt, schilder van de mens aka Rembrandt: Painter of Man (Dutch)	Arts and Sciences Ministry of Education, Netherlands	1957	Documentary	Short	Stanley W. Sayer	Eng
