= Give Me the Simple Life =

1945 song by Rube Bloom and Harry Ruby

"Give Me the Simple Life" is a 1945 song written by Rube Bloom (music) and Harry Ruby (lyrics). It was introduced in the 1946 film Wake Up and Dream.

== Chart recordings ==
- Bing Crosby - Decca single, recorded August 29, 1945 with Jimmy Dorsey and His Orchestra. This charted briefly in 1946.
- Benny Goodman & his Orchestra with vocal by Liza Morrow, (Columbia single, 1945). This also charted briefly in 1946.

== Film appearances ==
- 1946 The Dark Corner - played on the radio in the background. This film had a May, 1946 release date which preceded the December, 1946 release date of Wake Up And Dream.
- 1946 Wake Up and Dream - sung by John Payne and June Haver.
- 1995 Father of the Bride Part II - sung by Steve Tyrell
- 1998 Skinnamarink TV - sung by Sharon, Lois & Bram
