= The Girl Next Door (1953 film) =

1953 film by Richard Sale

- Directed by: Richard Sale
- Written by: Isobel Lennart
- Story by: Leslie Bush-Fekete; Maria Fagyas
- Produced by: Robert Bassler
- Starring: June Haver; Dan Dailey; Dennis Day
- Cinematography: Leon Shamroy
- Edited by: Robert L. Simpson
- Music by: Lionel Newman
- Production company: 20th Century Fox
- Distributed by: 20th Century Fox
- Release date: May 13, 1953
- Running time: 92 minutes
- Country: United States
- Language: English
- Box office: $1.2 million (US)

The Girl Next Door is a 1953 American musical comedy film directed by Richard Sale and starring June Haver, Dan Dailey, and Dennis Day. It was made and released by 20th Century Fox.

== Plot ==
A popular performer, Jeannie Laird decides to buy her first house and celebrate with a big party. The guests' enjoyment is interfered with by the happenings at the home of the next door neighbor, Bill Carter.

Carter is a comic-strip artist. He prides himself on every story he tells being true to life, including that of 10-year-old son Joey, whom he is raising alone. When a relationship blossoms between Bill and Jeannie after a shaky start, a neglected Joey ends up blabbing to Bill's bosses that the comic strip's adventures have become far more fiction than fact.

== Cast ==
- Dan Dailey as Bill Carter
- June Haver as Jeannie Laird
- Dennis Day as Reed Appleton
- Billy Gray as Joey Carter
- Cara Williams as Rosie Green
- Natalie Schafer as Evelyn, the maid
- Clinton Sundberg as Samuels, the butler
- Hayden Rorke as Henry Fields
- Mary Jane Saunders as Kitty

== Background ==
This was June Haver's last film appearance. Haver had gained fame in the mid-to-late 1940s as a musical star for Fox; she starred in films like The Dolly Sisters, Irish Eyes Are Smiling, Where Do We Go from Here?, I Wonder Who's Kissing Her Now, Look for the Silver Lining, and I'll Get By. Haver departed from films to join a convent in 1952, but left the convent six months later and married actor Fred MacMurray.

When released, The Girl Next Door drew mixed press reviews; it did moderately well at the box-office.

== Bibliography ==
- Dick, Bernard F. The Golden Age Musicals of Darryl F. Zanuck: The Gentleman Preferred Blondes. University Press of Mississippi, 2022.
