= Man Alive (1945 film) =

1945 film by Ray Enright

- Directed by: Ray Enright
- Written by: Edwin Blum
- Story by: John Tucker Battle; Jerome Cady
- Produced by: Robert Fellows
- Starring: Pat O'Brien; Adolphe Menjou; Ellen Drew; Rudy Vallée
- Cinematography: Frank Redman
- Edited by: Marvin Coil
- Music by: Leigh Harline
- Distributed by: RKO Radio Pictures
- Release date: November 16, 1945 (U.S.)
- Running time: 70 minutes
- Country: United States
- Language: English
- Budget: $738,000

Man Alive is a 1945 American romantic comedy film directed by Ray Enright and starring Pat O'Brien, Adolphe Menjou, Ellen Drew and Rudy Vallée.

== Plot ==
The successful businessman Michael O'Flaherty "Speed" McBride (Pat O'Brien) is knocked out when a tramp he picked up drives his car into a river. Speed is rescued by a passing showboat. Meanwhile, the dead tramp is mistaken for Speed. Speed is eager to clear up the misidentification, but Kismet (Adolphe Menjou), a member of the crew, talks him into postponing that revelation. Speed has revealed that he is having marital problems with his wife Connie (Ellen Drew). Kismet convinces him to pretend to be a ghost to persuade Connie to get rid of a romantic rival, Gordon Tolliver (Rudy Vallée), Connie's old admirer. Comic hijinks ensue, but in the end, Connie realizes she still loves Speed.

== Cast ==
- Pat O'Brien as Michael O'Flaherty "Speed" McBride
- Adolphe Menjou as Kismet
- Ellen Drew as Connie McBride
- Rudy Vallée as Gordon Tolliver
- Fortunio Bonanova as Prof. Zorado
- Joseph Crehan as Dr. James P. Whitney
- Jonathan Hale as Osborne
- Minna Gombell as Aunt Sophie
- Jason Robards, Sr. as Henry Fletcher (as Jason Robards)
- Jack Norton as Willie the Wino
- Carl 'Alfalfa' Switzer as Ignatius
