= Ramona (1936 film) =

1936 film

- Theatrical release poster
- Directed by: Henry King
- Written by: Stuart Anthony; Paul Hervey Fox; Sonya Levien; Lillian Wurtzel
- Screenplay by: Lamar Trotti
- Based on: Ramona; 1884 novel by Helen Hunt Jackson
- Produced by: John Stone; Sol M. Wurtzel
- Starring: Loretta Young; Don Ameche
- Cinematography: William V. Skall
- Edited by: Alfred DeGaetano
- Music by: Alfred Newman
- Color process: Technicolor
- Production company: 20th Century Fox
- Distributed by: 20th Century Fox
- Release date: September 25, 1936
- Running time: 84 minutes
- Country: United States
- Language: English
- Budget: $600,000
- Box office: $1 million

Ramona is a 1936 American Drama Western film directed by Henry King, based on Helen Hunt Jackson's 1884 novel Ramona. This was the third adaptation of the film, and the first one with sound. It was the fourth American feature film using the new three strip Technicolor process. It starred Loretta Young and Don Ameche. Filming started on May 11, 1936 and ended on June 29, 1936.

The New York Times praised its use of new Technicolor technology but found the plot "a piece of unadulterated hokum." It thought "Ramona is a pretty impossible rôle these heartless days" and Don Ameche "a bit too Oxonian" for a chief's son.

The film's copyright was renewed on June 16, 1964.

== Cast ==
- Loretta Young as Ramona
- Don Ameche as Alessandro
- Kent Taylor as Felipe Moreno
- Pauline Frederick as Señora Moreno
- Jane Darwell as Aunt Ri Hyar
- Katherine DeMille as Margarita
- Victor Kilian as Father Gaspara
- John Carradine as Jim Farrar
- J. Carrol Naish as Juan Can
- Pedro de Cordoba as Father Salvierderra
- Charles Waldron as Dr. Weaver
- Claire Du Brey as Marda
- Russell Simpson as Scroggs
- William Benedict as Joseph Hyar
- D'Arcy Corrigan as Jeff (uncredited)
- Ethan Laidlaw as Bill (uncredited)
