= John Tucker Battle =

American screenwriter (1902–1962)

- Born: October 1, 1902; Waco, Texas, U.S.
- Died: October 31, 1962 (aged 60); Hollywood, California, U.S.
- Occupation: Screenwriter
- Years active: 1944–1961
- Spouse: Rosemary B. Battle

John Tucker Battle (October 1, 1902 – October 31, 1962) was an American screenwriter. He wrote for television programs including Bonanza, Have Gun, Will Travel, Maverick, Colt .45, The Restless Gun, Bat Masterson and Black Saddle. He also wrote for and acted in radio programs in the 1930s and 1940s. He was buried in Forest Lawn Memorial Park.

== Selected filmography ==
- Irish Eyes Are Smiling (1944)
- Captain Eddie (1945)
- Man Alive (1945)
- Captain from Castile (1947) - (uncredited)
- So Dear to My Heart (1948)
- The Frogmen (1951)
- Invaders from Mars (1953) - (uncredited)
- A Man Alone (1955)
- Lisbon (1956)
- Shoot-Out at Medicine Bend (1957)
