= Wake Up and Dream (1946 film) =

1946 film by Lloyd Bacon

- Theatrical release poster
- Directed by: Lloyd Bacon
- Written by: Elick Moll
- Based on: The Enchanted Voyage by Robert Nathan
- Produced by: Walter Morosco
- Starring: June Haver; John Payne; Charlotte Greenwood
- Cinematography: Harry Jackson
- Edited by: Robert Fritch
- Music by: Cyril J. Mockridge
- Production company: Twentieth Century-Fox
- Distributed by: Twentieth Century-Fox
- Release date: December 2, 1946
- Running time: 92 minutes
- Country: United States
- Language: English
- Box office: $900,000 The film features songs written by Rube Bloom and Harry Ruby.

Wake Up and Dream is a 1946 American Technicolor musical fantasy film directed by Lloyd Bacon and starring June Haver, John Payne and Charlotte Greenwood. The film was released by 20th Century Fox and was based on the novel The Enchanted Voyage by Robert Nathan.The Enchanted Voyage was the working title and the title of the film in the United Kingdom.

== Plot ==
Jeff Cairn enlists in the Navy. He puts younger sister Nella in a cousin's care where she will be sent to a convent. Nella runs away back to the boarding house where they lived and where old Henry Pecket let her work on his sloop, docked out back.

A waitress, Jeff's sweetheart Jenny, agrees to move into Sara March's boarding house to look after the girl. Sara mistakenly believes Henry is inviting women aboard his boat and sells Henry's boat as an act of revenge. Jeff is reported to be missing in action, while the sloop with Henry, Nella and Jenny aboard is caught in a storm and drifts far away in a flood. Nella does not believe that Jeff is dead and believes with all her heart that they will find Jeff on a dream island on their enchanted voyage.

== Cast ==
Actor	Role
John Payne	Jeff Cairn
June Haver	Jenny
Charlotte Greenwood	Sara March
Connie Marshall	Nella Cairn
John Ireland	Howard Williams
Clem Bevans	Henry Pecket
Charles Russell	Lieutenant Coles
Lee Patrick	The Blonde
Charles D. Brown	Lieutenant Commander
Irving Bacon	Toll Gate Attendant

== Soundtrack ==
- "Give Me the Simple Life"

Music by Rube Bloom
Lyrics by Harry Ruby
Sung by John Payne and June Haver

- I Wish I Could Tell You

Music by Rube Bloom
Lyrics by Harry Ruby

- Into the Sun

Music by Rube Bloom
Lyrics by Harry Ruby

- Bell Bottom Trousers

Music traditional
Lyrics by Harry Ruby

- We're Off to See the Wizard

Lyrics by E.Y. Harburg
Music by Harold Arlen

== Reception ==
Nathan called the film "a wretched little thing."
