= The Daughter of Rosie O'Grady =

1950 film by David Butler

- Theatrical poster
- Directed by: David Butler
- Screenplay by: Jack Rose; Melville Shavelson; Peter Milne
- Story by: Jack Rose; Melville Shavelson
- Produced by: William Jacobs
- Starring: June Haver; Gordon MacRae
- Cinematography: Wilfred M. Cline
- Edited by: Irene Morra
- Color process: Technicolor
- Production company: Warner Bros. Pictures
- Release dates: March 30, 1950 (New York City); April 29, 1950 (U.S.)
- Running time: 104 minutes
- Country: United States
- Language: English
- Budget: $1,402,000
- Box office: $2,803,000 $2,250,000 (US rentals)

The Daughter of Rosie O'Grady is a 1950 American musical film directed by David Butler and starring June Haver and Gordon MacRae. The story mostly concerns the lives of musical performers in New York in the closing years of the 19th century. Most of the songs were written for the film, but "Rose of Tralee" dates from the 19th century, and the song "The Daughter of Rosie O'Grady" dates from 1917.

== Plot ==
At the end of the Spanish–American War in 1898, grumpy and overprotective Irish widower Dennis O'Grady has three daughters. The oldest, Katie, welcomes her husband James Moore, whom she has married in secret, home from the army. The youngest two, Patricia and Maureen, pass a vaudeville theater owned by Tony Pastor. Patricia recognizes the man from earlier that afternoon when he had mocked her father, and she scolds him for his actions.

Dennis is advised by his friend Miklos to warn his daughters about the immoral behavior of most men before it is too late. He is neither aware of Katie's marriage and pregnancy nor Patricia's flirtations with a vaudeville actor. Since the death of his wife Rosie, a famous vaudeville actress, Dennis has been wary of vaudeville, feeling that the hard life of vaudevillians was the cause of Rosie's death. When Patricia is caught by her father accompanying Tony, she lies by saying that Tony is a college student. Dennis is impressed by Tony and decides that he would be perfect to date Katie. Patricia is upset but keeps quiet, afraid of her father's judgment.

Patricia tells Tony that she is interested in joining him on the stage, but Tony thinks that she should tell her father the truth. Dennis is outraged when he learns about Tony's connections to vaudeville and locks Patricia in her room, but she sneaks away to join Tony on the stage, where she quickly becomes a big hit. Dennis learns that one of his daughters is expecting twins and surmises that it must be Patricia. Devastated, he drinks and then finds trouble with the police. He disowns all his daughters, including the innocent Maureen.

Lonely without his daughters, Dennis becomes ill. Patricia is informed by Miklos about her father's health and quickly gathers her sisters and their men to take care of him. Dennis initially does not accept their company until he learns that Katie has just given birth to triplets. Patricia and Tony become engaged.

== Cast ==
- June Haver as Patricia O'Grady
- Gordon MacRae as Tony Pastor
- James Barton as Dennis O'Grady
- S. Z. Sakall as Miklos "Mike" Teretzky
- Gene Nelson as Doug Martin
- Sean McClory as James Moore
- Debbie Reynolds as Maureen O'Grady
- Marsha Jones as Katie O'Grady
- Jane Darwell as Mrs. Murphy
- Virginia Lee as Virginia Lee

Cast notes

- The role of Maureen was written specifically for the 17-year-old Reynolds, and it was her first speaking role in a film. Director David Butler advised her to avoid "acting" and just recite the lines as she would say them herself. Another problem for Reynolds was physical: Because her ears protruded from her head, they had to be glued back, but the glue failed under the hot lights. Reynolds' mother eventually solved the problem by having her daughter's ears pinned back surgically.
- S. Z. Sakall is listed in the film's opening credits using his nickname of Cuddles Sakall.

== Production ==
The film had been in preproduction for years before its release with the working title of A Night at Tony Pastor's. A 1942 article announced that George Raft would play the lead role.

== Reception ==
Critics agreed that the plot of the film was uninspired, but some had a favorable opinion of the musical numbers. Bosley Crowther called it "a standard musical film" with musical numbers "both generous and likeable," but a plot that was "not only fake but formula-made." Variety called it "another one of those familiarly patterned musicals with a backstage plot. It has charm, some wit, nice music and good pace to fulfill all demands of the general market." Harrison's Reports called it "consistently entertaining" despite a "thin, commonplace story." The Monthly Film Bulletin dismissed the film for "indifferent tunes and slow-paced direction" as well as an "unoriginal" plot, with the "only bright moments" coming from Gene Nelson. John McCarten of The New Yorker wrote that the film was "about an aging horsecar driver who doesn't want his daughter to go into theatrical work, on the ground that slaving in vaudeville contributed to the death of his beloved wife. If the old girl's acting was anything like that of June Haver, who plays the daughter, she was probably a victim of justifiable homicide rather than exhaustion."

=== Box office ===
According to Warner Bros. accounts, the film earned $2,158,000 domestically and $645,000 foreign.
