= June Haver =

American actress (1926–2005)

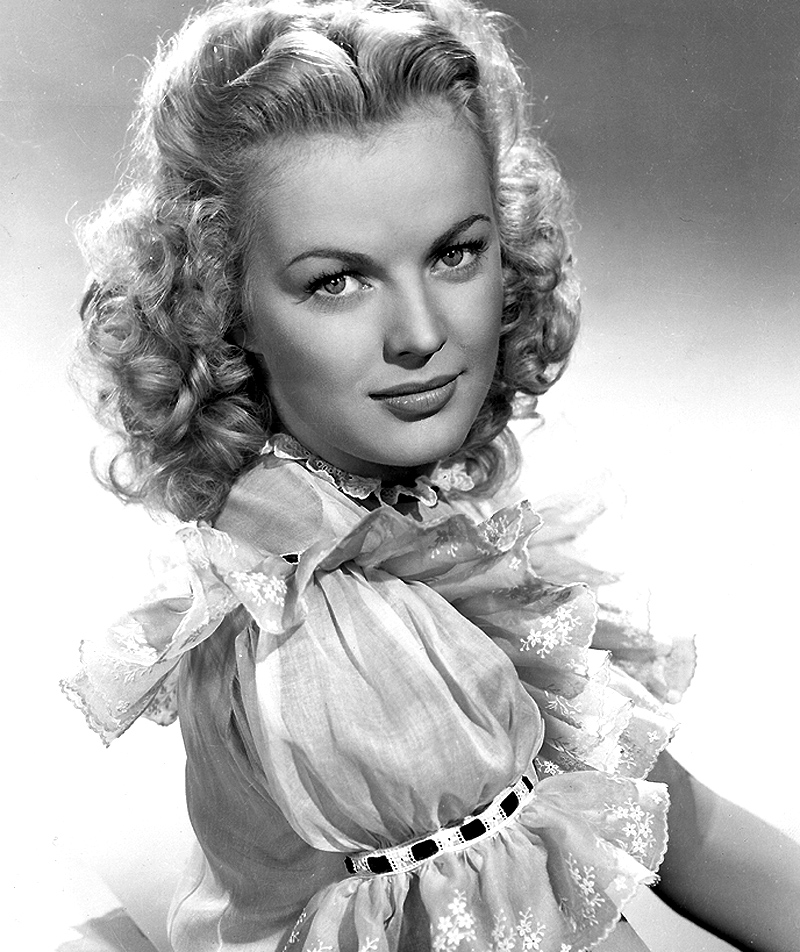
- Haver in 1947
- Born: Beverly June Stovenour; June 10, 1926; Rock Island, Illinois, U.S.
- Died: July 4, 2005 (aged 79); Los Angeles, California, U.S.
- Occupations: Actress; singer; dancer
- Years active: 1941–1953
- Known for: Where Do We Go from Here?; The Dolly Sisters; Irish Eyes Are Smiling; Wake Up and Dream; Three Little Girls in Blue
- Spouses: Jimmy Zito (m. 1947; div. 1948) Fred MacMurray (m. 1954; died 1991)
- Children: 2
- Awards: Hollywood Walk of Fame

June Haver (born Beverly June Stovenour; June 10, 1926 – July 4, 2005) was an American film actress, singer and dancer. Once groomed by 20th Century Fox to be "the next Betty Grable," Haver appeared in a string of musicals, but she never achieved Grable's popularity. Haver's second husband was the actor Fred MacMurray, whom she married after she retired from showbusiness.

== Early life ==
Beverly June Stovenour was born in Rock Island, Illinois, and later took the surname of her stepfather, Bert Haver. Her mother Maria Haver (née Carter) was an actress and her father Fred Christian Stovenour was a musician. After the family moved to Ohio, seven-year-old Haver entered and won a contest of the Cincinnati Conservatory of Music. At age eight, she won a film test by imitating famous actresses including Greta Garbo, Katharine Hepburn and Helen Hayes, but her mother prohibited her from becoming a child actress because she felt that Haver was too young to work in the film industry.

When Haver was 10, the family returned to Rock Island, where she began performing for Rudy Vallée and became a well-known child star on the radio. She worked regularly as a band singer by the time that she was in her teens, performing with the Ted Fio Rito Orchestra for $75 a week. She also worked with bandleaders Dick Jurgens and Freddy Martin.

== Career ==
In the summer of 1942, Haver moved to Hollywood, where she finished high school. She acted in plays in her spare time, and during a performance as a southern belle, she was discovered by a scout from 20th Century Fox. In 1943, Haver signed a $3,500-per-week contract with the studio and made her film debut playing an uncredited role as a hat-check girl in The Gang's All Here. She was dropped shortly after because the studio executives felt that she looked too young, but she was later signed again after her costume and hairstyle were changed.

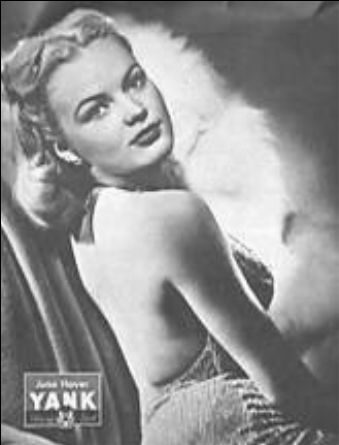
Pin-up photo of Haver for Yank, the Army Weekly in 1945

20th Century Fox had plans to mold Haver as a glamour girl stand-in for the studio's two greatest stars, Alice Faye and Betty Grable. She debuted on screen in a supporting role as Cri-Cri in Home in Indiana (1944) and had just turned 17 years old when her scenes were filmed. Even before Home in Indiana was released, she was assigned to replace Faye in the Technicolor musical Irish Eyes Are Smiling. Later that year, she costarred with her future husband Fred MacMurray in Where Do We Go From Here?, which was the only time that the pair appeared together in a film.

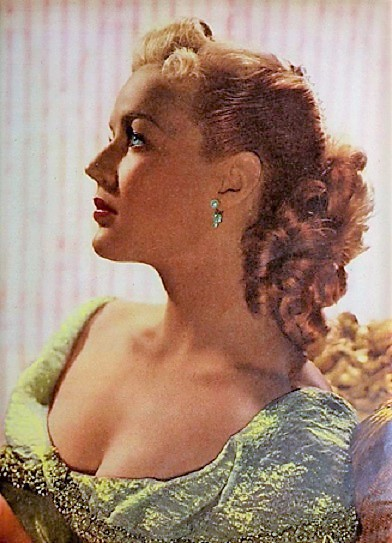
Haver in 1952

During her career at Fox, Haver was originally groomed to be the next Betty Grable (standing a diminutive 5'2", she was known as "Pocket Grable"). She costarred with Grable in the 1945 film The Dolly Sisters, for which she had to gain weight. While filming, rumors about a possible clash between the two actresses arose, mostly because of their frequent comparison, but Haver said: "Betty is a big star and I'm just starting. I try to be nice to her, and she reciprocated by being just as nice to me. It's silly to think two girls can't work together without quarreling. You see, I've two sisters. I'm the ham between the bread and butter — the middle sister — and I understand girls pretty well. Betty likes to talk about her baby, so we talk about her baby."

In 1946, Haver starred and received top billing in Wake Up and Dream and Three Little Girls in Blue, both of which were well-received and brought moderate success. The following year, the role of Katie was written into the film I Wonder Who's Kissing Her Now just for Haver.

Haver's comedy star turn in 1948's Scudda Hoo! Scudda Hay! was a major success. The same year, she starred as Marilyn Miller in the musical Look for the Silver Lining (1949).

The following year, she starred in The Daughter of Rosie O'Grady and I'll Get By. In 1951, Haver was teamed with Fox's newest asset, Marilyn Monroe, and previous costar William Lundigan (her co-star from I'll Get By) in the low-budget comedy Love Nest. Though Haver was the lead and received top billing, most of the film's publicity centered on Monroe, who had a minor role and garnered under-the-title billing. Love Nest was Haver's only full-length film in black and white. Her other 15 films between 1943 and 1953 were shot in three-strip Technicolor.

Following her marriage to MacMurray in 1954, Haver mostly retired from acting (her last appearances were as herself on The Lucy-Desi Comedy Hour in 1958 and in Disneyland '59). Her final film appearance was in 1953's The Girl Next Door. Haver and MacMurray adopted two daughters and remained together until MacMurray's death in 1991.

At the urging of friends Ann Miller and Ann Rutherford, Haver finally joined the Academy of Motion Picture Arts and Sciences at the age of 75. For her contribution to the motion picture industry, Haver has a star on the Hollywood Walk of Fame at 1777 Vine Street.

== Personal life ==
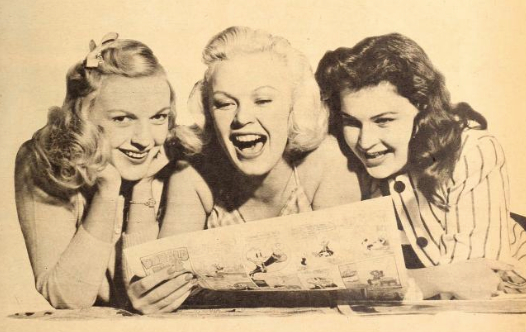
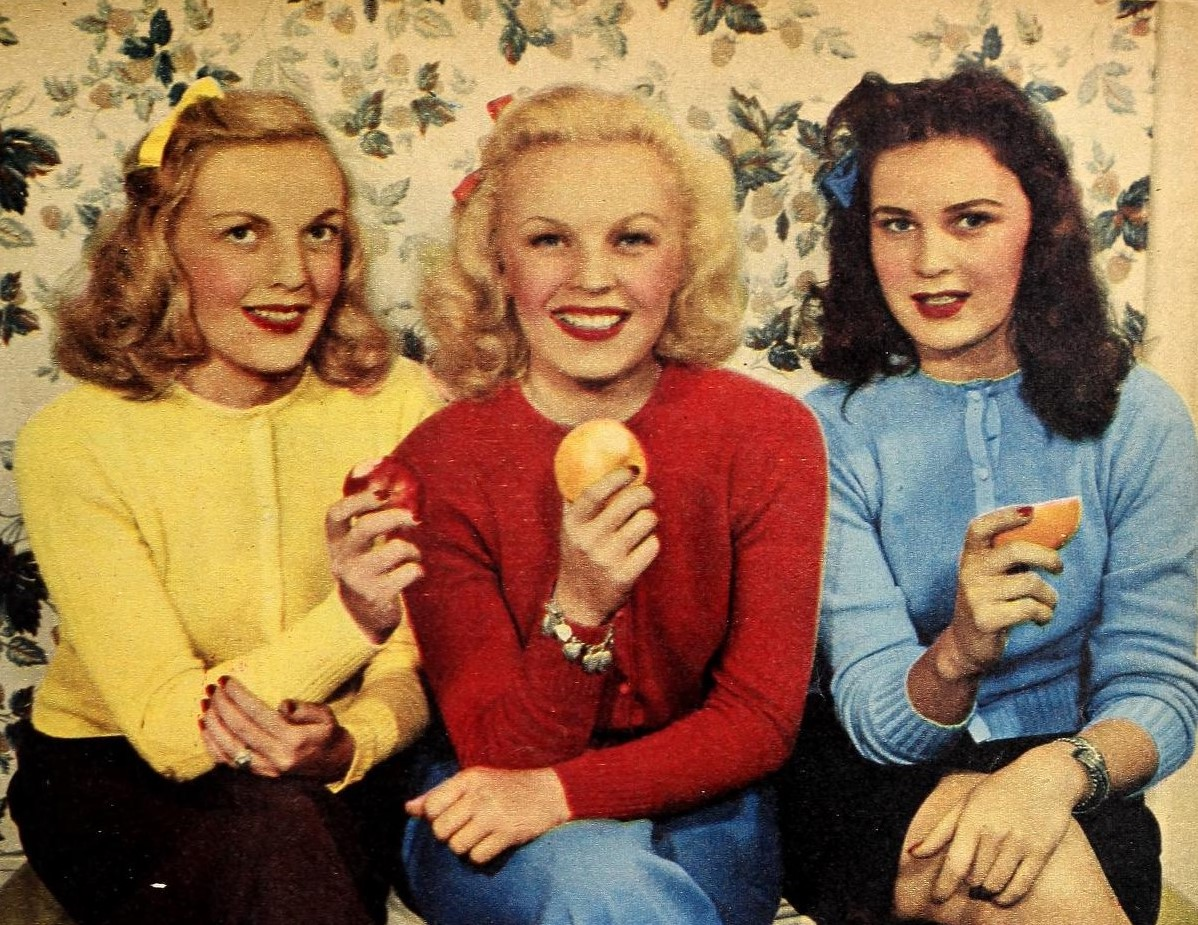
Haver (center) with her sisters shortly after moving to Hollywood, 1946

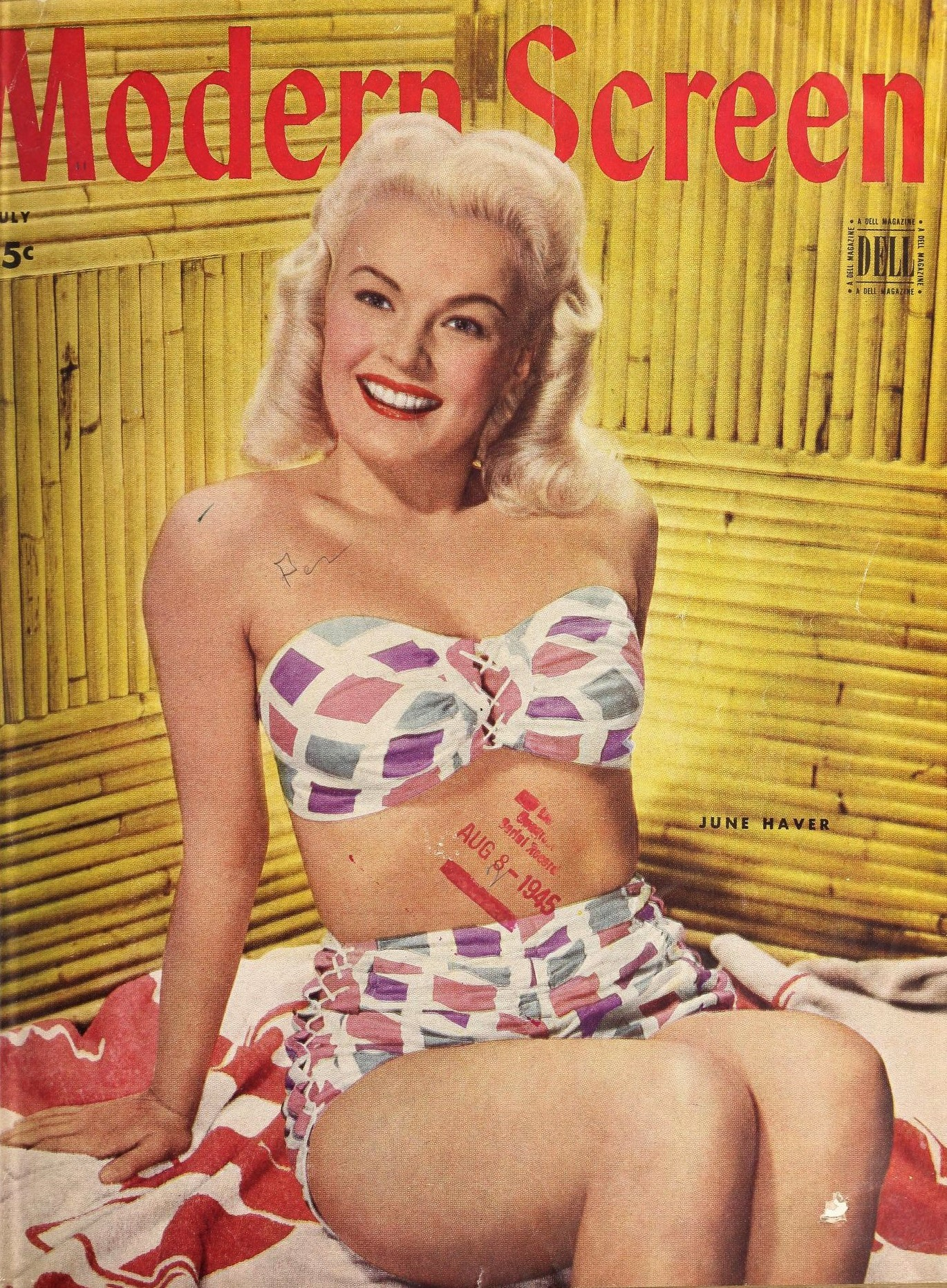
Haver on the cover of July 1945 issue of Modern Screen magazine

Haver insisted that she had always been very close with her family. Her sisters followed her to Hollywood and served as her stand-ins, and her mother was Haver's personal secretary.

On March 9, 1947, Haver married trumpet player James Zito. She had met him at age 15 while touring with Ted Fio Rito's orchestra. They initially lost contact after Haver moved from Illinois to Beverly Hills but started dating when Haver made a short visit to her home town when she was already a film actress. Haver filed for divorce less than a year after eloping with Zito, winning interlocutory decree on March 25, 1948. She admitted to the press that the marriage was a failure from the beginning, saying: "I want to forget as soon as possible. We hadn't been married hours before I realized I had never really known Jimmy. He was a stranger. He was either down in the dumps or up high. I never knew from one moment to the next how he would be."

After her divorce from Zito, Haver started dating Dr. John L. Duzik, whom she had dated before her marriage to Zito. They planned to marry, but Duzik died on October 31, 1949, following surgery complications. While taking care of him in his final days, she started attending church more often. According to friends, she was inspired to become a nun during this period. Following Duzik's death, Haver reportedly became tired of Hollywood and did not fall in love with the men whom she dated afterward. In February 1953, Haver became a postulant nun with the Sisters of Charity of Leavenworth, an organization based in Leavenworth, Kansas, and she stayed until October, saying she left because of "poor health."

Around this time, Haver met Fred MacMurray, one of the wealthiest and most conservative actors in Hollywood, and a romantic relationship developed. On June 28, 1954, they were married. She told the press: "When I married Fred, he was terribly set in his ways. He was a fuss-budget. He hadn't quite progressed to being a lint picker, but he was already an ash-tray emptier, and that's just about as set in his ways as a man can get." Haver insisted on adopting a girl, but MacMurray, 18 years her senior, initially refused, explaining that he already had been a father. Shortly after, he agreed to adopt a child and, with the help of a doctor, they were able to adopt twin daughters. MacMurray died in 1991.

Haver died from respiratory failure on July 4, 2005, in Brentwood, California, at the age of 79. She was buried with MacMurray at Holy Cross Cemetery in Culver City, California.

Haver was a Republican and supported Ronald Reagan's campaign for governor of California in 1966.

== Archive ==
The Academy Film Archive houses the Fred MacMurray-June Haver Collection. The film material is complemented by material in the Fred MacMurray and June Haver papers at the academy's Margaret Herrick Library.

== Filmography ==
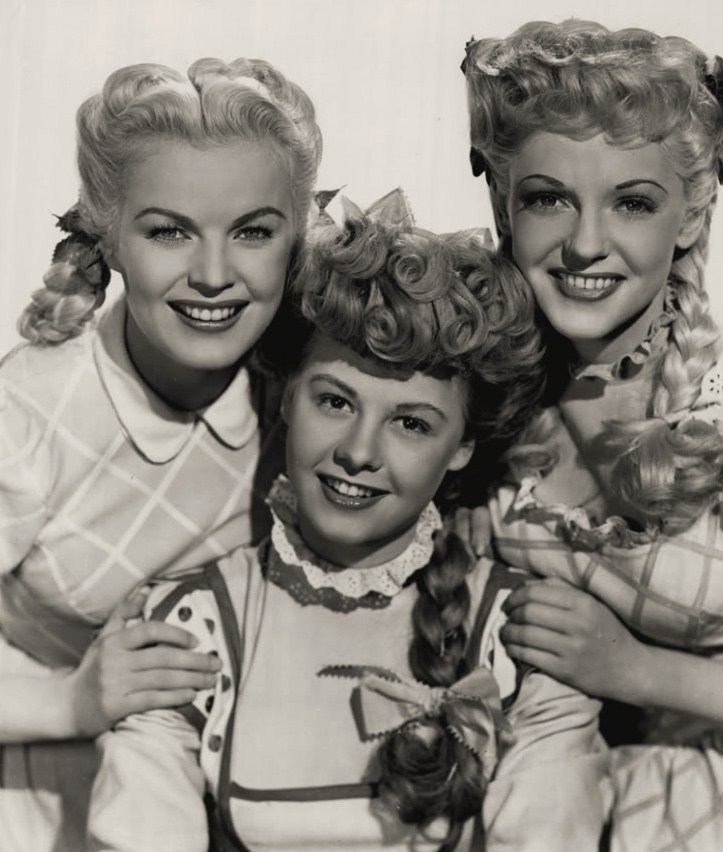
L-R: June Haver, Vera-Ellen, and Vivian Blaine in Three Little Girls in Blue (1946)

Year	Title	Role
1943	The Gang's All Here	Chorus Girl / Hat-Check Girl (uncredited)
1944	Home in Indiana	"Cri-Cri" Boole
1944	Irish Eyes Are Smiling	Mary "Irish" O'Neill
1944	Something for the Boys	Chorine (uncredited)
1945	Where Do We Go from Here?	Lucilla Powell / Gretchen / Indian
1945	The Dolly Sisters	Roszika "Rosie" Dolly
1946	Three Little Girls in Blue	Pam Charters
1946	Wake Up and Dream	Jenny
1947	I Wonder Who's Kissing Her Now	Katie McCullem
1948	Scudda Hoo! Scudda Hay!	Rad McGill
1949	Look for the Silver Lining	Marilyn Miller
1949	Oh, You Beautiful Doll	Doris Fisher
1950	The Daughter of Rosie O'Grady	Patricia O'Grady
1950	I'll Get By	Liza Martin
1951	Love Nest	Connie Scott
1953	The Girl Next Door	Jeannie Laird
