= The Dolly Sisters (film) =

1945 film by Irving Cummings

- Theatrical poster
- Directed by: Irving Cummings
- Written by: John Francis Larkin; Marian Spitzer
- Produced by: George Jessel
- Starring: Betty Grable; June Haver; John Payne
- Cinematography: Ernest Palmer
- Edited by: Barbara McLean
- Music by: Alfred Newman; Cyril J. Mockridge; Charles E. Henderson; David Buttolph
- Distributed by: 20th Century Fox
- Release dates: November 14, 1945 (New York City); February 1, 1946 (Los Angeles)
- Running time: 114 minutes
- Country: United States
- Language: English
- Box office: $4 million (US/ Canada rentals)

The Dolly Sisters is a 1945 American Technicolor biographical film about the Dolly Sisters, identical twins who became famous as entertainers on Broadway and in Europe in the early years of the 20th century as Jennie and Rosie Dolly (Yansci and Roszika Deutsch), Hungarian-born entertainers. It starred Betty Grable as Jenny, June Haver as Rosie and John Payne as Harry Fox.

== Plot ==
In 1904, Uncle Latsie comes to New York from Hungary with two little nieces, Jenny and Rosie who immediately take to cafe dancing. In 1912, they're still at it, but to pay Uncle's card debts they decide to go into vaudeville. They meet another up-and-coming act, singer Harry Fox. Jenny falls in love with him.

Harry struggles while the sisters' fame rises. Rosie is distrustful but Jenny dates him anyway. Harry sings to Jenny the latest song he has composed. A producer hears it and gives him the break he's been waiting for. Jenny and Harry get married but, just as success comes to Harry, war in Europe breaks out and he enlists.

Rosie persuades Jenny to take an engagement with the Folies Bergere in Paris. As they tour Europe and achieve more success and admirers, the war ends. Harry asks her to come home but Rosie asks her to stay with the show. Harry insinuates there should be a divorce. The Dolly sisters continue their tour of Europe, where Jenny takes to gambling and dates one of her wealthy suitors.

Rosie is secretly engaged to her American boyfriend Irving Netcher, who owns department stores. Now she plans to leave the act but Jenny overhears this and decides to accept a marriage proposal. As they drive away from a party, Jenny is overwhelmed by memories of Harry and ends up crashing the car. Harry, who just got engaged to Leonora Baldwin, shows his concern. After several months of recovering in a French hospital, Jenny returns to New York. During a benefit show, she and Rosie reunite as Dolly Sisters. Harry, who also performs, introduces Leonora, who realizes that Harry still loves Jenny and leaves the theater during Harry's act. On stage, Jenny and Rosie both join Harry to finish his number.

== Cast ==
- Betty Grable as Yansci "Jenny" Dolly
- John Payne as Harry Fox
- June Haver as Rozsika "Rosie" Dolly
- S.Z. Sakall as Uncle "Latsie" (a nickname for László)
- Reginald Gardiner as Tony, Duke of Breck
- Frank Latimore as Irving Netcher
- Gene Sheldon as Professor Winnup, seal trainer
- Sig Ruman as Ignatz Tsimmis
- Trudy Marshall as Lenora Baldwin
- Lester Allen as Morrie Keno
- Brooks Benedict as Party Guest
- Trude Berliner as German Actress
- Eddie Borden as Man on Bus
- Eugene Borden as Polaire's Chauffeur
- Virginia Brissac as Nun
- André Charlot as Monsieur Philippe
- Gino Corrado as French Trainman
- George Davis as French Juggler
- Cathy Downs as Miss Mascara
- Charles Evans as Man
- Betty Farrington as Mrs. Smith
- Frank Ferguson as Reporter at Boat Docking
- Theresa Harris as Ellabelle
- Paul Hurst as Tim Dowling
- Eddie Kane as Sam Harris
- Colin Kenny as Speakeasy table member
- Crauford Kent as Man
- Mildred Kornman as Lady in Booking Office
- Collette Lyons as Flo Daly
- J. Farrell MacDonald as Opera Stage Doorman
- Mae Marsh as Annie
- Vivian Mason as Gay 90s Glamour Girl
- Robert Middlemass as Oscar Hammerstein
- William Newell as Bartender
- G. Raymond Nye as Tom
- George O'Hara as Frank Tinny
- Frank Orth as Stage Manager at the Bijou
- Julius Tannen as Man
- Phil Tead as Speakeasy Patron
- Ricki Van Dusen as Mlle. Polaire

== Reception ==
The film was nominated for the American Film Institute's 2006 list AFI's Greatest Movie Musicals.
