= Irish Eyes Are Smiling =

1944 film by Gregory Ratoff

- Theatrical release poster
- Directed by: Gregory Ratoff
- Screenplay by: Earl Baldwin; John Tucker Battle
- Story by: E.A. Ellington
- Starring: Monty Woolley; June Haver; Dick Haymes
- Cinematography: Harry Jackson
- Edited by: Harmon Jones
- Distributed by: 20th Century Fox
- Release date: November 7, 1944 (United States)
- Running time: 90 minutes
- Language: English
- Box office: $2,250,000

Irish Eyes Are Smiling is a 1944 United States musical film that chronicles the life of popular Irish song composer Ernest R. Ball. The screenplay by Earl Baldwin and John Tucker Battle is based on a story by E. A. Ellington. The film was directed by Gregory Ratoff and produced by Damon Runyon for 20th Century Fox. The film was nominated for the Academy Award for Best Original Score in 1944.

== Plot ==
The movie is a musical account of the life of Ernest R. Ball, a gifted composer of many popular Irish songs, including the titular one.

== Cast ==
- Monty Woolley ... Edgar Brawley
- June Haver ... Mary "Irish" O'Neill
- Dick Haymes ... Ernest R. Ball
- Anthony Quinn ... Al Jackson
- Beverly Whitney ... Lucille Lacey
- Maxie Rosenbloom ... Stanley Ketchel
- Veda Ann Borg ... Belle La Tour
- Clarence Kolb ... Leo Betz
- Leonard Warren ... Opera Singer
- Blanche Thebom ... Opera Singer
- Chick Chandler ... Stage Manager
- Muriel Page... Specialty Dancer
- Kenny Williams ... Specialty Dancer
- Michael Dalmatoff ... Headwaiter

== Radio adaptation ==
Irish Eyes Are Smiling was presented on Lux Radio Theatre March 15, 1948. Haymes reprised his role from the movie in the adaptation.
