= List of films about horse racing =

List of films

The following is a list of films featuring horse racing.

== List ==
Year	Title	Notes
1895	The Derby	One of cinema's earliest depictions of racing, set at 1895 Epsom Derby.
1913	Kissing Cup	Silent film about a jockey who manages to escape a gang of kidnappers and make it to Sandown in time to win his race.
1917	A Gamble for Love	Silent film about a lord who tries to interfere with a lady's horse.
1919	Desert Gold	Australian film starring the famous racehorse Desert Gold
1920	A Dead Certainty	A British film about a rider pressured to fix a race.
1921	The Sport of Kings	A man (Victor McLaglen) looks out for his young ward and her racehorse.
1922	The Kentucky Derby	Trainer goes to great lengths to keep an owner's son far from the Derby.
1925	Kentucky Pride	Directed by John Ford, a silent film that includes Man o' War.
1926	The Shamrock Handicap	Irish lass (Janet Gaynor) comes to America with horse Dark Rosaleen for steeplechase race.
1931	Sporting Blood	Rid Riddell (Clark Gable) enters his horse Tommy Boy in the Kentucky Derby.
1931	Sweepstakes	A suspended jockey rides his horse Six-Shooter in a race in Tijuana.
1932	Men of Chance	"Diamond Johnny" Silk is double-crossed by his own wife at a Paris racetrack.
1934	Broadway Bill	Story of a man's love for his thoroughbred and a woman who helps him achieve his dreams.
1935	Racing Luck	After his horse Life Belt fails a drug test, a trainer is suspended.
1935	Hot Tip	Leadpipe looks like a cinch, but a tipster persuades a fellow to bet on a loser instead.
1936	Thoroughbred	A plot in Australia to kill favored Stormalong before the Melbourne Cup.
1936	Educated Evans	A wealthy couple ask a Cockney tipster to train their horse.
1936	Racing Blood	Jockey buys lame colt for under $5, turns him into a champion.
1936	Three Men on a Horse	Greeting-card writer Erwin Trowbridge has a knack for picking racetrack winners.
1936	Down the Stretch	Banned at home, rider Mickey Rooney moves to England to find success.
1936	All In	A broke bloke inherits a stable and sets out to win The Derby.
1936	Charlie Chan at the Race Track	The detective deduces it's murder after a trainer is killed by a horse.
1937	A Day at the Races	Marx Brothers in a horse-racing farce.
1937	You Can't Buy Luck	After his horse wins the Preakness, a gambler is charged with a murder.
1937	Saratoga	Bookie Clark Gable and thoroughbred owner Jean Harlow horse around at Saratoga.
1937	Racing Lady	Female trainer's filly Katydid is kidnapped before a big race at Santa Anita.
1937	Thoroughbreds Don't Cry	Judy Garland meets jockey Mickey Rooney in their first film together.
1937	Breezing Home	A bookie's girlfriend ends up owning Galaxy, entering him in a big California race.
1937	Wine, Women and Horses	A gambler wins $20,000 on his horse, but it costs him his wife.
1937	Off to the Races	Jimmy B must win the county fair's big harness race to get his owner out of jail.
1938	Kentucky	A Civil War family feud continues 75 years later for a Derby horse owner (Loretta Young).
1938	Going Places	Sporting goods salesman Dick Powell pretends to be a jockey.
1938	Stablemates	A drunken vet (Wallace Beery) influences a young jockey (Mickey Rooney).
1938	Straight, Place and Show	The Ritz Brothers get involved with a singer (Ethel Merman) and a horse called Playboy.
1939	Trouble Brewing	Light-hearted adventure of a racetrack gambler paid off in counterfeit cash.
1939	Two Thoroughbreds	A boy isn't sure whether to return or raise a stable's valuable missing foal.
1939	The Day the Bookies Wept	Hiccup can't win until Betty Grable discovers the horse runs better on beer.
1939	Flying Fifty-Five	British film about the life of a jockey.
1939	Long Shot	Certified Check has an outside shot to win a big race at Santa Anita.
1939	King of the Turf	A former trainer turned alcoholic meets a kid who helps him recover.
1939	The Lady's from Kentucky	A bookie (George Raft) and a lady end up co-owning a horse.
1939	Seabiscuit (The Lost Documentary)	Original documentary about the great racehorse made in 1939 by owner Charles S. Howard.
1939	Pride of the Blue Grass	A young jockey enters a blind colt in a Grand National steeplechase race.
1940	Maryland	A young man decides to ride in a Maryland race over his mother's objections.
1940	He Married His Wife	Joel McCrea has big problems with his horse Ajax and his ex-wife.
1940	Sporting Blood	Robert Young risks everything on a race in Virginia.
1941	Ride, Kelly, Ride	Injured jockey Corn Cob Kelly decides to ride after learning a race is fixed.
1941	Golden Hoofs	A girl (Jane Withers) enters her trotter Yankee Doodle in the "Hiatoga Stakes."
1943	It Ain't Hay	Abbott and Costello mistakenly steal the race horse Tea Biscuit.
1944	National Velvet	A young Elizabeth Taylor bonds with the steeplechase horse she loves.
1944	Home in Indiana	A former sulky driver (Walter Brennan) gives his nephew lessons in harness racing.
1944	The Hundred Pound Window	Clerk (Richard Attenborough) at a big-wager window ends up owing a big debt.
1944	Thoroughbreds	An ex-Cavalry sergeant trains his old mount to win a steeplechase race.
1945	She Went to the Races	Ava Gardner in a rom-com about scientists betting on horse races.
1945	Salty O'Rourke	A crooked jockey tries to double-cross a racetrack gambler (Alan Ladd).
1946	The Bride Wore Boots	Barbara Stanwyck enters her horse Albert in a Virginia steeplechase race.
1947	That's My Man	Everything's riding on Don Ameche's colt Gallant Man, including his marriage.
1947	My Brother Talks to Horses	Lewie Penrose's brother (Peter Lawford) has everything riding on the Preakness.
1947	The Homestretch	Maureen O'Hara's horse ends up entered in a big race against her husband's.
1948	Green Grass of Wyoming	The past owners of Flicka and Thunderhead take their trotter Crown Jewel to a race in Ohio.
1948	Heart of Virginia	The jockey of Virginia's Pride quits after accidentally causing a death on the track.
1948	The Return of October	Horse trainer Uncle Willie is reincarnated as a Derby horse called October.
1948	Racing Luck	Two women enter horses in a race, wagering that whoever wins will own both.
1948	The Winner's Circle	A young girl is heartbroken when she's forced to sell her colt, Teacher's Pet.
1949	The Great Dan Patch	Based on true story of the famous turn-of-the-century trotter.
1949	The Story of Seabiscuit	A partly fictionalized account of Seabiscuit's success, starring Shirley Temple.
1949	The Rocking Horse Winner	British tale about a boy with a knack for picking racetrack winners.
1950	County Fair	Rory Calhoun thwarts crooks trying to fix a race.
1950	Riding High	Bing Crosby in a racetrack tale directed by Frank Capra.
1950	Under My Skin	A jockey (John Garfield) races in Europe, is pursued by a mobster.
1950	Blue Grass of Kentucky	A horse called Blue Grass wins the Derby, but his bloodline causes a controversy.
1951	The Galloping Major	Exploits of gamblers at an England race course.
1951	Crazy Over Horses	The Bowery Boys run their filly My Girl against the mob's horse Tarzana.
1951	Pride of Maryland	After being barred, trainer-rider Frankie Longworth redeems himself just in time.
1951	Francis Goes to the Races	Donald O'Connor and his talking mule get mixed up in a crooked horse race.
1951	Two-Dollar Bettor	A novice gets in way over his head wagering on races.
1952	Boots Malone	A sports agent (William Holden) takes a jockey under his wing.
1952	Derby Day	A day at Epsom Downs for the running of the Darby.
1952	A Girl in Every Port	Two sailors (Groucho Marx and William Bendix) are conned into buying a lame race-horse.
1953	Born to the Saddle	Outlaws try to keep Blue Chip from winning a big quarterhorse race.
1953	Fast Company	Gay Fleet's owner (Polly Bergen) falls for a fellow who fixes horse races.
1953	Money from Home	Martin and Lewis end up in a Maryland horse race.
1954	Pride of the Blue Grass	Gypsy Prince and attractive owner interest a trainer (Lloyd Bridges).
1955	The Fighting Chance	A scheming woman (Julie London) causes friction between a trainer and jockey.
1955	The Phantom Horse	Japanese movie loosely based on Tokino Minoru's racing career
1956	Glory	Margaret O'Brien wants to run her filly in the Kentucky Derby.
1957	Just My Luck	Fable of a British bloke whose one-pound wager at the track could win him sixteen thousand.
1957	April Love	In Kentucky, a wayward youth (Pat Boone) trains a sulky racehorse.
1975	Bite the Bullet	Cowboys compete in a 700-mile race. Co-starring Gene Hackman and James Coburn.
1976	Febbre da cavallo	Italian movie following a trio of gamblers who always bet the wrong horses.
1978	International Velvet	Tatum O'Neal in an updated version of the 1944 classic.
1978	Casey's Shadow	An aging New Mexico trainer (Walter Matthau) has a lot riding on a two-year-old colt.
1978	Run for the Roses	Vera Miles as the owner of a long-shot Derby contender.
1979	The Black Stallion	A boy and a horse are rescued from a desert isle, then become masked rider and "mystery horse" in a race.
1981	On the Right Track	A homeless child (Gary Coleman) has an uncanny knack for choosing winners.
1983	Champions	Based on the story of the winners of the 1981 Grand National—Aldaniti, who came back from chronic leg injuries, and jockey Bob Champion, a testicular cancer survivor. Starring John Hurt.
1983	Phar Lap	Australian film based on a true story of doomed Depression-era racehorse.
1983	The Black Stallion Returns	In sequel to 1979 story, a boy travels to Morocco to try to get his horse back.
1985	Sylvester	Wild horse is turned into competitive jumper by young woman (Melissa Gilbert).
1988	Hot to Trot	Bobcat Goldthwait and a talking horse.
1989	Let It Ride	A down-and-out racetrack gambler (Richard Dreyfuss) has the wildest day of his life.
1990	Kaaranama	Bollywood film about a horse trainer (Vinod Khanna) whose star horse poses a threat to millionaire punter (Amrish Puri) while also falling in love with his daughter (Kimi Katkar)
1994	Eden Valley	Story of a British harness-racing community.
1999	Shergar	True story of a champion Irish racehorse that mysteriously disappears.
2000	Ready to Run	Disney Channel family film on a 14-year-old girl who is an aspiring jockey.
2001	On the Nose	Dan Aykroyd wants a lucky charm that helps gambler Robbie Coltrane pick winners.
2002	Febbre da cavallo - La mandrakata	Sequel to Febbre da cavallo Mandrake and his new friends continue lose money betting on horses.
2003	Seabiscuit	Based on a true story, with Jeff Bridges as the great horse's owner and Tobey Maguire as his jockey. Nominated for 7 Academy Awards.
2004	Hidalgo	Based on true story of a 19th-century Arabian distance race, starring Viggo Mortensen.
2005	The Derby Stallion	A 15 year old convinces his father to allow him to train for the Derby Cup.
2005	Dreamer	Family film with Kurt Russell and Dakota Fanning owning an injured thoroughbred.
2005	Racing Stripes	A zebra tries to win a race against horses in Kentucky.
2006	Lump of Sugar	Korean film starring Im Soo-jung as a girl who wants to follow in her late mother's footsteps and become a jockey against the wishes of her father while forming a bond with an orphaned colt.
2007	Ruffian	Made for TV; based on a true story of tragic ending of undefeated filly.
2008	Race	Bollywood story.
2010	Secretariat	Based on a true story, with Diane Lane as the Triple Crown winner's owner.
2011	Shannon's Rainbow	A teen girl finds a race horse, plus a mother she never knew.
2011	Charismatic	Made for TV in ESPN's 30 for 30 series. Charismatic and jockey Chris Antley in 1999 Triple Crown races.
2011	The Cup	Australian film about Damien Oliver, the jockey who rode Media Puzzle to victory in the 2002 Melbourne Cup.
2014	50 to 1	Based on the story of Mine That Bird, the 50-1 shot that won the 2009 Kentucky Derby.
2017	Lean On Pete	A 15-year-old boy befriends an aging racehorse named Lean On Pete. When he finds out that he can no longer race is going to be sent to slaughter they search for a new home.
2018	Bizim İçin Şampiyon (Champion)	Turkish film about jockey Halis Karataş and Triple Crown winner Bold Pilot as they inspire hope in Turkey during the 1990s.
2018	Kiwi	Made for TV: based on a true story about Kiwi a NZ$1000 purchase who won the 1983 Melbourne Cup
2019	Ride Like a Girl	Australian film about Michelle Payne, the jockey who rode Prince of Penzance to victory in the 2015 Melbourne Cup.
2021	Dream Horse	Welsh film about Dream Alliance, who won the Welsh Grand National in 2009.
2021	Jockey	American film about an aging jockey named Jackson Silva whose health begins to deteriorate after decades of riding.
2022	Tempête	French Canadian film told over the course of 17 years following a girl named Zoe who dreamed of being a jockey but is paralysed after a traumatic horse accident.
2024	Umamusume: Pretty Derby – Beginning of a New Era	Japanese film that is part of the Umamusume: Pretty Derby franchise and follows the anthropomorphic representations of Jungle Pocket, Agnes Tachyon, Manhattan Cafe, and Dantsu Flame in events based on the 2001 Classic races.
2024	Kill the Jockey	Argentine film about a star jockey who accidentally kills a prized racehorse and is now on the run from the mob.

== Highest grossing films about horse racing ==
The following is a list of horse racing films that surpassed $1 million.

46% of the films were released after 1950. 2005 is the most frequent year with two films on the list. All had a theatrical run (including re-releases) after 1937. Films that have not played since then do not appear on the chart due to ticket price inflation, population size, and ticket purchasing trends not being considered.

Highest grossing films about horse racing
Rank	Film	Box office	Year	Ref.
1	Seabiscuit	$148,336,445	2003	
2	Hidalgo	$108,040,622	2004	
3	Racing Stripes	$90,754,475	2005	
4	Secretariat	$60,321,861	2010	
5	Dreamer	$38,741,732	2005	
6	The Black Stallion	$37,799,643	1979	
7	The Black Stallion Returns	$12,049,514	1983	
8	Bite the Bullet	$11,000,000	1975	
9	Umamusume: Pretty Derby – Beginning of a New Era	$9,921,113	2024	
10	Ride Like a Girl	$9,545,647	2019	
11	Casey's Shadow	$8,000,000	1978	
12	International Velvet	$7,009,238	1978	
13	Dream Horse	$6,572,790	2020	
14	Hot to Trot	$6,436,211	1988	
15	National Velvet	$5,840,000	1944	
16	Let It Ride	$4,973,285	1989	
17	April Love	$3,700,000	1957	
18	Money from Home	$3,500,000	1953	
19	Saratoga	$3,252,000	1937	
20	The Cup	$2,660,645	2011	
21	Lean on Pete	$2,443,584	2017	
22	The Homestretch	$2,350,000	1947	
23	Riding High	$2,350,000	1950	
24	A Day at the Races	$2,305,000	1937	
25	Francis Goes to the Races	$2,300,000	1951	
26	Green Grass of Wyoming	$2,100,000	1948	
27	Home in Indiana	$1,750,000	1944	
28	It Ain't Hay	$1,600,000	1943	
29	50 to 1	$1,064,454	2014	

== See also ==
- List of films about horses
- List of highest grossing sports films
- List of sports films
