= Sporting Blood =

Sporting Blood may refer to:

- Sporting Blood (1931 film)
- Sporting Blood (1940 film)
- Sporting Blood, a race horse that won the 1921 Travers Stakes under suspicious circumstances, owned by Arnold Rothstein
