= John Larkin (actor, born 1877) =

American actor

John Larkins
- Born: John Larkins; November 25, 1877; Willmington, North Carolina, NC
- Died: March 18, 1936 (aged 58); Los Angeles, California, U.S.
- Resting place: Evergreen Cemetery, Los Angeles, California
- Other names: "Jolly" John Larkins, John Larkins, Johnny Larkins
- Occupation: actor
- Years active: c. 1898–1936
- Partner(s): Ida Summerville, Elsie Morris, Mary Prudence Larkins
- Parent(s): Samuel Cudjo Larkins and Emeline Moore

John Larkins (born November 25, 1877 – March 18, 1936) was an American stage and screen performer, as well as songwriter, whose acting career extended nearly four decades – from the late 1890s through his last acting roles in the five films released the year of his death. A scrapbook preserved at Atlanta's Emory University indicates that "he was billed as "The Rajah of Mirth" and "The Funniest Colored Comedian in the World".

== Overview ==
Larkins was seen in minstrel shows, vaudeville and, during his final six years, at the start of the sound film era, in major Hollywood studio productions, accumulating nearly 50 film credits between 1930 and 1936.

Over half of his film appearances were uncredited and, stable with casting mores prevalent during the era, his roles consisted of shoeshine men, servants, porters, janitors, stablehands and slaves. He was, however, continually employed, averaging from six to eleven films per year. A story in a 1933 issue of the Los Angeles-based African-American newspaper, California Eagle, stated that he "is reported to be the highest paid Negro actor in Hollywood".

== Comedy and musical performer starting in 1898 ==
Larkin first performed as a professional entertainer during the last years of the 19th century. The Internet Movie Database lists his year of birth as 1877 and his birthplace as Wilmington, North Carolina, while the Emory University archives, which bought his scrapbook in 2000, indicate the birth year as 1882 and the place of birth as Norfolk, Virginia.

In 1898, under the stage name "Jolly" John Larkins, he and his wife, singer-dancer Ida Larkins, toured with the Champion Cake Walkers Co. and, in 1900, with Boom's Black Diamond Co., where he was both stage manager and principal comedy performer. His wife left the show in 1901 and Larkin revised the act as Larkins & Patterson, with performing partner Dora Patterson with whom he starred, during 1902–03, in the musical A Trip to the Jungles, with the 1904 edition directed by W. C. Craine. In 1902 he also joined, on a part-time basis, the African American musical and acrobatic performing troupe, Black Patti Troubadours, singing and writing songs for the troupe's acts. Sheet music held by the Library of Congress depicts the cover, with Larkin's smiling face, of one such song from 1907, "A Royal Coon", published in Chicago by Will Rossiter.

Larkin's biographical entry (as John Larkins) at Library of Congress describes him as "a minor figure in black music in the early part of the 20th century" who "ran "Jolly" John Larkin's Company and employed James Reese Europe as its musical director from 1906 to 1907". The entry also indicates that "in 1910 he produced and starred in A Trip to Africa" and that "his other credits include Royal Sam (1911) and Deep Central (1932)". In 1908, A Trip to the Jungles was revised as a vehicle for Matilda Sissieretta Joyner Jones, whose stage name was "Black Patti". Renamed A Trip to Africa, the show played from 1908 to 1911 with Larkin as the star comedy performer.

For a decade or longer, during periods when the Black Patti Troubadours did not perform, Larkin organized tours of his own performing troupe, the "Jolly" John Larkins Co., also billed as the "Jolly" John Larkins Musical Comedy Co, which had irregularly scheduled shows during various periods from about 1905 to about 1917. As in the case of James Reese Europe in 1906–07, Larkin's show Royal Sam, which toured during the 1911–12 season, employed as music director another African American composer who gained historical renown, H. Lawrence Freeman.

== Leader of minstrel shows from the late 1910s through the 1920s ==
As America entered World War I in 1917, Larkin, at the age of 40, assumed the leadership of the long-established touring group Dandy Dixie Minstrels which had performed, on a number of earlier occasions, with the Black Patti players. In 1919, about a year after the Armistice of 11 November 1918 and, over the following ten years, Larkin took the group on a number of world tours which included performances in London and other European cities, China, South Africa, Australia and New Zealand. John Larkin married Elsie Levine Morris on 15 September 1920 at the St Peters Church East Sydney. His age was listed as 37. Elsie Morris was herself a vaudeville actress from an early age and had performed in India and in many states of Australia. The marriage was an unhappy one with Larkin gambling large amounts of money which caused disharmony. In March 1923 John left Elsie. Elsie never heard from him again. In 1928 Elsie was granted a divorce for desertion. While in Australia, he also established a relationship with costume designer Rachel "Rae" Anderson and they became the parents of two daughters, Olga, born in 1919 and Joan, born in 1924. In 2019 DNA matching showed Larkin had also fathered a son Alan, in 1920 in Melbourne.

== Film career (1930–36) ==
In the wake of the Wall Street crash of 1929, acting companies struggled to survive and, while touring in Southern California during 1930, Larkin, now in his early fifties, was cast in his first film, Man to Man, released by Warner Bros on December 6, 1930. His stage name, appearing at the bottom of the cast list, was Johnny Larkins, but by the time of his second feature, MGM's The Prodigal, released the following February, the credited name, still billed at the bottom of the list, had been revised to "John Larkin", a form which would continue for the remaining five years of his life.

Unlike his contemporaries, Stepin Fetchit, who was used primarily as comedy relief, or Bill "Bojangles" Robinson, whose scenes were mainly focused on singing and dancing, Larkin was given few opportunities to display his skills as singer, dancer or as a comedian and was employed for the most part as a character actor. Also, in contrast to the star billing he received during the years he was a theatrical headliner, his film credits usually placed him at the bottom of the cast list or omitted his name altogether. The extent, however, to which his name and reputation was valued in the entertainment industry may be judged by the article which appeared in a March 1933 issue of California Eagle in conjunction with the release of MGM's Gabriel Over the White House, one of the eight features in which Larkin had parts that year. Although his role as Sebastian, the president's valet was uncredited, the Eagle ran a story, "Hollywood Respects Larkin as Real Star of the Film", alongside a photograph with a caption, "High Pay Man", stating that he was earning a greater salary that any other black performer in film.

Between 1931 and his death in March 1936, Larkin appeared in at least 45 films for nearly every studio in Hollywood which, in addition to Warners and MGM, included RKO (1931's Men of Chance, 1933's The Great Jasper), Paramount (1934's The Witching Hour), Universal (1935's A Notorious Gentleman) and Republic (1936's Frankie and Johnny).

== Death ==
John Larkin died in Los Angeles from a cerebral hemorrhage. The first of the 1936 productions in which he was featured, The Trail of the Lonesome Pine, premiered on March 13, five days before his death, while four others – The Great Ziegfeld, Frankie and Johnny (which was filmed in 1934), Hearts Divided and The Green Pastures – were released posthumously.

Larkin's tombstone is at Los Angeles' Evergreen Cemetery which, unlike most other cemeteries, permitted the burial of African Americans and includes graves of such performers as Eddie "Rochester" Anderson, Louise Beavers and Matthew "Stymie" Beard, whose careers partially overlapped the period of Larkin's activity. The tombstone features a photograph of Larkin and the years 1882–1936, which would indicate his age as about 54 at the time of death. However, since programs indicate that he was performing with his wife as early as 1898, when he would have been 15 or 16, the year indicated by the Internet Movie Database appears to be the more likely one. Thus, his 58th birthday, four months before his death, would have been in November 1935.

== Filmography ==
- Man to Man (1930) as Bildad (film debut)
- The Prodigal (1931) as Andrew Jackson Jones
- Gold Dust Gertie (1931) as Black Waiter Aboard Yacht (uncredited)
- Smart Money (1931) as Snake Eyes – Porter (uncredited)
- Sporting Blood (1931) as Uncle Ben
- Alexander Hamilton (1931) as Zekial
- Men of Chance (1931) as Black Horse Handler (uncredited)
- Emma (1932) as Train Station Porter (uncredited)
- Union Depot (1932) as Porter with Ticket for Ruth (uncredited)
- The Wet Parade (1932) as Moses
- Lena Rivers (1932) as Lucifer 'Lucy' Jones
- So Big (1932) as Jeff, the Black Waiter (uncredited)
- The Tenderfoot (1932) as Depot Porter (uncredited)
- Street of Women (1932) as Waiter with Food at Skyscraper (uncredited)
- Love Is a Racket (1932) as Tod – Jimmy's Elevator Operator (uncredited)
- Stranger in Town (1932) as Jed (uncredited)
- Crooner (1932) as Men's Room Attendant (uncredited)
- Washington Merry-Go-Round (1932) as Train Conductor with Telegram (uncredited)
- Lawyer Man (1932) as Tony's Butler (uncredited)
- The Great Jasper (1933) as Chippy (uncredited)
- Gabriel Over the White House (1933) as Sebastian – Valet (uncredited)
- Black Beauty (1933) as Eph
- Bed of Roses (1933) as Black Man Meeting Released Prisoner (uncredited)
- This Day and Age (1933) as Shoeshine Man (uncredited)
- Stage Mother (1933) as The Porter (uncredited)
- Ann Vickers (1933) as Black Trusty (uncredited)
- Day of Reckoning (1933) as Abraham
- Bedside (1934) as Train Porter (uncredited)
- Lazy River (1934) as Negro at Jockey Club (uncredited)
- The Witching Hour (1934) as Clarence – Brookfield's Butler (uncredited)
- The Thin Man (1934) as Porter (uncredited)
- Operator 13 (1934) as Slave Fishing for Codfish (uncredited)
- Kentucky Kernels (1934) as Jackson – Wakefield's Servant (uncredited)
- The Secret Bride (1934) as Janitor (uncredited)
- A Notorious Gentleman (1935) as Joshua
- Mississippi (1935) as Rumbo
- So Red the Rose (1935) as Cato's Companion (uncredited)
- Pursuit (1935) as Deacon (uncredited)
- Diamond Jim (1935) as Butler (uncredited)
- Broadway Hostess (1935) as Mose (uncredited)
- The Trail of the Lonesome Pine (1936) as Ebony
- The Great Ziegfeld (1936) as Sam (uncredited)
- Frankie and Johnny (1936) as Andy
- Hearts Divided (1936) as Isham
- The Green Pastures (1936) as Sexton (final film, uncredited)
