= Day of Reckoning (1933 film) =

1933 film

- Directed by: Charles Brabin
- Screenplay by: Zelda Sears; Eve Greene
- Based on: novel by Morris Lavine
- Produced by: Lucien Hubbard (assoc. producer)
- Starring: Richard Dix; Madge Evans; Conway Tearle
- Cinematography: Ted Tetzlaff
- Edited by: Adrienne Fazan
- Production company: Metro-Goldwyn-Mayer
- Distributed by: Metro-Goldwyn-Mayer
- Release date: October 27, 1933
- Running time: 65-70 minutes (7 reels)
- Country: United States
- Language: English

Day of Reckoning is a 1933 American pre-Code drama film starring Richard Dix, Madge Evans and Conway Tearle. It is based on a novel by Morris Lavine. When a man is sent to prison, his wife is romanced by another man.

== Plot ==
John Day is arrested for a shortage in his accounts at work. His wife Dorothy asks for help from lusting friend George Hollins, who orders John's lawyer to assure that John receives a two-year jail sentence.

== Cast ==
- Richard Dix as John Day
- Madge Evans as Dorothy Day
- Conway Tearle as George Hollins
- Una Merkel as Mamie
- Stuart Erwin as Jerry
- George McFarland as Johnny Day (as Spanky McFarlane)
- Isabel Jewell as Kate Lovett
- James Bell as Slim
- Raymond Hatton as Hart
- Paul Hurst as Harry
- John Larkin as Abraham
- Wilfred Lucas as Guard
- Samuel S. Hinds as O'Farrell
