= Frank Pullen =

British businessman

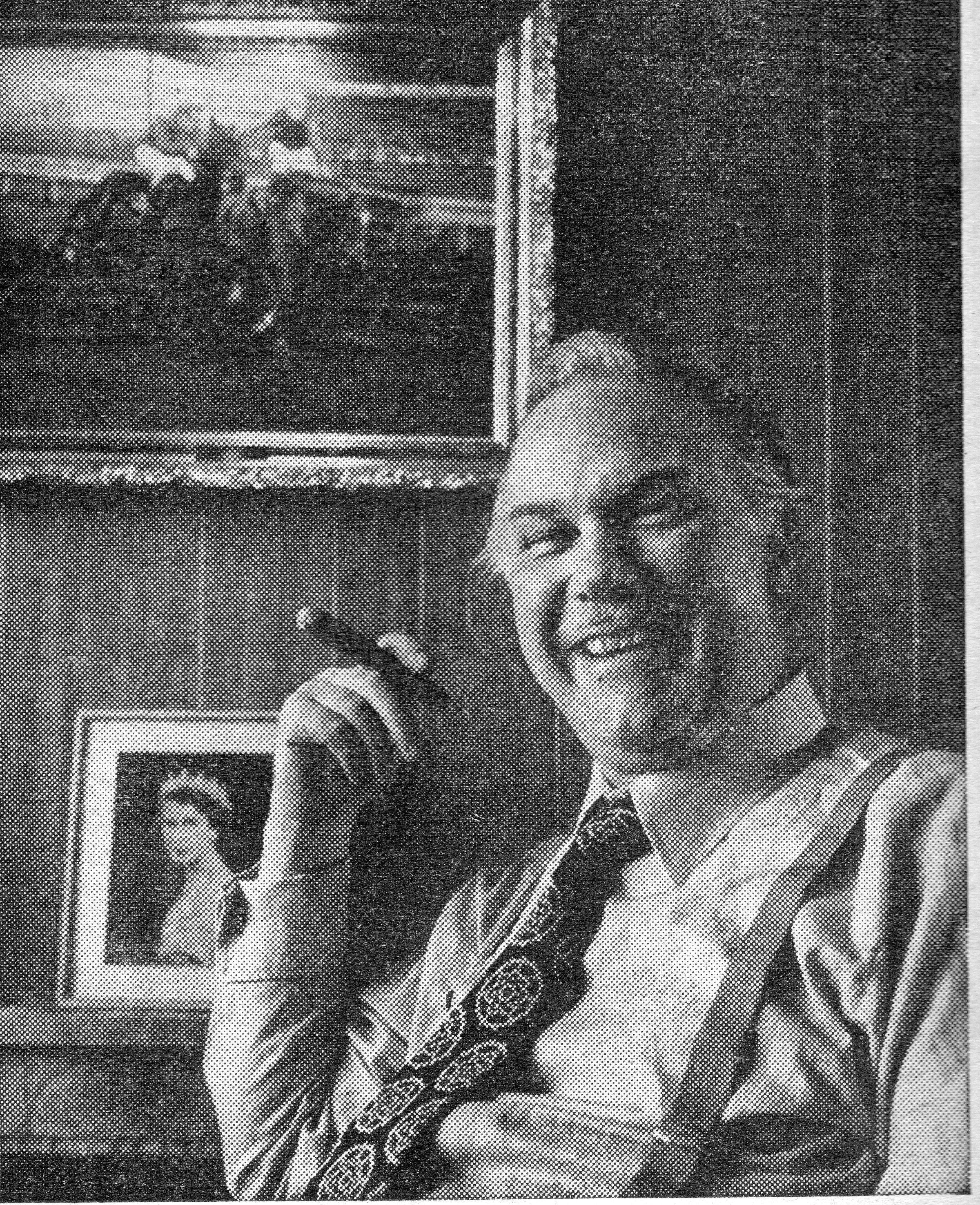
- Frank Pullen
- Born: 8 September 1915; London, England
- Died: 17 January 1992 (aged 76)
- Resting place: London Road Cemetery Bromley, London
- Occupations: Businessman: Property Developer; Racehorse owner/breeder

Francis Henry Pullen (8 September 1915 – 17 January 1992) was an English businessperson and racehorse owner.

== Early life ==
He was born, the youngest of four children, as Francis Henry Pullen (later also known by his initials FHP) to Arthur James and Alice Pullen (née Richards) at Catford, south London. His father died while serving with the Royal Marines during World War I and Alice Pullen worked as Laundress to raise her family. To help out, young Pullen found work feeding the local workhorses, earning a shilling a week, showing early entrepreneurial flair and sparking his love of horses. Pullen left school at 13, his first job being a cook in Woolworths tea rooms. Within a few years he rose to became a West End of London hotel chef

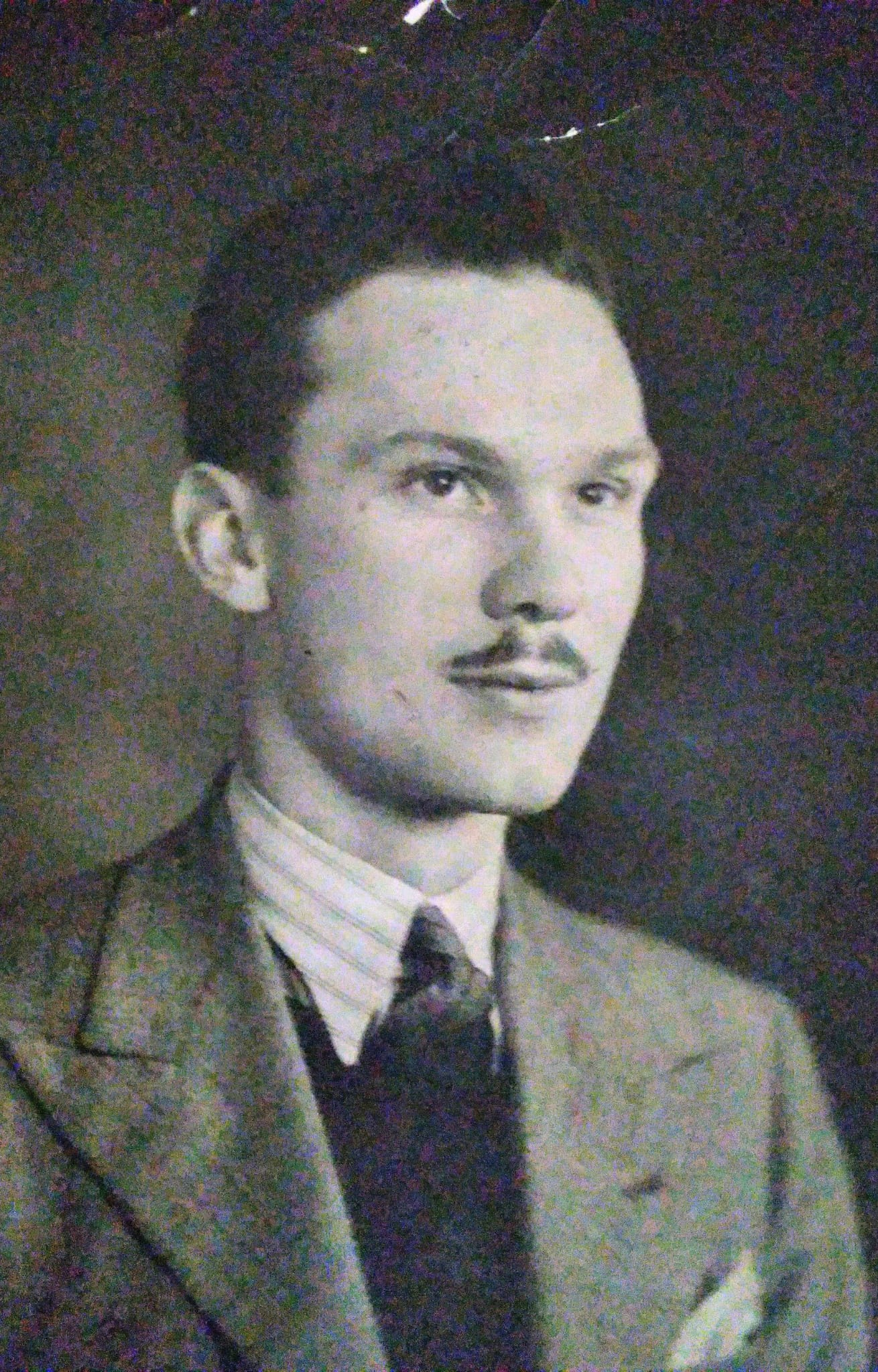
English businessman Frank Pullen 1933

== War years ==
Pullen enlisted in the British Army at the start of World War II and was one of the survivors of D-Day, landing at Gold Beach. Later during the conflict he helped liberate the Belgian town of Lessines. The grateful town gave him the freedom of the city and he later named three of his homes (one in Bromley, south London, one in Lee, South London and one in Looe, Cornwall, where he would holiday) in honour of this town.

== Pullen Shops ==
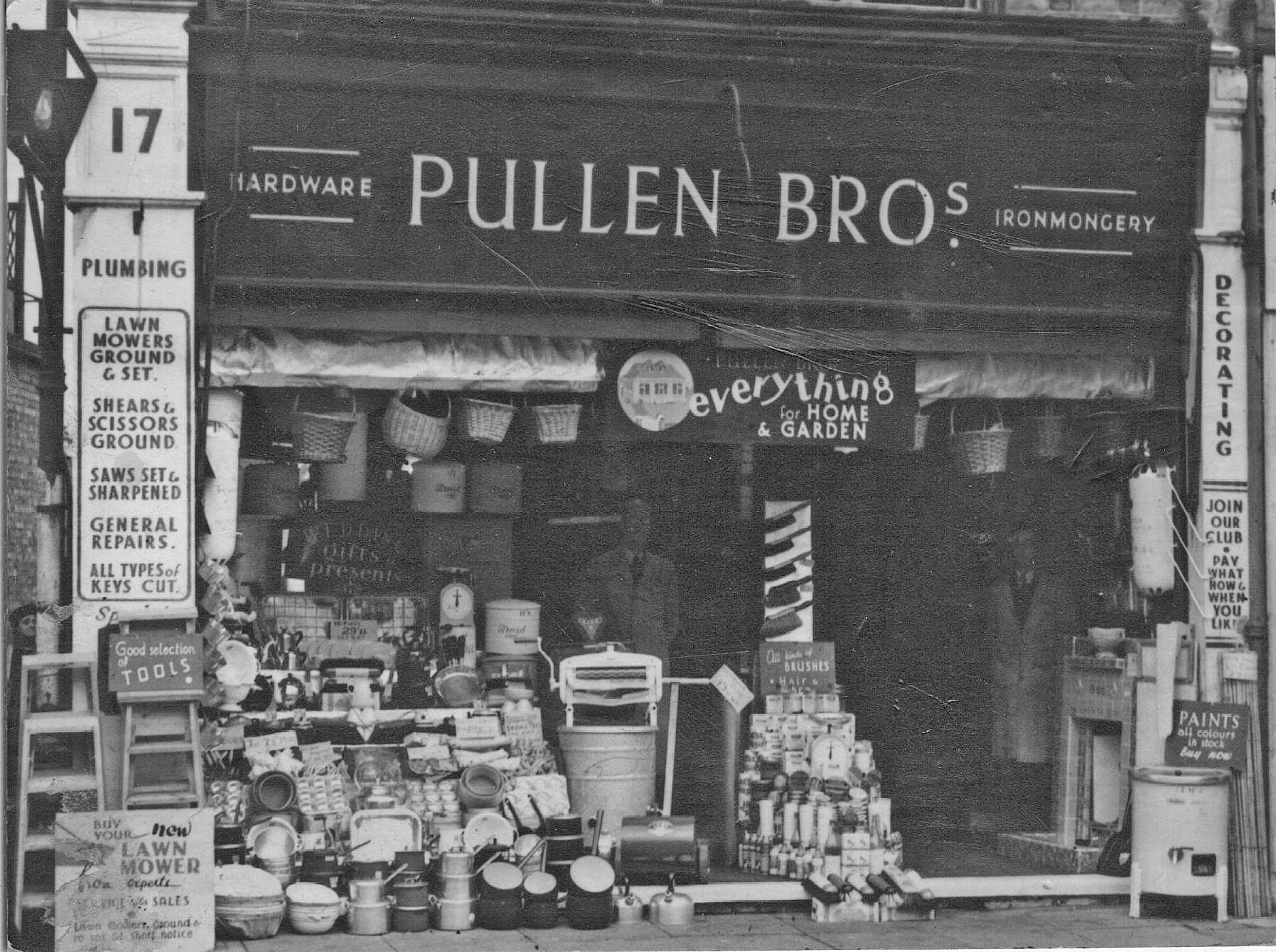
Pullen Brothers shop Catford Broadway circa 1945

After he was demobilised from the army in 1948, Pullen, along with his brothers Arthur and Albert, opened a series of general hardware shops, selling a wide range of products. These included his own brand of bleach "Pulbro", "Aladdin Pink" paraffin, wallpapers and paints, DIY and home appliances, cutlery and crockery, dustbins. He also held the concession to sell ice-creams at Lewisham Theatre on Catford Broadway. Pullen also specialised in the supply and fitment of his own brand of fireplaces . Branches covered south London, the first of these being on Catford Broadway. Pullen also owned and rented out many lock-up garages. Pullen became a millionaire and he enjoyed his wealth, and by July 1965 had bought his first new Rolls-Royce - Silver Cloud III Coupe from James Young, a luxury coachbuilder located in Bromley.

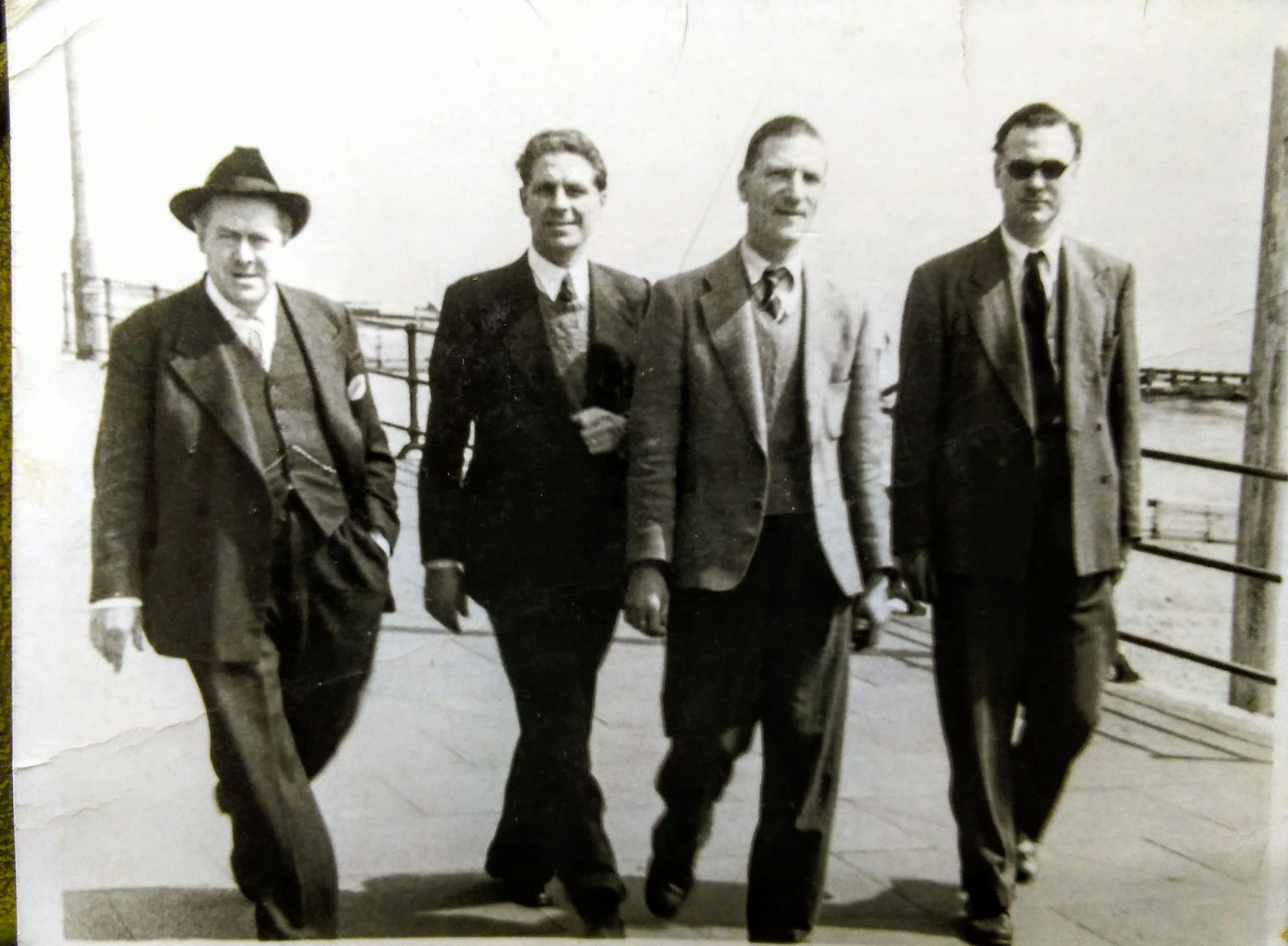
From right; Frank Pullen, Johnny Idale, Ted Mason and "Pinky" Floyd. Brighton sea front 1945

== Pullen Estates ==
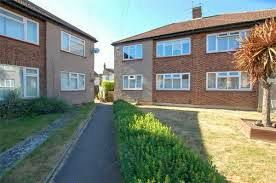
Karen Court, Blythe Road, Bromley 1955

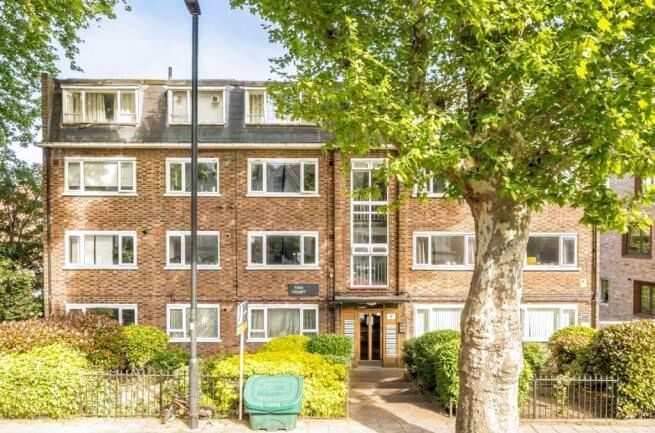
Tina court, Knollys road, Streatham 1962

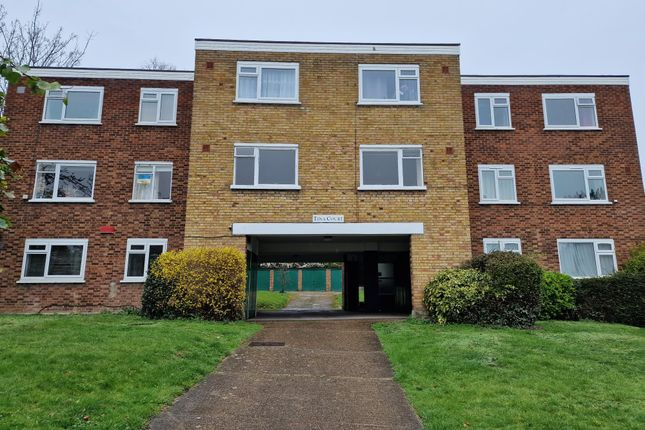
Tina Court, Ravensbourne Park crescent 1962

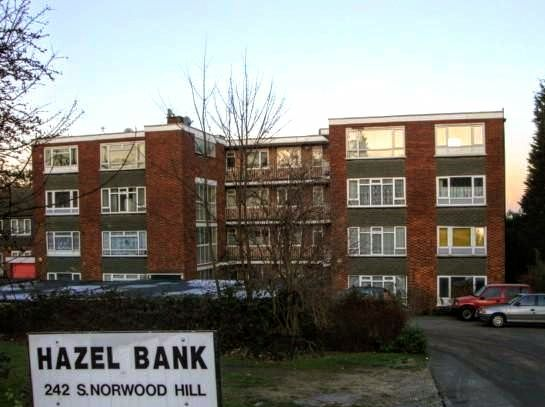
Hazel Bank 242 South Norwood Hill 1965

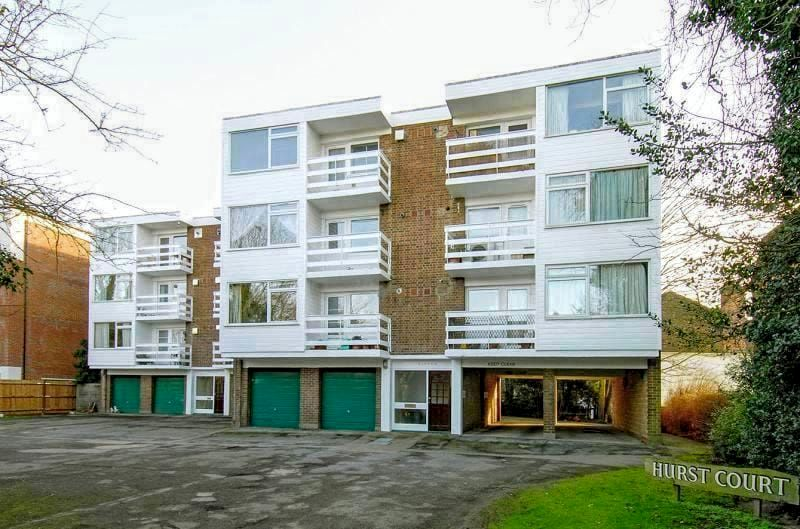
Hurst court, Southend Road, Beckenham 1966

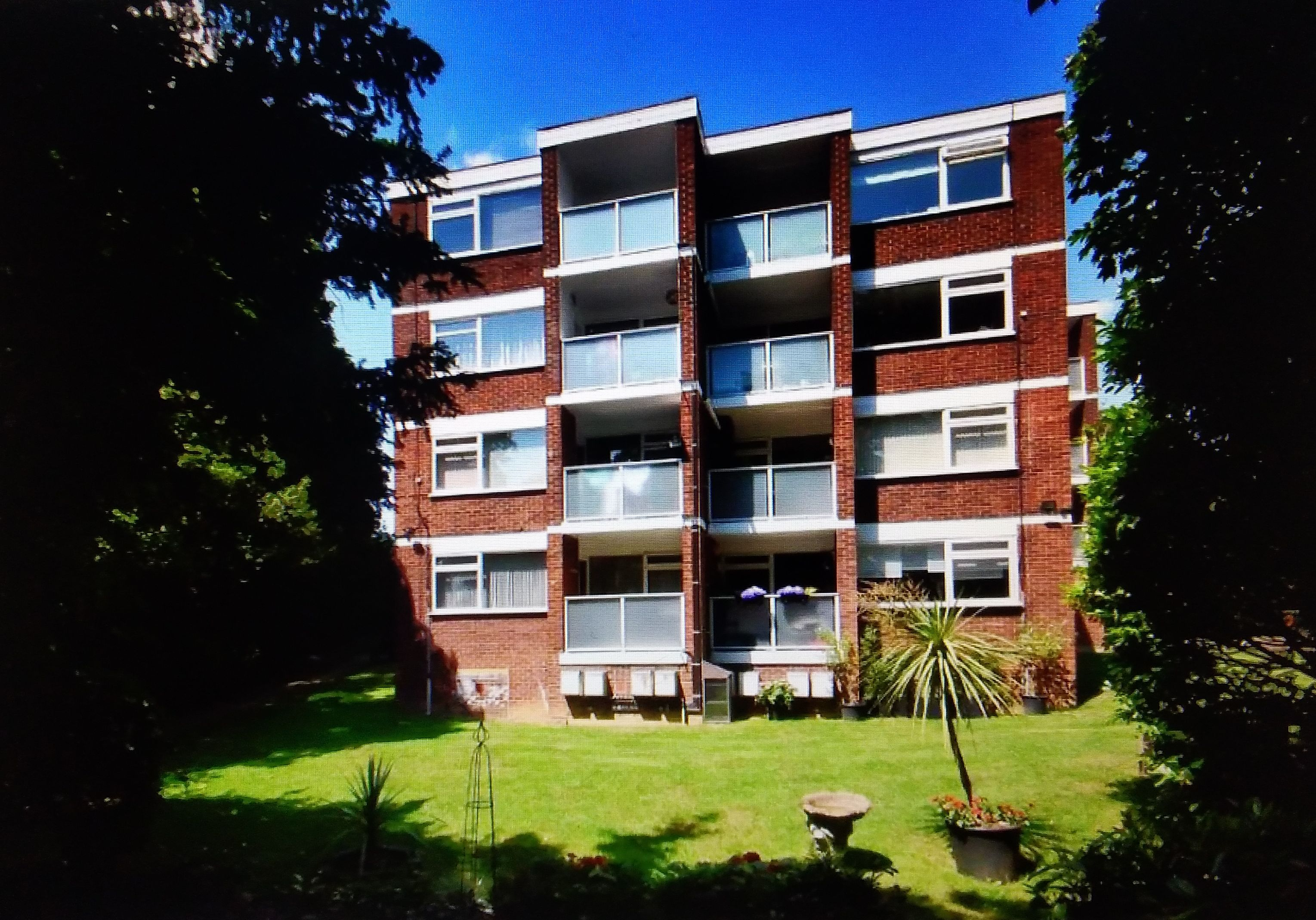
Escote Court Bromley 1968

Pullen started a business as a builder in a war-torn South London and became a member of the National House Building Council. Pullen became one of South London's leading property developers, and incorporated his business in 1962, using the slogan "We Build To Please" . Pullen specialised at first in renovating houses, before concentrating on new builds; his first being "Karen Court", Blyth Road, Bromley, a block of three maisonettes. Other early examples of Pullen's can be seen with Hazel Bank, South Norwood Hill and the bungalows of Clarence Road, Croydon. Pullen began the process of buying up old Victorian houses in south London, demolishing them and building blocks of flats, such as Tina Court, Knollys Road, Streatham and at Ravensbourne Park Crescent, Catford, along with Colin Court.

== Innovative Designs and Global Projects ==
Florida Court, Bromley 1972

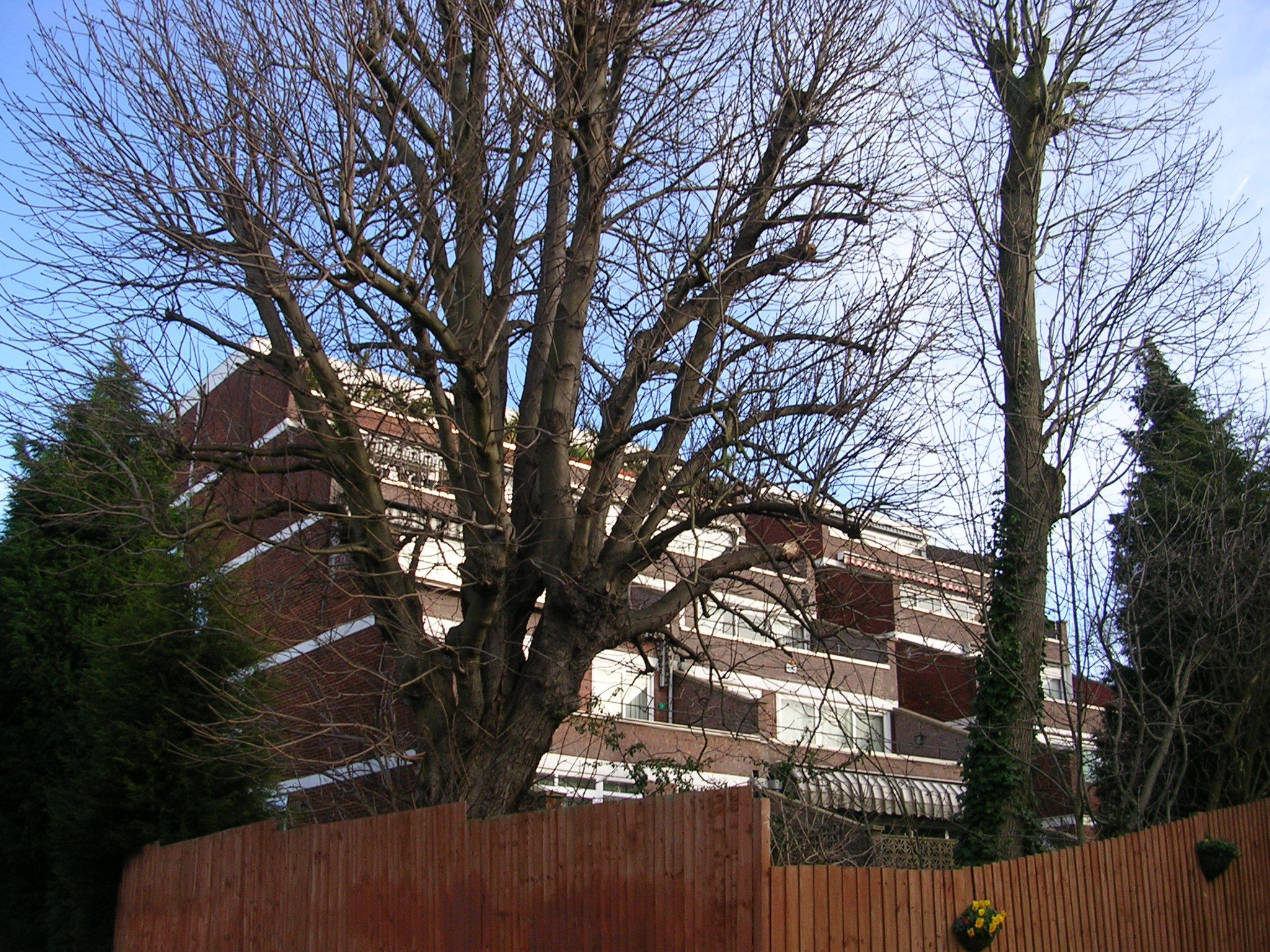
Tropicana, Beulah Hill 1973

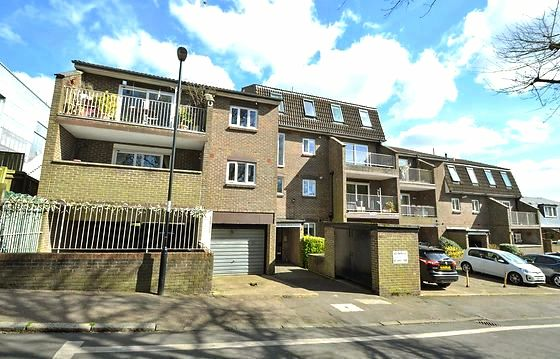
Wells Park Court, Taylors Lane, Sydenham 1984

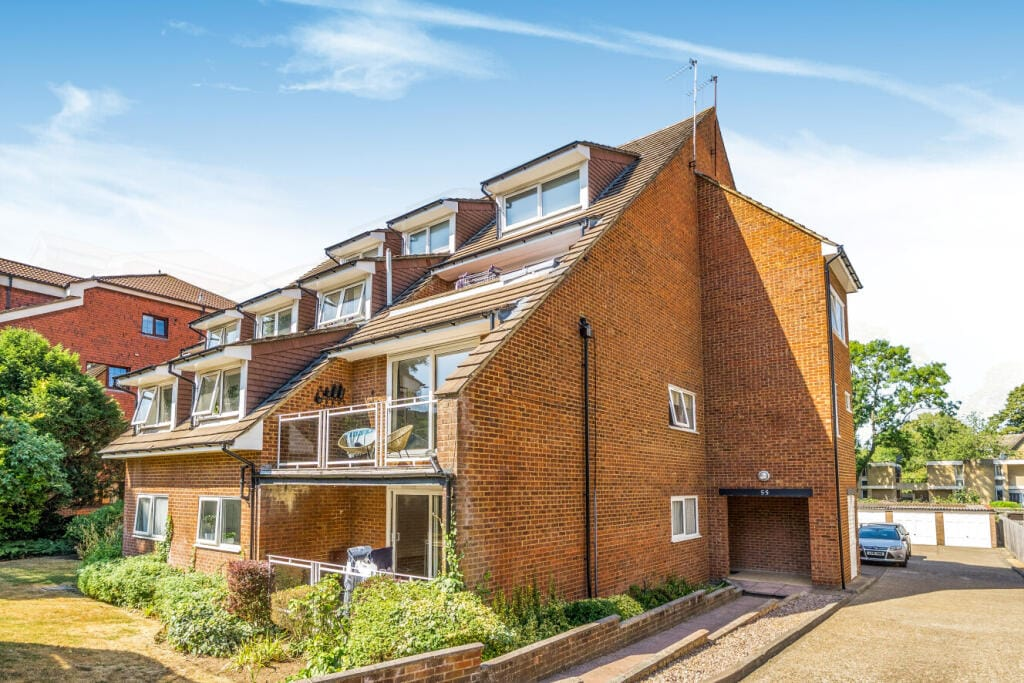
Monreaux court, Albemarle Road, Beckenham

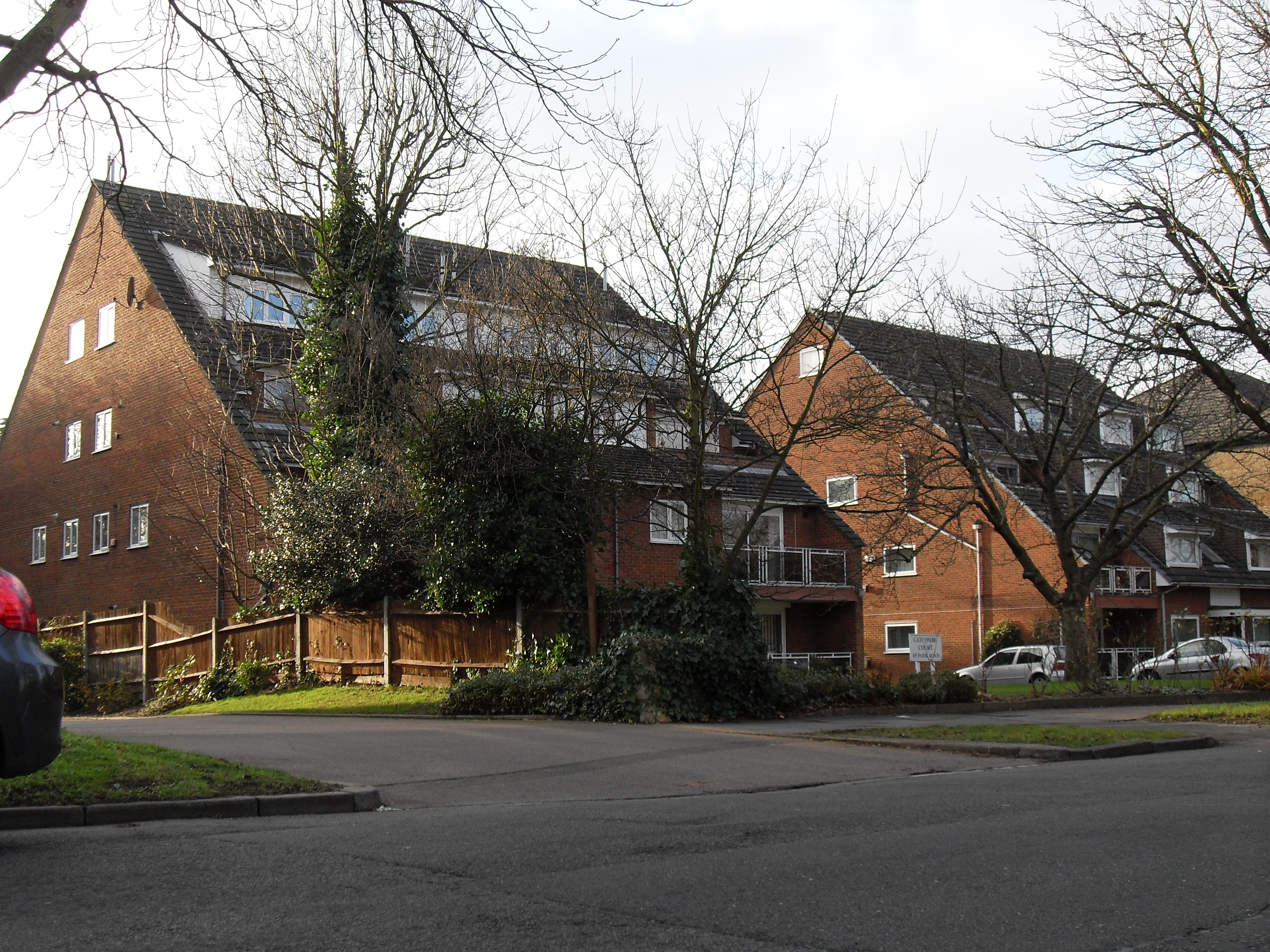
Gatcombe & Highgrove Courts, Beckenham 1984

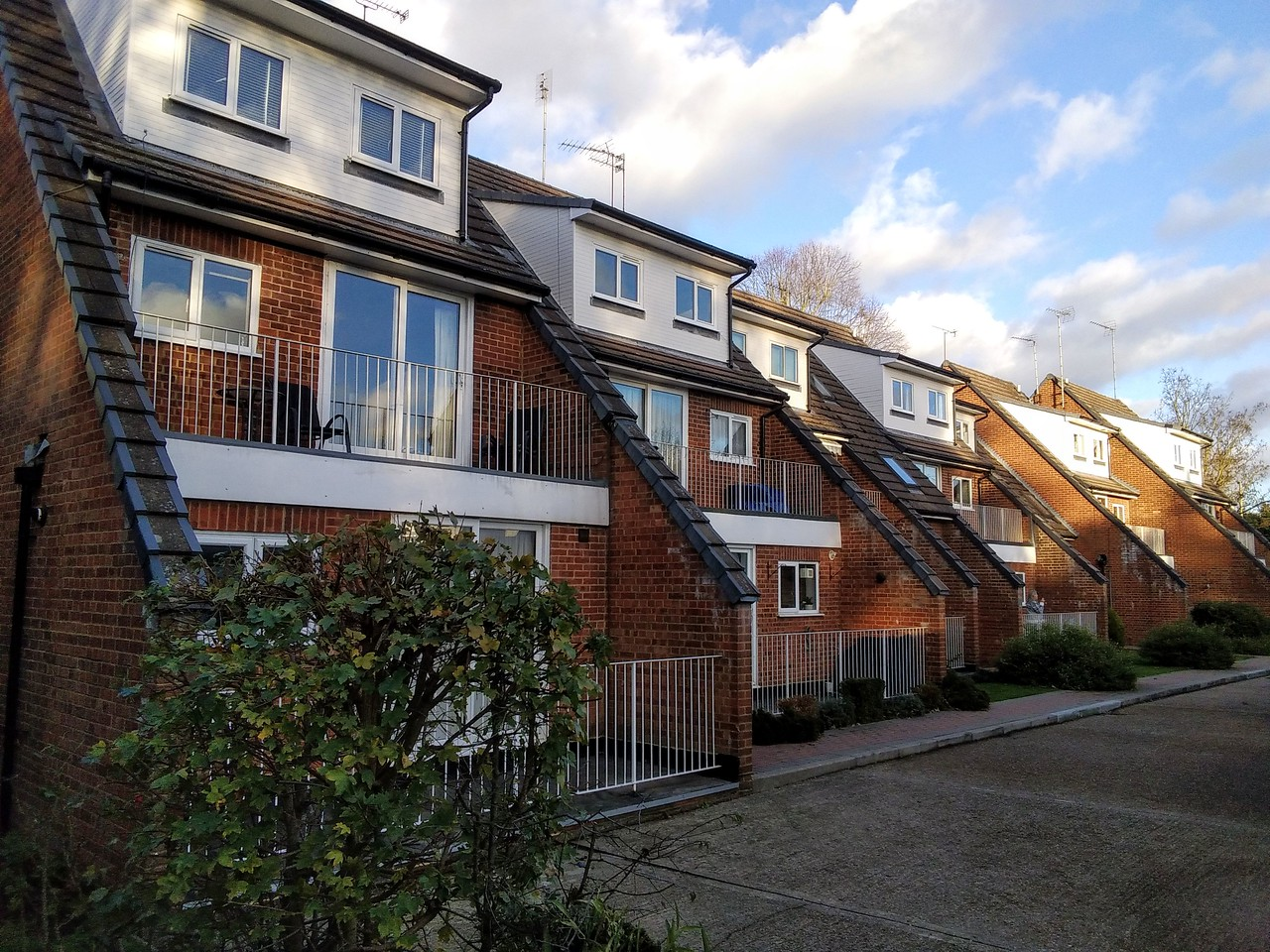
Chevening Court, Orpington 1985

Pullen moved on to housing estates, building over one hundred major developments. At Iona Close in Catford stands a type of Pullen's apartments that were purpose-built for Lewisham Council. In his later buildings, Pullen often employed the services of the architect and Le Corbusier admirer Joyce Lowman. Early examples Escote Court, Shortlands and Hurst Court Beckenham Pullen gained a reputation as a builder of innovative houses and luxury apartments, and examples of these buildings can be found at Florida Court in Bromley, with three blocks in a low-density, five-acre landscaped plot. At Beulah Hill Pullen built Tropicana, a groundbreaking block of flats to Lowmans design, climbing up Spurgeon Road with balconies having a grand view over southwest London. Seychelle Court and Montreux Court in Beckenham continued his theme of building courts with exotic names. Pullen also built the Parklands apartments (with roof gardens overlooking Kelsey Park), Parkwood court, Ingleside Close, Highgrove Court and Gatcombe Court again in Beckenham, the last three being the innovative "catslide" roof design, again by Joyce Lowman.

Pullen developed extensively down Wells Park road, Sydenham and with Chevening Court built the whole of Brasted Close in Orpington, Kent. This is one of Pullen's last estates, reviving his old practice of naming his structures after Royal Houses. Pullen was a frequent visitor to Kenya where he created a racing complex in Nairobi and embarked on an ambitious project there to build a township including schools and hospitals. Pullen went on to form Bromley Industrial Consultants, based in Pall Mall, London, with the purpose of helping developing nations

== Race horses ==
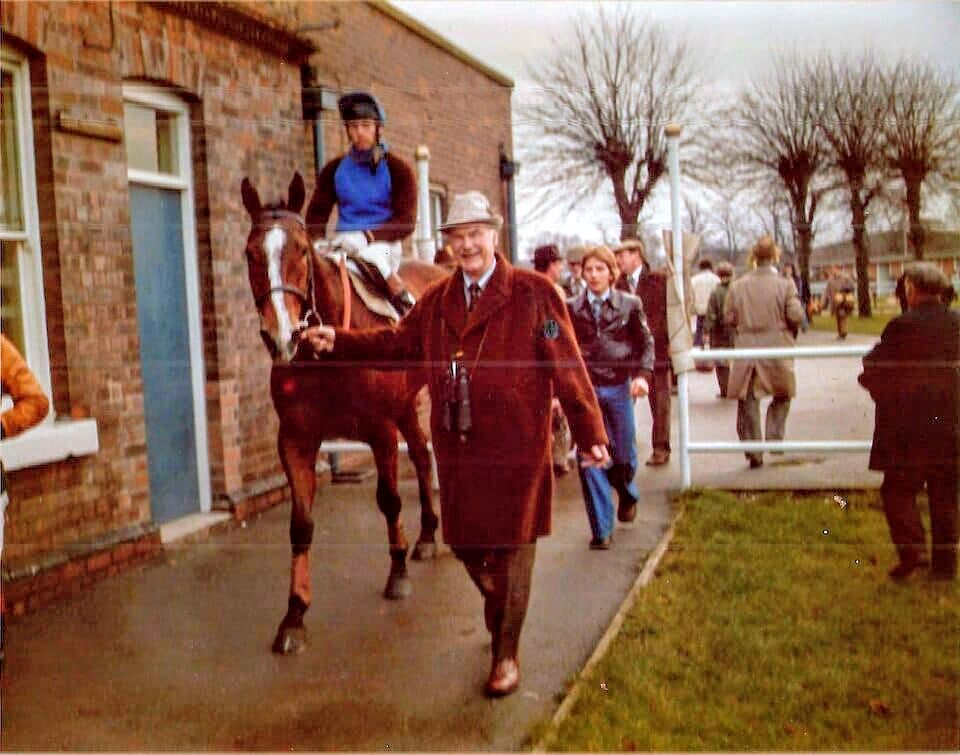
Frank H Pullen leading in horse, showing his racing silk colours of chocolate and blue

Pullen was also able to indulge in his lifelong passion of horse racing, training and breeding. He chose the colours Chocolate and Blue for his racing silks, to show his humble origins as these were the colours of his old school, Holmbeach Elementary Lewisham, where he left with no qualifications. His friends included Peter Bromley, racing commentator, and Dick Barton creator Ted Mason. Pullen went on to be a popular owner with a string of race horses. When Pullens favorite jockey Josh Gifford took up training in 1969, Pullen became his first owner at his yard in Findon, Sussex. He went on to having over 100 winners with him It was as such that he was interviewed by the Radio Times magazine ("Six owners in search of a winner" by Russell Twisk) in 1972, having especially bought "Fair Vulgan" on Josh Gifford's recommendation for that year's Grand National at Aintree. Former jockey Bob Champion bought racehorse "Just Martin" for Pullen. Pullen had built Champions yard and Pullen became Champions first owner when he took up training. Just Martin became Champions first winner as a trainer

== Personal life and death ==
Pullen married Annie Lily (known as Poppy) Rudd-Burrows in 1933 and they had 3 children, Maureen Josephine, Francis Arthur James (known as Frankie) and Colin Patrick. In 1953 he started a relationship with German emigre Erna Funk, and they went on to have two daughters Deirdre and Alice. Pullen formally retired in 1988 and he died, aged 76, at his livery yard in Orpington, Kent, and is buried at London Road Cemetery, Bromley. Racing enthusiast Queen Elizabeth the Queen Mother sent Frank's widow a letter of condolence upon hearing of his death.
