= George Agnew Chamberlain =

American novelist

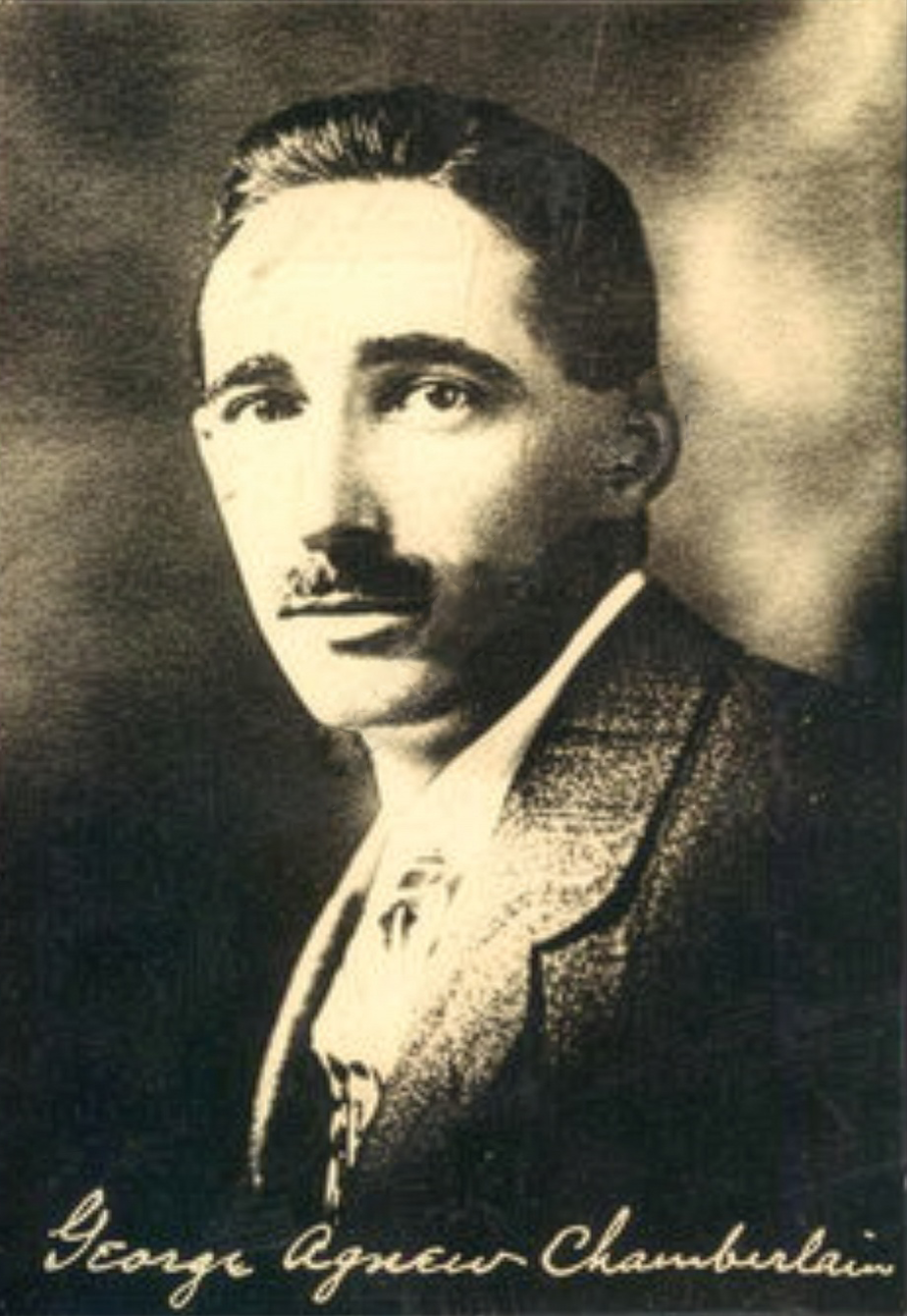
- Born: March 15, 1879; São Paulo, Brazil
- Died: March 4, 1966 (aged 86); Salem County, New Jersey, U.S.
- Occupation: Novelist
- Writing career
- Genres: Adventure fiction, romance novel, realistic fiction, western fiction

George Agnew Chamberlain (March 15, 1879 – March 4, 1966) was an American novelist and former diplomat. After leaving the diplomatic service, he became an author and published over 40 books, primarily during the 1910s and 1920s. Several of his novels, including The Phantom Filly, inspired films such as Home in Indiana and April Love.

Chamberlain led a private life, enjoying hobbies like golf and farming.

== Life and career ==
Chamberlain was born on March 15, 1879, in São Paulo, Brazil to missionary parents. Aged 18, he spent a summer living in a house on a hill in Litchfield County, Connecticut. The peaceful surroundings and its people left a lasting impression on him, making him feel it would always be his home. This experience would later inspire his first book, "Home", published in 1916 under a pseudonym. After graduating from Princeton University, he entered the diplomatic service where he spent sixteen years stationed in Europe, Africa and South America. He wrote a 70,000-word adventure novel in 1919 in around a month, while serving in Mexico as consul general. He left the service at the age of 38 to become an author.

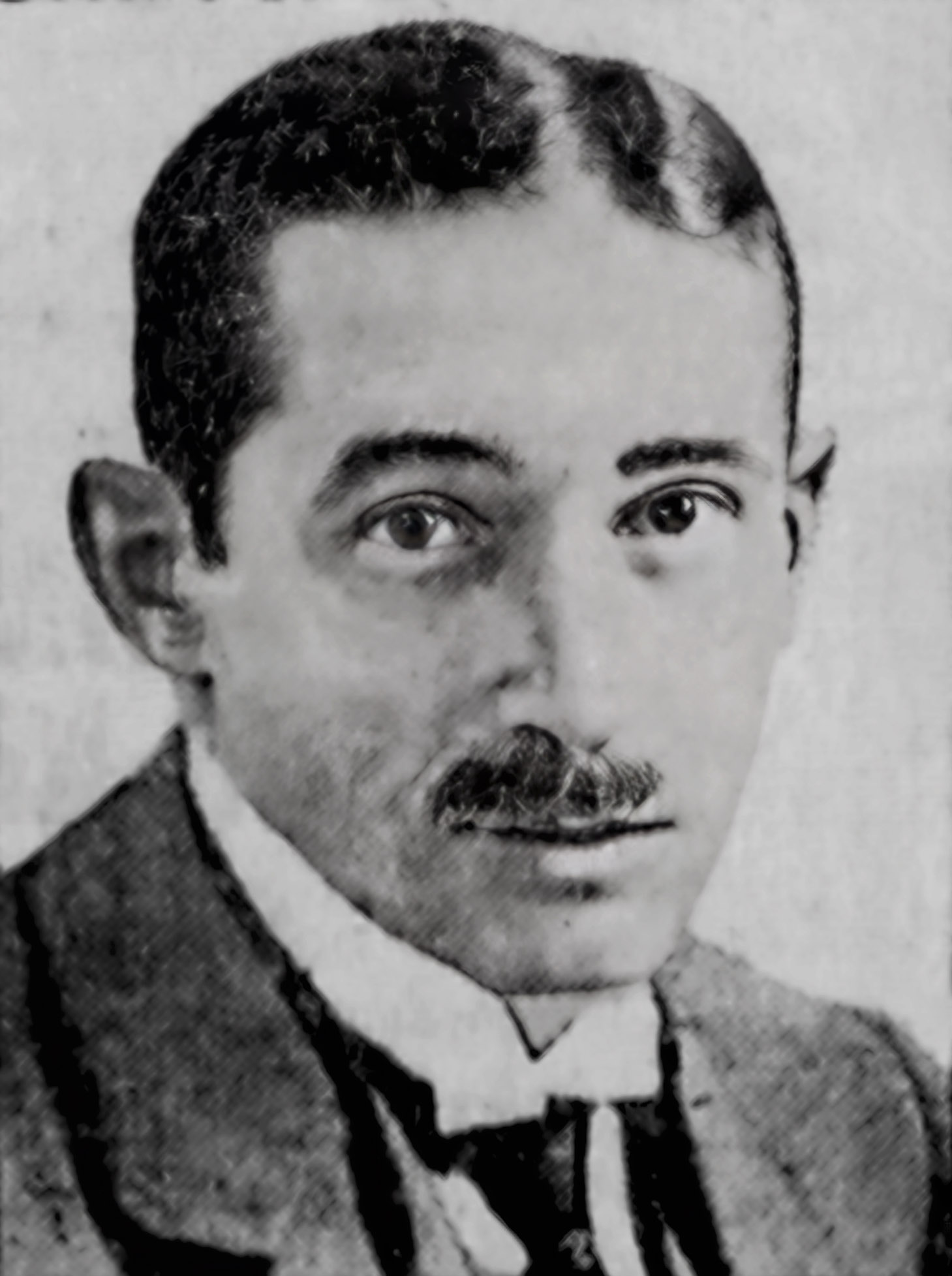
Chamberlain as published in The Denton Recorder, c.1921

After his service years, Chamberlain moved to a farm near Quinton Township in Salem County, New Jersey at Lloyd's Landing. While some considered the area's remote nature dull, Chamberlain disagreed, remarking, "This area is rugged and strong but not barren. It has its own romance and beauty, and it's the most truly American place I've ever known." Salem and nearby counties featured prominently in four of Chamberlain's novels, with Man Alone being his favorite. Other novels set in Southern New Jersey include Bull Tavern, Taken Boy and That Looks on Tempests.

He drew inspiration from a variety of sources, such as newspapers, interesting people and everyday events. He would often let an idea simmer for a year or two before using it, while confessing that some stories came to him 14 years before he wrote them.

His novel The Phantom Filly was the basis for two films, Home in Indiana (1944) and April Love (1957). Additionally, the 1948 film Scudda Hoo! Scudda Hay! was based on his novel by the same name. Over the course of his career, Chamberlain authored approximately 43 books, mostly during the 1910s and 1920s.

=== Writing style ===
Chamberlain believed in writing about familiar places from a distance to gain a better perspective. He stated that he typically spent about seven weeks of steady writing to complete a novel, followed by a four-month break. He believed it was impossible to produce two great works back-to-back due to writing fatigue. Chamberlain wrote his novels in longhand, finding it practical for moments of inspiration while traveling. He had a special writing chair that accompanied him wherever he went, noting "that chair goes wherever I go".

When asked in an interview if his characters were based on real people, Chamberlain replied that it was dangerous to use real individuals as this could lead to legal issues. Fictional characters, he felt, were a safer option.

== Personal life ==
Chamberlain enjoyed a variety of hobbies, including golf, bridge, dancing, hunting and driving a small roadster with his Belgian police dogs. He was known to always smoke a pipe. He hated the four years he spent in New York City, feeling confined in his apartment. His connection to Southern Jersey came from his love for the area, where he ran a productive farm, growing tomatoes, oats, and corn.

He was a longtime resident of Quinton Township, New Jersey, residing there for 38 years.

He died in March 1966, aged 86 at Salem County Memorial Hospital, following a period of declining health. While never marrying, he had a child named Georgette, born in France and whose existence was not revealed until the reading of his will.
