= Hearts Divided =

1936 film by Frank Borzage

- movie poster
- Directed by: Frank Borzage
- Written by: Laird Doyle; Casey Robinson
- Based on: Glorious Betsy; 1908 play by Rida Johnson Young
- Produced by: Frank Borzage; Marion Davies (uncredited)
- Starring: Marion Davies; Dick Powell; Charles Ruggles
- Cinematography: George J. Folsey
- Edited by: William Holmes
- Music by: Erich Wolfgang Korngold
- Production company: Warner Bros. Pictures
- Distributed by: Warner Bros. Pictures
- Release date: June 20, 1936
- Running time: 87 minutes
- Country: United States
- Language: English

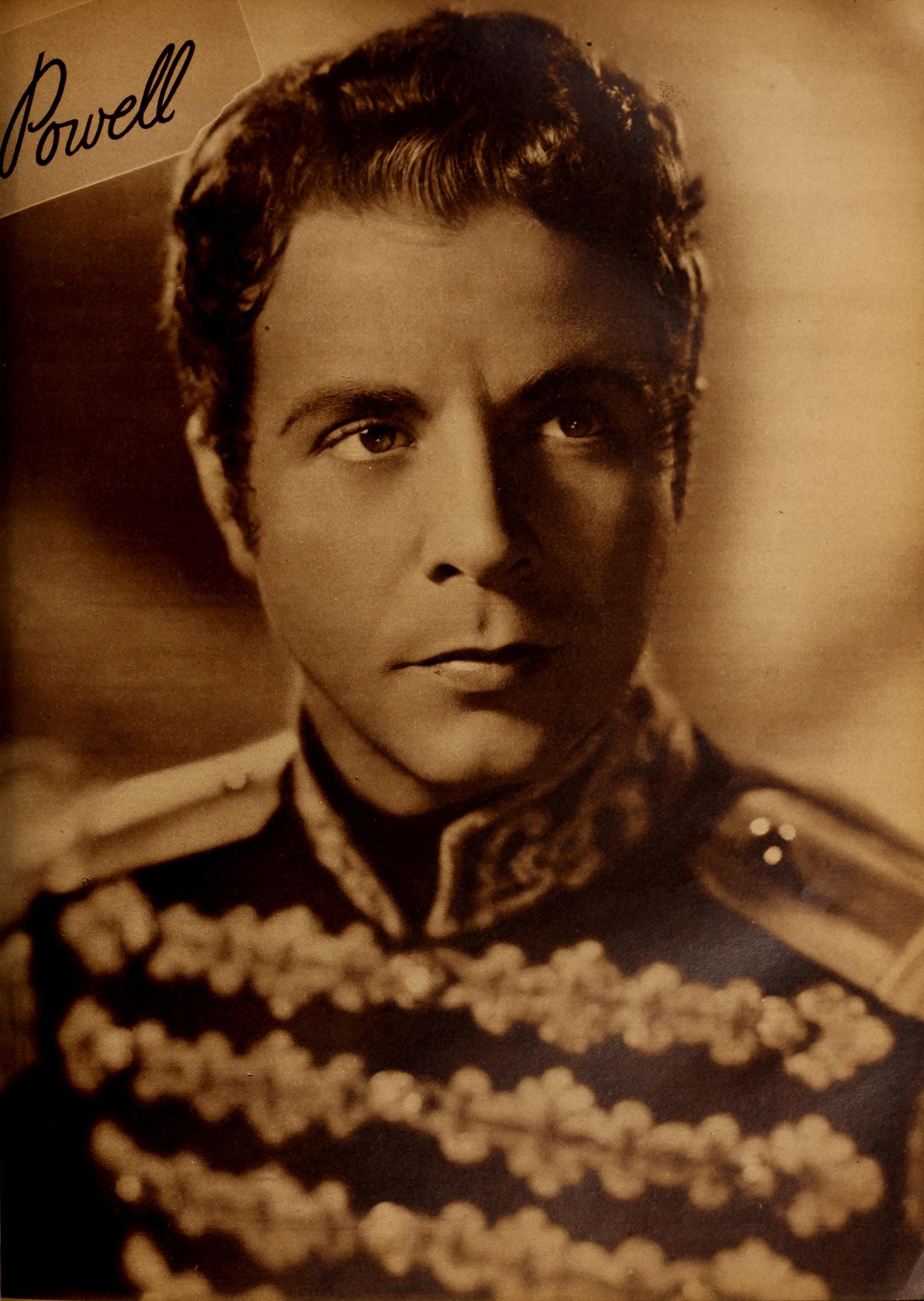
Dick Powell as Jérôme Bonaparte

Hearts Divided is a 1936 American musical film about the real-life marriage between American Elizabeth 'Betsy' Patterson and Jérôme Bonaparte, brother of Napoleon. It stars Marion Davies and Dick Powell as the couple. The film was a remake of the 1928 silent film Glorious Betsy, which was in turn based on the play Glorious Betsy by Rida Johnson Young. In real life, they were married in Baltimore, before sailing for Europe. Napoleon annulled the marriage, in spite of the existence of a child, and forced Jerome to marry Catharina of Württemberg, making him king of Westphalia. “Luckily, Hollywood treats the lovers Betsy and Jerome with a little more compassion. The couple is even granted a second chance at happiness by Claude Rains' Napoleon.”

== Plot ==
In 1803, Napoleon Bonaparte wants to sell a huge swathe of land (which would become the Louisiana Territory) to the United States for $20 million. He gives his younger brother Jérôme a choice between a “goodwill” tour of the United States to assist this effort or a mission to visit Princess Catharina of Württemberg, daughter of the King of Württemberg, with marriage in mind. Jéröme chooses the United States. He meets Elizabeth Patterson, the daughter of a Baltimore banker, and woos her as M. Giroux, a French tutor, without identifying himself to her or her family. Elizabeth is also being courted by two senators and a visiting English aristocrat. The trio provides comic relief.

They fall in love and talk about becoming M. and Mrs. Giroux. He reveals himself at a ball, to everyone's shock, but quickly assures Betsy that he still wants to marry her.

The couple sail to France, planning to marry there. On shipboard, Napoleon confronts Betsy with the importance of an alliance with Württemberg to the fate of France and the idea that Jerome will grow to hate himself if he abandons his duty. Betsy agrees to sail back to America that night without telling Jerome anything about it. Her father and her suitors welcome her home. In France, Jerome is furious with Napoleon. Their mother intervenes and asks Napoleon to let his brother have his life to live as he pleases.

Betsy weeps in a gazebo. The three suitors approach and ask her to choose among them. She declines and walks into the garden. She hears Jerome singing on the other side of the wall. They run to the garden gate and into each other's arms.

== Cast ==
- Marion Davies as Elizabeth Patterson
- Dick Powell as Captain Jerome Bonaparte
- Charles Ruggles as Senator Henry Ruggles
- Claude Rains as Napoleon Bonaparte
- Edward Everett Horton as Senator John Hathaway
- Arthur Treacher as Sir Harry
- Henry Stephenson as Charles Patterson
- Clara Blandick as Aunt Ellen Patterson
- John Larkin as Isham
- Walter Kingsford as Monsieur Pichon
- Etienne Girardot as Monsieur Du Fresne
- Halliwell Hobbes as Cambaceres
- George Irving as President Thomas Jefferson
- Beulah Bondi as Madame Letizia Bonaparte
- Philip Hurlic as Pippin
- John Elliott as James Monroe (uncredited)
- Sam McDaniel as Zachariah (uncredited)

The cast credits conclude by listing the Hall Johnson Choir.

== Songs ==
- "My Kingdom for a Kiss (Pour Un Baiser)" - music by Harry Warren, lyrics by Al Dubin
- "Two Hearts Divided (Deux Coeurs Navrés)" - music by Harry Warren, lyrics by Al Dubin
- "Nobody Knows the Trouble I've Seen"
- "Rise Up Children and Shine" (cut from final release)
