= Champions (1984 film) =

- Theatrical release poster
- Directed by: John Irvin
- Written by: Evan Jones
- Produced by: Peter Shaw
- Starring: John Hurt; Edward Woodward; Jan Francis; Ben Johnson
- Cinematography: Ronnie Taylor
- Edited by: Peter Honess
- Music by: Carl Davis
- Distributed by: Embassy Pictures (through 20th Century Fox)
- Release date: 20 April 1984
- Running time: 106 minutes
- Country: United Kingdom
- Language: English

Champions is a 1984 British drama sports film based on the true story of jockey Bob Champion. It is directed by John Irvin, produced by Peter Shaw, written by Evan Jones, and stars John Hurt, Edward Woodward, Jan Francis and Aldaniti as himself.

== Plot ==
The film is based on the true story of Bob Champion (portrayed by John Hurt), who was diagnosed with testicular cancer in 1979. After treatment with an operation to remove the diseased testicle and chemotherapy, Champion recovered and went on to win the 1981 Grand National on Aldaniti.

== Cast ==
- John Hurt as Bob Champion
- Edward Woodward as Josh Gifford
- Jan Francis as Jo Beswick
- Ben Johnson as Burly Cocks
- Alison Steadman as Mary Hussey
- Kirstie Alley as Barbara
- Ann Bell as Valda Embiricos
- Peter Barkworth as Nick Embiricos
- Judy Parfitt as Dr Merrow
- Michael Byrne as Richard Hussey
- Aldaniti as himself

== Production ==
The film was developed by United British Artists.

== Awards ==
In 1984, John Irvin was nominated for the Golden Bear Award at the 34th Berlin International Film Festival.

In 1985, John Hurt won an award at the Evening Standard British Film Awards for his role in the film.

== See also ==
- List of films about horses
- List of films about horse racing
