= The Prodigal (1931 film) =

1931 film

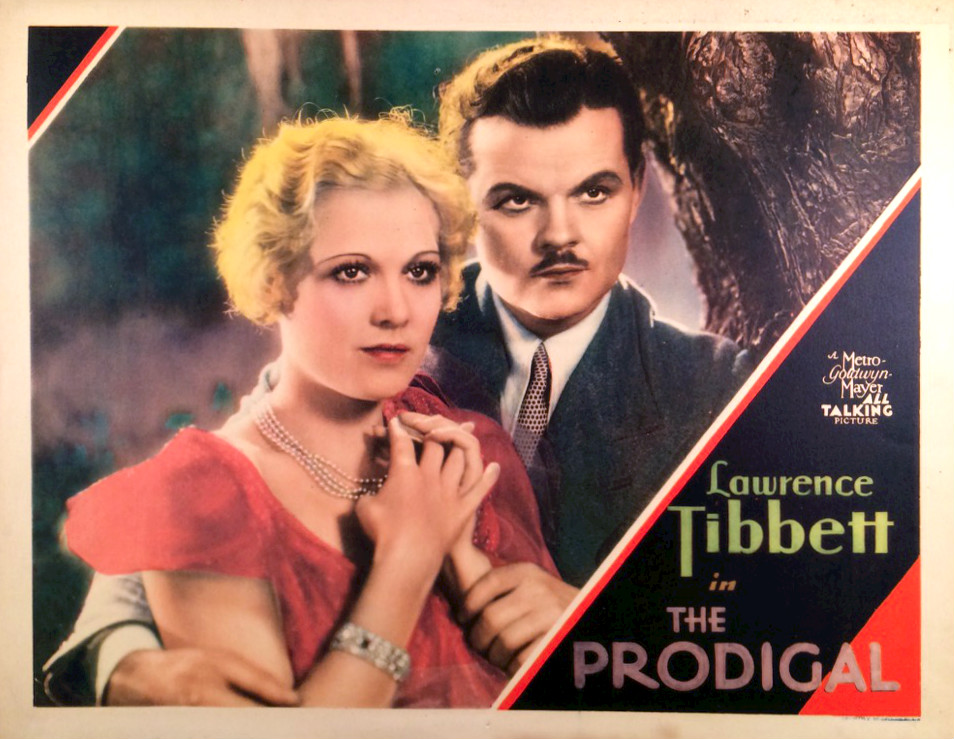
- Lobby card featuring Lawrence Tibbett and Esther Ralston
- Directed by: Harry A. Pollard
- Screenplay by: Bess Meredyth; Wells Root
- Based on: The Southerner short story by Bess Meredyth; Wells Root
- Produced by: Paul Bern
- Starring: Lawrence Tibbett; Esther Ralston; Roland Young; Cliff Edwards; Purnell Pratt; Hedda Hopper; Stepin Fetchit
- Cinematography: Harold Rosson
- Edited by: Margaret Booth
- Music by: Herbert Stothart
- Production company: Metro-Goldwyn-Mayer
- Distributed by: Metro-Goldwyn-Mayer
- Release date: February 21, 1931
- Running time: 76 minutes
- Country: United States
- Language: English

The Prodigal is a 1931 Pre-Code early talkie film starring Lawrence Tibbett, Esther Ralston, Roland Young and Hedda Hopper. The film was extremely provocative in its time in that it viewed adultery in a non-judgmental, even positive light.

== Cast ==
- Lawrence Tibbett as Jeffrey Farraday
- Esther Ralston as Antonia Farraday
- Roland Young as Doc aka Somerset Greenman
- Cliff Edwards as Snipe, a Tramp
- Purnell Pratt as Rodman Farraday
- Hedda Hopper as Christine
- Emma Dunn as Mrs. Cynthia Farraday
- Stepin Fetchit as Hokey
- Louis John Bartels as George
- Theodore von Eltz as Carter Jerome
- Wally Albright as Peter
- Susanne Ransom as Elsbeth
- Gertrude Howard as Naomi
- John Larkin as Andrew Jackson Jones

== See also ==
- Pre-Code sex films

== Sources ==
- Doherty, Thomas Patrick. Pre-Code Hollywood: Sex, Immorality, and Insurrection in American Cinema 1930-1934. New York: Columbia University Press 1999. ISBN 0-231-11094-4
