= April Love (film) =

1957 film by Henry Levin

- Directed by: Henry Levin
- Screenplay by: Winston Miller
- Based on: Phantom Filly; 1941 novel by George Agnew Chamberlain
- Produced by: David Weisbart
- Starring: Pat Boone; Shirley Jones; Dolores Michaels
- Cinematography: Wilfred M. Cline
- Edited by: William B. Murphy
- Music by: Sammy Fain; Alfred Newman
- Production company: 20th Century-Fox
- Distributed by: 20th Century-Fox
- Release date: November 27, 1957
- Running time: 97 minutes
- Country: United States
- Language: English
- Budget: $1,425,000
- Box office: $3.7 million (US and Canada rentals)

April Love is a 1957 American musical film directed by Henry Levin and produced by David Weisbart, based on the novel Phantom Filly by George Agnew Chamberlain (New York City, 1941). Photographed in CinemaScope and DeLuxe Color by Wilfred M. Cline, it was the fourth most popular movie of 1957 and stars Pat Boone, Shirley Jones, Arthur O'Connell, Dolores Michaels, Matt Crowley, Jeanette Nolan and Bradford Jackson.

The title song, sung by Boone, went to number one on the Billboard Chart in December 1957 and was nominated for an Academy Award for Best Original Song.

== Plot ==
Nick Conover, a Chicago youth, arrives at his aunt Henrietta and uncle Jed Bruce's Kentucky horse farm. Neither has seen Nick since he was a child. The move is part of Nick's parole condition after he was convicted for joyriding in a stolen vehicle with his friends. Jed initially does not want Nick in his home, and Nick gradually realizes that the reason Jed is hostile to him stems from the loss of his only son, Jed Bruce Jr., who was killed in the Korean War.

Jed once raised, trained, and raced horses for harness racing. Only one horse remains, a spirited and largely unmanageable stallion named Tugfire. Nick, who is inexperienced with horses, gets into the corral alone with Tugfire, who charges him.

Nick meets the Bruces' neighbors, the Templetons, after the younger Templeton daughter, Liz, arrives to invite Jed and Nick to their farm. Nick is amazed at how lavish the Templeton farm is compared to his aunt and uncle's. Liz is the tomboy and farm lover who has a crush on Nick, while her elder sister Fran is the sophisticate who is dating Al Turner. However, Nick is attracted to Fran. He declines Fran's offer to let him drive her sports car, without explaining that his driver's license was revoked. Nick's love of mechanics becomes evident when he fixes Jed's tractor, and the old jalopy sitting in the barn with Liz's help.

Nick spends time with both Templeton girls, and sees Liz as a "good sport" and Fran as girlfriend material, though she is with Al. The four get along well together, despite Liz knowing that Nick is attracted to Fran. At a barbecue, Nick boasts to Fran that his jalopy could outperform her sports car in a drag race. Fran suggests they race on a back country road. Even though it violates his parole condition, Nick agrees. During the race, Fran drives off the road and crashes her car through a fence, although she and Al escape unharmed. While driving his jalopy around the track, Nick spooks Tugfire, who jumps the corral fence and runs off. Nick frees Tugfire after he gets caught in prickly brambles. Jed and Henrietta are surprised to see a calm Tugfire being led by Nick. Jed resolves to train a reluctant Nick to ride Tugfire in harness races, and Nick's training eventually improves.

Shortly before the harness races at the Bentonville Fair, Tugfire falls ill after Nick leaves him in the corral during a severe storm. Late into the night with Nick, Liz and Uncle Jed keeping vigil, Tugfire gets up. After a quick examination, Jed believes the horse will be able to race. In the excitement of Tugfire's improved condition, Liz gives Nick a quick kiss, which finally makes Nick see her in a more romantic light.

At the fair, Nick and Liz declare their romantic interest to each other, culminating with them almost kissing on the Ferris wheel. During the harness races, Nick and Tugfire win the first heat. In the second heat, Nick gets boxed in by the Templetons' rider. As the other rider will not let him pass on the inside, Nick hastily tries to muscle his way through, but ends up crashing the sulky. Jed decides to pull Nick and Tugfire from the finals, realizing that he placed too much pressure on Nick. However, Nick wants to race in the finals. Jed watches from the sidelines as Nick uses his earlier training and drives down the stretch to win the race.

Afterwards, the local sheriff arrives to arrest Nick and send him back to Chicago for parole violation. Not knowing it would cause any problems, Fran filed an accident report about her automobile crash, stating Nick was driver of the other vehicle. Liz steps in to say that Fran was mistaken, and that she was the driver, a story which Fran and Henriette falsely corroborate. Nick, wanting to do the right thing, confesses that Fran's report is correct. The sheriff decides to let Nick stay in Kentucky, having been told by Mr. Templeton to do so since it was a minor infraction and no one got hurt, much to everyone else's relief.

== Cast ==
- Pat Boone as Nick Conover
- Shirley Jones as Liz Templeton
- Dolores Michaels as Fran Templeton
- Arthur O'Connell as Jed Bruce
- Matt Crowley as Dan Templeton
- Jeanette Nolan as Henrietta Bruce
- Bradford Jackson as Al Turner

== Production ==
The movie was a remake of Home in Indiana (1944) and was originally called Young in Love. Production began in June 1957, before the public had seen Boone's first move Bernardine. Henry Levin directed both Bernadine and April Love.

Filming took place in Hollywood and on location in Kentucky. At the beginning of the shoot in Kentucky, Boone was in a car accident while filming a scene. He was a passenger in a car which was to be overtaken by a car driven by two local girls; the cars collided but Boone was uninjured. Boone did not kiss Shirley Jones on screen for fear of upsetting his wife.

== Reception ==
The film was a hit at the box office. Kinematograph Weekly listed it as being "in the money" at the British box office in 1958.

=== Critical ===
Most critical notices of the film tended to be mixed. Leonard Maltin described it as an "engaging musical" while The New York Times' Bosley Crowther said it had "two of the nicest-looking young singers to be found anywhere, a batch of pleasant tunes, some nifty Kentucky scenery in good color and absolutely no plot." Harold Whitehead of The Montreal Gazette observed that it was a "long, slow musical romance", and in particular noted that Boone, "the respectable hero of the teen-agers, seems to have worked so hard at gaining his reputation that he has turned himself into a rather pompous young man."

Boone regards it as one of his favorites, "the kind of movie I wish I could have made 20 more of: a musical, appealing characters, some drama, a good storyline, a happy ending, it's the kind of film which makes you feel good. I never wanted to make a depressing or immoral film." Reviewing this, Diabolique magazine later wrote "Why didn't he? The film was a hit...And it wasn't as if Fox lacked Americana stories in their back catalog that they could remake [...] Why didn't someone put him together with Jones again?

The film is recognized by American Film Institute in these lists:

- 2004: AFI's 100 Years...100 Songs:
  - "April Love" – Nominated

== Cultural references ==
The film appears in a scene in Damien – Omen II (1978).

== See also ==
- List of American films of 1957
- List of films about horses
- List of films about horse racing
