= Home in Indiana =

1944 film by Henry Hathaway

- Directed by: Henry Hathaway
- Screenplay by: Winston Miller
- Based on: The Phantom Filly; 1941 novel by George Agnew Chamberlain
- Produced by: André Daven
- Starring: Walter Brennan; Charlotte Greenwood; Ward Bond
- Narrated by: Reed Hadley
- Cinematography: Edward Cronjager
- Edited by: Harmon Jones
- Music by: Hugo Friedhofer
- Distributed by: 20th Century Fox
- Release date: June 15, 1944
- Running time: 103 minutes
- Country: United States
- Language: English
- Box office: $1.75 million

Home in Indiana is a 1944 Technicolor drama film directed by Henry Hathaway. The film, starring Walter Brennan, Lon McCallister, Jeanne Crain, June Haver and Charlotte Greenwood, is based on the novel The Phantom Filly by George Agnew Chamberlain (1879–1966). The film was remade in 1957 as April Love.

The movie was nominated for an Oscar in the category Best Cinematography, Color.

== Plot ==
Having just been sent away to live with his uncle and aunt in Indiana, teenager Sparke Thornton has a penchant for trouble. At first, he is not satisfied with the arrangement, and continues to express his rebellious behavior. Already on his first day, he plans on running away, but crossing a harness racing track convinces him to stay in Indiana. The owner, Godaw Boole welcomes Sparke, and introduces him to Char Bruce, a tomboyish girl who loves to race horses. A servant informs him that his uncle Thunder Bolt was once part of harness horse racing as a respected sulky driver.

Returning home, Sparke informs his family about his love for horses, but Thunder orders him to put his focus on school instead. The next day, he ignores his uncle's demands and visits the racing track, where his instinctive rapport with a stallion impresses Godaw's seductive daughter Cri-Cri, who is home from private boarding school. She convinces Jed Bruce to help Sparke learn how to drive. Even though he performs poorly during his first trainings, Sparke is allowed to come back due to his humility. While bonding with Char and Cri-Cri, he learns how to successfully guide a harness horse.

One night, Thunder becomes drunk and reacts violently towards Sparke. Due to his confusion, Thunder's wife Penny explains that Thunder was once partners with Boole, until Boole's harsh treatment of a mare led to a quarrel. Thunder has retired from horseback riding ever since, but still feels an urge to return. Moved by the story, Sparke becomes desperate to help out his uncle, and 'borrows' Boole's stallion to sire a foal out of Thunder's only remaining mare, and raises the money for the stud fee so that Boole will sign the registration so the foal can race. Thunder is initially furious at Sparke for interfering, but he is grateful for the outcome.

Meanwhile, Sparke's growing infatuation with Cri-Cri causes him to shift away from the track regularly. Cri-Cri feels that he is too young to take seriously, though, and she prefers the attention of Gordon Bradley. Sparke is not aware that Char is madly in love with him, and instead considers her as 'one of the guys'. Meanwhile, he continues to train the horse's foal, who, during her first race, is seriously injured. Shortly after her recovery, Sparke realizes how Char feels about him and responds to her love.

Thunder has since found out that the foal is going blind, but nevertheless allows Sparke to race her. Through determination and skills, he wins the race. Returning home with the horse, who has convinced Thunder to return to his business, Sparke kisses Char.

== Cast ==
- Walter Brennan as J. F. 'Thunder' Bolt
- Charlotte Greenwood as Penny Bolt
- Ward Bond as Jed Bruce
- Charles Dingle as Godaw Boole
- Lon McCallister as 'Sparke' Thornton
- Jeanne Crain as Charlotte 'Char' Bruce
- June Haver as Christopher 'Cri-Cri' Boole
- George H. Reed as Tuppy

== Production ==
In November 1940, 20th Century Fox first announced its plans to shoot a film about trotting tracks, called Home in Indiana. The film would serve as a follow-up for the horse tracking films Kentucky (1938) and Maryland (1940). As with the latter film, John Payne, Walter Brennan and Fay Bainter were set to serve the lead roles, with Kenneth Macgowan as a producer and John Taintor Foote as the screenwriter. Ultimately, Foote did work on a screenplay, but his work was not included in the final print.

In March 1942, agent Charles K. Feldman planned on making a film adaptation of the Chamberlain novel, with Howard Hawks as a proposed producer. Winston Miller worked on a screenplay, but he decided to sell its rights to 20th Century Fox. Actor George Cleveland was offered a role, but commitments to another project forced him to resign. The film marked the highly promoted debuts of both Jeanne Crain and June Haver. McCallister's contribution to the film delivered him a four-year contract with Fox.

Scenes were partly filmed on the trotting tracks of Indiana, Marion, Ohio Marion County Fairgrounds and Kentucky.

== Critical reception ==
Sara Hamilton of Photoplay wrote, "The heart appeal of this story, the Technicolor beauty of the countryside, the warm tender performance of Lon McCallister, render this a picture lovely to see but hard on the emotions. The fact the story lags in spots and is dullish in others is more than balanced by its good points." Hamilton viewed the performances positively, and commented, "Lon McCallister - and incidentally, this is only his second film - (the first having been Stage Door Canteen) - proves his mettle. The boy's an actor, rest assured. Jeanne Crain and June Haver are two newcomers who are here to stay. June is a beauty and Jeanne radiates naturalness and a certain naivete that is most appealing. Charlotte Greenwood, Charles Dingle and Ward Bond are splendid in supporting roles."

== See also ==
- List of American films of 1944
- List of films about horses
- List of films about horse racing
