= Sporting Blood (1931 film) =

1931 film

- Film poster
- Directed by: Charles Brabin
- Screenplay by: Charles Brabin
- Based on: Horse Flesh; 1930 The Saturday Evening Post by Frederick Brennan
- Produced by: Marion Davies
- Starring: Clark Gable; Ernest Torrence; Madge Evans
- Cinematography: Harold Rosson
- Edited by: William S. Gray (uncredited)
- Music by: William Axt
- Distributed by: Metro-Goldwyn-Mayer
- Release date: August 8, 1931
- Running time: 82 minutes
- Country: United States
- Language: English
- Budget: $302,000
- Box office: $893,000

Sporting Blood is a 1931 American MGM pre-Code sports drama film directed by Charles Brabin. The film stars Clark Gable (in his first starring role), Ernest Torrence, and Madge Evans. Two other pictures bore this same title, one released in 1916 by Fox and another by MGM in Sporting Blood (1940). Although they, too, centered on horse racing, none of the plots had any direct connection with the others.

== Plot ==
Gambler Rid Riddell works for Tip Scanlon, a crooked gambler, who buys Tommy-Boy, a racehorse from a wealthy man whose spoiled wife loses interest. Tip and Rid consistently win with the horse in both honestly and dishonestly run races. But before long, Tommy Boy loses a race he wasn't supposed to, and the mob is after Tip.

Tip is murdered but not before giving Tommy Boy to his girlfriend who sets out to rehabilitate herself and the horse. The horse rebounds. After an attempt at sabotage, the horse wins the Kentucky Derby, and Rid wins the girl.

== Cast ==
- Clark Gable as Warren 'Rid' Riddell
- Ernest Torrence as Mr. Jim Rellence
- Madge Evans as Miss 'Missy' Ruby
- Lew Cody as Tip Scanlon
- Marie Prevost as Angela 'Angie' Ludeking
- Hallam Cooley as Bill Ludeking
- J. Farrell MacDonald as MacGuire
- John Larkin as Uncle Ben
- Eugene Jackson as Sammy
- Harry Holman as Jerry Hartwick (uncredited)

== Box office ==
According to MGM records, the film earned $547,000 in the US and Canada and $346,000 elsewhere resulting in a profit of $148,000.

== See also ==
- List of films about horses
- List of films about horse racing
