= 1981 Grand National =

English steeplechase horse race

- Grand National
- Location: Aintree Racecourse
- Date: 4 April 1981
- Winning horse: (England) Aldaniti
- Starting price: 10/1
- Jockey: (England) Bob Champion
- Trainer: (England) Josh Gifford
- Owner: Nick Embiricos
- Conditions: Good

External videos
- 1981 Grand National in full BBC Sport/YouTube
- 1981 Grand National in full BBC Sport/YouTube

It's Aldaniti in the lead but being pressed now by Spartan Missile. It's Aldaniti from Spartan Missile and here comes John Thorne, 54 year old John Thorne putting in a storming finish. It's Aldaniti from Spartan Missile. Aldaniti is gonna win it, at the line, Aldaniti wins the National!

— BBC commentator Peter O'Sullevan describes the climax of the race

The 1981 Grand National (officially known as The Sun Grand National for sponsorship reasons) was the 135th renewal of the Grand National horse race that took place at Aintree Racecourse near Liverpool, England, on 4 April 1981.

It is remembered for the winning horse Aldaniti, who had recovered from chronic leg problems, and his jockey Bob Champion, who had recovered from cancer. Aldaniti's injuries dated back to 1976, while Champion had been diagnosed with testicular cancer in 1979. However, Aldaniti was nursed back to optimum form ahead of the race, and Champion overcame lengthy hospitalisation and chemotherapy to win the National by a distance of four lengths. In second place was the 8/1 favourite, Spartan Missile, ridden by 54-year-old amateur jockey and grandfather John Thorne. The story of Bob Champion and Aldaniti was made into a film Champions, with John Hurt portraying Champion. The film is based on Champion's book Champion's Story, which he co-wrote with close friend and racing journalist and broadcaster Jonathan Powell.

== Finishing order ==
Position	Horse	Jockey	Age	Handicap (st-lb)	SP	Distance
01	Aldaniti	Bob Champion	11	10-13	10/1	4 lengths
02	Spartan Missile	John Thorne	9	11-5	8/1 F	
03	Royal Mail	Philip Blacker	11	11-7	16/1	
04	Three To One	Geordie Dun	10	10-3	33/1	
05	Senator Maclacury	John Burke	7	10-12	20/1	
06	Royal Exile	Ben De Haan	12	10-0	16/1	
07	Rubstic	Maurice Barnes	12	10-7	11/1	
08	Coolishall	Bill Smith	12	10-3	25/1	
09	Rathlek	Paul Barton	11	10-1	50/1	
10	So	John Francome	12	10-8	40/1	
11	Sebastian V	Ridley Lamb	13	10-2	33/1	
12	Cheers	Peter Scudamore	9	10-0	20/1	Last to finish

== Non-finishers ==
Fence	Horse	Jockey	Age	Weight (st-lb)	SP	Fate
01	Another Captain	Colin Hawkins	9	10-0	40/1	Fell
01	Barney Maclyvie	Martin Lynch	10	10-8	33/1	Unseated rider
04	Bryan Boru	John Carden	10	10-0	100/1	Refused
04	Delmoss	Frank Berry	11	10-1	50/1	Fell
04	Kilkilwell	Niall Madden	9	10-6	33/1	Refused
04	Chumson	Aiden O'Connell	10	11-7	50/1	Fell
08 (Canal Turn)	Another Prospect	Jim Wilson	9	10-8	40/1	Fell
09 (Valentine's)	Drumroan	Marcus Graffe	13	10-6	50/1	Unseated rider
09 (Valentine's)	No Gypsy	John Suthern	12	10-0	100/1	Fell
10	Carrow Boy	Gerry Newman	9	11-6	33/1	Fell
10	Kininvie	Philip Hobbs	12	10-0	100/1	Unseated rider
11 (open ditch)	Tenecoon	Charlie Mann	12	10-0	100/1	Unseated rider
12	Dromore	Peter Duggan	13	10-8	100/1	Refused
13	Lord Gulliver	Colin Brown	8	10-0	50/1	Fell
17	Kylogue Lady	Richard Quinn	9	10-0	100/1	Fell
19 (open ditch)	Deiopea	Linda Sheedy	10	10-0	100/1	Refused
19 (open ditch)	Son and Heir	Sam Morshead	11	10-0	100/1	Refused
19 (open ditch)	The Vintner	Chris Grant	10	10-8	20/1	Refused
20	Royal Stuart	Hywel Davies	10	10-2	16/1	Unseated rider
22 (Becher's Brook)	Pacify	Steve Jobar	11	10-0	50/1	Fell
22 (Becher's Brook)	Zongalero	Steve Smith-Eccles	11	10-11	14/1	Fell
24 (Canal Turn)	Three Of Diamonds	Paul Leach	9	10-4	100/1	Fell
26	Might Be	Anthony Webber	10	10-0	50/1	Fell
27 (open ditch)	Choral Festival	Marcus Low	10	10-2	66/1	Unseated rider
27 (open ditch)	Martinstown	Malcolm Batters	9	10-7	33/1	Unseated rider
27 (open ditch)	My Friendly Cousin	Alan Brown	11	10-2	100/1	Pulled up
28	Casamayor	Paul Webber	11	10-6	100/1	Refused

== Media coverage ==
David Coleman presented Grand National Grandstand on the BBC in what turned out being one of the most famous Nationals of all-time. On BBC radio Peter Bromley gave an emotional commentary after which John Oaksey remarked: "If an imaginative novelist had dreamt up that result everybody would have called him a very silly imaginative novelist."

== Aftermath ==
The story of Champion and Aldaniti become known as Racing's greatest fairytale, and has become a lasting inspiration to people battling cancer ever since. Two years after the victory, the Bob Champion Cancer Trust was created and the story inspired a movie of Bob's own personal battle to get fit to ride in the National the following year, called Champions starring John Hurt.
