= Men of Chance =

1931 film

- Directed by: George Archainbaud; Tommy Atkins (assistant)
- Written by: Louis Weitzenkorn
- Screenplay by: Louis Stevens; Eddie Welch
- Produced by: William LeBaron
- Starring: Ricardo Cortez; Mary Astor; John Halliday
- Cinematography: Nicholas Musuraca
- Edited by: Archie Marshek
- Music by: Max Steiner
- Production company: RKO Radio Pictures
- Distributed by: RKO Radio Pictures
- Release date: December 1931 (New York)
- Running time: 67 minutes
- Country: United States
- Language: English

Men of Chance is a 1931 American pre-Code drama film directed by George Archainbaud, starring Ricardo Cortez, Mary Astor, and John Halliday.

== Plot ==
A destitute Marthe Preston is in dire straits in Paris until gambler Richard Dorval comes to her aid. In gratitude, she agrees to a scheme of Dorval's to seduce and wed his rival, "Diamond Johnny" Silk, then help ruin Johnny's horse-racing business interests.

Marthe's inside information enables Dorval and an accomplice, bookie Joe Farley, to bribe Johnny's jockeys to deliberately lose races or to help them influence the odds. Johnny learns the truth and demands she leave. Martha has fallen in love with her husband, however, so she pretends to go along with a plot to poison Johnny's horse, double-crossing Dorval and rejoicing in Johnny's triumph.

== Cast ==
- Ricardo Cortez as Johnny Silk
- Mary Astor as Marthe Preston Silk
- John Halliday as Richard Dorval
- Ralph Ince as Joe Farley
- Kitty Kelly as Gertie Robbins
- James Donlan as Clark
- George Davis as The Frenchman

Uncredited:

- Herman Bing as Fritz Tannenbaum
- André Cheron as French Detective
- Jean De Briac as Hotel Manager
- Tom Herbert as One of Johnny's Bookies
- John Larkin as Black Horse Handler
- Tom McGuire as Race Track Bookie
- Frank Mills as Tony - One of Johnny's Bookies

== Critical reception ==
Mordaunt Hall of the The New York Times wrote, "The acting of Mary Astor and Ricardo Cortez in the principal rôles is a triumph of mind over some pretty painful dialogue." Hall also commented that the racetrack scenes were well done and captured some of the excitement of the track.

The Film Daily gave the film a more positive review, and described it as "an unpretentious but thoroughly entertaining story", and wrote that Ricardo Cortez and Mary Astor "do some of their best work."

== See also ==
- List of films about horses
- List of films about horse racing
