= Aldaniti =

British-bred Thoroughbred racehorse (1970–1997)

- Sire: Derek H
- Grandsire: Court Harwell
- Dam: Renardeau
- Damsire: Reynard Volant
- Sex: Gelding
- Foaled: 1970
- Country: Great Britain
- Colour: Chestnut
- Breeder: Harrowgate Stud
- Owner: Nick Embiricos
- Trainer: Josh Gifford

Major wins
- Grand National (1981)

Aldaniti (25 June 1970 – 28 March 1997) was a racehorse who won the Grand National on 4 April 1981. His jockey on that day, Bob Champion, had recovered from cancer, while Aldaniti had recovered after suffering a career-threatening injury. The horse was trained by Josh Gifford.

Aldaniti starred as himself in the 1984 film Champions alongside John Hurt. His Grand National win was voted 61st of the 100 Greatest Sporting Moments in a Channel 4 opinion poll.

== Background ==
Aldaniti was a chestnut gelding bred in the United Kingdom by Harrowgate Stud. His name was derived from the names of his breeder Tommy Barron's four grandchildren, Alastair, David, Nicola, and Timothy. During his racing career he was owned by Nick Embiricos from Kirdford, West Sussex, and trained by Josh Gifford at Findon.

== Racing career ==
Aldaniti emerged as a top-class steeplechaser in the 1978/79 National Hunt season. He finished third in the 1979 Cheltenham Gold Cup and second in the Scottish Grand National. He sustained a serious leg injury at Sandown in November 1979 and was off the racecourse for over a year.

He returned in 1981 with the Grand National as his target and established himself as a legitimate contender with a win in the Whitbread Trial Chase at Ascot in February. At Aintree the gelding was assigned a weight of 153 pounds, and started the race 10/1 second favourite behind Spartan Missile, a dual winner of the Fox Hunters' Chase. Aldaniti took the lead at the eleventh fence and maintained his advantage for the rest of the race, fighting off a late challenge from Spartan Missile on the run-in to win by four lengths. The next day, more than 3,000 people turned out to welcome the horse back to his stable at Findon.

Aldaniti also ran in the 1982 Grand National with Bob Champion, but fell at the first fence.

== Retirement ==
Aldaniti was retired from racing in 1982 and spent the remainder of his life at his owner's farm in Sussex. He died of old age in March 1997.

A British Rail Class 86 electric locomotive was named after him.

== Grand National record ==
Grand National	Position	Jockey	Age	Weight	SP	Distance
1981	1st	Bob Champion	11	10-13	10/1	Won by 4 lengths
1982	DNF	Bob Champion	12	11-9	12/1	Fell at fence 1

== Pedigree ==
Pedigree of Aldaniti (GB), chestnut gelding, 1970
Sire Derek H (GB) 1962	Court Harwell (GB); 1954	Prince Chevalier	Prince Rose
Sire Derek H (GB) 1962	Court Harwell (GB); 1954	Prince Chevalier	Chevalerie
Sire Derek H (GB) 1962	Court Harwell (GB); 1954	Neutron	Hyperion
Sire Derek H (GB) 1962	Court Harwell (GB); 1954	Neutron	Participation
Sire Derek H (GB) 1962	Abadek (GB); 1954	Abadan	Persian Gulf
Sire Derek H (GB) 1962	Abadek (GB); 1954	Abadan	Affair
Sire Derek H (GB) 1962	Abadek (GB); 1954	EGK	Rentenmark
Sire Derek H (GB) 1962	Abadek (GB); 1954	EGK	Ardgo
Dam Renardeau (GB) 1953	Reynard Volant (GB); 1942	Foxhunter	Foxlaw
Dam Renardeau (GB) 1953	Reynard Volant (GB); 1942	Foxhunter	Trimestral
Dam Renardeau (GB) 1953	Reynard Volant (GB); 1942	Flying Shell	Tetratema
Dam Renardeau (GB) 1953	Reynard Volant (GB); 1942	Flying Shell	Flying Sally
Dam Renardeau (GB) 1953	Speckless (GB); 1939	Cameronian	Pharos
Dam Renardeau (GB) 1953	Speckless (GB); 1939	Cameronian	Una Cameron
Dam Renardeau (GB) 1953	Speckless (GB); 1939	Collina	Sansovino
Dam Renardeau (GB) 1953	Speckless (GB); 1939	Collina	Little Mark (Family: 8-k)
