= Bob Champion =

English jump jockey

Bob Champion CBE
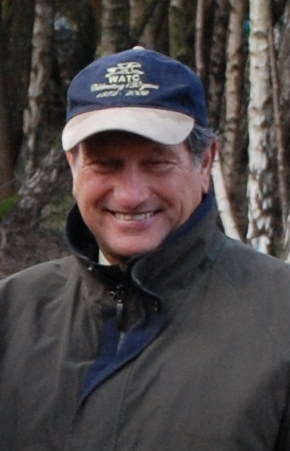
- Champion in 2008

Personal information
- Born: 4 June 1948 (age 78) Sussex, England
- Occupations: Racehorse jockey, trainer

Horse racing career
- Sport: Horse racing

Major racing wins
- Grand National (1981)

Significant horses
- Aldaniti

Robert Champion CBE (born 4 June 1948) is an English former jump jockey, who won the 1981 Grand National on Aldaniti. His triumph, while recovering from cancer, was made into the 1984 film Champions, with John Hurt portraying Champion. The film is based on Champion's book Champion's Story, which he wrote with close friend, racing journalist and broadcaster Jonathan Powell.

== Biography ==
Champion was born in Sussex, but very soon after his birth the family moved to Guisborough in the North Riding of Yorkshire. During his childhood, he rode the donkey Lively Laddie, who was born in 1943 and lived to at least 60 years old.

In July 1979, at the height of his career as a jockey, he was diagnosed with testicular cancer. He was treated with an orchidectomy and with the chemotherapeutic drugs bleomycin, vinblastine and cisplatin, and also had an exploratory operation to identify cancer in his lymph nodes. His victory on Aldaniti was viewed by many as a great triumph, following his adversity. Their victory in the Grand National earned them that year's BBC Sports Personality of the Year Team Award, and was chosen by Channel 4 viewers in 2002 as one of the 100 Greatest Sporting Moments.

Other major races that Champion won during his career include the Hennessy Cognac Gold Cup and the Whitbread Trial Chase. He was appointed Member of the Order of the British Empire (MBE) in the 1982 Birthday Honours. In 1983 he formed the Bob Champion Cancer Trust, which has raised millions of pounds for cancer research.

He was the subject of This Is Your Life in 1981, when he was surprised, on his wedding day, by Eamonn Andrews.

Champion became a trainer based in Newmarket. The first horse he bought as such was "Just Martin" for owner Frank Pullen, who also built his yard. He retired from training horses in 1999.

On 22 December 2011, Champion received the BBC Sports Personality of the Year Helen Rollason Award award as part of the 2011 BBC Sports Personality of the Year competition.

He was appointed Commander of the Order of the British Empire (CBE) in the 2021 New Year Honours for services to prostate and testicular cancer research.

The Bob Champion Research and Education Building which is part of the University of East Anglia campus is named after him.

== Works ==
- Bob Champion and Jonathan Powell, Champion's Story: A Great Human Triumph, Victor Gollancs Ltd. (1981). ISBN 978-0575030190
- Bob Champion, I'm Champion, Call Me Bob, FCM Publishing, Lincoln, (2018). ISBN 978-0995594371
