= Sporting Blood (1940 film) =

- Directed by: S. Sylvan Simon
- Starring: Robert Young; Maureen O'Sullivan; Lewis Stone
- Cinematography: Sidney Wagner
- Edited by: Frank Sullivan
- Music by: Franz Waxman
- Production company: Metro-Goldwyn-Mayer
- Release date: July 12, 1940
- Running time: 82 minutes
- Country: United States
- Language: English

Sporting Blood is a 1940 American drama film, directed by S. Sylvan Simon for Metro-Goldwyn-Mayer. It stars Robert Young, Maureen O'Sullivan, and Lewis Stone.

== Plot ==
In need of money, Myles Vanders returns to his old Virginia home, once a thriving horse farm that has fallen on hard times. Years have gone by but he still is subject to resentment of the community for Myles' father having scandalously run off with neighboring stable owner Davis Lockwood's wife.

Myles manages to persuade Lockwood to lend him $3,000 to train and enter his horse Skipper in an upcoming stakes race. Myles must put up his farm as collateral. Lockwood tells his daughters Linda and Joan not to associate with Myles or trust him. Linda says he should be given a fair chance, while Joan attracts a romantic interest from Myles.

A fire injures Myles's horse and all but ruins his chances for repaying his debt. Things get worse when Joan elopes with a wealthy man while Myles learns a servant of Lockwood's started the fire. A sympathetic Linda offers him her horse, Miss Richmond, to enter in the race. Myles does so, also marrying Linda to incur Lockwood's wrath. She leaves him when she sees this side of Myles, but he comes to his senses, wins her back and wins the race.

== Cast ==
- Robert Young as Myles Vanders
- Maureen O'Sullivan as Linda Lockwood
- Lewis Stone as Davis Lockwood
- William Gargan as Duffy
- Lynne Carver as Joan Lockwood
- Clarence Muse as Jeff
- Lloyd Corrigan as Otis Winfield
- George H. Reed as Stonewall
- Tom Kennedy as Grantley

== See also ==
- List of films about horses
- List of films about horse racing
