= The Cossacks (1960 film) =

1960 Italian film

- Directed by: Victor Tourjansky; Giorgio Rivalta
- Written by: Viktor Tourjansky; Ugo Liberatore; Federico Zardi; Damiano Damiani
- Produced by: Giampaolo Bigazzi
- Starring: Edmund Purdom; John Drew Barrymore; Giorgia Moll
- Cinematography: Massimo Dallamano
- Edited by: Antonietta Zita
- Music by: Giovanni Fusco
- Production company: Wanguard Film
- Distributed by: Variety Distribution
- Release date: 4 February 1960
- Running time: 100 min
- Country: Italy
- Language: Italian

The Cossacks (Italian: I cosacchi) is a 1960 Italian epic adventure film directed by Victor Tourjansky and Giorgio Rivalta and starring Edmund Purdom, John Drew Barrymore and Giorgia Moll.

== Plot ==
Set in Czar Alexander II's Russia during the mid-1800s, the story focuses on the conflict between the Russian Empire and the Chechen people. Shamil (Edmund Purdom), the determined leader of the Chechen resistance, is fighting for the freedom of his people against Russian expansion into the Caucasus region. A temporary peace treaty is established, and as a guarantee of this peace, Shamil's son, Giamal (John Drew Barrymore), is sent to Saint Petersburg as a token of good will.

While in Russia, Giamal becomes romantically involved with Tatiana (Giorgia Moll). He makes a new life for himself, but is caught between his new loyalties to the Russian crown and his old family ties and cultural heritage. Giamal begins to realize that peace might be a better path for his nation than his father's relentless war.

In the Russian capital, Giamal attends a military school for officer cadets and pledges allegiance to the Czar. This decision provokes the indignation and anger of his father Shamil, who views his son's actions as a betrayal of his people's struggle for independence. The fragile peace eventually breaks down, and full-scale guerrilla warfare erupts between the Chechens and the Russian forces. Shamil is determined to go to war, leading his warriors in a fierce battle for freedom. During the height of the conflict, Giamal finds himself and his fiancée, Tatiana, imprisoned by his own people.

The Chechen artillery bombards the Russian army camp while the soldiers are in the middle of a mass celebration. In a desperate gesture, Giamal attempts to stop the fighting and make peace, and his own father, or a figure representing his people, is forced to shoot him down.

== Cast ==
- Edmund Purdom as Sheik Shamil
- John Drew Barrymore as Giamal
- Giorgia Moll as Tatiana
- Pierre Brice as Boris
- Elena Zareschi as Fátima
- Erno Crisa as Casi
- Massimo Girotti as Czar Alexander II
- Maria Grazia Spina as Alina
- Mario Pisu as Voronzov
- Laura Carli as Miss Ferguson
- Nerio Bernardi as General Rasumovsky
- Louis Seigner as Bibikoff, old Russian General
- Giuliano Gemma as Young Man at Academy (uncredited)
- Mara Berni as Lady with White Dog
- Liana Del Balzo as Grandduchess, Aunt of Tsar (uncredited)
