= High Lonesome (film) =

1950 film by Alan Le May

- Film poster
- Directed by: Alan Le May
- Written by: Alan Le May
- Produced by: George Templeton
- Starring: John Drew Barrymore
- Cinematography: W. Howard Greene
- Edited by: Jack Ogilvie
- Music by: Rudy Schrager
- Production company: Le May-Templeton Pictures
- Distributed by: Eagle-Lion Films
- Release date: September 1, 1950
- Running time: 80 minutes
- Country: United States
- Language: English

High Lonesome is a 1950 American Technicolor Western film written and directed by Alan Le May, who also wrote the classic Western novels The Searchers, The Unforgiven and numerous screenplays. High Lonesome is Le May's only directorial credit. The film stars John Drew Barrymore and features Chill Wills and Jack Elam.

== Plot ==
A young drifter is found stealing food at the Davis ranch by Boatwhistle, the cook and is captured by the farmhands. The elderly patriarch and retired deputy, Horse Davis, believes, due to the boy’s aggressive and desperate behaviour, that he is on the run from a crime and decides to keep him detained until he talks. His two daughters, Abby and Meagan, tend to his injuries.

The next day, rancher Pat Farrell arrives. Pat is engaged to Abby and owns the neighbouring land that previously belonged to the Jessup family. The Davis and Jessup families had been locked in a bitter feud, which only ended when the Jessups had all been killed, or, in the case of the 13-year-old son Bob Jessup, sentenced to life in prison. Pat and Abby plan to live together on the former Jessup homestead once they are married.

The drifter, nicknamed Cooncat by Boatwhistle, attempts to steal a horse to escape. But Pat easily recaptures him and drags him behind his horse until he talks. Cooncat admits that he murdered the proprietor of the Wagon Road General Store, Jim Shell, the previous night and fled.

He explains that he made camp in the ruins standing near the store. Shell had offered to look after his money for the night, as a protection against robbery. But two strangers had turned up at Cooncat’s camp, making him uneasy. He decided to leave early, but Shell refused to give him his money back, claiming he had never heard of it. Back at his camp, the two strangers, having overheard the argument, encouraged Cooncat to threaten Shell at gunpoint for his money and loaned him a pistol. Cooncat went back into the store with the gun. During the ensuing struggle, Cooncat was knocked unconscious by Shell. When he came to, he found Shell lying shot dead and fled into the night. The two strangers, who he names the Smiling Man and the Roper, pursued him but lost him in the dark. Cooncat guesses that they feared they would be found guilty of the murder and robbery unless they caught him, while Pat suspects they used Cooncat to commit the murder for them.

Horse and Pat take Cooncat and lead a posse of farmhands to the General Store to recover Shell’s body. But when they arrive, they find no sign of a body and a layer of thick dust, indicating the store has been abandoned for months. Additionally, they find no remains of Cooncat’s camp in the ruins. Cooncat’s story is thrown into further doubt when he describes the two strangers. Horse and Boatwhistle recognize the Smiling Man as Miles Jessup and the Roper as a Cajun farmhand who worked on the Jessup farmstead. Both men died fifteen years prior during the feud. Seeing that Cooncat believes his own story, Horse wonders if the boy is simply mad. Reluctant to hand him over to the authorities, Horse decides to keep him at the Davis ranch for the time being.

That night, Cooncat sees the Smiling Man and the Roper watching the Davis homestead from a distance. Reasoning that they would have simply fled if they were after him, Cooncat concludes their real target is the Davis farm.

Abby, Meagan, and Boatwhistle reluctantly help Cooncat settle into the farm life, with Abby even giving him her hat. Later, Abby catches him coming out of her and Meagan’s room and angrily berates him. But she is later touched when she realizes he had simply been leaving fresh flowers for the sisters.

The local community is invited to Pat’s barn-warming party. Boatwhistle takes Cooncat and Meagan on a cart. On the way, they stop at the property line between the Davis and former Jessup lands. There, Cooncat is shown a grisly field full of cattle skeletons, the remains of a herd that used to belong to Horse. Boatwhistle explains that whenever a blizzard happened in the past, the herd would take shelter in the nearby canyons. But when their feud with the Jessup family began, Miles Jessup built a fence along their border, cutting off the herd’s access to the canyons. Unable to get to their shelter, the cattle were wiped out in that year’s blizzard. This sparked a bloody battle at the fence between the two families, known as the Fence War. During the fighting, Miles Jessup was killed and hung on the fence, while Boatwhistle personally shot the Roper in the throat. The fighting only ended when the Jessups were wiped out and the fence knocked down. Knowing that Cooncat couldn’t have seen the two dead men at the General Store, Boatwhistle demands that he tell the truth. But Cooncat remains adamant in his story. He and Meagan both see two riders watching them from a distance, but a fed up Boatwhistle refuses to look.

At the barn-warming, Cooncat grows closer with Meagan, dancing with her. But during the celebrations, he spots the Smiling Man and the Roper again, watching from a distance. He slips outside to go and warn Horse but is stalked by the two strangers throughout the dark yard. Meagan catches up with him and makes him come back inside.

During the celebrations, Pat receives tragic news; his parents have been found murdered in their nearby home. As the timing of the crime matches with Cooncat’s arrival, the grief-stricken Pat accuses him of the murders and wants to hang him. But Horse refuses due to the lack of sufficient evidence. Feeling betrayed, Pat bans the Davis family from his property and has the fence rebuilt on the property line.

Horse refuses to turn to violence and plans to drive his cattle through the winter in the hopes that some will make it to Kansas alive, rather than have them all face certain death by remaining at the ranch. Abby decides to lead the farmhands to tear down the fence, despite Boatwhistle pleading with her to keep the peace. She tells Boatwhistle to stay at the homestead with Cooncat.

Abby’s farmhands tear down and burn the fenceposts, but she’s startled when she sees Pat approaching from a distance with a large number of his own men. She tries to signal to her men to retreat, but when she fires a shot into the air to get their attention, both sides mistake it as a shot fired at them and a violent gunfight erupts. During the fighting, Abby is wounded and Pat’s prize stud horse, Big Jim, is killed.

Abby’s pony returns riderless to the Davis homestead. Distraught by the blood on the saddle, Boatwhistle decides to ride out to help the Davis farmhands. He sends Cooncat to the bunkhouse to retrieve ammunition. But Cooncat discovers the Smiling Man sitting in the bunkhouse. Panicking, he runs back to Boatwhistle and asks if there was any Miles Jessup could have survived. But an exasperated Boatwhistle brushes him off and goes into the bunkhouse himself, despite Cooncat’s pleas. Inside, Boatwhistle is astonished to see the Smiling Man, who he recognizes as Miles Jessup. The Smiling Man shoots and kills Boatwhistle, before fleeing with the Roper. They leave Cooncat alive to take the blame for the murder. Cooncat runs inside the house to get the gun, but is too late to stop the pair. Realizing his situation, Cooncat flees.

The Davis family returns with a wounded Abby and discover the dead Boatwhistle. With Cooncat fled and the gun in the house missing, Horse concludes that he is the killer after all and arranges for a posse to run him down the next morning. But Cooncat secretly comes to Meagan’s bedroom window to protest his innocence. He guesses that the Smiling Man and the Roper were the ones that really killed Shell, shooting him while Cooncat was unconscious, before shovelling dust into the shop and burying signs of the camp to cover their tracks. He suspects that they hid Shell’s body somewhere in the General Store, and decides to go and search for it to help prove his innocence. Meagan accompanies him.

At the General Store, they find signs that support Cooncat’s story; bloodstains on the floor and indications that the dust came from outside. But none of it is enough to prove his innocence. They search all night but find no sign of Shell’s body. The Smiling Man suddenly appears and admits to the murder, revealing that they buried Shell’s body in a canyon some distance away. Cooncat struggles with the Smiling Man before he and Meagan flee into the brush. They manage to evade the Smiling Man and the Roper and hide inside the ruins. Meagan had left a note for Horse, telling him where they went. They decide to simply wait for him to arrive and tell their story.

The next morning, the Smiling Man and the Roper return to the General Store and hide inside. Horse, Pat, and two farmhands appear. Cooncat and Meagan, still hiding in the ruins, realize that the Smiling Man and the Roper plan to ambush Horse and Pat by waiting for them to draw close to the store before shooting them through the windows. Cooncat fires a shot near Horse to warn him, which the Smiling Man mistakes as coming from the ridge. Horse’s men return fire at the store, while Horse himself sneaks around behind. Cooncat realizes Horse only expects himself to be in the store with just one gun and is walking into a trap. With no other option, Cooncat breaks cover and runs into the crossfire, being struck and wounded. Realizing now there are multiple gunmen, Horse proceeds more cautiously into the store and holds the Smiling Man and the Roper at gunpoint. But Horse is startled when he sees the Smiling Man’s face and a brief struggle ensues. Horse manages to shoot the Roper dead, but the Smiling Man then holds him at gunpoint.

The Smiling Man is revealed to be Bob Jessup, the son of Miles Jessup, who had been serving a life sentence in prison and had presumably either escaped or was released early. Bob had grown up to be nearly identical to his father. The Roper is implied to have been the brother of the man Boatwhistle had killed. Bob had come to get revenge on the Davis family for killing his father and brother, and the Farrells (Pat’s parents) who had supported the Davis side in the feud.

The wounded Cooncat, having silently crawled into the store, tries to shoot Bob before he can shoot Horse. But Cooncat is out of bullets and the sound of his gun alerts Bob. Bob smiles and prepares to shoot Cooncat first. But he is shot dead through the door by Pat, who rushes in along with Meagan. Meagan goes to tend to Cooncat, while Pat helps Horse.

With Cooncat’s name cleared, a grateful Horse welcomes him into the family, saying "From now on, he’ll never without friends, or without a home."

== Cast ==
- John Barrymore Jr. as Cooncat
- Chill Wills as Boatwhistle
- John Archer as Pat Farrell
- Lois Butler as Meagan Davis
- Kristine Miller as Abby Davis
- Basil Ruysdael as "Horse" Davis
- Jack Elam as Smiling Man
- Dave Kashner as Roper
- Frank Cordell as Frank
- Clem Fuller as Dixie
- Hugh Aiken as Art Simms
- Howard Joslin as Jim Shell

== Production ==
The film was shot on location in Antelope Springs and Marfa, Presidio County, Texas.
