= Pontius Pilate (film) =

1962 film by Irving Rapper, Gian Paolo Callegari

- 1962 US theatrical poster
- Directed by: Gian Paolo Callegari; Irving Rapper
- Written by: Oreste Biancoli; Gian Paolo Callegari; Gino De Santis
- Produced by: Glomer Film, Lux Compagnie Cinématographique de France
- Starring: Jean Marais; Jeanne Crain; Basil Rathbone; Letícia Román; Massimo Serato; Riccardo Garrone; John Drew Barrymore
- Music by: Angelo Francesco Lavagnino
- Release dates: 15 February 1962 (Italy); 22 June 1962 (France)
- Running time: 100 minutes; 93 minutes (Spain); 103 minutes (West Germany)
- Countries: Italy, France
- Languages: Italian; French; English
- Box office: 1,455,058 admissions (France)

Pontius Pilate (Italian: Ponzio Pilato, French: Ponce Pilate) is an Italian drama film from 1962, directed by Gian Paolo Callegari and Irving Rapper, written by Oreste Biancoli, starring Jean Marais and Jeanne Crain.

The film is known under the titles: Ponce Pilate (France), Poncio Pilatos (Spain), Pontius Pilate (UK / US), Pontius Pilatus – Statthalter des Grauens (Germany).

John Drew Barrymore plays the characters of both Judas Iscariot and Jesus of Nazareth.

The scenario is based mainly on the Gospel of John. The following biblical passages are quoted in the film: Matthew 27:11; Mark 15:2; Luke 23:1; John 18:33; 18:37; John 18:38; 19:9-11; Matthew 27:24; Deuteronomy 21:6-7; John 19:19-21; 19:22.

This film takes a perspective on events surrounding the Passion of Jesus Christ by focusing on Pontius Pilate, the Procurator of Judea who condemned Him to death. Pilate is a man for whom nothing seems to go as planned.

The film was produced in Italy and released there on 15 February 1962.

== Plot ==
Pontius Pilate, on trial by Emperor Caligula for abuse of power, recounts the events that led to the crucifixion of Jesus Christ.

== Cast ==
- Jean Marais: Pontius Pilate
- Jeanne Crain: Claudia Procula
- Basil Rathbone: Caiaphas
- Letícia Román: Sarah
- John Drew Barrymore: Judas, Jesus
- Massimo Serato: Nicodemus
- Riccardo Garrone: Galba
- Livio Lorenzon: Barabbas
- Gianni Garko: Jonathan
- Roger Tréville: Aaron El Mesin
- Carlo Giustini: Decio
- Dante DiPaolo: Simone
- Paul Muller: Mehlik
- Alfredo Varelli: Joseph of Arimathea
- Manuela Ballard: Ester (as Manoela Ballard)
- Raffaella Carrà: Jessica
