= John Drew Barrymore =

American actor (1932–2004)

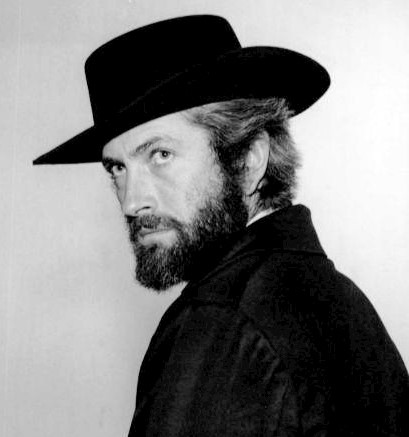
- Barrymore in 1964
- Born: John Blyth Barrymore Jr. June 4, 1932; Los Angeles, California, U.S.
- Died: November 29, 2004 (aged 72); Los Angeles, California, U.S.
- Other names: John Barrymore, Jr.
- Occupation: Actor
- Years active: 1949–1976
- Spouses: Cara Williams (m. 1953; div. 1959) Gabriella Palazzoli (m. 1960; div. 1970) Jaid Makó (m. 1971; div. 1984) Nina Wayne (m. 1985; div. 1994)
- Children: 4, including John & Drew
- Parent(s): John Barrymore; Dolores Costello
- Relatives: Diana Barrymore (half-sister)
- Family: Barrymore

John Drew Barrymore (born John Blyth Barrymore Jr.; June 4, 1932 – November 29, 2004) was an American actor and member of the Barrymore family of actors, which included his father, John Barrymore and his father's siblings, Lionel and Ethel. Early in his career, he was credited as John Barrymore, Jr. He was the father of four children, including the actor John Blyth Barrymore and the actress Drew Barrymore. Diana Barrymore was his half-sister from his father's second marriage.

== Early life ==
Barrymore was born in Los Angeles to John Barrymore (born John Blyth) and silent film actress Dolores Costello. His parents separated when he was 18 months old and he rarely saw his father afterward. Educated at private schools, one of the schools he attended was the Hollywood Professional School. His mother attempted to dissuade him from entering acting, sending him to St. John's Military Academy. In 1945, at age 13, Barrymore and his cousin Dirk Drew Davenport enlisted in the United States Navy to fight in World War II, posing as 17-year olds. As both were tall for their age, the military did not discover until several weeks later that the boys were below the minimum enlistment age and they were subsequently sent home.

== Career ==
=== First roles in the United States ===
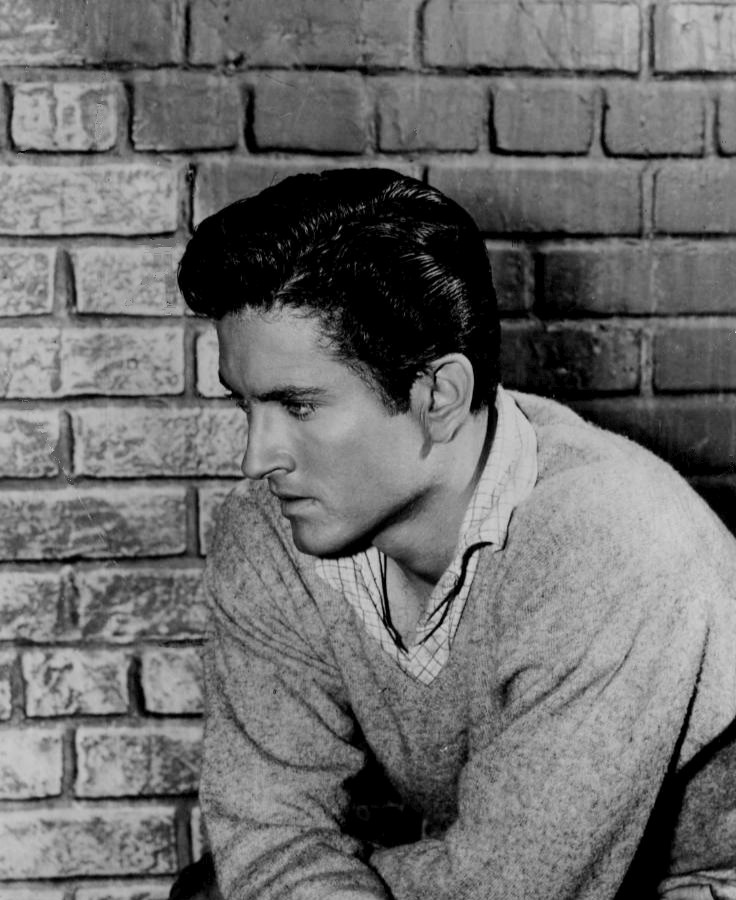
Barrymore in 1953

Barrymore's film career began with a small role in The Sundowners (1950), a Western with Robert Preston. Then aged 17, he was billed as John Barrymore Jr. Being a minor, he needed his mother's permission. His fee was $7,500. He was promoted to leading man in just his second movie, the Western High Lonesome (1950), written and directed by Alan Le May, who also wrote Barrymore's next film, Quebec (1951). He starred in The Big Night (1951), co-written and directed by Joseph Losey and was in Thunderbirds (1952) with John Derek at Republic. In 1953, he was briefly jailed for failing to appear on three old traffic charges.

Barrymore's films were not particularly successful. He moved into television, guest-starring on shows like Schlitz Playhouse and The 20th Century-Fox Hour. He performed in TV movies, including The Reluctant Redeemer (1954), The Adventures of Lt. Contee (1955) and appeared in several episodes of Matinee Theatre. In 1957 he directed an episode of Matinee Theatre, "One for All". "Television gives me the chance to do what movies didn't," he said. In 1955, Barrymore was sued by Lanny Budd Productions for not making a series of movies in Europe. Barrymore counter-sued.

Barrymore returned to features with supporting parts in While the City Sleeps (1956), directed by Fritz Lang, where he played the killer, and The Shadow on the Window (1957), where he played an antagonist. In 1957, he appeared in a production of Romeo and Juliet at the Pasadena Playhouse with Margaret O'Brien. He guest starred in Playhouse 90 (the original production of The Miracle Worker), Climax!, Westinghouse Desilu Playhouse and Wagon Train.

In 1958, he changed his middle name to Drew. He had a supporting role in High School Confidential! (1958) at MGM and the lead in Never Love a Stranger and MGM's interracial drama, Night of the Quarter Moon (1959) with Julie London. In December 1958, he was sentenced to three weekends in prison after a drunken public fight with his wife in a parking lot. In January 1959, his ex-wife sued for nonpayment of alimony. In March 1959, he was arrested for suspected hit-and-run drunk driving. In October 1959, he quit the touring company of Look Homeward, Angel after a week and a half of rehearsals.

=== European films ===
Barrymore traveled to Italy to star in The Cossacks (1960) with Edmund Purdom. He stayed in Italy for the next few years with lead or main cast roles, including appearances in The Night They Killed Rasputin (1960, playing Felix Yusupov), The Pharaohs' Woman (1961), The Centurion (1961), The Trojan Horse (1961, playing Ulysses), Pontius Pilate (1961, playing both Judas and Jesus), Invasion 1700 (1962) and Rome Against Rome (1964).

During his five years in Europe, Barrymore appeared in the UK film The Christine Keeler Story (1963, filmed in Denmark) as Stephen Ward.

=== Return to the United States ===
Barrymore returned to Los Angeles. He announced he made 16 films abroad, but "I'm not going to do anything bad any more. I feel I'm straightened out and down the block. Somewhere around the block I lost half my ego, so I don't work for applause." He also said he had started to write scripts. He guest starred on episodes of various television series, including Gunsmoke, Rawhide, The Wild Wild West, Run for Your Life, Jericho and Dundee and the Culhane and appeared in the 1967 television film Winchester '73.

Barrymore's antisocial and erratic behavior continued to obstruct his professional progress. In the 1960s, he was occasionally incarcerated for drug use, public drunkenness and spousal abuse. In 1964, he went to prison for possession of marijuana.

In 1966, Barrymore was cast in the role of Lazarus in the Star Trek: The Original Series episode The Alternative Factor but did not show up on the first day of shooting; Robert Brown replaced him at the last minute. Barrymore was suspended from SAG for six months after the Star Trek production filed a grievance. After the suspension was served to him in 1967, Barrymore's on-screen work became sporadic, sometimes with a few years between appearances.

In 1967, he was imprisoned for possession of drugs following a car crash. In 1969, he was again arrested for possession of drugs after another car accident.

=== Later years and death ===
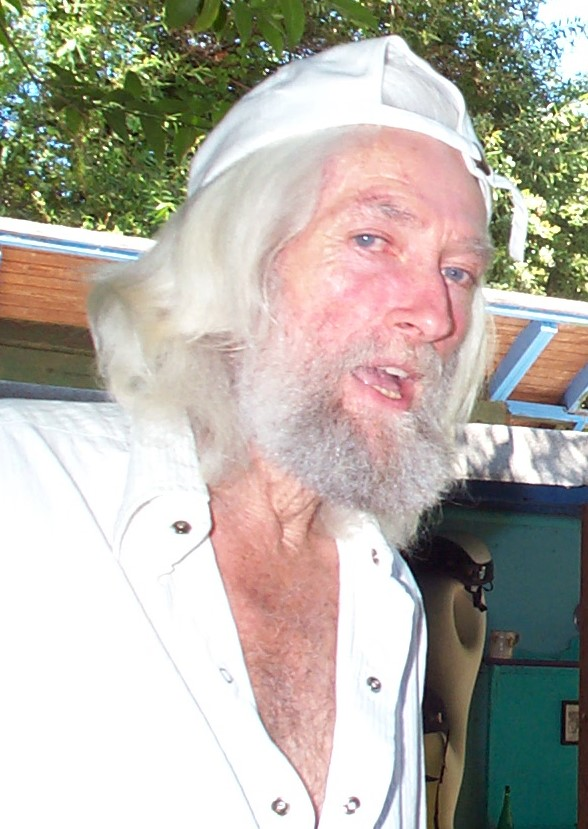
Barrymore in 2001

Barrymore eventually withdrew from acting, with his final two appearances being a 1974 episode of Kung Fu and an uncredited role in the 1976 film Baby Blue Marine. Barrymore had the same addiction problems that had destroyed his father. Although he continued to appear occasionally onscreen, he became reclusive. He was estranged from his family, including his children and his lifestyle continued to worsen as his physical and mental health deteriorated.

In 2003, his daughter Drew moved him near her home, despite their estrangement. She paid his medical bills until his death from cancer the following year at age 72. She spread his ashes at Joshua Tree National Park, John's favorite place. He has a star on the Hollywood Walk of Fame for his contributions to television.

== Personal life ==
All of Barrymore's marriages ended in divorce. His first marriage was to actress Cara Williams in 1952; they had one child, John Blyth Barrymore (b. 1954), before they divorced in 1959. A year later, in 1960, Barrymore married Gabriella Palazzoli. Their daughter, Blyth Dolores Barrymore, was born that same year. Their marriage lasted 10 years before ending in divorce in 1970.

- Cara Williams (1953–1959) (divorced) (1 child)
  - John Blyth Barrymore III, born May 15, 1954
- Gabriella Palazzoli (1960–1970) (divorced) (1 child)
  - Blyth Dolores Barrymore, born October 28, 1962
- Ildiko Jaid Mako (1971–1984) (divorced) (1 child)
  - Drew Barrymore, born February 22, 1975
- Nina Wayne (1985–1994) (divorced) (1 child)
  - Brahma Jessica Blyth Barrymore (1966–2014)

== Filmography ==
- The Sundowners (1950) – Jeff Cloud, the Younger Brother
- High Lonesome (1950) – Cooncat
- Quebec (1951) – Mark Douglas
- The Big Night (1951) – George La Main
- Thunderbirds (1952) – Pvt. Tom McCreery
- While the City Sleeps (1956) – Robert Manners
- The Shadow on the Window (1957) – Jess Reber
- High School Confidential (1958) – J.I. Coleridge
- Never Love a Stranger (1958) – Francis 'Frankie' Kane
- Desilu Playhouse (1958, episode: "Silent Thunder")
- Wagon Train (1958, episode: "The Ruttledge Munroe Story") – Ruttledge Munroe
- Rawhide (1959–1965, TV series) – Danny Hawks / Harry Eccles / Harry Tasunka
- Night of the Quarter Moon (1959) – Roderic 'Chuck' Nelson
- The Cossacks (1960) – Jamal
- The Night They Killed Rasputin (1960) – Prince Felix Yousoupoff
- Ti aspetterò all'inferno (1960) – Walter
- The Pharaohs' Woman (1960) – Sabaku prince of Bubastis
- The Centurion (1961) – Diaeus
- The Trojan Horse (1961) – Ulysses
- Pontius Pilate (1962) – Judas / Jesus
- Invasion 1700 (1962) – Bohun
- Weapons of War (1963) – Lotario Duchesca
- The Keeler Affair (1963) – Dr. Stephen Ward
- Natika (1963)
- Rome Against Rome (AKA War of the Zombies) (1964) – Aderbad
- Death on the Four Poster (1964) – Anthony
- Crimine a due (1964) – Paul Morand
- The Wild Wild West (1965, episode: "The Night of the Double-Edged Knife") – American Knife
- Gunsmoke (1965, TV series) – Mace Gore / Anderson
- Winchester '73 (1967, TV movie) – Preacher
- Clones (1973) – Brooks Brothers Hippie
- Kung Fu (1974, episode: "A Dream Within a Dream") – Alex McGregor
- Baby Blue Marine (1976)
