= Lasagna Cat =

Parody web series

- Genre: Black comedy Parody; Surreal comedy Psychological horror
- Created by: Zachary Johnson; Jeffrey Max
- Based on: Garfield by Jim Davis
- Country of origin: United States
- Original language: English
- No. of seasons: 2
- No. of episodes: 40

Production
- Production company: Fatal Farm

Original release
- Network: YouTube
- Release: January 14, 2008 – February 23, 2017

Lasagna Cat is a web series created by production company Fatal Farm as a parody of the Garfield comic strips created by American cartoonist Jim Davis. The series was uploaded in bulk to YouTube in 2008 and 2017, and consists mainly of humorous live-action recreations of nostalgic Garfield comics.

== Format ==
The majority of Lasagna Cat consists of live-action reenactments of the Garfield comic strips, featuring costumed performers in the roles of Jon Arbuckle, Garfield, and Odie. Each reenactment is followed by a surreal "interlude" segment, related to themes or dialogue found in the original adapted strip. This can either be a music video set to a copyrighted song, or a different form of satirical skit. After which, a smiling mugshot of cartoonist Jim Davis is shown, sometimes edited to fit the scenario. Most of the series' videos are only a few minutes long, with the exception of "07/27/1978" and "Sex Survey Results", which are one and five hours long, respectively. The series exists mainly to satirize the original Garfield comics' style of humor and as a surreal tribute to Davis.

== Episodes ==
Season	Episodes	Originally released	
Season	Episodes	First released	Last released
1	27	January 14, 2008	January 14, 2008
2	13	February 23, 2017	February 23, 2017

=== Season 1 (2008) ===
No. overall	No. in season	Title	Runtime	Original release date
1	1	"08/18/1978"	1:39	January 14, 2008
Reenacts a strip in which Garfield tries to hit Odie with a giant bone, before being caught by Jon Arbuckle and pretending to use the bone as a backscratcher. The scene transitions to a parody of the game Final Fantasy VI, with Garfield and a dish of lasagna fighting Jon and Odie. Garfield attacks Odie with a bone spell, but Jon defeats him using a "Mondays" attack. The lasagna uses an attack that revives Garfield and defeats Jon and Odie. Upon winning, Garfield has "Told 1 Hilarious Joke", "Found 4 Licensing Deals", and has Garfield creator Jim Davis join the party. The player pauses the game and selects Davis' skills menu, only to find it will not open. Song: "Final Fantasy VI Medley" by Nobuo Uematsu
2	2	"05/14/1979"	1:16	January 14, 2008
Recreates a strip in which Garfield eats so much that his legs no longer touch the ground. The obese Garfield and his empty food dish, along with a glass of wine, are displayed in front of several David of Michelangelo sculptures. Garfield repeats the line "what a great meal" from the strip, and a picture of Jim Davis is displayed between two statues. Song: "Canon in D Major" by Johann Pachelbel
3	3	"04/25/1979"	1:30	January 14, 2008
Recreates a strip in which Garfield finds a dog whistle and blows into it. Hearing no sound, he concludes that it is broken while a nearby Odie shivers. The scene transitions to a 70's styled show called "The Garfield and Odie Music Special", where Garfield and Odie play the theme from the TV series Taxi on several instruments, including the dog whistle. The scene fades to Jim Davis' face. Song: "Angela (Theme from Taxi)" by Bob James
4	4	"02/24/1979"	1:29	January 14, 2008
Recreates a strip in which Jon confronts Garfield about knocking his plant off of a windowsill, Garfield playing innocent by hugging his teddy bear. Spandau Ballet's "True" plays as Garfield is imprisoned for lying to Jon. Jim Davis' face appears. Song: "True" by Spandau Ballet
5	5	"05/22/1980"	4:15	January 14, 2008
Recreates a strip in which Garfield begs for some of Jon's lasagna. When Jon tries to get him to talk about his addiction to the food, Garfield demands that Jon feed him first. Multiple reviews of the film Garfield: The Movie, all deriding it as decent at best, are shown, before showing reviews of Garfield: A Tail of Two Kitties that praise it above the first film, devolving into poorly written reviews from Amazon, a review of the quality of the DVD case, and the runtime as listed on IMDb. The screen darkens and ominous music plays as Jim Davis' face fades in, then slowly fades out. Song: "Jurassic Park theme" by John Williams
6	6	"05/16/1987"	1:34	January 14, 2008
Recreates a strip in which Garfield notes that one never loses fat in the right places. He imagines himself losing all the fat in his neck but keeping his stomach, and observes that fat "has a sick sense of humor." A music video set to Johnny Mandel's "Suicide is Painless" shows the half-skinny version of Garfield hatching from an egg, before Garfield himself is crucified while Jon and Odie watch. The strip is shown with a discolored background and all of the thought bubbles filled in with parts of Jim Davis' face, followed by three Garfields, all with Davis' smile, and three pictures of Davis with a third eye open on his forehead that vanish in puffs of smoke. Song: "Suicide Is Painless" by Johnny Mandel
7	7	"05/16/1985"	1:15	January 14, 2008
Recreates a strip in which Jon watches a flailing Garfield, believing him to be dancing. When asked how to dance like that, Garfield tells Jon he sat on a bur in his sandbox. Garfield "dances" to Tom Jones' "She's a Lady" as Jon repeats the line "that's a pretty funky dance, Garfield. Show me how you do it!" before the text "Show Me How You Do It, Garfield." appears, and the screen fades to Jim Davis' face. Song: "She's a Lady" by Tom Jones
8	8	"12/03/1991"	1:20	January 14, 2008
Recreates a strip in which Garfield watches Jon excitedly make toast for fun. An old television set sits in a forest surrounded by trash bags, showing Jon making toast while American imagery flashes by. The text "GARFIELD! AMERICA'S FAVORITE CAT" is shown over a picture of Mount Rushmore, where Jim Davis' face has replaced George Washington's. Song: "Chattahoochee" by Alan Jackson
9	9	"01/24/1994"	1:33	January 14, 2008
Recreates a strip in which Garfield and Jon sit around, bored. Jon mutters "ah, yes, life goes on," and Garfield asks "where?" The middle panel of the strip fades into live action. The strip's recreation plays again, now with Mariah Carey's "Hero" playing and lit by candles. When Garfield looks at the camera, Jim Davis' face eclipses the screen. Song: "Hero" by Mariah Carey
10	10	"01/26/1995"	1:24	January 14, 2008
Recreates a strip in which Garfield drinks coffee. He notes that one more cup would probably be too much, but drinks it anyway, causing his eyes to bug out. Billy Idol's "Eyes Without a Face" plays as Garfield's pupils switch eyes. His eyes and nose grow while his tail rises straight up, and the eyes eventually fall out of their sockets and roll away. Jim Davis' picture is shown, the pupils initially askew before moving back to their natural positions. Song: "Eyes Without a Face" by Billy Idol
11	11	"03/08/1997"	1:11	January 14, 2008
Recreates a strip in which Garfield tries to prove Jon's claim that he pays no attention to him wrong. He throws out a compliment, but it turns out he is talking to a lamp that he has mistook for Jon. A music video set to Limp Bizkit's "Red Light Green Light" plays, the lamp changing colors in sync with the lyrics. Jim Davis' face is shown split down the middle, one half red and the other green, and is listed by onscreen text as "Cat Killa Jim Davis". Song: "Red Light – Green Light" by Limp Bizkit and Snoop Dogg
12	12	"01/19/1987"	1:24	January 14, 2008
Recreates a strip in which Jon wakes Garfield up to announce that he will be growing a mustache, which Garfield blames on it being Monday. The strip is remixed to The Bangles' "Manic Monday" showing Jon cycling through different mustaches, Garfield himself growing one, before Jon grows one in earnest and the text "You did it, Jon" appears. Jim Davis himself is shown with a mustache. Song: "Manic Monday" by The Bangles
13	13	"03/24/1979"	1:30	January 14, 2008
Recreates a strip in which Jon manipulates Garfield into dancing for him by threatening to give Odie his attention. A music video recreation set to Enrique Iglesias' "Bailamos" plays as several of the lines from the strip are repeated onscreen in Spanish. The screen bursts into flame, and Jim Davis' face can be seen. Song: "Bailamos" by Enrique Iglesias
14	14	"04/04/2001"	1:48	January 14, 2008
Recreates a strip in which Jon shows Garfield a diagram of the food chain to try and get him to chase mice. Garfield asks where pizza is on the chain. A dramatic reenactment set to Exposé's "I'll Never Get Over Getting Over You" plays, and Jim Davis' face fades in from a serene blue background. Song: "I'll Never Get Over You Getting Over Me" by Exposé
15	15	"10/25/2004"	1:28	January 14, 2008
Recreates a strip in which Jon describes something as big, orange and fat, only to reveal he was talking about a pumpkin. In space, Jon offers Garfield the Earth before a flash of light creates a gigantic version of the pumpkin. The word "FANTASTIC" appears over a picture of Jim Davis' face. Song: "A Whole New World" as performed by Peabo Bryson and Regina Belle
16	16	"01/05/2005"	1:14	January 14, 2008
Recreates a strip in which Jon scolds Garfield for his excessive sleeping habits, which Garfield passes off as him being "frisky." In a jungle, Jon again accuses Garfield of sleeping as Garfield floats down a river on a raft, past animals, Jon, Odie, and the posters for both of the Garfield movies. When Garfield reaches his hand up, he touches a picture of Jim Davis, covered in vines. Song: "The Lion Sleeps Tonight" by The Tokens
17	17	"05/20/2005"	1:39	January 14, 2008
Recreates a strip in which Jon bemoans his loneliness, causing Garfield to leave in annoyance. Jon repeats the word "lonely" over several wild west settings, before pictures of him and Garfield are shown transposed into Western times, before showing Jon at a bar, still repeating "lonely." A map of the area is seen, before zooming out to show it forms Jim Davis' face. Song: "Desperado" by The Eagles; Note: This was removed from YouTube due to a copyright claim.
18	18	"02/24/2006"	1:25	January 14, 2008
Recreates a strip in which Jon receives a phone call from a woman saying she will not go out with him. When he asks who is calling, Garfield notes "the entire female population." In a black and white sequence, a lonely Jon stays in his apartment, becoming increasingly distraught as he fails to get a date while Garfield watches. A black and white photo of Jim Davis is shown. Song: "Come to My Window" by Melissa Etheridge
19	19	"06/01/1982"	1:05	January 14, 2008
Recreates a strip in which Garfield grabs hold of Odie's wagging tail, which ends up wagging him around. A music video set to Los Del Rio's "Macarena" plays, resplendent in maraca and sombrero imagery. The screen shuts itself off, before turning back on to Jim Davis' face. Song: "Macarena" by Los Del Rio
20	20	"08/15/2006"	1:34	January 14, 2008
Recreates a strip in which Jon states he is in the mood to party, or fold laundry. Garfield notes that there is no difference in Jon's world. A dramatic recreation plays to Van Halen's "Right Now", posing the question of whether or not Jon would like to party or fold laundry. The text "RIGHT NOW, THERE IS NO DIFFERENCE IN JON'S WORLD. RIGHT NOW, JIM DAVIS IS MAKING US SMILE." appears over a picture of Jim Davis' face. Song: "Right Now" by Van Halen
21	21	"09/15/2006"	1:11	January 14, 2008
Recreates a strip in which Garfield eats a cake that hasn't risen yet, and Jon confronts him. However, Jon is caught off guard when Garfield's face suddenly expands. The text appears on a black screen, explaining the joke, before proceeding with paper notes that describe the recipe for a chocolate cake. The final note was a pencil drawing of Jim Davis' face. Song: "One Week" by Barenaked Ladies
22	22	"04/16/2007"	1:14	January 14, 2008
Recreates a strip in which Jon whistles a tune. Garfield slaps him on the back of his head, because Jon was "whistling off-key". Jon and Garfield are featured on baseball cards, with Garfield listed as one of the famous hitters. In a baseball game, Garfield hits Jon with the sound of a bat hitting a ball and the crowd cheering. After Jon accuses Garfield of being mean, the scene fades to black and a picture of Jim Davis appears. Song: "Hit Me with Your Best Shot" by Pat Benatar
23	23	"04/20/2007"	1:13	January 14, 2008
Recreates a strip in which Garfield pretends to read a newspaper, but later admits that he was only trying to appear well-informed. Under the flashing spotlight, Garfield's "illusion" is mashed with Snap!'s "The Power", followed by scream bubbles with slogans such as "READING IS COOL!" or "GET A LIBRARY CARD!" Finally, Jim Davis' face appears in one of the bubbles. Song: "The Power" by Snap!
24	24	"06/15/2007"	1:10	January 14, 2008
Recreates a strip in which Liz tried to offer Garfield some moral support because of his unpleasant diet. However, when she tried to find her purse, Garfield informed her that he had eaten it. As epileptic, flashing lights constantly illuminate the scene, the words "GARFIELD IS ON A DIET" scroll by, followed by Garfield with miniature purses flying out of his mouth. He hides in and out of a larger purse several times, until the song ends and Jim Davis' face appears. Song: "Emerge" by Fischerspooner
25	25	"10/26/2007"	1:21	January 14, 2008
Recreates a strip in which Garfield encounters a haunted hamburger, but instead of being scared, he is disappointed because he was also expecting french fries. A pixelated Garfield dances to "Cheeseburger in Paradise," then the scene transitions to the text "GARFEILDS GOES HAMBRAGER CRAZY!" As a text-to-speech program repeats the nouns from the comic strip, more retro pixel art appears on the screen, such as Garfield and hamburger in sunglasses, a window from a Windows 98 game called "Garfield's Fun Adventures," a Garfield "garffiti," etc. Jim Davis' face changes size to the music as a text-to-speech program distorts the pronunciation of Garfield's name for the last time. The visuals for this episode were inspired by Neil Cicierega's early works. Song: "Cheeseburger in Paradise" (MIDI) by Jimmy Buffett
26	26	"11/01/2007"	1:40	January 14, 2008
Recreates a strip in which Odie hugs Garfield. Garfield notes that Odie is very loyal, but he is unsure if this is good or bad. Odie embraces Garfield for a full minute in a living room. The camera slowly zooms in on them, then switches focus on a picture frame where Jim Davis' face replaces Garfield's image. Song: "Ebony and Ivory" by Paul McCartney and Stevie Wonder
27	27	"04/08/1998"	1:23	January 14, 2008
Recreates a strip in which Jon brushes his hair, but to his horror, he realizes he was using a cat brush all along. Garfield jokes that he didn't react so intensely when he used Jon's toothbrush. The scene shakes and lights flash, and Garfield and Jon appear in gothic costumes. Crows fly over the action, and Jon stands naked, wearing black glasses. The words "GARFIELD" and "CAT BRUSH" are written on his chest. Jim Davis' image, also in gothic garb, appears after a crow passes over him. Song: "Head Like a Hole" by Nine Inch Nails

=== Season 2 (2017) ===
No. overall	No. in season	Title	Runtime	Original release date
28	1	"07/27/1978"	1:01:24	February 23, 2017
Recreates a strip in which Jon looks for his pipe, only to find Garfield smoking it. Actor John Blyth Barrymore discusses this strip for a full hour, talking about the meaning of the words, the way the strip is drawn, historical corruption within smoking industries, and how Garfield strips parallel his own personal life experiences. Barrymore concludes that Garfield's impact is so powerful it can transcend time and space, as does Jim Davis. The screen fades out, leaving only Davis' picture with a quote from Oscar Wilde: "It is through art, and through art only, that we can realize our perfection." Song: The entire score to Kundun by Philip Glass
29	2	"10/20/1984"	5:28	February 23, 2017
Recreates a strip in which Jon shows Garfield his new picture frame, which Odie happens to be behind. Garfield panics, believing it to be a mirror. The scene transitions to a parody of the show Miami Vice called Lasagna Cat, with Garfield as James Crockett and Odie as Ricardo Tubbs, recreating the "In the Air Tonight" sequence, the song off-key and covered by voice actor Justin Roiland. Garfield attacks an older, balder Jon for letting him think the frame was a mirror before Odie pulls him off. The two drive to a phone booth, where Garfield calls Jon to confirm that the picture frame was not a mirror. Garfield and Odie drive to a boat and force a man onto it a gunpoint, driving off in the boat. Jim Davis' face is placed over a Miami Vice character with the text "OH LORD..." seen in the bottom right corner. Song: "In the Air Tonight" by Phil Collins (performed by Justin Roiland) Note: This video is a direct parody of the famous "In the Air Tonight" scene from the pilot episode of Miami Vice.
30	3	"02/26/2003"	2:01	February 23, 2017
Recreates a strip in which Jon announces his plans to spend the evening trying out different shampoos. Garfield notes that one of the bottles is furniture polish. The scene transitions to a sexually suggestive scene of Jon being coated in shampoo from bottles held at the crotches of several Asian men, Jon himself speaking Japanese. The bottles are pixelated, just like genitalia in Japanese pornography. The scene halts when one man rings a gong, and Nermal appears, dressed as a geisha, pouring a bottle of furniture polish on Jon. Jon proclaims it to be the best one as the men applaud. Japanese credits roll as Odie mops up the floor. The bucket holding his water has Jim Davis' face on it. Song: "Cream" by Prince
31	4	"12/04/1980"	3:53	February 23, 2017
Recreates a strip in which a bored Garfield gets in a fight with Odie. He leaves the fight, beaten but still bored. Over Lasagna Chat, Garfield (screen name "lazycat619") asks Odie ("darthmauldog1125") if he finished editing their fight. Odie emails him the file, and they both turn their cameras on, revealing them wearing human clothing and walking upright. The "fight" is a cheesily made video of Garfield and Odie brawling in a backyard, shooting at each other with toy guns and edited in laser beams. They discuss sending it to Sundance Film Festival and Vin Diesel, before Odie leaves to upload it to YouTube. Garfield closes the call and looks for nude pictures of actress Olivia Munn on "hotnudecelebritynudity.com", but is stopped by dozens of pictures of Jim Davis that appear, encouraging him to "Click here for more cat antics!" Song: "Firestarter" by The Prodigy
32	5	"06/08/2001"	1:55	February 23, 2017
Recreates a strip in which Garfield encourages Odie to "accessorize" his appearance by putting a bag over his head. Odie becomes a famous model because of this style, eventually spiraling into depression and committing suicide by slashing his wrists with a piece of broken mirror. When he arrives in Heaven, Saint Peter, played by Garfield, sends him to Hell for having a bag on his head, where he is attacked by multiple insect-like creatures that resemble Jon. The flaming word "BAG" is shown, before we see a picture of Jim Davis, also aflame, which burns away. Song: "Bad Romance" by Lady Gaga
33	6	"12/20/1996"	0:49	February 23, 2017
Recreates a strip in which Jon punishes Garfield for opening his Christmas present early by putting nothing in the present. A direct recreation of the YouTube video "Colin's Bear Animation" follows, in which a 3D model of Garfield dances to "Funky Monkey Dance" from the Mother 3 soundtrack. Dozens of pictures of Jim Davis are seen, their faces distorting in time with the music. Song: "Funky Monkey Dance" from Mother 3 by Shogo Sakai
34	7	"06/19/2002"	2:05	February 23, 2017
Recreates a strip in which a cupcake approaches Garfield on his birthday, revealed to be a mouse in lingerie surprising him. Garfield refuses to eat the cupcake. Garfield, alone on his birthday, calls a contact in his phone labeled "WALKING CUPCAKE", who repeats the line "happy birthday, big guy!" to him. A music video set to 50 Cent's "In da Club" plays, where Garfield drinks, smokes and snorts catnip, and brandishes a pistol while the mouse twerks for and performs oral sex on him while he watches Scarface. Jon also tries to drink, but vomits in the toilet. The words "CONGRATULATIONS FOR YOUR CAT CARTOON" appear, and a photo of Jim Davis wearing a birthday hat is seen. Song: "In da Club" by 50 Cent
35	8	"08/14/1986"	1:35	February 23, 2017
Recreates a strip in which Jon tells Garfield he is sleeping with socks on, which Garfield finds funny, deeming Jon crazy for it. Jon is being held in an asylum, wearing socks while also wearing a straitjacket. He puts socks on a Garfield doll and hallucinates it walking around, writes lines from the strip in his own feces before eating it, and makes his hand into a sock puppet before smashing it with a hammer. He is restrained by orderlies as Garfield lobotomizes him with a power drill. A printer prints a black and white photo of Jim Davis. Song: "Fergalicious" by Fergie; Note: This video was removed from YouTube for graphic content.
36	9	"02/18/2009"	1:58	February 23, 2017
Recreates a strip in which Jon, bored from being on hold in a phone call, starts singing along with the music playing, loudly singing until the person calls back in. A music video set to Kenny G's "Songbird" plays, with Odie accompanying poorly on the soprano saxophone. In it, Garfield offers the viewer a picnic with him, while Jon, still on the phone, eats a meal with Odie. Eventually, Jon gets through to the person on the other end, and it is revealed that he is calling Jim Davis. Jon whispers "thank you" to a confused Davis. Song: "Songbird" by Kenny G
37	10	"03/28/1992"	1:44	February 23, 2017
Recreates a strip in which Garfield gives up tying Jon's shoelaces together in favor of tying his shoes behind his head. In a 1920's film set in Loew's State Theatre, Jon performs "MR. FUNNY MAN: FORGING NEW FRONTIERS" with Garfield operating the curtains and Odie playing piano. He walks in a loop using only his fingers as the audience watches on unimpressed. The papers deem "Mr. Funny Man" a smash hit, crediting Jim Davis for its success. Song: "The Entertainer" by Scott Joplin
38	11	"11/19/1979"	1:34	February 23, 2017
Recreates a strip in which Garfield sneezes while Jon has breakfast, the force of the sneeze putting bacon over Jon's lips and eggs over his eyes. Jon is shown living in a town made entirely of breakfast food with a bagel neighbor while the song "Breakfast at Tiffany's" by Deep Blue Something plays. The lyric "And I said what about breakfast at Tiffany's" is dubbed as "breakfast with Garfield". A giant Garfield appears and sneezes, destroying the town and making Jon's head explode. The contact information of a PAWS, INC. employee appears, telling the viewer to contact them regarding arranging a breakfast with Garfield. In the town's rubble, a TV plays a newscast (the anchors being a danish and a banana) that report on "the cat sneezed", and the TV changes the channel to a picture of Jim Davis, the background made of breakfast food. Song: "Breakfast at Tiffany's" by Deep Blue Something; Note: This video was removed from YouTube for containing the personal information of a Paws, Inc. employee.
39	12	"07/30/2000"	2:12	February 23, 2017
Recreates a strip in which Odie orders something online using a computer. Jon checks the browser to find the website "www.dingleball.com". In cyberspace, Odie and Jon don futuristic metal outfits. Odie orders something off of dingleball.com, and Jon receives a call about it, but is too late to cancel the order. He and Odie fight a giant robotic Garfield with laser pistols, destroying it. A text-to-speech voice says "for the funniest comics in the world, visit www.garfield.com" as a cube containing pictures of Jim Davis floats in the air and the text "garfcom.biz" appears. Song: "Home Computer" by Kraftwerk
40	13	"Sex Survey Results"	4:40:52	February 23, 2017
For four and a half hours, Jon, Odie and Garfield are seen sitting in a chair, reading the paper, and answering their front door to see a mannequin. They rotate in the order of Jon, Garfield, Odie. The mannequin plays audio collected from hundreds of phone calls made to a phone line set up by Lasagna Cat's creators, in which the caller was asked to state their name and number of sexual partners. When they receive a knock on the door, Garfield and Jon asks "who's there?" and "[name] who?" when the knocker states their name. Near the end, Jon ends up answering the door for an identical version of himself, who proclaims he has had two sexual partners. The Jon inside the house laughs mockingly and says that he has had zero before shutting the door in his face. The Jon outside, now balding and older, stares at an orange cat in the windowsill as it gets up and walks away. Quotes of Jim Davis talking about Garfield and its impact begin to play as Jon wanders the city streets, noticing a female mannequin moving a male mannequin in a wheelchair around. The two stare at Jon, and the male mannequin drops a briefcase. Jon grabs and opens it, finding a stuffed, snarling orange cat. As he walks away, the statue seems to follow him. Jon is then seen climbing a mountain. When he reaches the top, he sees a near-naked man painted to look like Garfield standing at the top, who vanishes and reappears behind him before running towards Jon. When he touches Jon, he disappears again, then reappears behind him. The man whispers in Jon's ear, causing Jon to vanish, save for his clothes, leaving only dirt and worms behind. The man screams, which transitions into a young Polish woman screaming as she gives painful birth in a school bathroom stall, leaving the baby in the toilet. She looks at the child in disgust as she monologues in Polish, denouncing it being hers, claiming she is cursed, calling the situation a "sick joke" at which "no one is laughing," states that she is in Hell, and leaves. The baby is revealed to be male, wearing a blue shirt as an orange cat walks across the toilet and out of sight. The disembodied voice of Jim Davis says "humor is such a subjective thing. I don't know that any one person really knows what's funny." The baby opens its eyes for a split second before the screen cuts to bright orange. Songs (uncredited): "A Whiff of Perfume" by Heinz Kiessling and Werner Tautz; "The Ego" by Didier Goret; "L'Espace Temps" by Bernard Parmegiani

== Reception ==
Lasagna Cat was well received, with reviewers praising its insight into Garfield and comedy in general. It has been seen as a part of the widespread trend of "weird" Garfield internet memes, with Smithsonian in particular citing it as an example of people who "have taken up the challenge of making Garfield funny."

=== Legacy ===
A popular parody Twitter account was created in response to "07/27/1978", an hour-long episode (set to Philip Glass' score to the 1997 film Kundun) in which actor John Blyth Barrymore philosophically monologues about his adoration and obsession with a Garfield strip published on that date. Additionally, the series was cited as an inspiration in the creation of the Adult Swim short Too Many Cooks.
