= The Great Diamond Robbery =

1954 film by Robert Zigler Leonard

- DVD Cover
- Directed by: Robert Z. Leonard
- Written by: László Vadnay; Martin Rackin; George Oppenheimer
- Produced by: Edwin H. Knopf
- Starring: Red Skelton; James Whitmore; Cara Williams; Reginald Owen
- Cinematography: Joseph Ruttenberg
- Edited by: George White
- Music by: Rudolph G. Kopp
- Production company: Metro-Goldwyn-Mayer
- Distributed by: Loew's Inc.
- Release dates: January 8, 1954 (Premiere-Los Angeles); January 29, 1954 (US)
- Running time: 70 minutes
- Country: United States
- Language: English
- Budget: $858,000
- Box office: $702,000

The Great Diamond Robbery is a 1954 American comedy film directed by Robert Z. Leonard and starring Red Skelton, James Whitmore, Cara Williams and Reginald Owen. It was produced and distributed by Metro-Goldwyn-Mayer.

== Plot ==
A diamond potentially worth $2 million, the "Blue Goddess," must be cut. A New York City jeweler, Bainbridge Gibbons, has an expert lined up, but his own diamond cutter, Ambrose C. Park, strongly urges Gibbons to let him do the cutting.

On a park bench, Ambrose explains to a stranger that he places a newspaper ad once a year, on his birthday, and sits here hoping to be reunited with the parents who abandoned him in this very spot as an infant. He doesn't even know his real name; he was dubbed "Ambrose Central Park" at an orphanage.

Ambrose is arrested after inadvertently becoming drunk in public. A shyster lawyer, Remlick, offers to help for $400, then takes a greater interest when Ambrose offers to pay much more if his parents could be located. A couple of con artists become involved, with nightclub dancer Maggie Drumman and her mother Emily hired to pretend to be Ambrose's real sister and mom.

After the crooks try to steal the diamond, Ambrose accidentally cuts it in half, perfectly. He swallows one half, Maggie the other. As the crooks are taken away, Ambrose and Maggie go to have their stomachs pumped. A romantic attraction develops and all is forgiven.

== Cast ==
- Red Skelton as Ambrose C. Park
- Cara Williams as Maggie
- James Whitmore as Remlick
- Kurt Kasznar as Tony Midelli/Louie
- Dorothy Stickney as Emily
- George Mathews as Duke Fargoh
- Reginald Owen as Bainbridge Gibbons
- Harry Bellaver as Herb
- Connie Gilchrist as Blonde
- Steven Geray as Van Goosen
- Sig Arno as Mr. Sahutsky
- Olan Soule as Mr. Heinsdorfer
- Jean Fenwick as Secretary
- Matt Moore as Preacher
- Anna Q. Nilsson as Nurse
- Pat O'Malley as Policeman

== Reception ==
According to MGM records the movie earned $501,000 in the US and Canada and $201,000 elsewhere, making a loss to the studio of $426,000.
