= Alan Le May =

American novelist (1899–1964)

- Born: June 3, 1899; Indianapolis, Indiana, U.S.
- Died: April 27, 1964 (aged 64)
- Occupation: Writer (novelist)
- Writing career
- Period: 20th century
- Genre: Western fiction

Alan Brown Le May (June 3, 1899 – April 27, 1964) was an American novelist and screenplay writer.

Two of his Western novels, The Searchers (1954) and The Unforgiven (1957) were adapted into the motion pictures The Searchers (1956; starring John Wayne and Jeffrey Hunter, and directed by John Ford) and The Unforgiven (1960; starring Burt Lancaster and Audrey Hepburn, and directed by John Huston).

He also wrote or co-wrote the screenplays for North West Mounted Police (1940; directed by Cecil B. DeMille, and starring Gary Cooper and Paulette Goddard), Reap the Wild Wind (1942; directed by Cecil B. DeMille, and starring Ray Milland, John Wayne and Paulette Goddard), and Blackbeard the Pirate (1952; directed by Raoul Walsh, and starring Robert Newton and Linda Darnell). He wrote the original source novel for Along Came Jones (1945; starring Gary Cooper and Loretta Young), as well as a score of other screenplays and an assortment of other novels and short stories. Le May wrote and directed High Lonesome (1950) starring John Drew Barrymore and Chill Wills and featuring Jack Elam. Le May also wrote and produced (but did not direct) Quebec (1951), also starring John Drew Barrymore.

== Biography ==
He was born in Indianapolis, Indiana, to John and Maude Brown Le May. His father was a public school teacher and his maternal grandfather (Daniel L. Brown Sr.) and uncle (Daniel L. Brown Jr.) were both lawyers. He first lived with his parents and uncle at his grandparents home at 3229 North Illinois Street in Indianapolis. He moved with his family, including his sister Elizabeth, to Aurora, Illinois, as a teenager in the 1910s.

He attended Stetson University in DeLand, Florida, in 1916. In 1918 he registered for the World War I draft in Aurora, and then enlisted and was commissioned a Second Lieutenant in the U.S. Army. While attending the University of Chicago, where he graduated in 1922 with a Bachelor of Philosophy degree, he joined the Illinois National Guard. He was promoted to First Lieutenant Field Artillery for the Illinois National Guard in 1923.

He published his first novel, Painted Ponies, in 1927 (about the Cheyenne and the U. S. Cavalry horse soldiers).

== Works ==
=== Novels ===
- Painted Ponies (1927)
- Old Father of Waters (1928)
- Pelican Coast (1929)
- One Of Us Is A Murderer (1930)
- Gunsight Trail (1931)
- Bug Eye (1931)
- Winter Range (1932)
- Cattle Kingdom (1933)
- Thunder in the Dust (1934) – Adapted in The Sundowners, AKA Thunder in the Dust (1950), directed by George Templeton
- The Smoky Years (1935)
- Wild Justice (1935)
- Empire for a Lady (1937)
- The Story of Dr. Wassell (1943)
- Useless Cowboy (1944) – Adapted in Along Came Jones (1945), directed by Stuart Heisler
- The Searchers (1954) – Adapted in The Searchers (1956), directed by John Ford
- The Unforgiven, AKA Kiowa Moon (1957) – Adapted in The Unforgiven (1960), directed by John Huston
- By Dim and Flaring Lamps (1962)

=== Short story collections ===
- Spanish Crossing (1998). Contains 14 short stories:
  - "The Wolf Hunter" (1929)
  - "Just a Horse of Mine" (1930)
  - "Hell on wheels" (1934)
  - "Kindly Kick Out Bearer" (1930)
  - "The Biscuit Shooter" (1931)
  - "Guns Flame in Peaceful Valley"
  - "And Him Long Gone" (1932)
  - "Saddle Bum" (1931)
  - "Delayed Action" (1931)
  - "Bronc Fighter's Girl" (1932)
  - "The Young Rush In" (1929)
  - "A Shot in the Dark"
  - "Lost Dutchman O'Riley's Luck"
  - "Spanish Crossing" (1933)
- The Bells of San Juan (2001). Contains 12 short stories:
  - "The Little Kid" (1938)
  - "Lawman's debt" (1934)
  - "Gray rider"
  - "Trail Driver's Luck" (1930)
  - "The Loan of a Gun" (1929)
  - "Eyes of doom" (1932)
  - "Tombstone's daughter"
  - "Star on his heart" (1944)
  - "The Battle of Gunsmoke Lode" (1930)
  - "The Braver Thing" (1931)
  - "Sundown corral" (1938)
  - "The Bells of San Juan" (1927)
- West of Nowhere (2002). Contains 13 short stories:
  - "Death rides the Trionte" (1937)
  - "Mules" (1931)
  - "The Killer in the Chute" (1932)
  - "Sentenced to Swing" (1929)
  - "The Fourth Man" (1926)
  - "The Fiddle in the Storm" (1933)
  - "Terlegraphy and the Bronc'" (1925)
  - "Gun Fight at Burnt Corral" (1934)
  - "A Horse for Sale" (1931)
  - "Pardon Me, Lady" (1932)
  - "Six-Gun graduate" (1931)
  - "Range Bred" (1933)
  - "West of Nowhere" (1939)
- Painted Rock (2004). Contains 11 short stories:
  - "Whack-Ear's Pup"
  - "Strange Fellow"
  - "Gunnies from Gehenna"
  - "Hard-boiled"
  - "Next door to hell"
  - "Feud Fight" (1940)
  - "Thanks to a Girl in Love" (1932)
  - "Man with a Future" (1937)
  - "Old Thunder Pumper" (1930)
  - "The Nester's Girl" (1933)
  - "Fight at Painted Rock" (1939)
- Tonopah Range: Western Stories (2006). Contains 6 short stories:
  - "Tonopah Range"
  - "One charge of powder" (1930)
  - "Blood moon"
  - "Empty guns"
  - "A Girl is Like a Colt" (1932)
  - "Dead Man's Ambush" (1944)

=== Short stories ===
Uncollected short stories.

- "Circles in the Sky" (1919)
- "Out of the Swamp" (1920)
- "Ghost Lanterns" (1922)
- "Hullabaloo" (1922)
- "The Brass Dolphin" (1922)
- "Needin' Help Bad" (1924)
- "His Better Idea" (1925)
- "Mustang Breed" (1925)
- "The Contest Man" (1925)
- "The Legacy Mule" (1925)
- "Baldy at the Brink" (1926)
- "Long Bob from 'Rapahoe" (1926)
- "Facts an' Figgers on Cayuses" (1927)
- "Old Father of Waters" (1927)
- "Painted Ponies" (1927)
- "The Dedwood Coach Brakes Down" (1927)
- Bug Eye series:
  1. "Bug Eye Neerly Starves" (1927)
  2. "Bug Eye Loses Hisself" (1927)
  3. "Bug Eye Gets Hisself in Jale" (1928)
  4. "Bug Eye Among the Soo" (1928)
  5. "Hank Joins the Vijiluntys" (1928)
  6. "Hank's Other Pardner" (1928)
  7. "Hank Arrives Back Ware He Cum Frum" (1929)
- "Are You There, Bug Eye?" (1928)
- "Bug Eye's Wandering Partner" (1928)
- "The Cross Eyed Bull" (1928)
- "Help, Bug Eye—I Own the Town" (1929)
- "Cowboys Will Be Cowboys" (1930)
- "Gambler's Suicide" (1930)
- "Horse Laugh" (1930)
- "One of Us Is a Murderer" (1930)
- "The Creeping Cloud" (1930)
- "The Jungle Terror" (1930)
- "The Short Short Story" (1930)
- "To Save a Girl" (1930)
- "Under Fire" (1930)
- "A Neat, Quick Case" (1931)
- "Gunsight Trail" (1931)
- "The Jungle of the Gods" (1931)
- "A romance of the rodeos" (1932)
- "A Short Short Story" (1932, with Lyman Bryson)
- "Bronc-Fighter's Secret" (1932)
- "Eyes of Doom" (1932, with Lyman Bryson)
- "Have One on Me" (1932)
- "A Passage to Rangoon" (1933)
- "Cold Trails" (1933)
- "Fated Trails" (1933)
- "They Sometimes Come Back" (1933)
- "After the Hounds" (1934)
- "Out of the Whirlpool" (1934)
- "Death on the Rimrock" (1935)
- "Deepwater Island" (1935)
- "Fight Back or Die" (1935)
- "Horses" (1935)
- "Needin' Some Help" (1935)
- "Pardners" (1935)
- "The Blessed Mule" (1935)
- "A Cowboy in San Juan" (1936)
- "Dark Tropic Sea" (1936)
- "Death Rides the Border" (1936)
- "From an Old Timer in the Black Hills" (1936)
- "Iron Paws" (1936)
- "Outlaw Cavalcade" (1936)
- "The Man from Arapahoe" (1936)
- "Ghost at His Shoulder" (1937)
- "Night by a Wagon Trail" (1937)
- "A Short Short Story" (1938)
- "Impersonation" (1938)
- "Pinto York" (1938)
- "Uncertain Wings" (1938)
- "Aces Is His Hair" (1939)
- "Interrupted Take-Off" (1939)
- "Hell For Breakfast" (1947)
- "Wild Justice" (1948)
- "The Avenging Texans" (1954)
- "Missing in Action" (1956)

=== Screenplays ===
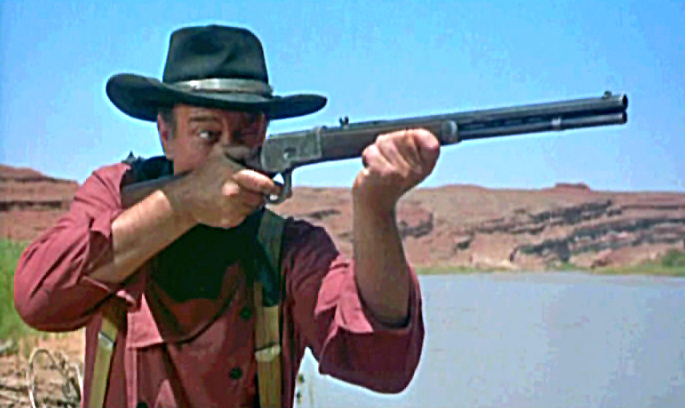
John Wayne in The Searchers (1956)

- North West Mounted Police (1940), directed by Cecil B. DeMille
- Reap the Wild Wind (1942), directed by Cecil B. DeMille
- The Story of Dr. Wassell (1944), directed by Cecil B. DeMille
- The Adventures of Mark Twain (1944), directed by Irving Rapper
- Trailin' West (1944), directed by George Templeton
- Story of G.I. Joe (1945), directed by William Wellman. Uncredited
- San Antonio (1945), directed by David Butler and, uncredited, Robert Florey and Raoul Walsh
- Cheyenne (1947), directed by Raoul Walsh
- Gunfighters (1947), directed by George Waggner
- Tap Roots (1948), directed by George Marshall
- The Walking Hills (1949), directed by John Sturges
- The Sundowners, a.k.a. Thunder in the Dust (1950), directed by George Templeton
- High Lonesome (1950), directed by Alan Le May
- Rocky Mountain (1950), directed by William Keighley
- Quebec (1951), directed by George Templeton
- I Dream of Jeanie, a.k.a. I Dream of Jeanie (with the Light Brown Hair) (1952), directed by Allan Dwan
- Blackbeard the Pirate (1952), directed by Raoul Walsh
- Flight Nurse, a.k.a. Angels Take Over, a.k.a. Angels over Korea (1953), directed by Allan Dwan
- The Vanishing American (1955), directed by Joseph Kane
