= Cara Williams =

American actress (1925–2021)

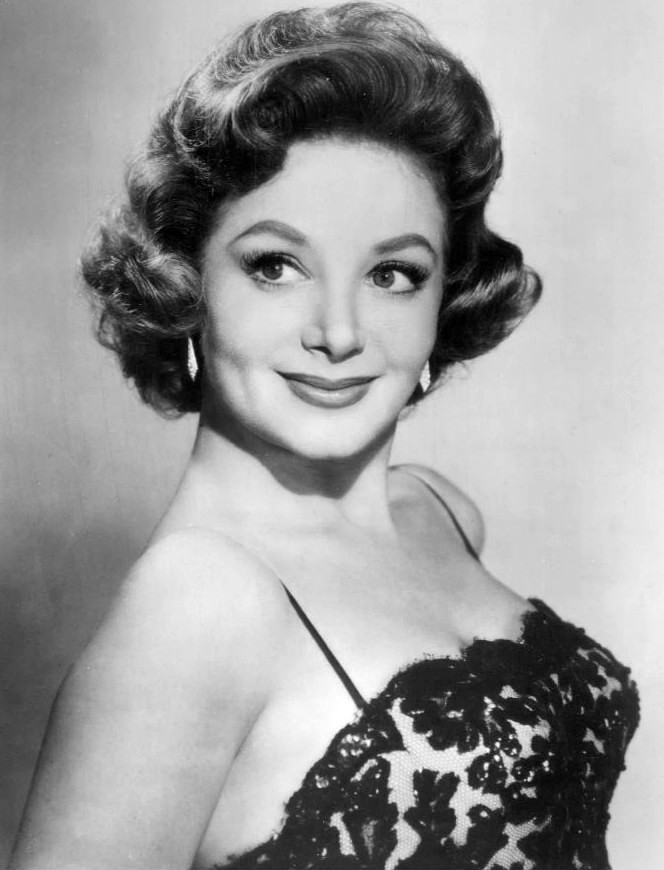
- Williams in 1960
- Born: Bernice Kamiat; June 29, 1925; Brooklyn, New York City, U.S.
- Died: December 9, 2021 (aged 96); Beverly Hills, California, U.S.
- Other name: Bernice Kay
- Occupation: Actress
- Years active: 1941–1982
- Spouses: Alan Gray (m. 1945; div. 1947) John Drew Barrymore (m. 1952; div. 1959) Asher Dann (m. 1964; died 2018)
- Children: 2, including John

Cara Williams (born Bernice Kamiat; June 29, 1925 – December 9, 2021) was an American film and television actress. She was best known for her role as Billy's mother in The Defiant Ones (1958), for which she was nominated for the Academy Award for Best Supporting Actress, and her role as Gladys Porter on the 1960–62 CBS television series Pete and Gladys, for which she was nominated for the Emmy Award for Best Lead Actress in a Comedy. At the time of her death, Williams was one of the last surviving actors from the Golden Age of Hollywood.

== Personal life ==
Cara Williams was born Bernice Kamiat on June 29, 1925, in Brooklyn, New York City, to a Romanian Jewish mother Florence "Flora" Kamiat (née Schwartz; 1897–1990) and an Austrian Jewish father Benjamin Irving "Benny" Kamiat (1865–1957). She began making impersonations of all the screen stars she watched in the movies there, and knew she wanted to be an actress. Her parents divorced, and her mother relocated her to Los Angeles, where she chose Cara Williams as her stage name and attended the Hollywood Professional School. Soon, she began performing on radio, and at the age of 16 in 1941, she was signed to a film contract and began performing in bit roles, credited as Bernice Kay.

Williams married Alan Gray in 1945; they had a daughter, Cathy Gray, but the marriage ended after two years. Williams then married John Drew Barrymore in 1952. The marriage was troubled and they divorced in 1959. Their son, John Blyth Barrymore, followed in his parents' footsteps and also became an actor. Her third husband was New York-born Los Angeles real-estate entrepreneur Asher Dann (né Jagoda; the couple remained together until his death in 2018, aged 83.

== Film and television ==
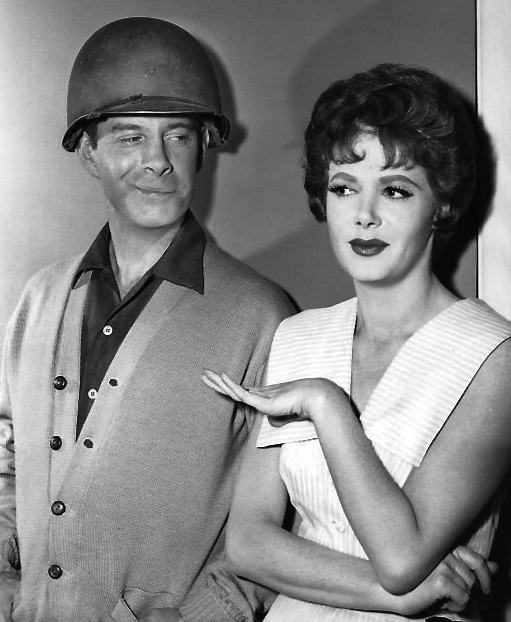
Harry Morgan and Williams on set of Pete and Gladys (1960)

Williams's first credited role was in the Western Wide Open Town, released in 1941. She followed this with the dramas Girls Town (1942) and Happy Land (1943) with Don Ameche. She appeared uncredited in the Oscar-nominated musical film Sweet and Low-Down and as a secretary in the Oscar-winning film Laura (both 1944) directed by Otto Preminger. She also had a supporting role in the drama In the Meantime, Darling, which stars Jeanne Crain. Around this time, she took some time off, marrying her first husband, Alan Gray, in 1945, and having her daughter Cathy.

She had supporting roles in the Oscar-nominated films Boomerang (1947) directed by Elia Kazan, and (uncredited) in Sitting Pretty (1948). She next had supporting roles in The Saxon Charm (1948), which stars Susan Hayward, and Knock on Any Door (1949), which stars Humphrey Bogart.

Williams started the early 1950s by appearing often on television. She played supporting roles in the musicals The Girl Next Door (1953) and The Great Diamond Robbery (1954). She also appeared in Monte Carlo Baby (1951), a comedy with Audrey Hepburn. Williams took time off during this period in which she was married to John Drew Barrymore and gave birth to their son, John Blyth Barrymore, in 1954.

Williams performed in the film Meet Me in Las Vegas (1956), in which she sang the song "I Refuse to Rock n Roll," and had a supporting role in The Helen Morgan Story (1957), which starred Ann Blyth and Paul Newman. She was cast as Billy's mother in The Defiant Ones (1958), which was nominated for the Academy Award for Best Picture and for which she was nominated for the Golden Globe and Academy Award for Best Supporting Actress. In Never Steal Anything Small (1959), a musical comedy, she appeared with James Cagney. Williams also co-starred with Danny Kaye in the comedy film The Man from the Diner's Club (1963).

Williams appeared in four episodes of Alfred Hitchcock Presents: "Decoy" (1956), "De Mortuis" (1956), "Last Request" (1957), and "The Cure" (1960). From 1960 to 1962, she starred in the CBS television comedy series Pete and Gladys, with Harry Morgan as Pete. The series was a spin-off of the CBS comedy December Bride, in which Morgan appeared from 1954 to 1959 as Pete Porter. Gladys, his wife, was referred to throughout the entire run of that series, but never shown. Williams brought the character to life, with Morgan retaining his role as her husband. Williams was nominated for the Emmy Award for Best Lead Actress in a Comedy. For the next two years, while still under contract to the network, CBS kept her in the public eye by repeating Pete and Gladys episodes as part of its morning line-up, an unusual move for a short-run series. CBS returned Williams to prime time in 1964 in her own series, The Cara Williams Show, in which Frank Aletter and she portrayed a married couple who had to keep their marriage secret from their employer. It lasted only one season.

During the 1970s, Williams's acting appearances became less frequent. In 1971, she had a supporting role in the film Doctors' Wives. She guest-starred in three episodes of Rhoda in 1975, in the role of Mae. Her last television performance was in a 1977 episode of Visions. Her last film role came in 1978 with The One Man Jury.

== Retirement and death ==
After retiring from acting, Williams began a career as an interior designer. She resided in Los Angeles and was married to a real-estate entrepreneur (and former actor) Asher Dann (né Jagoda), her third husband, until his death in 2018. Williams died on December 9, 2021, at the age of 96 of a heart attack.

== Filmography ==
=== Film ===
Year	Title	Role	Notes
1941	Wide Open Town	Joan Stuart	
1942	Girls' Town	Ethel	
1943	Happy Land	Gretchen Barry	
1944	In the Meantime, Darling	Ruby Mae Sayre	
1945	The Spider	Wanda Vann	
1947	Boomerang!	Irene Nelson	
1948	The Saxon Charm	Dolly Humber	
1949	Knock on Any Door	Nelly Watkins	
1953	The Girl Next Door	Rosie Green	
1953	We Go to Monte Carlo	Marinette	
1954	The Great Diamond Robbery	Maggie Drumman	
1956	Meet Me in Las Vegas	Kelly Donavan	
1957	The Helen Morgan Story	Dolly Evans	
1958	The Defiant Ones	Billy's Mother	
1959	Never Steal Anything Small	Winnipeg Simmons	
1963	The Man from the Diners' Club	Sugar Pye	
1971	Doctors' Wives	Maggie Gray	
1977	The White Buffalo	Cassie Ollinger	
1978	The One Man Jury	Nancy	

=== Television ===
Year	Title	Role	Notes
1949	Theatre of Romance		Episode: "The Afternoon of a Faun"
1950	The Clock		Episode: "The Hypnotist"
1950	The Philco Television Playhouse		Episode: "The End Is Known"
1950	The Chevrolet Tele-Theatre		Episode: "The Sun"
1950	The Web		Episode: "The Twelfth Juror"
1950	Starlight Theatre		Episode: "The Great Nonentity"
1950	The Billy Rose Show		Episode: "Drink to Me Only with Thine Ice"
1950	Suspense	Betty Marshall / Babe / Myra Wilson / Nellie	Episodes: "1000 to One", "I'm No Hero", "A Pocketful of Murder", "The Mallet"
1951	Robert Montgomery Presents		Episode: "Quicksand"
1951	Armstrong Circle Theatre		Episode: "The Lost and Found"
1952	Broadway Television Theatre	Aggie Lynch	Episode: "Within the Law"
1952	Steve Randall		Episode: "The Perfect Alibi"
1955	NBC Matinee Theater		Episode: "Beyond a Reasonable Doubt"
1956	Lux Video Theatre	Paula	Episode: "The Glass Web"
1956–1960	Alfred Hitchcock Presents	various characters	Season 1 Episode 37: "Decoy" as Mona Cameron (1956) Season 2 Episode 3: "De Mortuis" as Irene Rankin (1956) Season 3 Episode 8: "Last Request" as Mona Carstairs (1957) Season 5 Episode 17: "The Cure" as Marie Jensen (1960)
1957	Fireside Theatre	Dorothy	Episode: "Harbor Patrol"
1957	Date with the Angels	Diane	Episode: "Diane"
1959	Naked City	Lois Heller	Episode: "A Wood of Thorne"
1960	Westinghouse Desilu Playhouse	Midge Rospond	Episode: "Meeting at Appalachia"
1960	Dick Powell's Zane Grey Theater	Irene West	Episode: "Seed of Evil"
1960–1962	Pete and Gladys	Gladys Porter	Main role
1961	The Red Skelton Show	Clara Appleby / Raggedy Ann	Episodes: "Appleby's Remote", "Freddie and the Yuletide Doll"
1964	Valentine's Day	Susie Peters	Episode: "Teahouse of the Bankrupt Moon"
1964–1965	The Cara Williams Show	Cara Bridges / Cara Wilton	Lead role (30 episodes)
1974–1975	Rhoda	Mae	Episodes: "I'm a Little Late, Folks", "Guess What I Got You for the Holidays", "Whattaya Think It's There For?"
1976	The Ashes of Mrs. Reasoner	Sylvia Reasoner	TV film
1976	Medical Center	Sheila Ruskin	Episode: "The Happy State of Depression"
1977	Visions	Anna III	Episode: "The Prison Game"
1982	In Security	Doris Gleen	TV film
