= Blackbeard the Pirate =

1952 film by Raoul Walsh

- DVD cover for French film version
- Directed by: Raoul Walsh
- Screenplay by: Alan Le May
- Story by: DeVallon Scott
- Produced by: Edmund Grainger
- Starring: Robert Newton; Linda Darnell; William Bendix; Keith Andes; Torin Thatcher
- Cinematography: William E. Snyder
- Edited by: Ralph Dawson
- Music by: Victor Young
- Production company: RKO Radio Pictures
- Distributed by: RKO Radio Pictures
- Release date: December 24, 1952 (Los Angeles)
- Running time: 99 minutes
- Country: United States
- Language: English
- Box office: $1.25 million (U.S. rental)

Blackbeard the Pirate is a 1952 American adventure pirate film directed by Raoul Walsh and starring Robert Newton, Linda Darnell, William Bendix, Keith Andes and Torin Thatcher. The film was produced Edmund Grainger for RKO Radio Pictures and the screenplay was written by Alan Le May based on a story by DeVallon Scott.

== Plot ==
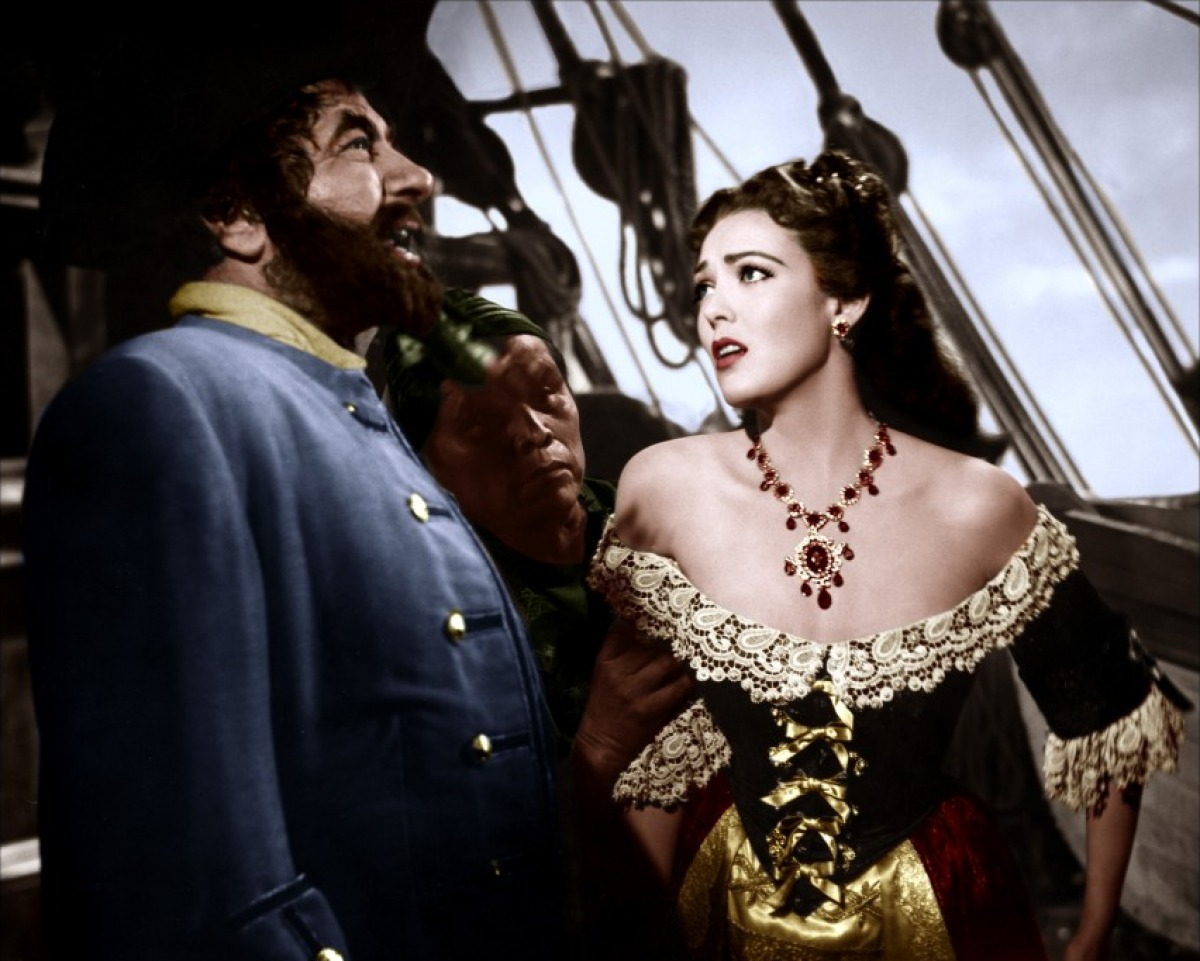
Robert Newton and Linda Darnell in Blackbeard the Pirate

The film follows Royal Navy lieutenant Robert Maynard, who seeks a reward by proving that privateer Henry Morgan engages in piracy. Maynard poses as a surgeon aboard the ship of pirate Charles Bellamy, whom he believes to be in league with Morgan. Once Maynard and fellow spy Briggs come aboard, they discover that the pirate Edward Teach, known as Blackbeard, has murdered Bellamy and taken command as captain. Also aboard is Edwina Mansfield, a pirate's daughter, who was to marry Bellamy. Blackbeard knows that Morgan loves Mansfield and will pursue her.

Blackbeard orders Maynard to remove a bullet from his neck and demands that sailor Gilly watch him. Gilly slips Maynard a note begging him to slit Blackbeard's throat, but Maynard refuses. Maynard slips into Blackbeard's quarters and finds Bellamy's logbook, which he hopes will contain evidence that Bellamy had provided Morgan with stolen goods.

Maynard defends Edwina against the unwanted advances of a lecherous pirate, killing him with his dagger. She tells Maynard that she agreed to marry Bellamy to escape from Morgan, from whom she has stolen treasure that is now hidden in a clothes chest. Blackbeard opens one of Edwina's chests but discovers only letters in which Edwina implicates Morgan as Bellamy's ally. Maynard tries to steal the letter, but Blackbeard stops him, noting that if Morgan were to be arrested, all of his loot would be transferred to the king.

Blackbeard finally identifies the treasure chest and claims it. Maynard sabotages the ship's water supply, flooding the hold and forcing Blackbeard to beach the ship for repairs. Blackbeard seizes the opportunity to bury the treasure, but while his crew pursues a drifting rowboat, he murders the only witness and hides the treasure under a large rock instead of burying it. On the island, they find a derelict who closely resembles Blackbeard, who orders the man to be protected, sensing that he may prove useful.

Morgan and his men sneak ashore at night and kill 20 members of Blackbeard's crew, but Blackbeard switches clothes with the derelict and leaves him to be killed by Morgan. Edwina and Maynard arrive in port and discover that the man who gave Maynard his assignment is in jail and that Morgan is now the governor. Morgan puts a price on Maynard's head to prevent him from revealing Morgan's duplicity.

Edwina and Maynard know that they must steal Blackbeard's captured ship and sail away in it, but the real Blackbeard has arrived and raided the local jail for fresh crew members. When Edwina and Maynard board the boat, they find themselves prisoners once again.

Morgan transforms a captured Spanish galleon into a seaworthy vessel to lure Blackbeard into attacking it. After a fierce sea battle, Blackbeard uses Edwina as a human shield and Morgan stops the fight, but there have been heavy casualties. First mate Worley demands that they return to unearth the treasure, and Blackbeard agrees. When they find the treasure, they return to the ship with it and Blackbeard has Worley killed. The rest of the crew are locked in the hold, but the undersized Gilly knows secret passages that Blackbeard does not. Blackbeard is captured and buried up to his neck on the beach to be drowned by the rising tide. Maynard and Edwina steal a dinghy and escape while the crew is occupied with their vengeance, stating that anywhere is better than where they were.

== Cast ==
- Robert Newton as Captain Edward Teach, known as Blackbeard
- Linda Darnell as Edwina Mansfield
- William Bendix as Ben Worley
- Keith Andes as Robert Maynard
- Torin Thatcher as Sir Henry Morgan
- Irene Ryan as Alvina, a lady in waiting
- Alan Mowbray as Noll
- Richard Egan as Briggs
- Skelton Knaggs as Gilly
- Dick Wessel as Dutchman
- Anthony Caruso as Pierre La Garde
- Jack Lambert as Tom Whetstone
- Noel Drayton as Jeremy
- Pat Flaherty as Job Maggot

== Production ==
The film is based on an original story written by DeVallon Scott. RKO Radio Pictures originally conceived the project, titled Buccaneer Empire, as a vehicle for Faith Domergue with Robert Stevenson as the director. In February 1951, RKO announced Robert Newton, who had recently played Long John Silver in Treasure Island (1950), for the lead role. However, production was delayed, and Charles Laughton was rumored to replace Newton. Alan Le May was hired to rewrite the script shortly before filming began on May 15, 1952.

== Reception ==
In a contemporary review for The New York Times, critic Howard Thompson wrote: "This R. K. O. swashbuckler offers a lusty rogues gallery in opulent Technicolor, with little occasion for rejoicing, however. For while this piracy package streamlines history with salty good-naturedness, the material ... holds few pattern deviations. ... Director Raoul Walsh does succeed in projecting some brisk, pictorial animation. ... But Mr. Newton, who is the whole picture, must be seen to be believed. Sporting a beehive chin growth that transmits a volume gamut of roars and even belches, the actor wallows through an outrageously flamboyant caricature of his Long John Silver part in Disney's 'Treasure Island.'"
