= Pete and Gladys =

American television sitcom (1960–1962)

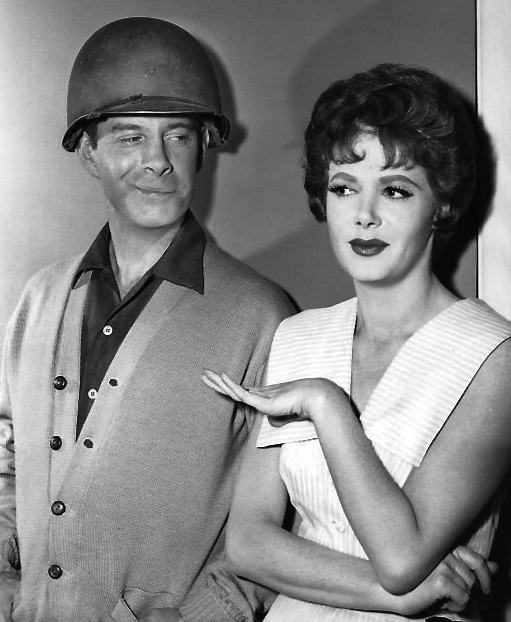
- Harry Morgan and Cara Williams from Pete and Gladys (1960)
- Genre: Sitcom
- Created by: Parke Levy
- Written by: Alan Lipscott; Bob Fisher; Larry Rhine; Bob Schiller; Bob Weiskopf; Devery Freeman
- Directed by: Leslie Goodwins; James V. Kern; Sidney Lanfield
- Starring: Harry Morgan; Cara Williams
- Theme music composer: Parke Levy; Lee Wainer
- Ending theme: Wilbur Hatch
- Composers: Jerry Goldsmith; Wilbur Hatch; Lucien Moraweck; Carl Brandt
- Country of origin: United States
- Original language: English
- No. of seasons: 2
- No. of episodes: 72

Production
- Executive producer: Parke Levy (1961–1962)
- Producers: Parke Levy (1960–1961); Devery Freeman (1961–1962)
- Camera setup: Single-camera
- Running time: 30 minutes
- Production companies: El Camino Productions; CBS Television Network

Original release
- Network: CBS
- Release: September 18, 1960 – September 10, 1962

Related
- December Bride

Pete and Gladys is an American television sitcom starring Harry Morgan and Cara Williams that aired on CBS every Monday at 8:00 pm Eastern and Pacific time for two seasons, beginning on September 19, 1960. The last episode was broadcast on September 10, 1962.

== Synopsis ==
One of CBS television's most popular and highly rated sitcoms of the 1950s, December Bride, starred Spring Byington and co-starred Harry Morgan as next-door neighbor Pete Porter. Pete spent most of his time complaining about his scatterbrained wife Gladys, who was unseen to viewers. In this spin-off series, Gladys emerges as the gorgeous redhaired comedienne Cara Williams. Pete is an insurance salesman, and the happy couple resides in Westwood, California.

Besides leading-man Peter, another carryover from December Bride during the first season was the character of Hilda Crocker (Verna Felton), a close equivalent of I Love Lucy's Ethel Mertz; she appeared in 23 episodes. Frances Rafferty, another December Bride veteran, appeared in seven episodes of Pete and Gladys as Nancy (a different character from her role in the original series). Barbara Stuart had a recurring first-season role as Gladys' friend Alice, and Ernest Truex appeared in six episodes as Gladys' widowed father, "Pop".

== Guest stars ==
- Jack Albertson
- Norman Alden
- Morey Amsterdam
- Eleanor Audley
- Raymond Bailey
- Majel Barrett
- Bea Benaderet
- Whitney Blake
- Willis Bouchey
- Frank Cady
- Harry Cheshire
- Richard Deacon
- Fifi D'Orsay
- Donna Douglas
- Gale Gordon
- Sandra Gould
- Sterling Holloway
- Ron Howard
- Rodolfo Hoyos Jr.
- Marty Ingels
- Ted Knight
- Nancy Kulp
- Charles Lane
- Nan Leslie
- Howard McNear
- Carole Mathews
- Strother Martin
- Doris Packer
- Sue Randall
- Cesar Romero
- Sig Ruman
- Reta Shaw
- Doris Singleton
- Olan Soule
- Will Wright

== Reception ==
Pete and Gladys never made it into the Nielsen ratings top 30 during the course of its primetime run. After it ceased production, it was repeated as part of the CBS weekday-morning line up. It aired at 11:30 am EST for two years from October 1, 1962, to October 2, 1964.

Williams was nominated for a 1962 Emmy Award for Outstanding Continued Performance by a Lead Actress in a Comedy Series. She lost to veteran Shirley Booth of NBC's Hazel.

== Episode list ==
=== Season 1 (1960–61) ===
No. overall	No. in season	Title	Directed by	Written by	Original release date
1	1	"For Pete's Sake"	Unknown	Unknown	September 19, 1960
2	2	"Crime of Passion"	Unknown	Unknown	September 26, 1960
3	3	"The Bavarian Wedding Chest"	Unknown	Unknown	October 3, 1960
4	4	"The Handyman"	Unknown	Unknown	October 10, 1960
5	5	"Movie Bug"	Unknown	Unknown	October 17, 1960
6	6	"Oo-La-La"	Unknown	Unknown	October 24, 1960
7	7	"The Goat Story"	Unknown	Unknown	October 31, 1960
8	8	"Pete's Personality Change"	Jack Arnold	Norman Paul	November 7, 1960
9	9	"Camping Out"	Unknown	Unknown	November 14, 1960
10	10	"Bowling Brawl"	Unknown	Unknown	November 21, 1960
11	11	"Pete Takes Up Golf"	Unknown	Unknown	November 28, 1960
12	12	"Gladys and the Piggy Bank"	Unknown	Unknown	December 5, 1960
13	13	"No Man for Japan"	Unknown	Unknown	December 12, 1960
14	14	"Misplaced Weekend"	Unknown	Unknown	December 19, 1960
15	15	"Gladys Rents the House"	Unknown	Unknown	January 2, 1961
16	16	"Gladys' Political Campaign"	Unknown	Unknown	January 9, 1961
17	17	"Cousin Violet"	Unknown	Unknown	January 16, 1961
18	18	"The House Next Door"	Unknown	Unknown	January 23, 1961
19	19	"The Insurance Faker"	Unknown	Unknown	January 30, 1961
20	20	"Skin Deep"	Unknown	Unknown	February 6, 1961
21	21	"The Six Musketeers"	Unknown	Unknown	February 20, 1961
22	22	"Panhandler"	Unknown	Unknown	February 27, 1961
23	23	"Gladys Opens Pete's Mail"	Unknown	Unknown	March 6, 1961
24	24	"The Garage Story"	Unknown	Unknown	March 13, 1961
25	25	"The Orchid Story"	Unknown	Unknown	March 20, 1961
26	26	"Secretary for a Day"	Unknown	Unknown	March 27, 1961
27	27	"The Fur Coat Story"	Unknown	Unknown	April 3, 1961
28	28	"Peaceful in the Country"	Unknown	Unknown	April 10, 1961
29	29	"Junior"	Unknown	Unknown	April 17, 1961
30	30	"Gladys Cooks Pete's Goose"	Unknown	Unknown	April 24, 1961
31	31	"A Study in Gray"	Unknown	Unknown	May 1, 1961
32	32	"Pop's Girl Friend"	Unknown	Unknown	May 8, 1961
33	33	"Ring-a-Ding-Ding"	Unknown	Unknown	May 15, 1961
34	34	"The Mannequin Story"	James V. Kern	Bill Freedman & Henry Sharp	May 22, 1961
35	35	"The Projectionist"	Unknown	Unknown	May 29, 1961
36	36	"Gladys Goes to College"	Unknown	Unknown	June 19, 1961

=== Season 2 (1961–62) ===
No. overall	No. in season	Title	Directed by	Written by	Original release date
37	1	"Crossed Wires"	Unknown	Unknown	September 18, 1961
38	2	"Fasten Your Seat Belts"	Unknown	Unknown	September 25, 1961
39	3	"The Hoarder and the Boarder"	Unknown	Unknown	October 2, 1961
40	4	"Second Car"	Unknown	Unknown	October 9, 1961
41	5	"Uncle Paul's New Wife"	Unknown	Unknown	October 16, 1961
42	6	"Money, Money, Who's Got the Money?"	Unknown	Unknown	October 23, 1961
43	7	"Uncle Paul's Insurance"	James V. Kern	Bob Schiller & Bob Weiskopf	October 30, 1961
44	8	"Down with Togetherness"	Unknown	Unknown	November 6, 1961
45	9	"Eyewitness"	Unknown	Unknown	November 13, 1961
46	10	"Three Loves of Gladys"	Unknown	Unknown	November 20, 1961
47	11	"Sick, Sick, Sick"	Unknown	Unknown	November 27, 1961
48	12	"Christmas Shopping"	Unknown	Unknown	December 4, 1961
49	13	"The Live-in Couple"	Unknown	Unknown	December 11, 1961
50	14	"Lover, Go Away"	Unknown	Unknown	December 25, 1961
51	15	"Hero in the House"	James V. Kern	Bob Schiller & Bob Weiskopf	January 1, 1962
52	16	"Pete's Hobby"	Unknown	Unknown	January 8, 1962
53	17	"Who Was That Man?"	Unknown	Unknown	January 15, 1962
54	18	"Garden Wedding"	Leslie Goodwins	Bob Schiller & Bob Weiskopf	January 22, 1962
55	19	"Follow That Skeleton"	Sidney Lanfield	Alan Lipscott & Bob Fisher	January 29, 1962
56	20	"Will the Real Michele Tabour Please Stand Up?"	Leslie Goodwins	Henry Sharp & Barry E. Blitzner	February 5, 1962
57	21	"The Prize"	Leslie Goodwins	Devery Freeman	February 12, 1962
58	22	"Yak, Yak, Yak"	Unknown	Unknown	February 19, 1962
59	23	"Never Forget a Friend"	Leslie Goodwins	Danny Simon	February 26, 1962
60	24	"Office Wife"	Unknown	Unknown	March 5, 1962
61	25	"The Chocolate Cake Caper"	Unknown	Unknown	March 12, 1962
62	26	"Sleepytime Wife"	Sidney Miller	Bob Fisher & Arthur Marx	March 19, 1962
63	27	"Maternity House"	Unknown	Unknown	April 2, 1962
64	28	"Pete's Party Dress"	Unknown	Unknown	April 9, 1962
65	29	"The Top Banana"	Unknown	Unknown	April 16, 1962
66	30	"Go Help Friends"	Unknown	Unknown	April 23, 1962
67	31	"The Lame Excuse"	Unknown	Unknown	May 7, 1962
68	32	"Step on Me"	Unknown	Unknown	May 14, 1962
69	33	"The Case of the Gossipy Maid"	Unknown	Unknown	May 21, 1962
70	34	"The Arrival"	Unknown	Unknown	May 28, 1962
71	35	"The Expectant Gardner"	Unknown	Unknown	June 4, 1962
72	36	"Continental Dinner"	Unknown	Unknown	September 10, 1962
