= Hybrid (1997 film) =

- VHS cover art
- Directed by: Fred Olen Ray
- Written by: Sean O'Bannon
- Produced by: Fred Olen Ray co-producer Roger Mende executive producer Jon McCollister; Jim Wynorski
- Production company: American Independent Productions
- Release date: 1997
- Running time: 86 mins
- Country: USA
- Language: English

Hybrid is a 1997 American science fiction horror film, directed by Fred Olen Ray. It is a remake of the 1987 film Creepozoids.

== Plot ==
A team of commandos take shelter in an abandoned research facility during an ion storm. They are attacked by a creature which is a hybrid of human and alien.

== Cast ==
- John Blyth Barrymore as Dr. Paul Hamilton
- Brinke Stevens as Dr. Leslie Morgan
- J.J. North as Carla Ferguson
- Tim Abell as McQueen
- Ted Monte as Milo Tyrel
- Peter Spellos as Sergeant Frank Blaine
- Bob Bragg as Pike
- Nikki Fritz as Susan
- Robert Quarry as Dr. Farrell

== Production ==
The film starred John Blyth Barrymore who had appeared on several films for Fred Olen Ray. He says the film was shot in six days of which Barrymore filmed three.

The film includes footage from Ray's Biohazard: The Alien Force.
