= Heinz Kiessling =

German musician (1926–2003)

Background information
- Born: Heinz Kiessling; March 11, 1926; Nuremberg, Germany
- Died: December 27, 2003 (aged 77) Starnberg, Germany
- Genres: Production music, light music
- Occupations: Music arranger, composer

Heinz Kiessling (March 11, 1926 – December 27, 2003) was a German musician, conductor, composer, and music producer, known mainly from his work for popular films and television programs.

== Life and career ==
Kiessling studied piano, composition, and conducting after World War II at the Nuremberg Conservatory in 1949, and started his career in 1949 as a pianist and played in different concerts around the world. Soon after, he started working on recording music for television. In 1950, he began composing music in the jazz, dance, and light music genres. At times, he also led his own orchestra, and also worked many years for the RIAS Big Band in Berlin. Together with the pianist Werner Tautz, he established in 1964 the label "Brilliant" through which he managed numerous national and international big bands.

Kiessling worked with many national and international stars, including Chet Baker, Luis Bonfa, Wenche Myhre, and Caterina Valente. For over two decades, he accompanied the shows of Peter Alexander. In addition, Kiessling composed the songs and scene music for numerous films and television productions, including Klimbim, Zwei himmlische Töchter, Dingsda, Das Traumschiff and Aktenzeichen XY... ungelöst. In total he produced over 1200 tunes and also published some of his own recordings which made him become one of the most successful German "easy listening" composers of the post-war period.

== Notable works ==
In 1969, Kiessling wrote "In the Shadow of the Moon" for Reprise, which later on became the theme song for Frank Sinatra's daughter Tina Sinatra TV mini-series Romeo und Julia '70.

His piece "Temptation Sensation" (originally titled "Haute Couture") is used as the theme song for the FX and FXX TV show It's Always Sunny in Philadelphia. Always Sunny cast member Charlie Day told Entertainment Weekly that the original pilot of the show took place in Los Angeles and the theme song used to be a cha-cha version of "Hooray for Hollywood". "FX loved the show, but wanted to take it out of the entertainment industry", Day explained. "We had a music supervisor called Ray Espinola and we said, 'Give us everything you have in a sort of Leave It to Beaver with a big-band swing kind of feel', and the majority of the songs are from what he sent over. When you set it against what these characters were doing - which oftentimes can be perceived as quite despicable, or wrong - it really disarmed the audience. It just became our go-to library of songs." Many of Kiessling's other orchestral production music compositions underscore the show such as "Hotsy-Totsy", "On your Bike", and "Honey Bunch". "We were leaning toward 'Off Broadway' to be the theme song", Day said. "But John Landgraf, the president of the network, really liked 'Temptation Sensation' and he put his foot down. Now I'm happy it's the theme tune. But it is an odd title."

Kiessling's number "A Whiff of Perfume" is featured in the Lasagna Cat video, "Sex Survey Results".

== Discography ==
Studio albums

- That's Music (1965)
- Happy Rallye (1968)
- Das Orchester Heinz Kiessling - Symphonie for Lovers (1968)
- Young Sound (1969)
- Travel Guide (1969)
- Magic Violins (1969)
- Today's Music (1972)
- Heinz Kiessling's Playland (1974)
- Flying Places (1990)
