= The Man from the Diners' Club =

1963 film by Frank Tashlin

- Theatrical release poster
- Directed by: Frank Tashlin
- Written by: William Peter Blatty; John Fenton Murray
- Produced by: William Bloom
- Starring: Danny Kaye; Cara Williams; Martha Hyer; Telly Savalas
- Cinematography: Hal Mohr
- Edited by: William A. Lyon
- Music by: Stu Phillips
- Distributed by: Columbia Pictures
- Release date: April 17, 1963
- Running time: 96 min
- Country: United States
- Language: English

The Man from the Diners' Club is a 1963 comedy film starring Danny Kaye and directed by Frank Tashlin. It was made by Ampersand and Dena Productions and released by Columbia Pictures.

== Plot ==
Foots Pulardos is a mobster who intends to flee to Mexico with his moll Sugar Pye. In the meantime, he applies for a Diners Club charge card that is mistakenly approved by a meek clerk named Ernie Klenk, who is told to retrieve it from Foots.

Ernie arrives at Foots' gym that Foots uses as a front for his racketeering operations. Foots finds out that they share a unique physical similarity, which gives him an idea: he will burn down the gym, with Ernie in it, and change identities to fool the law.

Complications ensue, and the more involved that Ernie gets with Sugar, the more jealous his girlfriend Lucy becomes. And when Foots and Sugar head for the airport, Ernie must stop them.

== Cast ==
- Danny Kaye as Ernest Klenk
- Cara Williams as Sugar Pye
- Martha Hyer as Lucy
- Telly Savalas as Foots Pulardos
- Everett Sloane as Martindale
- Kaye Stevens as Bea
- George Kennedy as George
- Ann Morgan Guilbert as Ella Trask
- Harry Dean Stanton as a Beatnik (uncredited)

== Production ==
The film was produced by William Bloom from a screenplay by William Peter Blatty and John Fenton Murray. The music score was conducted by Stu Phillips and the cinematographer was Hal Mohr.

== See also ==
- List of American films of 1963
- Diners Club International
- Credit card fraud
- Code 10
