= The Shadow on the Window =

1957 American film noir crime film

- Theatrical release poster
- Directed by: William Asher
- Screenplay by: Leo Townsend; David P. Harmon
- Based on: Missing Witness; 1954 Cosmopolitan by John Hawkins; Ward Hawkins
- Produced by: Jonie Taps
- Starring: Philip Carey; Betty Garrett; John Drew Barrymore; Jerry Mathers
- Cinematography: Frank G. Carson
- Edited by: William A. Lyon
- Music by: George Duning
- Color process: Black and white
- Production company: Columbia Pictures
- Distributed by: Columbia Pictures
- Release date: March 6, 1957 (United States)
- Running time: 76 minutes 73 minutes (Encore-Mystery Library Print)
- Country: United States
- Language: English

The Shadow on the Window is a 1957 American film noir crime film directed by William Asher and starring Philip Carey, Betty Garrett and John Drew Barrymore. The screenplay involves a boy (Jerry Mathers) who is traumatized after seeing his mother being terrorized by thugs.

== Plot ==
Upon seeing his mother Linda terrorized by three thugs, young Petey (Jerry Mathers) is traumatized and wanders off. Truck drivers find him and the boy is taken to police headquarters, where he is recognized as the son of detective Tony Atlas (Philip Carey).

Petey is in shock and cannot even recognize his dad, much less explain what happened. Three young men - Joey (Gerald Sarracini), Gil (Corey Allen), and Jess (John Drew Barrymore) - are holding Linda Atlas hostage in the home of a man named Canfield (Watson Downs), for whom she had been working freelance as a stenographer.

In the course of robbery, Canfield has been killed and the three are now arguing incessantly about whether to also kill Linda; they think she is the only eyewitness and do not believe her when she tells them she has a son and is worried about where he has gone.

At one point, Canfield's niece and her husband come looking for him, because he had missed his regular dinner date at their home. When the couple sees Linda's car, they assume the man is entertaining a woman; they leave.

Gil slips away to retrieve a gun from his mother's and stepfather's apartment. Tony and the police, in the meantime, have had some investigative success and arrive at the apartment while Gil is there. The young man runs, exchanges gunfire with Tony and is ultimately killed. Tony finds Linda's wallet in Gil's pocket.

Eventually, the truckers are located and are able to provide an idea of the general vicinity where they found the boy. The police take Petey to this area and he recognizes a tractor; on the ground they find one of his toy cowboy guns. Tony's men surround the house and, when they enter, they find Canfield's body and discover that Joey, too, is dead. Jess had located a gun upstairs in the home and the two had struggled for it. Jess holds Linda at gunpoint, but Tony manages to disarm him.

At the sight of his mother, Petey emerges from his state of shock.

== Cast ==
- Philip Carey as Tony Atlas
- Betty Garrett as Linda Atlas
- John Drew Barrymore as Jess Reber (credited as John Barrymore Jr.)
- Corey Allen as Gil Ramsey
- Gerald Sarracini as Joey Gomez
- Jerry Mathers as Petey Atlas
- Sam Gilman as Sgt. Paul Denke
- Rusty Lane as Capt. McQuade
- Ainslie Pryor as Dr. Hodges
- Paul Picerni as Bigelow
- William Leslie as Stuart
- Doreen Woodbury as Molly
- Ellie Kent as Girl

== See also ==
- List of American films of 1957
