= Quebec (1951 film) =

1951 American historical drama directed by George Templeton

- Directed by: George Templeton
- Written by: Alan Le May
- Produced by: Alan Le May
- Starring: John Drew Barrymore; Corinne Calvet; Barbara Rush; Patric Knowles; John Hoyt
- Cinematography: W. Howard Greene
- Edited by: Jack Ogilvie
- Music by: Edward H. Plumb; Nathan Van Cleave
- Distributed by: Paramount Pictures
- Release date: March 15, 1951
- Running time: 85 minutes
- Country: United States
- Language: English

Quebec is a 1951 American historical drama film directed by George Templeton and written by Alan Le May. Set in 1837, the film stars John Drew Barrymore in a fictional account of the Lower Canada Rebellion.

== Plot ==
The film tells the tale of Stephanie Durossac, also known as Lafleur, a fiery pro-independence leader, and Mark Douglas, a man who discovers that Lafleur is his long-lost mother, whom he had believed to have been deceased. Lafleur's actions create problems because she is also the wife of the British governor of the province. She ultimately sacrifices herself to prevent Douglas from being taken hostage. A military assault is launched against the British fortress.

== Cast ==
- John Drew Barrymore as Mark Douglas
- Corinne Calvet as Mademoiselle Stephanie Durossac / Lafleur
- Barbara Rush as Madelon
- Patric Knowles as Charles Douglas
- John Hoyt as Father Antoine

== Production ==
The film was shot on location in Quebec with many local actors and captured sites including the Citadelle of Quebec, Montmorency Falls and the Quebec countryside. Quebec also features Patsy Ruth Miller, a former silent-screen star making her first screen appearance since 1931.

== Comic-book adaptation ==
- Eastern Color Movie Love #8 (April 1951)

== See also ==
- Quebec nationalism
- Quebec independence movement
- History of Quebec
- Timeline of Quebec history
- Patriote movement
