= The Sundowners (1950 film) =

1950 film

- Directed by: George Templeton
- Written by: Alan Le May
- Based on: Thunder in the Dust; 1934 novel by Alan Le May
- Produced by: Alan Le May; George Templeton
- Starring: Robert Preston; John Drew Barrymore; Chill Wills; Jack Elam
- Cinematography: Winton C. Hoch
- Edited by: Jack Ogilvie
- Music by: Alberto Colombo; Leonid Raab; Rudy Schrager
- Production company: Le May-Templeton Pictures
- Distributed by: Eagle-Lion Films
- Release dates: 2 February 1950 (United States); 4 May 1950 (New York City)
- Running time: 84 minutes
- Country: United States
- Language: English

The Sundowners is a 1950 American Technicolor Western film directed by George Templeton, starring Robert Preston and featuring John Drew Barrymore (billed as John Barrymore, Jr.), Robert Sterling, Chill Wills, and Jack Elam. The film is also known as Thunder in the Dust in the United Kingdom.

== Plot ==
A rash of cattle rustling leads to a range war, centered on the disputed grazing rights to a fertile canyon. Hostilities escalate with the arrival of a gunman, who disrupts both sides in the conflict.

== Cast ==
A 1950 film review lists the cast as follows:

- Robert Preston as James Cloud ('Kid Wichita')
- Robert Sterling as Tom Cloud
- John Drew Barrymore (in his film debut) as Jeff Cloud
- Chill Wills as Sam Beers
- Cathy Downs as Kathleen Boyce
- John Litel as John Gall
- Jack Elam as Earl Boyce
- Don Haggerty as Elmer Gall
- Stanley Price as Steve Fletcher
- Clem Fuller as Turkey
- Frank Cordell as Jim Strake
- Dave Kashner as Gill Batson

== Soundtrack ==
- "O'Riley" (Written by Alberto Colombo)
