= John Blyth Barrymore =

American actor (born 1954)

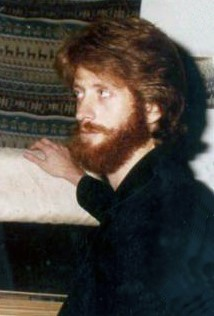
- Barrymore in 1982
- Born: John Blyth Barrymore Jr. May 15, 1954 (age 72); Manhattan, New York City, U.S.
- Occupation: Actor
- Years active: 1967–present
- Children: 3
- Parents: Cara Williams (mother); John Drew Barrymore (father)
- Relatives: Drew Barrymore (half-sister)
- Family: Barrymore

John Blyth Barrymore Jr. (born May 15, 1954) is an American actor. He is known for his role as Zeke in the 1970s television series Kung Fu, which was his first role on television.

== Biography ==
John Blyth Barrymore Jr. was born to John Drew Barrymore and Cara Williams. As such, he is from the famous Barrymore family: He is the half-brother of American actress Drew Barrymore, as well as the grandnephew of Ethel Barrymore and Lionel Barrymore. He is of partial Irish descent through his great-grandfather, actor Maurice Costello. John has stated that he does not remember if he met his aunt Diana Barrymore, who was also an actress.

Like his father, John has had a sporadic career in film and television, mainly appearing in shock horror movies and comedies.

After John and Drew's half-sister Jessica Barrymore was found dead in her vehicle in 2014, he publicly criticized Drew for not being receptive to forming a relationship with either him or Jessica.

== Filmography ==
Year	Title	Role	Notes
1967	Me and Benjy	Petie	Television Film
1975	Kung Fu	Zeke	4 episodes
1976	Baby Blue Marine	Idiot #2	
1978	The One Man Jury	Policeman #1	
1978	Feedback	Hoodlum	
1979	Nocturna	Punk vampire	
1980	Lou Grant	Harold	Episode: "Cameras"
1981	Americana	John / Jack	
1981	Smokey Bites the Dust	Harold	
1981	Full Moon High	Student	
1982	Lou Grant	Marc Pauley	Episode: "Dogs"
1982	Trick or Treats	Mad Doctor	
1984	Hard to Hold	Recording Engineer	
1990	Cry-Baby	Additional voices	Uncredited
1990	Crazy People	Additional voices	
1990	The Bonfire of the Vanities	Restaurant Manager	Uncredited
1990	Solar Crisis	Avery	
1991	Ted and Venus	Patient #1	
1992	Landslide	Additional voice	
1992	Love Crimes	Additional voices	
1994	Mind Twister	Pizza Delivery Boy	
1994	Inner Sanctum 2	Hotel Manager	
1996	Masseuse	Robert Glass	
1997	Hybrid	Dr. Paul Hamilton	
2013	Before I Sleep	Pianist	
2015	The Legacy of Avril Kyte	Strange Man / Tess	
2015	Mansion of Blood	Mayor Augustus Harold	
2016	Heavenly Sin	Grandpa	
2016	Dances with Werewolves	Driver #2	
2017	Hitchhiker Massacre	Floyd / Slim	
2017	Fake News	Thomas	
2017	Lasagna Cat	Unnamed character	Episode: "07/27/1978"
2018	Tales of Frankenstein	Vincent	
