= Hollywood Canteen =

Former entertainment venue for military personnel

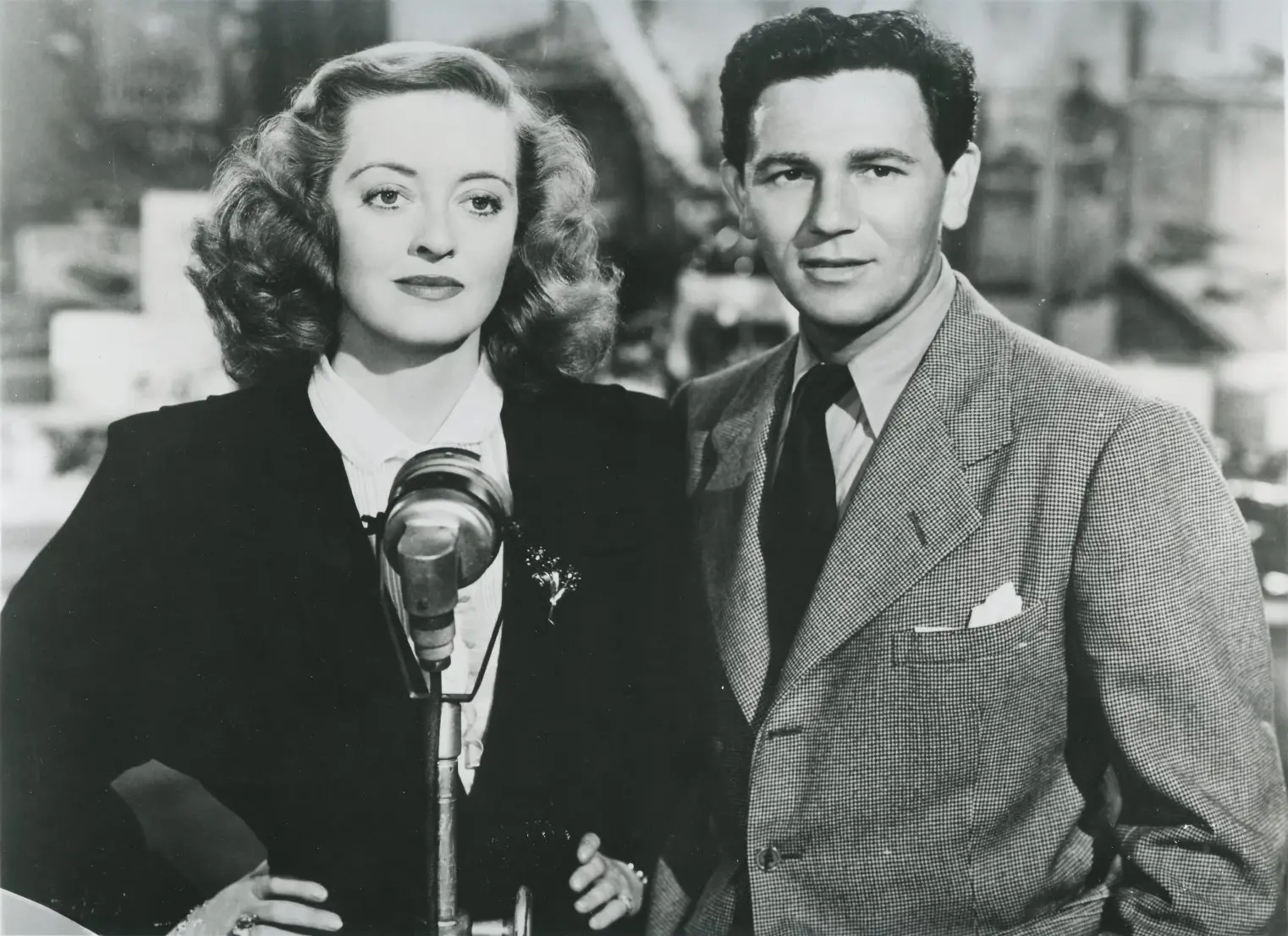
Bette Davis and John Garfield, co-founders of the Hollywood Canteen.

The Hollywood Canteen operated at 1451 North Cahuenga Boulevard in the Los Angeles, California, neighborhood of Hollywood between October 3, 1942, and November 22, 1945, as a club offering food, dancing, and entertainment for enlisted men and women, who were usually on their way overseas during World War II. Even though the majority of visitors were US servicemen, the canteen was open to allied countries as well as women in all branches of service. Their tickets for admission were just their uniforms, and everything at the canteen was free of charge.

The canteen was co-founded by the actors Bette Davis and John Garfield. The East Coast counterpart was the New York City–based Stage Door Canteen, which featured Broadway stars and was also celebrated in a film, Stage Door Canteen (1943).

Not to be confused with the modern-era unrelated Hollywood Canteen cafe (1006 North Seward Street); Hollywood Guild and Canteen (1284 North Crescent Heights Boulevard); or the canteen of the Hollywood USO (1654 North Cahuenga; later, 1531 North Cahuenga; later, 6225 Hollywood Boulevard), the Bob Hope USO Club in the LAX Theme Building, or the Beverly Hills USO at The Beverly Hills Hotel.

== History ==
=== Background ===
In 1942, Hollywood's entertainment industry members joined forces to form the Hollywood Canteen. Actors Bette Davis and John Garfield are credited with organizing the canteen, inspired by Garfield's visit to Manhattan's Stage Door Canteen (operated by the American Theatre Wing). Davis and Garfield began enlisting an executive board of directors (later including Bob Hope), who in turn elected a slate of officers which included Davis as president and Garfield as one of its vice-presidents. They would both maintain their elected positions throughout the entirety of the war and thus, the Hollywood Canteen's duration. Other officers included Jean Lewin as secretary, Al Ybarra as treasurer, and musicians' union leader J.K. Wallace as another vice-president. Davis also requested the assistance of Jules Stein, head of the Music Corporation of America, to help as a financial advisor.

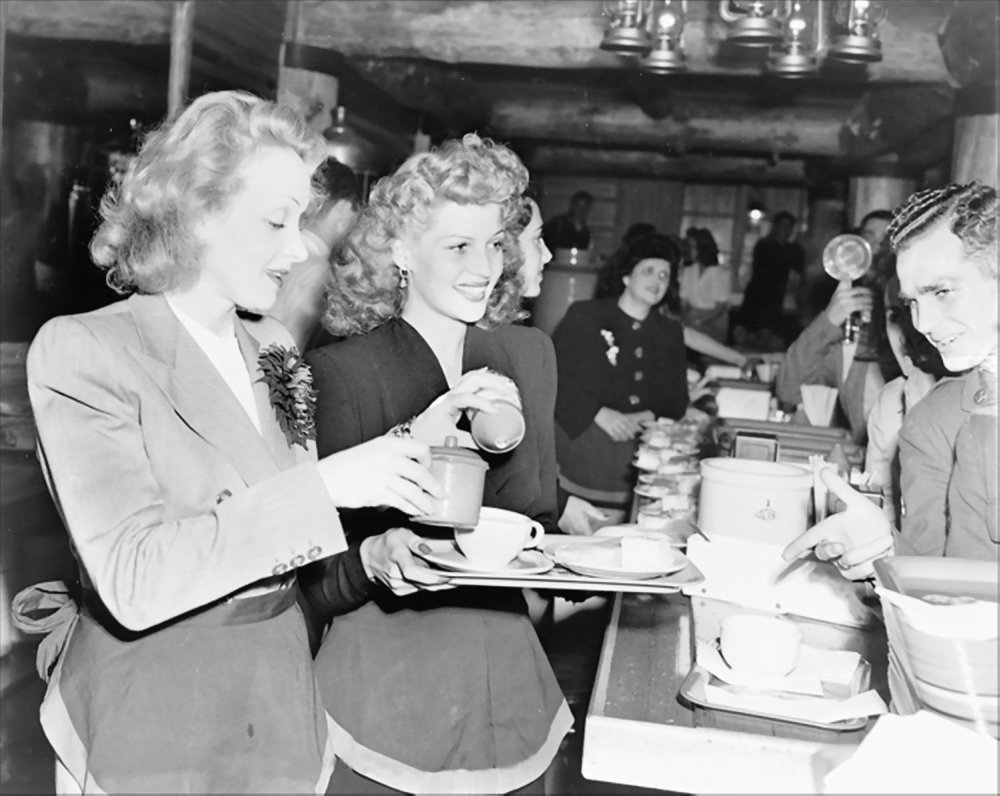
Marlene Dietrich (left) and Rita Hayworth serve food to soldiers at the Hollywood Canteen in 1942.

Garfield, Davis, and the rest of the elected officers then sought an establishment for their West Coast canteen. They found an abandoned nightclub, formerly known as "The Red Barn" or "Rio Grande Hall". They also enlisted support from 42 different guilds and unions within Hollywood's creative community, who sponsored the endeavor and amended their by-laws, which then enabled those individuals to volunteer their time and labor free of compensation. Numerous carpenters, electricians, plumbers, and other trades within the industry worked alongside the stars with donated materials to refurbish the building. Actor Richard Whorf painted murals along the walls, maintaining the western theme. Davis also contacted the Hollywood Victory Committee, which was associated with the Screen Actors Guild and chaired by James Cagney, in which entertainers were often sent out to military camps and on war bond drives. She requested and received consent to contact members directly regarding their participation in the Hollywood Canteen.

The first fundraiser for the new canteen came the month prior to its opening, courtesy of the film premiere of The Talk of the Town (1942), starring Cary Grant, Jean Arthur, and Ronald Colman. At the behest of publicist Bob Taplinger, each ticket was coupled with an invite to the afterparty at Ciro's nightclub. Proceeds went directly to the Hollywood Canteen, and were estimated to be over $5,000.

Davis was remanded on medical bedrest for exhaustion a week prior to the grand opening, following the completion of filming Watch on the Rhine (1943). However, she was present for opening night. Irene Dunne presided over a Hollywood Canteen committee luncheon at the Ambassador Hotel in Los Angeles, in which local merchants and vendors gathered to discuss various supplies to donate for the following week's opening.

=== Grand opening ===
On Saturday, October 3, 1942, the Hollywood Canteen opened its doors. in a former livery stable at 1451 Cahuenga Boulevard in Los Angeles. Thousands of soldiers, sailors, and other servicemen arrived to partake in the festivities. Eddie Cantor was the master of ceremonies on opening night, while president Bette Davis gave a speech thanking everyone from all the unions and guilds for their hard work and contributions. The venue opened Monday–Saturday evenings from 7pm to midnight. On Sundays, it was open from 2 to 8pm. There was a new entertainment show every hour and a half, at which point the next wave of waiting servicemen shuffled inside.

More than 3,000 celebrities and industry personnel volunteered to be anything, from hostesses, waiting staff, busboys, cooks, and dishwashers to cigarette vendors, soda jerks, dancing partners, and mopping at the end of the night. Enlisted men needed only their uniforms to enter the facility. The food, refreshments (no alcohol), cigarettes, dances, autographs, and entertainment were all free. Stars were required to pay $50 to sit in the bleachers; otherwise, be willing to work the floor. There were two small corner tables for individuals who were neither servicemen nor celebrities. These were known as "The Angel's Tables", and cost $100 each.

The stars were seen multitasking in various roles from one night to the next. Davis was seen handing out cigarettes to the soldiers. Laird Cregar was said to have gotten "dishwasher hands" from being at the sink too long. Betty Grable did the Jitterbug with dozens of cadets. Abbott and Costello brought laughter to the troops, and live music was ubiquitous. Maria Riva, Marlene Dietrich's daughter, recalled an anecdote where her mother decided to wash dishes and was joined by Hedy Lamarr. According to Riva, Davis quipped, "Get those two krauts out of the kitchen!"

Press agent Mack Millar consistently helped generate further publicity. Cantor donned a Santa Claus suit at the first Christmas gathering, and handed out a variety pack of gifts to each enlisted serviceman, which included cigarettes, candy, chewing gum, a diary, razor blades, a wallet, a sewing kit, and articles of clothing. By the end of 1942, vice-president John Garfield noted that the canteen was serving approximately 5,000 guys each night on weekends; and 20,000 throughout the rest of each week.

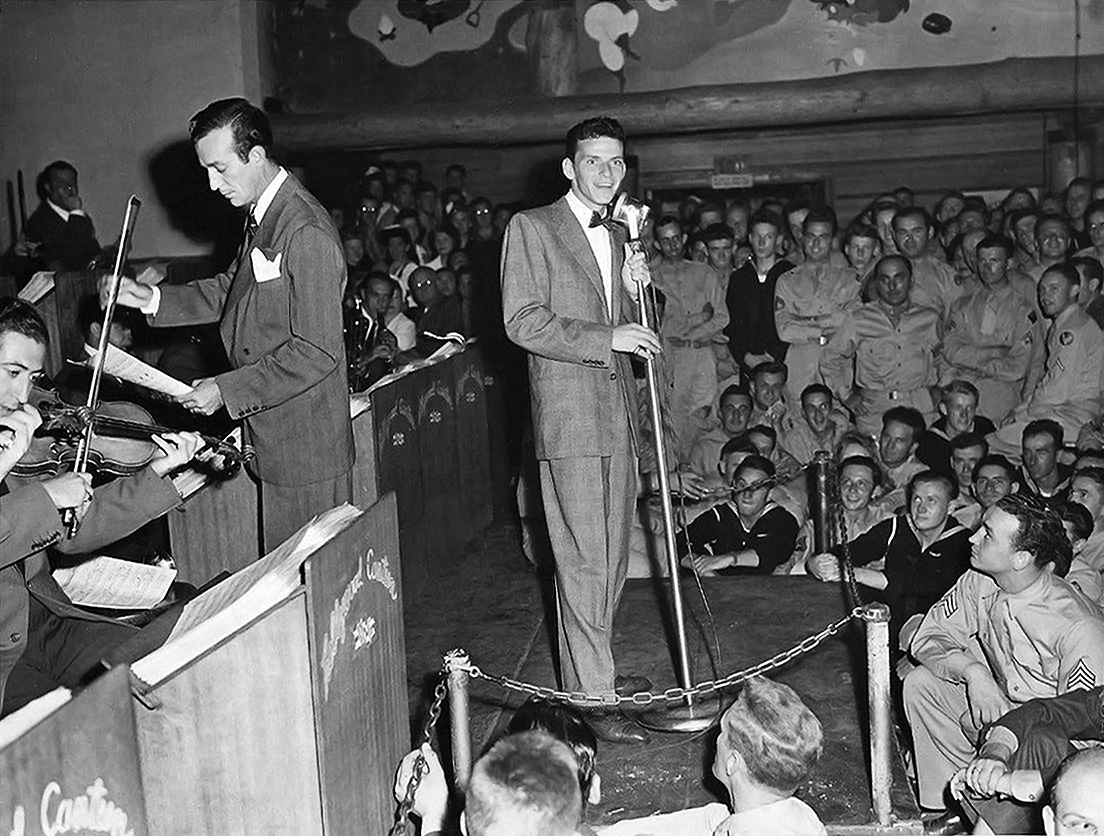
Frank Sinatra (center) performing at the Hollywood Canteen for U.S. servicemen in 1943, accompanied by Harry James (left, standing with sheet music) and his big band.

In September 1943, Sgt. Carl Bell, a Purple Heart recipient from Rising Star, Texas, was the 1,000,000th serviceman to visit the Hollywood Canteen. He received kisses from many female stars, including Dietrich, Grable, Lana Turner, and Deanna Durbin. Jean Gabin, Dietrich's boyfriend at the time, would often dodge the spotlight and remain in the kitchen. One night, while Dietrich was sweeping up near closing time, a soldier approached, commandeered the broom to assume sweeping duties, and stated, "Look, honey, you have to do this enough at home."

Although segregation still occurred elsewhere in the 1940s, including USO policies, both the Stage Door and Hollywood Canteens permitted integrated socialization and mixed dancing. The canteen also unveiled a "Hall of Honor" at its first anniversary gala (held in November 1943). The plaques commemorated those film industry representatives who were serving in the war.

=== In media ===
An array of stars appeared in cameo roles, many of them musical, in the Warner Bros. film, Thank Your Lucky Stars (1943). Each star had been paid $50,000 by the studio, which was subsequently donated to the Hollywood Canteen.

By 1944, the canteen had become so popular that Warner Bros paid $250,000 for the rights to produce a movie titled Hollywood Canteen, just as its predecessor, Stage Door Canteen, had done the previous year. Starring Joan Leslie and Robert Hutton as fictional characters, the film also featured a plethora of stars, many of whom had volunteered at the real canteen, playing themselves. It was written and directed by Delmer Daves. Warner Bros. donated 40% of proceeds from the film to both the Hollywood Canteen and the Stage Door Canteen in New York.

=== Legacy ===
The canteen opened its doors for the final time on the afternoon of Thursday, November 22, 1945, which was Thanksgiving Day. More than 5,000 G.I.s flowed in and out, enjoying turkey dinners and entertainment. Kay Kyser and Bette Davis led a chorus of "Auld Lang Syne" in commemoration of the past three years of service, in which the Hollywood Canteen and its thousands of volunteers had entertained more than 3,000,000 in uniform.

Once the canteen was officially closed, they had a remainder of funds totaling more than $500,000, including profits from the titular film. The committee and directors aimed to establish a fund that would continue to aid veterans. After closing, for the next two decades, the canteen continued as a foundation, donating nearly $1 million to veterans hospitals and other philanthropic causes. Jules Stein succeeded Davis as president in May 1966.

The structure where the canteen was once located no longer exists. In December 1966, by which time it had been converted into the "Off-Hollywood Boulevard" theater, a bulldozer leveled it into a parking lot. Currently, a parking garage and a building operated by CNN are located on the site, which is just south of Sunset Boulevard.

== Volunteers ==
Noted celebrities who donated their services at the Hollywood Canteen are listed.

- Bud Abbott & Lou Costello
- Larry Adler
- Adrian
- Iris Adrian
- Brian Aherne
- Eddie Albert
- Robert Alda
- Kay Aldridge
- Katharine Alexander
- Barbara Jo Allen
- Fred Allen
- Sara Allgood
- Astrid Allwyn
- June Allyson
- Carmen Amaya
- Don Ameche
- Eddie "Rochester" Anderson
- Ernest Anderson
- Judith Anderson
- Dana Andrews
- The Andrews Sisters
- Heather Angel
- Evelyn Ankers
- Eve Arden
- Harold Arlen
- Richard Arlen
- Louis Armstrong
- Desi Arnaz
- Charles Arnt
- Jean Arthur
- Dorothy Arzner
- Fred Astaire
- Mary Astor
- Roscoe Ates
- Mischa Auer
- Lew Ayres
- Lauren Bacall
- Faith Bacon
- Irving Bacon
- Lynne Baggett
- Lucille Ball
- Tallulah Bankhead
- Vilma Bánky
- Theda Bara
- Lynn Bari
- Jess Barker
- Lex Barker
- Binnie Barnes
- Wendy Barrie
- Edgar Barrier
- Don "Red" Barry
- Diana Barrymore
- Ethel Barrymore
- Lionel Barrymore
- Freddie Bartholomew
- Albert Bassermann
- Anne Baxter
- Warner Baxter
- John Beal
- Louise Beavers
- Noah Beery Jr.
- Noah Beery Sr.
- Wallace Beery
- Ralph Bellamy
- Robert Benchley
- William Bendix
- William "Billy" Benedict
- Bruce Bennett
- Constance Bennett
- Joan Bennett
- Jack Benny
- Edgar Bergen
- Ingrid Bergman
- Busby Berkeley
- Milton Berle
- Irving Berlin
- Willie Best
- Turhan Bey
- Charles Bickford
- Julie Bishop
- Vivian Blaine
- Janet Blair
- Mel Blanc
- Clara Blandick
- Joan Blondell
- Betsy Bloomingdale
- Monte Blue
- Ann Blyth
- Humphrey Bogart
- Mary Boland
- Ray Bolger
- Ward Bond
- Beulah Bondi
- Olive Borden
- Victor Borge
- Frank Borzage
- Clara Bow
- Lee Bowman
- Mayor Fletcher Bowron
- William Boyd
- Charles Boyer
- Eddie Bracken
- Sybil Brand
- Bobby Breen
- El Brendel
- Tom Breneman
- Walter Brennan
- Evelyn Brent
- George Brent
- Felix Bressart
- Fanny Brice
- Lloyd Bridges
- Leslie Brooks
- Lillian Bronson
- Barbara Brown
- Clarence Brown
- Joe E. Brown
- Les Brown & His
  Band of Renown
- Nigel Bruce
- Virginia Bruce
- Edgar Buchanan
- Billie Burke
- George Burns & Gracie Allen
- Mae Busch
- Charles Butterworth
- Red Buttons
- Spring Byington
- Bruce Cabot
- James Cagney
- Jeanne Cagney
- Louis Calhern
- Cab Calloway & His Orchestra
- Rod Cameron
- Candy Candido
- Judy Canova
- Eddie Cantor
- Harry Carey Jr.
- Harry Carey Sr.
- Olive Carey
- Kitty Carlisle
- Mary Carlisle
- Richard Carlson
- Hoagy Carmichael
- John Carradine
- Alma Carroll
- Georgia Carroll
- John Carroll
- Leo G. Carroll
- Madeleine Carroll
- Nancy Carroll
- Jack Carson
- Ben Carter
- Benny Carter
- Adriana Caselotti
- Carmen Cavallaro
- Marge Champion
- Lon Chaney Jr.
- Ilka Chase
- Charlie Chaplin
- Marguerite Chapman
- Cyd Charisse
- Ruth Chatterton
- Rita Christiani
- Agatha Christie
- Dane Clark
- Mae Clarke
- Lee J. Cobb
- Charles Coburn
- Steve Cochran
- Harry Cohn
- Claudette Colbert
- Patricia Collinge
- Ronald Colman
- Jerry Colonna
- Perry Como
- Betty Compson
- Joyce Compton
- Chester Conklin
- Richard Conte
- Donald Cook
- Gary Cooper
- Gladys Cooper
- Melville Cooper
- Ben Corbett
- Rita Corday
- Ricardo Cortez
- Dolores Costello
- Sam Coslow
- Joseph Cotten
- Count Basie & His Orchestra
- Alexander Courage
- Noël Coward
- Buster Crabbe
- James Craig
- Jeanne Crain
- Joan Crawford
- Laird Cregar
- Donald Crisp
- Richard Cromwell
- Hume Cronyn
- Bing Crosby
- Xavier Cugat
- George Cukor
- Robert Cummings
- Alan Curtis
- Michael Curtiz
- Carmen D'Antonio
- Alexander D'Arcy
- Howard da Silva
- Dan Dailey
- Esther Dale
- Virginia Dale
- Cass Daley
- John Dall
- Dorothy Dandridge
- Ruby Dandridge
- Bebe Daniels
- Helmut Dantine
- Linda Darnell
- Jane Darwell
- Jules Dassin
- Harry Davenport
- Delmer Daves
- Marion Davies
- Bette Davis
- Joan Davis
- Dennis Day
- Doris Day
- Laraine Day
- Yvonne De Carlo
- Pedro de Cordoba
- Olivia de Havilland
- Priscilla Dean
- Frances Dee
- Don DeFore
- Gloria DeHaven
- John Dehner
- Albert Dekker
- Dolores del Río
- The Delta Rhythm Boys
- William Demarest
- Cecil B. DeMille
- Jo-Carroll Dennison
- John Derek
- William Desmond
- Andy Devine
- William Dieterle
- Marlene Dietrich
- Walt Disney
- Richard Dix
- Jean Dixon
- Edward Dmytryk
- Robert Donat
- Brian Donlevy
- Dolores Donlon
- Jeff Donnell
- Ruth Donnelly
- Ann Doran
- Philip Dorn
- Jimmy Dorsey
- Tommy Dorsey
- Melvyn Douglas
- Billie Dove
- Dona Drake
- Paul Draper
- Louise Dresser
- Ellen Drew
- Margaret Dumont
- Steffi Duna
- Katherine Dunham
- James Dunn
- Irene Dunne
- Ralph Dunn
- Jimmy Durante
- Deanna Durbin
- Dan Duryea
- Ann Dvorak
- Margaret Early
- Nelson Eddy
- Cliff Edwards
- Florence Eldridge
- Duke Ellington & His
  Famous Orchestra
- James Ellison
- Faye Emerson
- Richard Erdman
- Stuart Erwin
- Jill Esmond
- Dale Evans
- Douglas Fairbanks Jr.
- Jinx Falkenburg
- Glenda Farrell
- Frank Fay
- Alice Faye
- Louise Fazenda
- Leslie Fenton
- Esther Fernández
- Stepin Fetchit
- Betty Field
- Virginia Field
- Dorothy Fields
- Gracie Fields
- W. C. Fields
- Barry Fitzgerald
- Ella Fitzgerald
- Geraldine Fitzgerald
- James Flavin
- Rhonda Fleming
- Bess Flowers
- Errol Flynn
- Nina Foch
- Henry Fonda
- Benson Fong
- Joan Fontaine
- Mary Forbes
- Glenn Ford
- John Ford
- Wallace Ford
- Preston Foster
- Susanna Foster
- Victor Francen
- Kay Francis
- Noel Francis
- Richard Fraser
- William Frawley
- Jane Frazee
- Mona Freeman
- Betty Furness
- Jean Gabin
- The Gabor Sisters
- Ceferino García
- Reginald Gardiner
- Ava Gardner
- John Garfield
- William Gargan
- Judy Garland
- Peggy Ann Garner
- Greer Garson
- Marjorie Gateson
- Janet Gaynor
- Gladys George
- Frances Gifford
- Billy Gilbert
- Dizzy Gillespie
- Ann Gillis
- Virginia Gilmore
- Dorothy Gish
- Lillian Gish
- James Gleason
- Paulette Goddard
- Golden Gate Quartet
- Samuel Goldwyn
- Minna Gombell
- Thomas Gomez
- Benny Goodman
- Leo Gorcey
- Hayes Gordon
- Mary Gordon
- Ruth Gordon
- Edmund Goulding
- Betty Grable
- Sheilah Graham
- Gloria Grahame
- Farley Granger
- Stewart Granger
- Cary Grant
- Bonita Granville
- Charley Grapewin
- Sid Grauman
- Kathryn Grayson
- Angela Greene
- Sydney Greenstreet
- Charlotte Greenwood
- Virginia Grey
- Corinne Griffith
- Paul Guilfoyle
- Anne Gwynne
- Sara Haden
- William Haines
- Alan Hale Jr.
- Alan Hale Sr.
- Jonathan Hale
- Jack Haley
- Adelaide Hall
- Margaret Hamilton
- Neil Hamilton
- Lionel Hampton
- Ann Harding
- Mildred Harris
- Phil Harris
- Moss Hart
- Paul Harvey
- Signe Hasso
- Hurd Hatfield
- Raymond Hatton
- June Haver
- June Havoc
- Howard Hawks
- Richard Haydn
- Helen Hayes
- Dick Haymes
- Louis Hayward
- Susan Hayward
- Rita Hayworth
- Van Heflin
- Mark Hellinger
- Fay Helm
- Sonja Henie
- Paul Henreid
- William Henry
- Katharine Hepburn
- Hugh Herbert
- Wendy Hiller
- Earl "Fatha" Hines
- Alfred Hitchcock
- John Hodiak
- Portland Hoffa
- Fay Holden
- William Holden
- Billie Holiday
- Sterling Holloway
- Celeste Holm
- Libby Holman
- Jack Holt
- Tim Holt
- Darla Hood
- Bob Hope
- Miriam Hopkins
- Hedda Hopper
- William Hopper
- Lena Horne
- Edward Everett Horton
- Shep Houghton
- John Howard
- Rochelle Hudson
- Howard Hughes
- Benita Hume
- Marsha Hunt
- Kim Hunter
- Ruth Hussey
- John Huston
- Walter Huston
- Barbara Hutton
- Betty Hutton
- Ina Ray Hutton
- Robert Hutton
- Leila Hyams
- Frieda Inescort
- Rex Ingram
- Ish Kabibble
- José Iturbi
- Burl Ives
- Eddie Jackson
- Dean Jagger
- Harry James
- Gloria Jean
- Isabel Jeans
- Anne Jeffreys
- Allen Jenkins
- George Jessel
- Erskine Johnson
- Noble Johnson
- Rita Johnson
- Van Johnson
- Al Jolson
- Allan Jones
- Jennifer Jones
- Marcia Mae Jones
- Spike Jones &
  His City Slickers
- Louis Jordan
- Garson Kanin
- Boris Karloff
- Danny Kaye
- Buster Keaton
- Ruby Keeler
- Gene Kelly
- Kitty Kelly
- Tommy Kelly
- Bill Kennedy
- Tom Kennedy
- Dorothea Kent
- Robert Kent
- Doris Kenyon
- Deborah Kerr
- Evelyn Keyes
- Guy Kibbee
- Andrea King
- The King Sisters
- Walter Kingsford
- Elyse Knox
- Henry Kolker
- Otto Kruger
- Gene Krupa
- Kay Kyser (+ Kollege
  of Musical Knowledge)
- Rod La Rocque
- Jack La Rue
- Alan Ladd
- Bert Lahr
- Veronica Lake
- Hedy Lamarr
- Molly Lamont
- Dorothy Lamour
- Elsa Lanchester
- Carole Landis
- Charles Lane
- The Lane Sisters
- Vicky Lane
- June Lang
- Fritz Lang
- Frances Langford
- Angela Lansbury
- Rosemary LaPlanche
- Ring Lardner Jr.
- Charles Laughton
- Stan Laurel &
  Oliver Hardy
- Peter Lawford
- Gertrude Lawrence
- Priscilla Lawson
- Francis Lederer
- Anna Lee
- Canada Lee
- Dixie Lee
- Dorothy Lee
- Peggy Lee
- Pinky Lee
- Vivien Leigh
- Mervyn LeRoy
- Ethelreda Leopold
- Joan Leslie
- Oscar Levant
- Sam Levene
- Diana Lewis
- Ted Lewis
- Mitchell Lewis
- Beatrice Lillie
- Kay Linaker
- Margaret Lindsay
- Anatole Litvak
- Mary Livingstone
- Doris Lloyd
- Frank Lloyd
- Harold Lloyd
- Norman Lloyd
- Gene Lockhart
- June Lockhart
- Kathleen Lockhart
- John Loder
- Anita Loos
- Peter Lorre
- Joan Lorring
- Joe Louis
- Anita Louise
- Bessie Love
- Edmund Lowe
- Myrna Loy
- Ernst Lubitsch
- Bela Lugosi
- Paul Lukas
- Keye Luke
- Ida Lupino
- Diana Lynn
- Jeffrey Lynn
- Ben Lyon
- Bert Lytell
- Jeanette MacDonald
- Moyna Macgill
- Dorothy Mackaill
- Aline MacMahon
- Fred MacMurray
- George Macready
- Madame Sul-Te-Wan
- Guy Madison
- Marjorie Main
- Dorothy Malone
- Rouben Mamoulian
- Joseph L. Mankiewicz
- Irene Manning
- Adele Mara
- Fredric March
- Margo
- Mona Maris
- Mae Marsh
- Alan Marshal
- Brenda Marshall
- Herbert Marshall
- Dr. Harry W. Martin
- Mary Martin
- Tony Martin
- The Marx Brothers
- James Mason
- Shirley Mason
- Ilona Massey
- Raymond Massey
- Matt Mattox
- Victor Mature
- Elsa Maxwell
- Marilyn Maxwell
- Louis B. Mayer
- Mitzi Mayfair
- Virginia Mayo
- Mike Mazurki
- Leo McCarey
- Joan McCracken
- Joel McCrea
- Hattie McDaniel
- Francis McDonald
- Grace McDonald
- Marie McDonald
- Roddy McDowall
- Dorothy McGuire
- Frank McHugh
- Fay McKenzie
- Victor McLaglen
- Stephen McNally
- Butterfly McQueen
- Donald Meek
- Lauritz Melchior
- Yehudi Menuhin
  (acc. Benjamin Britten)
- Adolphe Menjou
- Johnny Mercer
- Burgess Meredith
- Una Merkel
- Lynn Merrick
- Gary Merrill
- Charles Middleton
- Ray Middleton
- Lewis Milestone
- Ray Milland
- Ann Miller
- Glenn Miller & His Orchestra
- John Mills
- Vincente Minnelli
- Carmen Miranda
- Grant Mitchell
- Thomas Mitchell
- Robert Mitchum
- Maria Montez
- George Montgomery
- Robert Montgomery
- Colleen Moore
- Constance Moore
- Grace Moore
- Phil Moore
- Victor Moore
- Agnes Moorehead
- Dolores Moran
- Jackie Moran
- Mantan Moreland
- Antonio Moreno
- Dennis Morgan
- Frank Morgan
- Harry Morgan
- Michèle Morgan
- Ralph Morgan
- Patricia Morison
- Chester Morris
- Dorothy Morris
- Wayne Morris
- Alan Mowbray
- Jack Mower
- Esther Muir
- Jean Muir
- Paul Muni
- Ona Munson
- George Murphy
- Ken Murray
- Mae Murray
- Clarence Muse
- Conrad Nagel
- J. Carrol Naish
- Noreen Nash
- Alla Nazimova
- Tom Neal
- Jean Negulesco
- Pola Negri
- The Nicholas Brothers
- Gertrude Niesen
- Anna Q. Nilsson
- David Niven
- Doris Nolan
- Lloyd Nolan
- Ramón Novarro
- Ivor Novello
- George O'Brien
- Edmond O'Brien
- Margaret O'Brien
- Pat O'Brien
- Virginia O'Brien
- Donald O'Connor
- Una O'Connor
- Martha O'Driscoll
- Maureen O'Hara
- Dennis O'Keefe
- Barbara O'Neil
- Oona O'Neill
- Maureen O'Sullivan
- Jack Oakie
- Merle Oberon
- Edna May Oliver
- Laurence Olivier
- Victor Orsatti
- Maria Ouspenskaya
- Reginald Owen
- Janis Paige
- Robert Paige
- Eugene Pallette
- Franklin Pangborn
- Charlie "Yardbird" Parker
- Dorothy Parker
- Eleanor Parker
- Jean Parker
- Willard Parker
- Harriet Parsons
- Louella Parsons
- Pat Paterson
- Elizabeth Patterson
- Virginia Patton
- Katina Paxinou
- John Payne
- Gregory Peck
- Nat Pendleton
- Barbara Pepper
- Susan Peters
- Mary Pickford
- Walter Pidgeon
- The Pied Pipers
- Ezio Pinza
- ZaSu Pitts
- Cole Porter
- Dick Powell
- Eleanor Powell
- Jane Powell
- William Powell
- Tyrone Power
- Robert Preston
- Vincent Price
- William Prince
- LeRoy Prinz
- Roger Pryor
- John Qualen
- Richard Quine
- Anthony Quinn
- Frances Rafferty
- George Raft
- Ella Raines
- Claude Rains
- Jobyna Ralston
- Vera Ralston
- Marjorie Rambeau
- Sally Rand
- Amanda Randolph
- Lillian Randolph
- Basil Rathbone
- Martha Raye
- Ronald Reagan
- Donna Reed
- James Rennie
- Alma Reville
- Joyce Reynolds
- Marjorie Reynolds
- Buddy Rich
- John Ridgely
- Stanley Ridges
- Elisabeth Risdon
- The Ritz Brothers
- Hal Roach
- Lynne Roberts
- Willard Robertson
- Paul Robeson
- Gale Robbins
- Bill "Bojangles" Robinson
- Edward G. Robinson
- Flora Robson
- Charles "Buddy" Rogers
- Ginger Rogers
- Jean Rogers
- Roy Rogers (w/ "Trigger",
  a.k.a. Golden Cloud)
- Gilbert Roland
- Tony Romano
- Lina Romay
- Alex Romero
- Cesar Romero
- Mickey Rooney
- Rosario & Antonio
- "Slapsy Maxie" Rosenbloom
- Selena Royle
- Arthur Rubinstein
- Charlie Ruggles
- Sig Ruman
- Gail Russell
- Jane Russell
- Rosalind Russell
- Ann Rutherford
- Irene Ryan
- Peggy Ryan
- Robert Ryan
- S. Z. Sakall
- Olga San Juan
- George Sanders
- Ann Savage
- Natalie Schafer
- Dore Schary
- Joseph Schildkraut
- Hazel Scott
- Lizabeth Scott
- Martha Scott
- Randolph Scott
- Zachary Scott
- Dorothy Sebastian
- David O. Selznick
- Toni Seven
- Artie Shaw
- Robert Shayne
- Norma Shearer
- Ann Sheridan
- Anne Shirley
- Ann Shoemaker
- Dinah Shore
- Sylvia Sidney
- Phil Silvers
- Ginny Simms
- Simone Simon
- Mickey Simpson
- Russell Simpson
- Frank Sinatra
- Leo Singer's Midgets
- Six Hits and a Miss
- Red Skelton
- Sidney Skolsky
- Freddie Slack
- Walter Slezak
- Alexis Smith
- Kate Smith
- Queenie Smith
- Gale Sondergaard
- Sons of the Pioneers
- Ann Sothern
- Robert Stack
- Jo Stafford
- Lionel Stander
- Barbara Stanwyck
- Freddie Steele
- Jules C. Stein
- Robert Sterling
- Craig Stevens
- George Stevens
- K. T. Stevens
- Mark Stevens
- Risë Stevens
- James Stewart
- Paul Stewart
- Leopold Stokowski (w/
  NBC Symphony Orchestra)
- Lewis Stone
- Gale Storm
- Rose Stradner
- Billy Strayhorn
- Gloria Stuart
- Preston Sturges
- Charles Sullivan
- Gloria Swanson
- Blanche Sweet
- Sally Sweetland
- Joseph Szigeti
- Constance Talmadge
- Norma Talmadge
- Akim Tamiroff
- Jessica Tandy
- Norman Taurog
- Elizabeth Taylor
- Robert Taylor
- Ray Teal
- Shirley Temple
- Alice Terry
- Phillip Terry
- Heather Thatcher
- Phyllis Thaxter
- Danny Thomas
- John Charles Thomas
- Patty Thomas
- Marshall Thompson
- The Three Stooges
- Lawrence Tibbett
- Gene Tierney
- Martha Tilton
- George Tobias
- Dan Tobin
- Ann Todd
- Franchot Tone
- Regis Toomey
- Fred "Snowflake" Toones
- Mel Tormé &
  The Mel-Tones
- Audrey Totter
- Colleen Townsend
- Spencer Tracy
- Henry Travers
- Arthur Treacher
- Claire Trevor
- Sophie Tucker
- Tom Tully
- Lana Turner
- Tom Tyler
- Virginia Vale
- Rudy Vallée
- W. S. Van Dyke
- Gloria Vanderbilt
- Sarah Vaughan
- Conrad Veidt
- Lupe Vélez
- Veloz & Yolanda
- Vera-Ellen
- Martha Vickers
- Charles Victor
- Helen Vinson
- Theodore von Eltz
- Josef von Sternberg
- Erich von Stroheim
- Nancy Walker
- Robert Walker
- Beryl Wallace
- V. P. Henry A. Wallace
- Hal B. Wallis
- Raoul Walsh
- Pat Walshe
- H. B. Warner
- Jack L. Warner
- Ruth Warrick
- Buck Washington
  & John W. Bubbles
- Fredi Washington
- Ethel Waters
- Lucile Watson
- Amelita Ward
- John Wayne
- Doodles Weaver
- Marjorie Weaver
- Clifton Webb
- Virginia Weidler
- Johnny Weissmüller
- Orson Welles
- Virginia Welles
- Mae West
- Vera West
- Perc Westmore
- Bert Wheeler
- Arleen Whelan
- Leigh Whipper
- Alice White
- Jacqueline White
- Josh White
- O. Z. Whitehead
- Paul Whiteman
- Margaret Whiting
- Ernest Whitman
- Peter Whitney
- May Whitty
- Richard Whorf
- Mary Wickes
- Henry Wilcoxon
- Cornel Wilde
- Billy Wilder
- Warren William
- The Williams Brothers
- Esther Williams
- Mary Lou Williams
- Chill Wills
- Carey Wilson
- Don Wilson
- Dooley Wilson
- Gerald Wilson
- Lois Wilson
- Marie Wilson
- Teddy Wilson
- Walter Winchell
- Claire Windsor
- Toby Wing
- Charles Winninger
- Shelley Winters
- Jane Withers
- Anna May Wong
- Sam Wood
- Donald Woods
- Monty Woolley
- Constance Worth
- Fay Wray
- Cobina Wright Jr.
- Cobina Wright Sr.
- Teresa Wright
- Jane Wyatt
- Margaret Wycherly
- William Wyler
- Jane Wyman
- Ed Wynn
- Keenan Wynn
- Lillian Yarbo
- Loretta Young
- Robert Young
- Roland Young
- Blanche Yurka
- Darryl F. Zanuck
- Vera Zorina
- George Zucco

== The Hollywood Guild and Canteen ==
Several references to the Hollywood Canteen often erroneously list the address of The Hollywood Guild and Canteen, a similarly titled but distinct establishment, which was located at 1284 North Crescent Heights Boulevard in a home once owned by the estate of silent film actor Dustin Farnum. It was here that Anne "Mom" Lehr, wife of retired film executive Abraham Lehr, provided free meals and bunk beds for servicemen beyond the end of the second World War. Lehr also had her own rotation of volunteers, and was able to elicit contributions throughout the war from generous celebrities and benefactors as well, such as Tom Breneman (who paid for a swimming pool); Greer Garson (who donated a bamboo bar); and Lew Ayres (who wrote a check for $750, when the guild's bank account was overdrawn). When the home was razed in 1948, several news articles failed to distinguish between the two "Hollywood Canteens", which led to a persistent confusion between the two organizations. Anne Lehr died in 1951.

== Recognition ==
In 1946, Davis received an award from the War Department for Meritorious Service on behalf of her work for the Hollywood Canteen.

In 1983, the United States Department of Defense presented Davis with the Distinguished Civilian Service Award for her "dedicated, continuing support of the American armed forces".

== See also ==
- Hollywood Victory Committee
- The Mercury Wonder Show
- Show-Business at War (via The March of Time)
- Stage Door Canteen
