= Hollywood Canteen (film) =

1944 film by Delmer Daves

- Original theatrical poster
- Directed by: Delmer Daves
- Written by: Delmer Daves
- Produced by: Alex Gottlieb
- Starring: Joan Leslie; Robert Hutton; Dane Clark
- Cinematography: Bert Glennon
- Edited by: Christian Nyby
- Music by: Musical Director: Leo F. Forbstein; Musical Adaptation: Ray Heindorf
- Production company: Warner Bros. Pictures
- Distributed by: Warner Bros. Pictures
- Release dates: December 15, 1944 (New York City, premiere)
- Running time: 124 minutes
- Country: United States
- Language: English
- Budget: $2,126,000
- Box office: $4.2 million (US/ Canada rentals) or $5,452,000

Hollywood Canteen is a 1944 American musical romantic comedy film starring Joan Leslie, Robert Hutton, and Dane Clark, and features many stars (appearing as themselves) in cameo roles. and produced by Warner Bros. Pictures. The film was written and directed by Delmer Daves and received three Oscar nominations.

== Plot ==
Two soldiers on leave spend three nights at the Hollywood Canteen before returning to active duty in the South Pacific. Slim Green (Robert Hutton) is the millionth GI to enjoy the Canteen and consequently wins a date with Joan Leslie. The other GI, Sergeant Nolan (Dane Clark) gets to dance with Joan Crawford. Bette Davis and John Garfield give talks on the history of the Canteen. The soldiers enjoy a variety of musical numbers performed by a host of Hollywood stars, and also comedians, such as Jack Benny and his violin.

== Cameo appearances ==
The film's setting is the Hollywood Canteen, a free entertainment club open to servicemen. Many of those cameoing in the film had previously volunteered to work there or provide entertainment. They include: The Andrews Sisters, Jack Benny, Joe E. Brown, Eddie Cantor, Kitty Carlisle, Jack Carson, Joan Crawford, Faye Emerson, Sydney Greenstreet, Alan Hale Sr., Paul Henreid, Joan Leslie, Peter Lorre, Ida Lupino, Dorothy Malone, Dennis Morgan, Janis Paige, Eleanor Parker, Roy Rogers (with Trigger), S.Z. Sakall, Zachary Scott, Alexis Smith, Barbara Stanwyck, Jane Wyman, and Jimmy Dorsey.

The Golden Gate Quartet, an all-black quartet, makes a unique appearance. They had appeared at President Franklin D. Roosevelt's third inauguration—"firsts" for black performers—as well as in period movies.

Another cameo shows Joan McCracken straight from the musical Oklahoma! in a strong dance number reminiscent of her later dance in Good News.

The East Coast counterpart was the Stage Door Canteen, also celebrated in a 1943 film.

== Musical numbers ==
1. "Hollywood Canteen" by Ray Heindorf, M.K. Jerome, and Ted Koehler – sung by the Andrews Sisters behind titles.
2. "What Are You Doin' the Rest of Your Life" by Burton Lane and Ted Koehler – sung and danced by Jack Carson and Jane Wyman with Jimmy Dorsey and his Orchestra
3. "The General Jumped at Dawn" by Larry Neal and Jimmy Mundy – sung by Golden Gate Quartet
4. "We're Having a Baby" by Vernon Duke and Harold Adamson – sung by Eddie Cantor and Nora Martin with Jimmy Dorsey and his Orchestra
5. "Tumblin' Tumbleweeds" by Bob Nolan – sung by the Sons of the Pioneers
6. "Don't Fence Me In" by Cole Porter and Robert H. Fletcher – sung by Roy Rogers with the Sons of the Pioneers
7. "Gettin' Corns for My Country" by Jean Barry, Leah Worth, and Dick Charles – sung by the Andrews Sisters with Jimmy Dorsey and his Orchestra
8. "Don't Fence Me In" (reprise) – sung by Roy Rogers and later by the Andrews Sisters with Jimmy Dorsey and his Orchestra
9. "You Can Always Tell a Yank" by Burton Lane and Yip Harburg – sung by Dennis Morgan and Chorus with Jimmy Dorsey and his Orchestra, then sung by Joe E. Brown with Chorus
10. "Sweet Dreams, Sweetheart" by M.K. Jerome and Ted Koehler – sung by Joan Leslie (dubbed by Sally Sweetland) and Chorus
11. "Ballet in Jive" by Ray Heindorf – danced by Joan McCracken and Chorus
12. "The Bee" by François Schubert – played by Joseph Szigeti.
13. "The Souvenir" by František Drdla – played by Joseph Szigeti and Jack Benny
14. "Voodoo Moon" by Obdulio Morales, Julio Blanco, and Marion Sunshine – played by Carmen Cavallaro and his Orchestra
15. "Dance" – danced by Antonio and Rosario
16. "Sweet Dreams, Sweetheart" (reprise) – sung by Kitty Carlisle

== Production ==
Production on the film began in 1943, before being halted due to salary disputes involving the Screen Actors Guild and Warner Bros over the amount major stars would be paid even for brief cameos in the film. Filming locations included the Sunset Strip, Bel-Air Estates, and Veterans Administration Hospital. New recording equipment developed by Warner Bros., including a cueing device, was first used in this film.

== Reception ==
The film received mixed reviews from critics. Variety noted, "There isn't a marquee big enough to hold all the names in this one, so how can it miss? Besides, it's basically solid. It has story, cohesion, and heart." Kate Cameron of the Daily News commented, "It is an elaborate show, but it is presented by author-director Delmar Daves in such a patronizing manner as to make one blush for its complete lack of reserve in singing the praises of Hollywood."

=== Box office ===
Despite some negative reviews, Hollywood Canteen was well received by audiences and became Warner Bros.' most successful release of 1944. The studio donated 40% of ticket sales to the real Hollywood Canteen. According to Warner Bros. records, the movie earned $3,831,000 in the U.S. and $1,621,000 elsewhere.

== Awards and nominations ==
Hollywood Canteen received Academy Award nominations for Best Original Song: "Sweet Dreams, Sweetheart", by M. K. Jerome and Ted Koehler; Scoring of a Musical Picture: Ray Heindorf; and Sound Recording: Nathan Levinson.

== See also ==
- List of American films of 1944
- This Is the Army
- Star Spangled Rhythm
- Private Buckaroo
- Follow the Boys
- Stage Door Canteen
- Thank Your Lucky Stars
- Thousands Cheer
- Cowboy Canteen
- Show Business at War
