= The Hard Way (1943 film) =

1943 film by Vincent Sherman

- Theatrical poster
- Directed by: Vincent Sherman
- Screenplay by: Daniel Fuchs; Peter Viertel
- Story by: Irwin Shaw; Jerry Wald
- Produced by: Jerry Wald
- Starring: Ida Lupino; Dennis Morgan; Joan Leslie
- Cinematography: James Wong Howe
- Edited by: Thomas Pratt
- Music by: Heinz Roemheld
- Distributed by: Warner Bros. Pictures
- Release date: February 20, 1943
- Running time: 109 minutes
- Country: United States
- Language: English
- Box office: $2.3 million (US rentals)

The Hard Way is a 1943 Warner Bros. musical drama film starring Ida Lupino, Dennis Morgan, Joan Leslie, Jack Carson, Gladys George, and Faye Emerson. Directed by Vincent Sherman, it is based on a story by Irwin Shaw which was reportedly based on Ginger Rogers' relationship with her first husband Jack Pepper (whom she married in 1928 at age 17) and her mother Lela.

== Plot ==
Helen Chernen is an ambitious woman, determined to escape poverty in a dirty steel town. She pushes her younger sister Katie into a marriage with singer/dancer Albert Runkel. Katie has no interest in the man, but she is desperate for a better life. Runkel's partner Paul Collins realizes Helen's deeper intentions and tries to stop her from breaking Runkel's heart.

Once risen into wealthier surroundings, Helen tries to make a start on Katie's career. After showcasing her in Runkel's act, she is able to put her in a Broadway production. Katie soon becomes a successful singer and actress, and Collins and Runkel's act flounders. Runkel can't bear being away from his wife on tour and refuses to live off her earnings or even use his wife's name to promote himself. He eventually commits suicide.

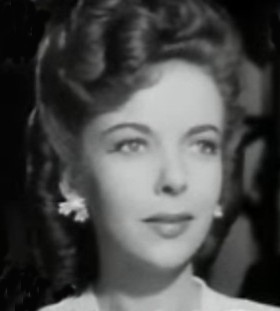
Ida Lupino as Mrs. Helen Chernen

Meanwhile, Katie's popularity goes to her head, and she becomes a wild party girl, losing an important opportunity. She later meets with Paul, who is now a successful band leader. He falls in love with her, and they start a relationship. However, Katie is forced to choose between him and appearing in playwright Laura Britton's play. She chooses the play over Paul, who has asked her to marry him, and he leaves. Before the play, Paul comes to see Katie to wish her luck, but Helen runs him off and the sisters fight over the motivation for Katie's success.

During the play, Katie forgets lines and has to be cued several times before collapsing in the middle of the production. Later that evening, after recovering, Katie tells Helen that she never wants to see her again. Paul appears, and the two profess their love for each other. Helen later dies in what is implied to be a suicide.

== Cast ==
- Ida Lupino as Mrs. Helen Chernen
- Joan Leslie as 'Katie' Blaine
- Dennis Morgan as Paul Collins
- Jack Carson as Albert Runkel
- Gladys George as Lily Emery
- Faye Emerson as Ice Cream Parlor Waitress
- Paul Cavanagh as John "Jack" Shagrue
- Dolores Moran as Young Blonde (uncredited)
- Emory Parnell as Policeman (uncredited)
- Leona Maricle as Laura Britton (uncredited)

== Production ==
Both Bette Davis and Ginger Rogers initially were offered the role of Helen, but both declined. Ida Lupino was cast. Irwin Shaw wanted Howard Hawks or William Wyler to direct the film, but because they were busy with other projects, producer Jerry Wald hired Vincent Sherman.

Portions of a documentary film by Pare Lorentz were used to represent the mining town of Green Hill. To achieve a more realistic feel during the scenes that took place in Green Hill, neither Lupino nor Leslie wore makeup.

The film's first and last scenes were added at Jack L. Warner's insistence, who also demanded that Lupino appear more glamorous in the film's opening.

== Reception ==
In 1992, Halliwell's Film Guide called the picture an "Unconvincing but well mounted drama."

== Soundtrack ==
- "I Love to Dance"
  - (1942) (uncredited)
  - Written by M.K. Jerome and Jack Scholl
  - Played during the opening credits and at the end
  - Sung by Gladys George at rehearsal with piano accompaniment
  - Reprised at a show and sung and danced by Joan Leslie (dubbed by Sally Sweetland) and chorus
  - Sung on a record by Leslie
  - Played as background music often
- "Am I Blue?"
  - (1929) (uncredited)
  - Music by Harry Akst
  - Lyrics by Grant Clarke
  - Sung by Dennis Morgan and Jack Carson in their vaudeville act
  - Reprised by Joan Leslie (dubbed by Sally Sweetland)
  - Played as background music often
- "Tip Toe Through the Tulips with Me"
  - (1929) (uncredited)
  - Music by Joseph Burke
  - Lyrics by Al Dubin
  - Sung by Dennis Morgan and Jack Carson in their vaudeville act
- "You're Getting to Be a Habit with Me"
  - (1932) (uncredited)
  - Music by Harry Warren
  - Lyrics by Al Dubin
  - Played on a juke box in the ice cream parlor
- "For You"
  - (1930) (uncredited)
  - Music by Joseph Burke
  - Lyrics by Al Dubin
  - Played on piano by Dennis Morgan and danced by Joan Leslie
  - Played as background music
- "(You May Not Be an Angel, but) I'll String Along with You"
  - (1934) (uncredited)
  - Music by Harry Warren
  - Lyrics by Al Dubin
  - Sung by Dennis Morgan and Jack Carson at a vaudeville show and danced by Joan Leslie
- "Shuffle Off to Buffalo"
  - (1932) (uncredited)
  - Music by Harry Warren
  - Lyrics by Al Dubin
  - Sung and danced by Jack Carson and Joan Leslie (voice dubbed by Sally Sweetland) at a vaudeville show
  - Played as background music
- "Forty-Second Street"
  - (1932) (uncredited)
  - Music by Harry Warren
  - Lyrics by Al Dubin
  - Played as background music
- "She's a Latin from Manhattan"
  - (1935) (uncredited)
  - Music by Harry Warren
  - Lyrics by Al Dubin
  - Sung and danced by Jack Carson and Joan Leslie (voice dubbed by Sally Sweetland) in a nightclub
- "I Get a Kick Out of You"
  - (1934) (uncredited)
  - Music and lyrics by Cole Porter
  - Played offscreen by the nightclub band
- "Lullaby of Broadway"
  - (1935) (uncredited)
  - Music by Harry Warren
  - Lyrics by Al Dubin
  - Played offscreen by the nightclub band
- "About a Quarter to Nine"
  - (1935) (uncredited)
  - Music by Harry Warren
  - Lyrics by Al Dubin
  - Played on piano and danced by chorus girls at rehearsal
- "Jeepers Creepers"
  - (1938) (uncredited)
  - Music by Harry Warren
  - Lyrics by Johnny Mercer
  - Sung by a chorus at a show
- "My Little Buckaroo"
  - (1937) (uncredited)
  - Music by M.K. Jerome
  - Lyrics by Jack Scholl
  - Sung by a chorus in a montage
- "With Plenty of Money and You"
  - (1936) (uncredited)
  - Music by Harry Warren
  - Lyrics by Al Dubin
  - Song by a chorus in a show during a montage
- "You Must Have Been a Beautiful Baby"
  - (1938) (uncredited)
  - Music by Harry Warren
  - Lyrics by Johnny Mercer
  - Song by a chorus in a show during a montage
- "Begin the Beguine"
  - (1935) (uncredited)
  - Music and lyrics by Cole Porter
  - Played on a record
- "Night and Day"
  - (1932) (uncredited)
  - Music and lyrics by Cole Porter
  - Played by the band at the Embassy Club
- "Goodnight, My Darling"
  - (1942) (uncredited)
  - Written by M.K. Jerome and Jack Scholl
  - Played by the band at the Oakmont Lodge and
  - Sung by Dennis Morgan
- "There's a Small Hotel"
  - (1936) (uncredited)
  - Music by Richard Rodgers
  - Lyrics by Lorenz Hart
  - Played as background music at a theater

== Awards ==
Ida Lupino was awarded a New York Film Critics Circle Award for Best Actress for her role in the film.
