= The Male Animal =

1942 film by Elliott Nugent

- Theatrical release poster
- Directed by: Elliott Nugent
- Screenplay by: Julius J. Epstein; Philip G. Epstein; Stephen Morehouse Avery
- Based on: The Male Animal; 1940 play by James Thurber; Elliott Nugent
- Produced by: Hal B. Wallis (executive producer); Wolfgang Reinhardt (associate producer)
- Starring: Henry Fonda; Olivia de Havilland; Joan Leslie
- Cinematography: Arthur Edeson
- Edited by: Thomas Richards
- Music by: H. Roemheld
- Distributed by: Warner Bros. Pictures
- Release date: April 4, 1942 (U.S.)
- Running time: 101 minutes
- Country: United States
- Language: English
- Box office: $1 million (US rentals)

The Male Animal is a 1942 American comedy-drama film produced by Warner Bros. Pictures, starring Henry Fonda, Olivia de Havilland and Joan Leslie.

The film was based on a hit 1940 Broadway play of the same name written by James Thurber and Elliott Nugent. The screenplay was written by Stephen Morehouse Avery, Julius J. Epstein, and Philip G. Epstein, based on Nugent and Thurber's play. The film was also directed by Elliott Nugent.

== Plot ==
Tommy Turner is an English teacher at football-crazed Midwestern University. Although he is uninvolved with the politics of the day, Tommy suddenly finds himself the center of a free-speech debate on campus. An editorial in a student magazine praises him for planning to read Bartolomeo Vanzetti's sentencing statement to his class as an example of eloquent composition, even in broken English composed by a non-professional.

The school's conservative trustees, led by Ed Keller, threaten to fire Tommy if he doesn't withdraw the reading from his lecture. The subject of free speech and Tommy's dilemma of conscience anchor the dramatic subplot's social significance. The lighter comic triangle plot concerns a return visit to attend the big football game by Joe Ferguson, a former football hero and one-time love interest of Turner's wife Ellen. Joe is recently divorced and he rekindles Ellen's romantic notions at the very moment when her marriage to Tommy is being tested by the events on campus.

== Cast ==
- Henry Fonda as Tommy Turner
- Olivia de Havilland as Ellen Turner
- Joan Leslie as Patricia Stanley
- Jack Carson as Joe Ferguson
- Eugene Pallette as Ed Keller
- Herbert Anderson as Michael Barnes
- Hattie McDaniel as Cleota
- Ivan Simpson as Dean Frederick Damon
- Don DeFore as Wally Myers
- Jean Ames as "Hot Garters" Gardner
- Minna Phillips as Mrs. Blanche Damon
- Regina Wallace as Mrs. Myrtle Keller
- Frank Mayo as Coach Sprague
- William B. Davidson as Alumnus
- Bobby Barnes as Nutsy Miller

== Production ==
Gene Tierney, who had starred as Patricia Stanley in the original Broadway production, was unable to appear in the film because she was contracted to star in John Ford's movie version of Tobacco Road. Don DeFore, another member of the Broadway cast, repeated his role in the film. Co-writer Elliott Nugent played the lead role on the stage before coming to Hollywood to direct Henry Fonda in the film version. Gig Young, who changed his birth name / stage name, Byron Barr, that year, appears unbilled as a student.

Elliott Nugent said the Jack Benny was suggested for the lead. Nugent wrote in his memoirs, "No one admires Jack Benny more than I do, but I felt that any picture treatment for him would necessarily emphasize the lighter side of the play to the detriment of the serious theme about academic freedom. I told Hal Wallis that, under the contract of sale, Thurber and I had no supervision of casting, but that I personally would not have the feel for slanting the story for my friend Benny." He suggested Henry Fonda and Olivia de Havilland instead.

Olivia de Havilland appeared in this film while simultaneously making They Died with Their Boots On (1941) starring Errol Flynn, putting the actress under enormous pressure from overwork.

== Remake ==
The Male Animal was loosely reworked by Warner Bros. as a musical called She's Working Her Way Through College (1952), starring Virginia Mayo and Ronald Reagan. In this adaptation, the characters' names are changed. Also, the political theme is discarded in favor of a conflict surrounding the professor's attempt to mount a musical play featuring a student who is discovered to be a former burlesque dancer.

The remake earned an estimated $2.4 million at the North American box office in 1952.

The remake features Gene Nelson and Phyllis Thaxter in the cast, as well as Don DeFore who had also been in The Male Animal.
