= The Sky's the Limit (1943 film) =

1943 film by Edward H. Griffith

- Film poster
- Directed by: Edward H. Griffith
- Produced by: David Hempstead
- Starring: Fred Astaire; Joan Leslie
- Cinematography: Russell Metty
- Edited by: Roland Gross
- Music by: Leigh Harline (uncredited)
- Distributed by: RKO Radio Pictures
- Release date: September 2, 1943
- Running time: 89 minutes
- Country: United States
- Language: English
- Budget: $871,000
- Box office: $2,185,000

The Sky's The Limit is a 1943 romantic musical comedy film starring Fred Astaire and Joan Leslie, with music by Harold Arlen and lyrics by Johnny Mercer. The film was directed by Edward H. Griffith, and released by RKO Radio Pictures. Astaire plays a Flying Tiger pilot on leave. Robert T. Smith, a real former Flying Tiger pilot on leave before joining the Army Air Forces, was the technical adviser on the film. The comedy is provided by Robert Benchley — his second appearance in an Astaire picture — and Eric Blore, a stalwart from the early Astaire-Rogers pictures.

The film was an unusual departure for Astaire, one which caused some consternation among film critics and fans at the time, though not enough to prevent the film from doing well. Aside from the dancing – which contains the famous solo performance to the standard "One For My Baby (And One More For The Road)", described by Astaire as "the best song specially written for me" – the script provided him with his first opportunity to act in a serious dramatic role, and one with which his acting abilities, sometimes disparaged, appear to cope.

Arlen and Mercer were nominated for the Oscar for Best Original Song, for "My Shining Hour". Leigh Harline was nominated for the Academy Award for Music (Scoring of a Musical Picture).

== Plot ==
During World War II, Flying Tiger triple ace Lieutenant Fred Atwell and his almost-as-successful comrades, Reginald "Reg" Fenton and Richard "Dick" Merlin, are brought back to the United States for a ticker tape parade and a ten-day "leave." The only trouble is, they are expected to spend all their time on a nationwide morale-boosting tour with other military men. Fred sneaks off the train at a rural stop to seek some fun.

He eventually ends up in New York City wearing civilian clothes. He spots a beautiful woman, Joan Manion, entering a nightclub. Eavesdropping, he learns that she is fed up with taking pictures of celebrities for Eyeful Magazine. Her pleas for an assignment in a war zone fall on deaf ears. Her boss, publisher Phil Harriman, likes her just where she is: nearby so he can try to wear her down and persuade her to marry him. Fred is attracted to her and persists in photobombing her work in the club. When she tells him she is supposed to be photographing celebrities, he response is "Couldn't I be the fellow who never gets his name mentioned, the one they call a 'friend,' you know, Ginger Rogers and friend." She half-seriously tells Phil that she regrets giving up the stage, and proceeds to sing "My Shining Hour" for the patrons.

Fred, using the last name "Burton" to hide his identity, romances her in an annoyingly persistent way, even renting the room across the hall from hers. Eventually, she starts to like him, despite what she considers to be a lack of ambition on his part; he does not seem to have or want a job.

She lets him take her on a date, though she takes him into a crowded canteen where she does volunteer work entertaining servicemen. When a performer cancels on short notice, Joan is recruited to sing a number, "A Lot in Common With You." Fred invites himself to sing along and dance with her; in the process, he runs into his friends. While Dick dances with Joan, Reg blackmails Fred into doing a snake dance on the table in exchange for not revealing who he really is.

Joan tries hard to get Fred a job. When she learns that he once worked as a reporter, she arranges an interview with Phil. Reg turns up and informs him that their leave has been cut short; they only have two more days. Fred gives Phil pointers on how to win Joan over, even setting up a romantic dinner at Phil's penthouse with the assistance of his butler, Jackson. Phil blunders badly, gives up and reveals to Joan that she is the one that Fred will never forget. Fred ends up dining with Joan in Phil's penthouse. She tells him she is going to marry him.

Since Fred still does not have a job, Joan takes him along to a banquet honoring airplane manufacturer Harvey J. Sloan. She introduces Fred to Mr. Sloan, but instead of making a good impression as he had promised, he criticizes Sloan's fighter plane's performance. When Joan finds out, she breaks up with him.

Afterward, Phil invites Fred to a nearby bar, where he reveals to Fred that he has found out his true identity. Fred asks him to keep it a secret. Fred gets drunk and singing to bartenders while bar-hopping to "One for My Baby."

The next day, Phil makes one last attempt to get Joan to marry him. When that fails, he sends her to LaGuardia Airport for an assignment, knowing Fred will be there. When she spots Fred in uniform, it all becomes clear to her. The two embrace, and Fred professes his love for Joan before flying off.

== Cast ==
- Fred Astaire as Fred Atwell, also known as Fred Burton
- Joan Leslie as Joan Manion
- Robert Benchley as Phil Harriman
- Robert Ryan as Reginald Fenton
- Elizabeth Patterson as Mrs. Fisher
- Marjorie Gateson as Canteen hostess
- Eric Blore as Jackson, Phil's butler
- Clarence Kolb as Harvey J. Sloan (uncredited)
- Richard Davies as Richard Merlin (uncredited)
- Peter Lawford as officer (uncredited)

== Production ==
The story line was taken from a Saturday Evening Post story about an attractive young woman from Texas who was an assistant/employee/(lover?) of an older man prominent in New York City literary circles. In the story, the young woman leaves her glamorous job to marry a young man who is going off to World War II. This character is altered a good bit to fit Fred Astaire in the movie.

=== Music ===
All dances were choreographed by and credited to Astaire alone, an unusual departure for him, as he generally worked with collaborators. What is not unusual is the selection of dance routines, which is the standard Astaire formula of a comic partnered routine, a romantic partnered routine and a "sock" solo, each of which is integrated into the plot.

- "My Shining Hour" (song): Arlen and Mercer's simple and hymn-like wartime ballad, the picture's signature song, is mimed by Joan Leslie (dubbed here by Sally Sweetland) against the backdrop of a band whose instruments are framed with illuminated neon outlines. It became a hit, albeit slowly.
- "A Lot in Common With You": Astaire muscles in on Leslie's (using her own voice this time) on-stage song-and-dance routine, which develops into a mock competitive comic side-by-side tap dance using a range of leg-before-leg hurdling steps, some of which had been developed for "The Shorty George" number in You Were Never Lovelier, but had not been used. The song also makes reference to recent musicals by Leslie and Astaire by name-dropping both James Cagney and Rita Hayworth, respectively Leslie's partner in Yankee Doodle Dandy from the previous year and Astaire's partner in You'll Never Get Rich from 1941 and the aforementioned You Were Never Lovelier in 1942.
- The tabletop snake dance: Performed by Astaire at the behest of Robert Ryan's character.
- "My Shining Hour" (dance): This is a partnered ballroom-style romantic dance.
- One For My Baby (And One More For The Road)": The number took two and a half days to shoot, after seven days of full set rehearsal. After a drunken rendition of the song, he furiously tap dances up and down the bar, pausing only to smash stacked racks of glasses and a mirror. Astaire's first drunk dance was the comic routine "You're Easy To Dance With" in Holiday Inn, but this solo marks his first clear departure from a carefully crafted screen image of urbane charm. Theater audiences complained about the waste of glass—which was tightly rationed—but the studio had acquired manufacturers' rejects. Normally, safety glass made of sugar would have been used, but sugar was even harder to come by. The use of real glass was also more dangerous, and Astaire received several cuts on this legs.

== Radio ==
On April 4, 1949, Fred Astaire reprised his role as Capt. Jerry Burton on The NBC Theater's “Screen Director's Assignment” radio series. There is no explanation of the name change. Director Edward H. Griffith introduces the program in a pre-recorded announcement, speaking of the then-current nostalgia for the period. See Screen Directors Playhouse and Screen Directors Playhouse (radio series). The program is available in the Internet Archive in a collection of episodes.

== Reception ==
According to RKO records, the film earned $1,410,000 in the U.S. and Canada and $775,000 elsewhere, resulting in a profit of $625,000.

It was released in France in 1945 and recorded admissions of 671,864.

Bosley Crowther gave the film short shrift in his September 3, 1943 review for The New York Times, which opened: "Fred Astaire is a very thin fellow, but why emphasize it in a film so thin that daylight shows all around him—just daylight and Joan Leslie, that's all ... Apparently they are having trouble finding more than dancing partners for Mr. Astaire. They are also having trouble finding stories. He has neither one in this ..."

Michael Phillips reassessed the film in his review for the Chicago Tribune, first published on July 31, 2014 and updated on June 18, 2018: "...a telling and bittersweet artifact of the World War II era, surprisingly clear-eyed about fly-by-night romance (even if it's true love) and the Yanks who flew by night, and day, for real, many of them dying on the job. ...Astaire's atypically cynical character has a clock running and a lot of living to do. When things don't appear to work out ... he lets loose with a startling, rage- and alcohol-fueled tap solo set to the great Harold Arlen/Johnny Mercer lament, "One for My Baby." .., (the score) includes "My Shining Hour," one of the classiest of all wartime ballads, ... The movie manages to fulfill its topical patriotic duties in a way that feels fresh, urgent and honest about its time and place."
