= Repeat Performance =

1947 film by Alfred L. Werker

- Theatrical release poster
- Directed by: Alfred L. Werker
- Screenplay by: Walter Bullock
- Based on: Repeat Performance; 1942 novel by William O'Farrell
- Produced by: Aubrey Schenck
- Starring: Louis Hayward; Joan Leslie; Tom Conway
- Cinematography: L. William O'Connell
- Edited by: Louis Sackin
- Music by: George Antheil
- Color process: Black and white
- Production company: Bryan For Productions
- Distributed by: Eagle-Lion Films
- Release date: May 22, 1947
- Running time: 92 minutes
- Country: United States
- Language: English
- Budget: $600,000 or $1.3 million

Repeat Performance is a 1947 American film noir (with fantasy elements) starring Louis Hayward and Joan Leslie. The film was released by Eagle-Lion Films, directed by Alfred L. Werker, and produced by Aubrey Schenck.

== Plot ==
On New Year's Eve 1946, Sheila Page stands over her dead husband Barney with a gun in her hand. She panics and arrives at a party, requesting two friends for help. There, William suggests she should see theatrical producer John Friday for advice. She arrives at Friday's apartment, and as she ascends the stairs, she wishes that she could live 1946 all over again. William suddenly disappears, and she is transported back to New Year's Day 1946. At Friday's apartment, she decides not to perform in a play Saying Goodbye in London she had played in the future, which baffles Friday.

She returns to her apartment and embraces a live Barney. They invite their friends, including Friday, for a New Year's Day breakfast, where Sheila warns William to avoid Eloise Shaw, who will have him committed to an insane asylum. To Sheila's surprise, English playwright Paula Costello crashes the party and flirts with Barney. He and Sheila argue, in which Barney leaves to go out drinking. Sheila begins to question whether fate really does exist. The next morning, Barney returns home drunk.

Determined to keep Barney from seeing Paula, Sheila travels to California with Barney. There, Barney reads Paula's new play Saying Goodbye, which Sheila remembers performing in the original timeline. However, she refuses to perform in the play and angers Barney, after stating he wastes his time reading other plays and not finishing his own. Friday arrives and convinces her to perform in the play. During rehearsals, Barney arrives with Paula, and Sheila tries to convince Sheila to rewrite the final act.

As the play continues its yearly run in New York, Barney and Paula continue their affair. At a Thanksgiving party at the theatre, Barney gets drunk, insults Sheila, and kisses Paula on the balcony. When they are discovered, Barney falls over the edge and near the railing of the stage. Barney is immobilized from a brain paralysis, and Sheila quits the play to help him recover. Meanwhile, Sheila learns from Eloise that William has been committed to an insane asylum and goes to visit him. Sheila reminds him of her earlier statements about reliving 1946, and advises him he will walk out of the asylum on New Year's Eve.

On Christmas Eve, Sheila reprises her stage role, leaving Barney alone with their housemaid. Paula arrives at their apartment where Barney considers returning with her to London. Sheila arrives home and confronts Paula as she's walking out on Barney. On New Year's Eve, Sheila finishes her performance, and asks Friday to accompany her to the apartment. There, she finds a note from Barney stating he left her for Paula, and that he can walk again with the aid of a cane. Before the ship sails, Barney arrives in Paula's stateroom but she rejects him.

Angered, Barney returns to their apartment and confronts Sheila wanting to kill her. As Barney prepares to strike, he is shot dead from behind by William. The police arrive a moment later and arrest William. He reminds Sheila that they can't do anything to him since he has already been declared mad. As he is being taken into custody, William verbalizes, "Destiny is a stubborn old girl, Sheila. She doesn't like people interfering with her plans, but we tricked her, didn't we? Anyway, I don't think she cares about the pattern as long as the result is the same."

== Cast ==
- Louis Hayward as Barney Page
- Joan Leslie as Sheila Page
- Virginia Field as Paula Costello
- Tom Conway as John Friday
- Richard Basehart as William Williams
- Natalie Schafer as Eloise Shaw
- Benay Venuta as Bess Michaels
- Ilka Grüning as Mattie
- John Ireland as Narrator (uncredited)
- Eric Wilton as Reveler (uncredited)

== Production ==
There were various actors and directors in mind for the film, with Jules Dassin once in mind to direct while Franchot Tone and Constance Dowling were tapped for the lead roles. Eventually, Dowling was dropped for Sylvia Sidney in mind. All of the considerations would instead be scrubbed for Alfred L. Werker to direct for Joan Leslie and Louis Hayward.

The film reversed the original story that involves Barney having been the one killing his lover before he relives the previous year and Sheila being a drunk. This was evidently done due to the perception that Joan Leslie could not play a villain. Also, in the book by William O'Farrell, the Richard Basehart character called William Williams was a cross dressing poet.

Filming began November 1946.

Eagle-Lion, noticing the good reviews for Basehart, gave him higher billing and even gave the film a premiere showing in his home town of Zanesville, Ohio.

== Restoration ==
The film was restored after a screening in 2007 featuring a guest appearance by cast member Joan Leslie resulted in the discovery that a 35mm print had badly decomposed.

The UCLA Film and Television Archive, The Packard Humanities Institute, The Film Noir Foundation, and others then followed with restoration of the film, now available on Blu Ray.

== Remake ==
This film was remade as the television film Turn Back the Clock (1989) directed by Larry Elikann. It featured Connie Sellecca, David Dukes, Jere Burns, Wendy Kilbourne and original cast member Joan Leslie.

== See also ==
- List of films featuring time loops
- List of time travel works of fiction#Film
