= Sally Sweetland =

American soprano singer and teacher (1911–2015)

- Born: Sally Mueller; September 23, 1911; Los Angeles, California, U.S.
- Died: February 8, 2015 (aged 103); Banning, California, U.S.
- Occupations: Singer, educator
- Years active: 1940s–1950s
- Spouse(s): Lee E. Sweetland (October 9, 1916–August 10, 2009) m. 1939–2009; his death
- Children: 4

Sally Sweetland (née Mueller; September 23, 1911 – February 8, 2015) was an American soprano singer and teacher. She was active in the film and recording industry during the 1940s and 50s, before moving into teaching.

== Early life and career ==
Sweetland was born Sally Mueller in Los Angeles on September 23, 1911. In the 1940s, she provided voice dubbing for singing voices in movies, notably for Joan Leslie in several films including Yankee Doodle Dandy (1942) and Rhapsody in Blue (1945), as well as for Brenda Marshall, Martha Vickers and Joan Fontaine in other films of that era. She was featured as a solo artist on television programs such as The Perry Como Show and The Ed Sullivan Show. She was the female soloist on Gaslight Gayeties on NBC Red in the mid-1940s and on Top of the Evening, which debuted in 1944.

In March 1952, Sweetland featured on Perry Como's RCA Victor recording of "Summertime" by George and Ira Gershwin, which was released as a single, and appeared on Como's album TV Favorites. The following month, Sweetland provided backing vocals on two early recording sessions for the young Tony Bennett on Columbia. She also took part in numerous children's records at this time. In 1953, she provided vocals for Eddie Fisher's recording of "I'm Walking Behind You", which reached number one on both the Billboard Top 100 and the UK Singles Chart.

Sweetland later worked as a vocal coach with her husband Lee, a baritone, who was Woody Woodpecker's singing voice on NBC Radio. Among their students was Seth MacFarlane, creator of Family Guy. In 1995, actor George Hearn won the Tony Award for Best Featured Actor in a Musical for his role in Sunset Boulevard. In his acceptance speech, he thanked the Sweetlands.

== Personal life ==
On December 11, 1939, she married Lee E. Sweetland, an actor and fellow singer, becoming known under her married name. The couple had four children, including a son, Steve Sweetland, and a daughter, Judy Horrall. Steve took over their former students, and carried on their work until his death in 2022.

Sweetland was widowed in 2009, after 69 years of marriage. Sweetland celebrated her 100th birthday in 2011, citing laughter as her secret to longevity. As of 2013, she was a resident of Banning, California. She died at her home there, on February 8, 2015, aged 103.

== Soundtrack list (film dubbing) ==
- 1940 – The Sea Hawk ("Old Spanish Song"; dubbed Brenda Marshall)
- 1942 – Yankee Doodle Dandy ("Mary's a Grand Old Name", "Harrigan", and "The Warmest Baby in the Bunch"; dubbed Joan Leslie)
- 1943 – The Hard Way ("Youth Must Have Its Fling", "Shuffle Off to Buffalo", "She's a Latin from Manhattan", and "My Little Buckaroo"; dubbed Joan Leslie)
- 1943 – The Constant Nymph ("Tomorrow"; dubbed Joan Fontaine)
- 1943 – The Sky's the Limit ("My Shining Hour"; dubbed Joan Leslie)
- 1943 – Phantom of the Opera ("Martha" (Act 3, opera excerpt; dubbed Jane Farrar; "Amour et gloire"; dubbed Jane Farrar)
- 1943 – Thank Your Lucky Stars ("I'm Riding for a Fall" and "No You, No Me"; dubbed Joan Leslie)
- 1944 – Hollywood Canteen ("Sweet Dreams, Sweetheart"; dubbed Joan Leslie)
- 1944 – Knickerbocker Holiday ("It Never Was You"; dubbed Constance Dowling)
- 1945 – Where Do We Go from Here? ("If Love Remains", "All at Once" and "Morale"; dubbed Joan Leslie)
- 1945 – Rhapsody in Blue ("Embraceable You", "Swanee", "Smiles", "Somebody Loves Me", and "Delishious"; dubbed Joan Leslie)
- 1946 – The Time, the Place and the Girl ("A Rainy Night in Rio" and "A Gal in Calico"; dubbed Martha Vickers. Also dubbed singing for Florence Bates)
