= Where Do We Go from Here? (1945 film) =

1945 film by Gregory Ratoff

- Theatrical poster
- Directed by: Gregory Ratoff
- Screenplay by: Morrie Ryskind
- Story by: Morrie Ryskind; Sig Herzig
- Produced by: William Perlberg
- Starring: Fred MacMurray; Joan Leslie; June Haver
- Cinematography: Leon Shamroy
- Edited by: J. Watson Webb Jr.
- Music by: Kurt Weill; Ira Gershwin
- Distributed by: Twentieth Century-Fox
- Release date: May 23, 1945
- Running time: 78 minutes
- Country: United States
- Language: English
- Budget: $2.4 million
- Box office: $1.75 million

Kurt Weill and Ira Gershwin sing their songs from the movie musical, Where Do We Go from Here?

Where Do We Go from Here? is a 1945 romantic musical comedy-fantasy film directed by Gregory Ratoff and starring Fred MacMurray, Joan Leslie, June Haver, Gene Sheldon, Anthony Quinn and Fortunio Bonanova. It was produced by Twentieth Century-Fox. Joan Leslie's singing voice was dubbed by Sally Sweetland.

The score was composed by Kurt Weill with lyrics by Ira Gershwin. Gregory Ratoff directed and Morrie Ryskind wrote the screenplay from a story by Sig Herzig and Ryskind.

The film is notable as Weill's only musical written directly for the screen and for its anachronistic blend of history and contemporary (1940s) slang. At the time, the mock-operatic sequence, "The Nina, the Pinta, the Santa Maria," was one of the longest musical sequences ever created for a screen musical.

== Plot ==
Bill Morgan is a young American who is eager to join the military and fight for his country during World War II, but his 4F status prevents him from enlisting. Bill does his bit for the war effort by collecting scrap metal. Among the discarded junk he discovers a mysterious brass bottle which he rubs to clean off the grime.

Suddenly, Ali, a Genie, appears and offers to grant him three wishes. Without thinking, Bill says he wants to be in the US Army. In a puff of smoke, Bill finds himself a foot soldier in George Washington's Continental Army during the American Revolutionary War. After a run-in with some Hessian soldiers, Bill escapes by wishing himself into the Navy. Once again, the Genie transfers him, but this time to the crew of Christopher Columbus's ship on his maiden voyage to the new world. Once on shore, he agrees to buy Manhattan Island from a local native.

Bill next finds himself whisked forward in time to New Amsterdam in the mid-17th century. When he claims that he owns the Island, he is thrown in jail. Ali finally gets it right and Bill finds himself in the right time and place by the end of the film.

== Cast ==
- Fred MacMurray as Bill Morgan
- Joan Leslie as Sally Smith / Prudence / Katrina
- June Haver as Lucilla Powell / Gretchen / Indian
- Gene Sheldon as Ali the Genie
- Anthony Quinn as Chief Badger
- Carlos Ramírez as Benito
- Alan Mowbray as General George Washington
- Fortunio Bonanova as Christopher Columbus
- Herman Bing as Hessian Col. / Von Heisel
- Howard Freeman as Kreiger

== Production ==
Kurt Weill had not been well served by Hollywood. His scores for the Broadway shows Knickerbocker Holiday, Lady in the Dark, and One Touch of Venus had been drastically cut for their film adaptations. Although a few cuts were made in his proposed score for Where Do We Go from Here, most of his work with Ira Gershwin remains, including a lengthy mock-opera bouffé aboard Columbus' ship during which the crew threatens to mutiny.

Co-stars June Haver and Fred MacMurray met while working on this film and were later married.

Where Do We Go from Here? has to date not been released on any traditional home video format. For years the only release was a recording taken directly from the soundtrack of the film, issued on LP (Ariel KWH 10) and a set of rehearsal recordings performed by Kurt Weill and Ira Gershwin is currently available on the CD Tryout (DRG Records) including extended versions of the songs "Nina, the Pinta, the Santa Maria", "Song of the Rhineland", and "Manhattan (Indian Song)."

A Manufactured-on-Demand-DVD was released through the Fox Archive MOD program in 2012.

== Musical numbers ==
- "All at Once" – Sung by Fred MacMurray
- "Morale" – Sung and Danced by June Haver and Chorus
- "If Love Remains" – Sung and Danced by Fred MacMurray, Joan Leslie (dubbed by Sally Sweetland) and Chorus
- "Song of the Rhineland" – Sung and Danced by June Haver, Herman Bing and Chorus
- "Columbus (The Nina, the Pinta, the Santa Maria)" – Sung by Carlos Ramírez, Fred MacMurray, Fortunio Bonanova and Chorus
- "All at Once" (reprise) – Sung by Fred MacMurray and Joan Leslie (dubbed by Sally Sweetland)
- "Morale" (reprise) – Sung by Fred MacMurray, Joan Leslie (dubbed by Sally Sweetland), June Haver, Gene Sheldon and Chorus

== Cut songs ==
- "It Could Have Happened to Anyone"
- "Woo, Woo, Woo, Woo, Manhattan"

== See also ==
- List of films about the American Revolution
- List of television series and miniseries about the American Revolution
