= Jack Carson =

Canadian-American actor (1910–1963)

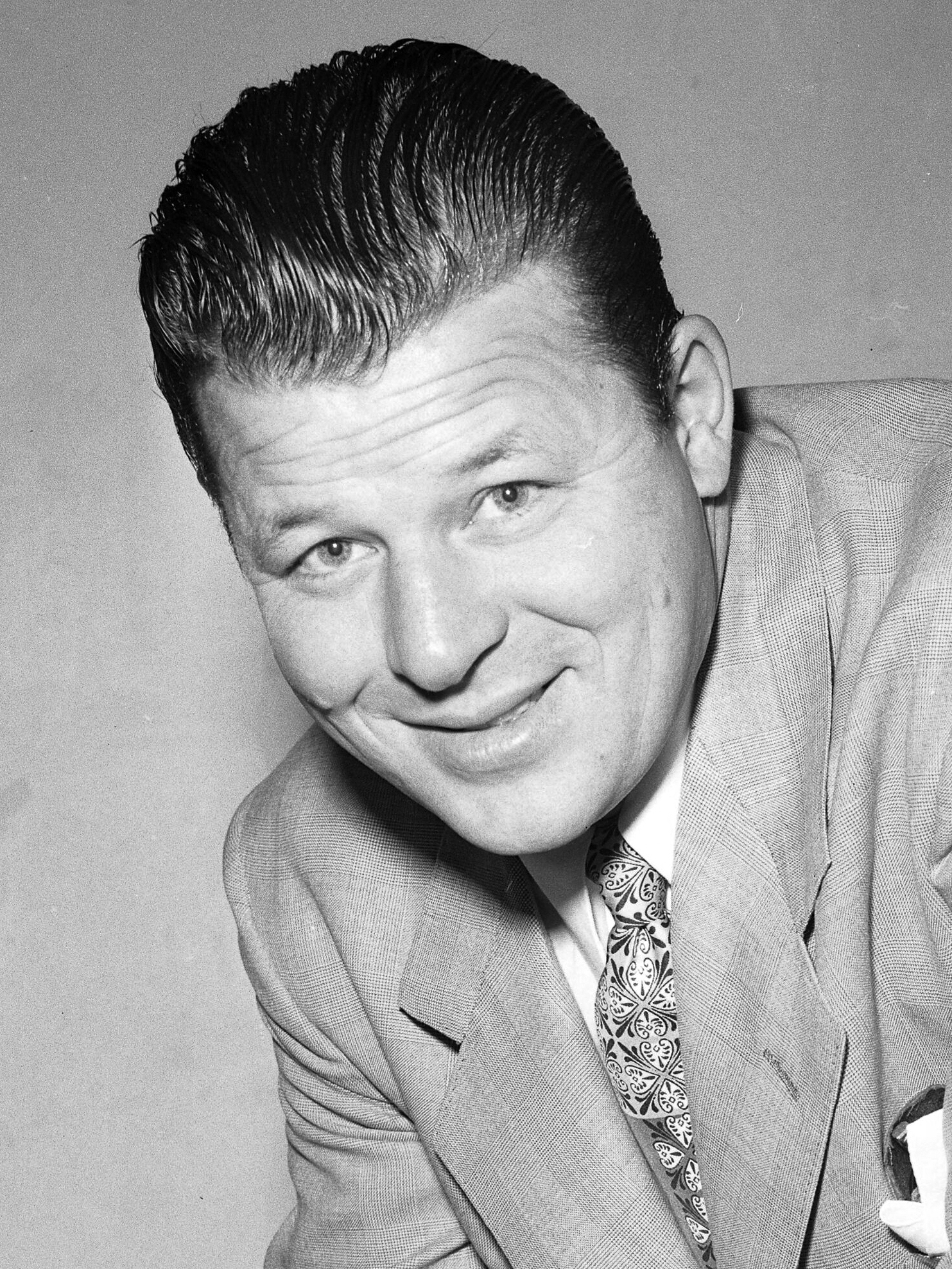
- Carson in 1949
- Born: John Elmer Carson; October 27, 1910; Carman, Manitoba, Canada
- Died: January 2, 1963 (aged 52); Encino, California, U.S.
- Occupation: Actor
- Years active: 1937–1962
- Spouses: Elizabeth Lindy (m. 1938; div. 1939) Kay St. Germain Wells (m. 1941; div. 1950) Lola Albright (m. 1952; div. 1958) Sandra Jolley (m. 1961)
- Children: 2

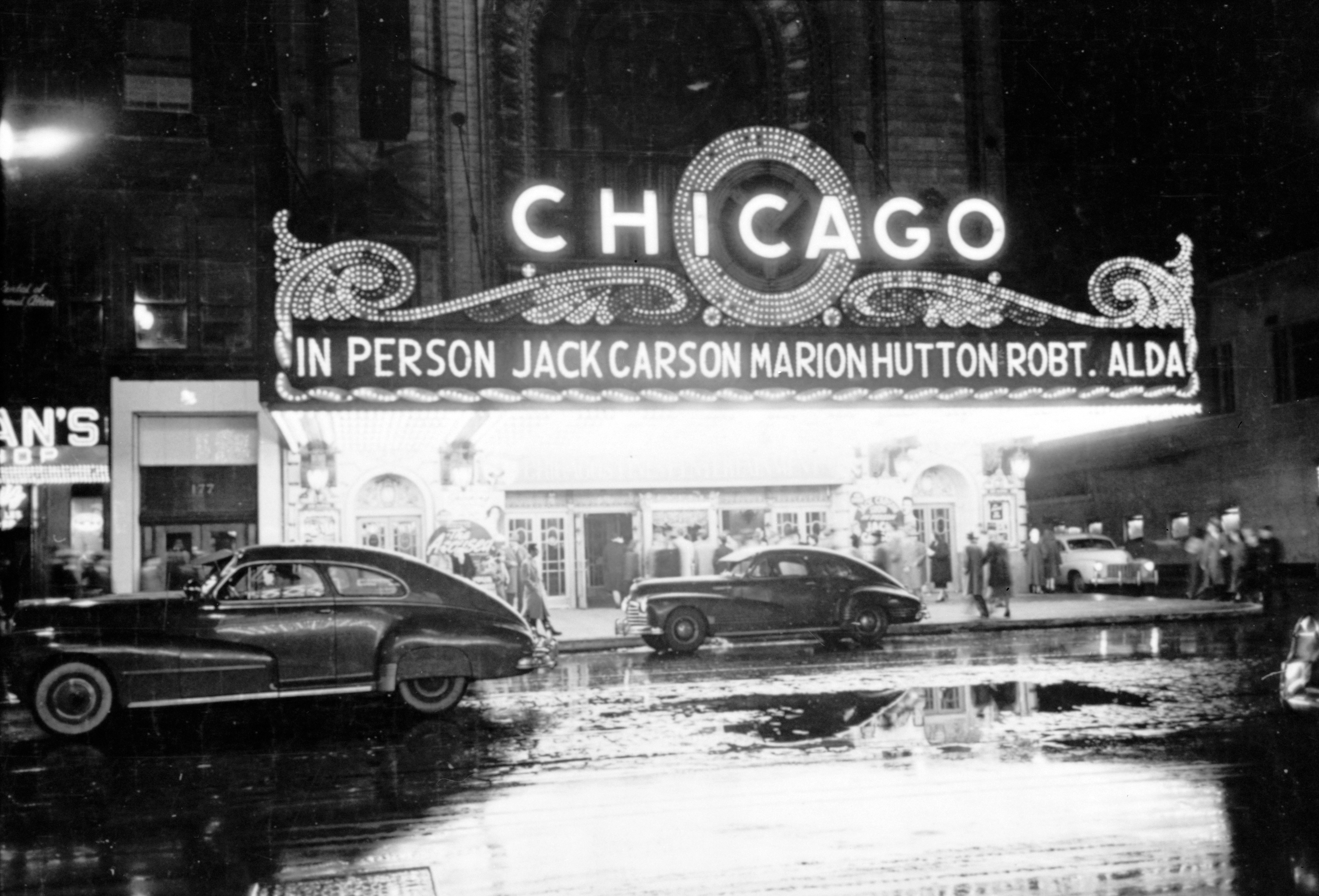
People arriving at the Chicago Theatre, for a show starring, in person, Jack Carson, Marion Hutton, and Robert Alda, taken by Stanley Kubrick for Look magazine, 1949

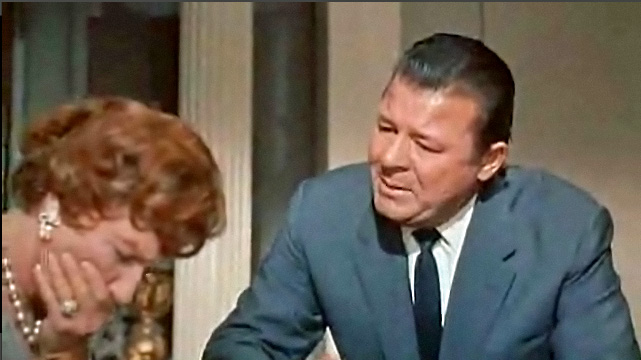
Carson with Judith Anderson in Cat on a Hot Tin Roof (1958)

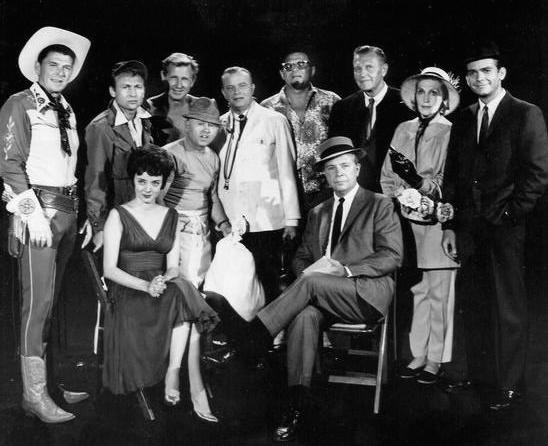
Guest stars for the 1961 premiere episode of The Dick Powell Show, "Who Killed Julie Greer?" Standing, from left: Ronald Reagan, Nick Adams, Lloyd Bridges, Mickey Rooney, Edgar Bergen, Jack Carson, Ralph Bellamy, Kay Thompson, Dean Jones. Seated, from left: Carolyn Jones and Dick Powell.

John Elmer Carson (October 27, 1910 – January 2, 1963), known as Jack Carson, was a Canadian-born American vaudevillian, and radio, fim, and television actor. Carson often played the role of comedic friend in films of the 1940s and 1950s, including The Strawberry Blonde (1941) with James Cagney and Arsenic and Old Lace (1944) with Cary Grant. He appeared in such dramas as Mildred Pierce (1945), A Star Is Born (1954), and Cat on a Hot Tin Roof (1958). He worked for RKO and MGM (where he was cast opposite Myrna Loy and William Powell in Love Crazy, 1941), but most of his notable work was for Warner Bros.

== Early years ==
Carson was born on October 27, 1910, in Carman, Manitoba, to Elsa (née Brunke) and Elmer (Note: The "Jack Carson" section in the book Once Upon a Time in Paradise: Canadians in the Golden Age of Hollywood gives the father's name as "Edward L. Carson".)Carson. He was the younger brother of actor Robert Carson (1909–1979). His father was an executive with an insurance company. In 1914, the family moved to Milwaukee, Wisconsin, which he reportedly regarded as his hometown. He attended high school at Hartford School (Milwaukee) and St. John's Military Academy (Delafield, Wisconsin). At Carleton College (Northfield, Minnesota) he acquired a taste for acting. Carson became a U.S. citizen on June 6, 1949.

== Career ==
=== Vaudeville ===
Because of his size—6 ft 2 in (1.9 m) and 220 lb (100 kg)—Carson's first stage appearance (in a collegiate production) was as Hercules. During a performance, he tripped and took half the set with him. Dave Willock, a college friend, thought it was so funny he persuaded Carson to team with him in a vaudeville act—Willock and Carson—and a new career was born with "a very successful comedy team that played large and small vaudeville theatres everywhere in North America".

After the act with Willock broke up, Carson teamed with dancer Betty Alice Lindy for appearances in theaters on the Orpheum Circuit.

=== Radio ===
Radio was another source of employment for the team of Carson and Lindy, starting with a 1938 appearance on the Kraft Music Hall when Bing Crosby hosted the show. In 1942–1943, he was host of The Camel Comedy Caravan, and in the next season he starred in The New Jack Carson Show, which debuted on June 2, 1943. Charles Foster wrote about the show in Once Upon a Time in Paradise: Canadians in the Golden Age of Hollywood: "It broke audience records regularly during the four years it was on the air. Hollywood's biggest stars ... lined up to do guest spots on the show."

In 1947–1948, he starred in The Sealtest Village Store.

In 1949, as part of the show, Jack Carson's radio program toured, with Jack Carson, Marion Hutton, and Robert Alda. notably, in Chicago, and supporting John Loves Mary in New York City.

=== Film ===
His success in radio led to the start of a lucrative film career. During the 1930s, as vaudeville declined from increased competition from radio and the movies, Willock and Carson sought work in Hollywood. Carson initially landed bit roles at RKO Radio Pictures in films such as Bringing Up Baby (1938), starring Cary Grant and Katharine Hepburn.

An early standout role for Carson was as a mock-drunk, undercover G-Man opposite Richard Cromwell in Universal Pictures's anti-Nazi action drama titled Enemy Agent. This led to contract-player status with Warner Brothers. While there, he was teamed with Dennis Morgan in a number of popular films known as the "Two Guys" movies, supposedly to compete with Paramount's popular Bing Crosby – Bob Hope Road to … pictures.

Most of his work at Warner Brothers was limited to light comedy work with Morgan, and later Doris Day (who in her autobiography gave credit to Carson as one of her early Hollywood mentors). He also did work for Columbia Pictures, starring in a slapstick comedy, The Good Humor Man in 1950, co-starring his future wife, Lola Albright.

Critics generally agree that Carson's best work was in Mildred Pierce (1945), where he played the perpetually scheming Wally Fay opposite Joan Crawford in the title role. Also in 1945, he played the role of Harold Pierson, the second husband of Louise Randall, played by Rosalind Russell, in Roughly Speaking. Another role which won accolades for him was as publicist Matt Libby in A Star is Born (1954). One of his later film roles was as Cooper "Gooper" Pollitt in Cat on a Hot Tin Roof (1958).

=== Television ===
From 1950 to 1951, Carson was one of four alternating weekly hosts of the comedy-variety show Four Star Revue. (The others were veterans Jimmy Durante and Ed Wynn, and up-and-coming young Danny Thomas.) The second season was his last with the show, when it was renamed All Star Revue.

Carson had his own variety program, The Jack Carson Show, from 1954 to 1955, and was the announcer on the television version of Strike It Rich.

His TV appearances, extending into the early 1960s, included The Jane Wyman Show in 1955; The Guy Mitchell Show, and The Polly Bergen Show in 1957; Alcoa Theatre and Bonanza (Season 1, Ep.9: "Mr. Henry Comstock") in 1959; Thriller ("The Big Blackout") in 1960; The Twilight Zone (Season 2, Ep. 14: "The Whole Truth") in 1961; and in perhaps his last TV appearance, Alfred Hitchcock Presents (Season 7, Ep. 35: "The Children of Alda Nuova") on June 5, 1962.

His TV pilot, Kentucky Kid, was under consideration as a potential series for NBC, but was shelved when Carson became ill with stomach cancer. Carson would have played a veterinarian who raises horses and who has an adopted Chinese child. The series was revived by NBC as Kentucky Jones starring Dennis Weaver in the Carson role.

== Personal life ==
Carson and Elizabeth Lindy married in 1938 and divorced in 1939. He was married to Kay St. Germain from 1941 to 1950. He and Lola Albright were married from 1952 to 1958. Carson was married from 1961 until his death to Sandra Jolley, former wife of actor Forrest Tucker and daughter of actor I. Stanford Jolley. Carson had a romantic relationship with Doris Day in 1950–51, but she left him for Marty Melcher, who became her third husband.

On August 26, 1962, while rehearsing the play Critic's Choice in Andover, New Jersey, Carson collapsed on stage. An early diagnosis deemed it a stomach disorder, but two months later, stomach cancer was discovered while he was undergoing an unrelated operation. He died in Encino, California, on January 2, 1963, at the age of 52. Dick Powell, whom Carson had known for years, died (aged 58) on the same date, also from cancer. Carson was entombed in Forest Lawn Memorial Park, Glendale, California.

Carson's elder brother, Robert Carson, was also a character actor.

== Legacy ==
On February 8, 1960, Carson received two stars on the Hollywood Walk of Fame for his contributions to the television and radio industry. The television star is located at 1560 Vine Street, the radio star at 6361 Hollywood Boulevard.

In 1983, Carson was posthumously inducted into the Wisconsin Performing Artists Hall of Fame along with Dennis Morgan.

== Selected filmography ==
- You Only Live Once (1937) (with Henry Fonda) – Attendant in First Gas Station (uncredited)
- Too Many Wives (1937) (with Anne Shirley) – Hodges
- It Could Happen to You (1937) – Truck Driver (uncredited)
- On Again-Off Again (1937) – Cop (uncredited)
- Reported Missing (1937) – Logantown Airport Radioman (uncredited)
- Music for Madame (1937) – Assistant Director
- Stage Door (1937) (with Katharine Hepburn, Ginger Rogers and Lucille Ball) – Mr. Milbanks
- Stand-In (1937) – Tom Potts
- A Damsel in Distress (1937) – Bit Role (uncredited)
- High Flyers (1937) (with Bert Wheeler, Robert Woolsey, and Lupe Vélez) – Dave Hanlon
- Quick Money (1937) – Coach Woodford
- She's Got Everything (1937) – Ransome (uncredited)
- Crashing Hollywood (1938) – Dickson
- Everybody's Doing It (1938) – Detective Lieutenant (uncredited)
- Bringing Up Baby (1938) (with Katharine Hepburn and Cary Grant) – Circus Roustabout (uncredited)
- Night Spot (1938) – Shallen
- Maid's Night Out (1938) – Rollercoaster Ride Attendant (uncredited)
- Condemned Women (1938) – Plainclothes Policeman (uncredited)
- This Marriage Business (1938) – 'Candid' Perry
- Go Chase Yourself (1938) – Warren Miles
- Law of the Underworld (1938) – Johnny
- Vivacious Lady (1938) (with Ginger Rogers and James Stewart) – Charlie, Waiter Captain
- The Saint in New York (1938) (with Louis Hayward as Simon Templar) – Red Jenks
- Having Wonderful Time (1938) – Emil Beatty
- Carefree (1938) (with Fred Astaire and Ginger Rogers) – Connors
- Mr. Doodle Kicks Off (1938) – Football Player Rochet
- The Kid from Texas (1939) (with Dennis O'Keefe and Buddy Ebsen) – Stanley Brown
- Fifth Avenue Girl (1939) (with Ginger Rogers) – Minnesota, a Sailor (uncredited)
- The Escape (1939) – Chet Warren
- Mr. Smith Goes to Washington (1939) (with James Stewart) – Sweeney Farrell, Newsman (uncredited)
- Legion of Lost Flyers (1939) (with Richard Arlen and Andy Devine) – Larry Barrigan
- Destry Rides Again (1939) (with Marlene Dietrich and James Stewart) – Jack Tyndall
- The Honeymoon's Over (1939) – Tom Donroy
- City of Chance (1940) – Narration – Prologue (voice, uncredited)
- Parole Fixer (1940) (with William Henry) – George Mattison
- I Take This Woman (1940) (with Spencer Tracy and Hedy Lamarr) – Joe
- Young as You Feel (1940) – Norcross
- Shooting High (1940) – Gabby Cross
- Enemy Agent (1940) (with Richard Cromwell) – Ralph
- Typhoon (1940) (with Dorothy Lamour and Robert Preston) – Mate
- Alias the Deacon (1940) – Sullivan
- Girl in 313 (1940) – Police Lieutenant Pat O'Farrell
- Queen of the Mob (1940) (with Ralph Bellamy) – FBI Agent Ross Waring
- Lucky Partners (1940) (with Ronald Colman, Ginger Rogers, Spring Byington and Harry Davenport) – Freddie
- Sandy Gets Her Man (1940) – Policeman Tom Garrity
- Love Thy Neighbor (1940) – Policeman
- Mr. & Mrs. Smith (1941) (with Carole Lombard and Robert Montgomery) – Chuck Benson
- The Strawberry Blonde (1941) (with James Cagney and Olivia de Havilland) – Hugo Barnstead
- Love Crazy (1941) (with William Powell and Myrna Loy) – Ward Willoughby
- The Bride Came C.O.D. (1941) (with James Cagney and Bette Davis) – Allen Brice
- Navy Blues (1941) (with Ann Sheridan) – 'Buttons' Johnson
- Blues in the Night (1941) – Leo Powell
- The Male Animal (1942) (with Henry Fonda and Olivia de Havilland) – Joe Ferguson
- Larceny, Inc. (1942) (with Edward G. Robinson and Jane Wyman) – Jeff Randolph
- Wings for the Eagle (1942) (with Ann Sheridan) – Brad Maple
- Gentleman Jim (1942) (with Errol Flynn, Alan Hale, William Frawley and Ward Bond) – Walter Lowrie
- The Hard Way (1943) (with Ida Lupino) – Albert Runkel
- Thank Your Lucky Stars (1943) (with Bette Davis, Errol Flynn, Ida Lupino and Olivia de Havilland) – Himself
- Princess O'Rourke (1943) (with Olivia de Havilland, Robert Cummings and Charles Coburn) – Dave Campbell
- Shine On, Harvest Moon (1944) (with Ann Sheridan) – The Great Georgetti
- Make Your Own Bed (1944) (with Jane Wyman and Alan Hale) – Jerry Curtis
- The Doughgirls (1944) (with Ann Sheridan and Alexis Smith) – Arthur Halstead
- Arsenic and Old Lace (1944) (with Cary Grant and Priscilla Lane) – Officer Patrick O'Hara
- Hollywood Canteen (1944) – Himself
- Roughly Speaking (1945) (with Rosalind Russell) – Harold C. Pierson
- Mildred Pierce (1945) (with Joan Crawford, Ann Blyth and Eve Arden) – Wally Fay
- One More Tomorrow (1946) (with Ann Sheridan and Jane Wyman) – Patrick 'Pat' Regan
- Two Guys from Milwaukee (1946) (with Dennis Morgan) – Buzz Williams
- The Time, the Place and the Girl (1946) (with Dennis Morgan and Janis Paige) – Jeff Howard
- Love and Learn (1947) (with Martha Vickers) – Jingles Collins
- April Showers (1948) (with Ann Sothern) – Joe Tyme
- Romance on the High Seas (1948) (with Janis Paige, Don DeFore, and Doris Day) – Peter Virgil
- Two Guys from Texas (1948) (with Dennis Morgan, Dorothy Malone and Bugs Bunny) – Danny Foster
- John Loves Mary (1949) (with Ronald Reagan, Wayne Morris and Edward Arnold) – Fred Taylor
- My Dream Is Yours (1949) (with Doris Day and Bugs Bunny) – Doug Blake
- It's a Great Feeling (1949) (with Doris Day) – Himself
- The Good Humor Man (1950) (with George Reeves and Lola Albright) – Biff Jones
- Bright Leaf (1950) (with Gary Cooper and Lauren Bacall) – Chris Malley / Dr. Monaco
- Mr. Universe (1951) (with Vince Edwards) – Jeff Clayton
- The Groom Wore Spurs (1951) (with Ginger Rogers) – Ben Castle
- Dangerous When Wet (1953) (with Esther Williams and Fernando Lamas) – Windy Weebe
- Red Garters (1954) (with Rosemary Clooney) – Jason Carberry
- A Star Is Born (1954) (with Judy Garland and James Mason) – Matt Libby
- Phffft (1954) (with Judy Holliday, Jack Lemmon, and Kim Novak) – Charlie Nelson
- Ain't Misbehavin' (1955) (with Rory Calhoun) – Hal North
- The Bottom of the Bottle (1956) (with Van Johnson and Joseph Cotten) – Hal Breckinridge
- Magnificent Roughnecks (1956) (with Mickey Rooney) – Bix Decker
- The Tattered Dress (1957) (with Jeff Chandler, Jeanne Crain, Gail Russell) – Sheriff Nick Hoak
- The Tarnished Angels (1957) (with Rock Hudson, Robert Stack, and Dorothy Malone) – Jiggs
- Cat on a Hot Tin Roof (1958) (with Elizabeth Taylor, Paul Newman, and Burl Ives) – Gooper Pollitt
- Rally Round the Flag, Boys! (1958) (with Paul Newman, Joanne Woodward, and Joan Collins) – Captain Hoxie
- The Bramble Bush (1960) (with Richard Burton) – Bert Mosley
- New Comedy Showcase (1960) (Season 1 Episode 2: "Johnny Come Lately") - Johnny Martin
- The Big Bankroll (1961) (with David Janssen) – Timothy W. 'Big Tim' O'Brien
- Alfred Hitchcock Presents (1962) (Season 7 Episode 35: "The Children of Alda Nuova") - Frankie Fane
- Sammy the Way Out Seal (1962, episode of anthology TV series Walt Disney's Wonderful World of Color) (with Robert Culp and Billy Mumy) – Harold Sylvester

== Radio appearances ==
Year	Program	Episode/source
1940	The Lux Radio Theatre	His Girl Friday
1943–1947	The Jack Carson Show	
1946	Suspense	Easy Money
1946	The George Burns and Gracie Allen Show	Guest Jack Carson
1959	Suspense	Analytical Hour
