= Thank Your Lucky Stars (film) =

1943 film by David Butler

- Theatrical release poster
- Directed by: David Butler
- Screenplay by: Norman Panama; Melvin Frank; James V. Kern
- Story by: Everett Freeman; Arthur Schwartz
- Produced by: Mark Hellinger
- Starring: Eddie Cantor; Joan Leslie; Dennis Morgan; Dinah Shore
- Cinematography: Arthur Edeson
- Edited by: Irene Morra
- Music by: Heinz Roemheld
- Production company: Warner Bros. Pictures
- Distributed by: Warner Bros. Pictures
- Release date: September 25, 1943
- Running time: 127 minutes
- Country: United States
- Language: English
- Budget: $1.5 million
- Box office: $3.6 million $2.8 million (US rentals)

Thank Your Lucky Stars is a 1943 American musical comedy film made by Warner Bros. Pictures as a World War II fundraiser, with a slim plot involving theater producers. The stars donated their salaries to the Hollywood Canteen, which was founded by John Garfield and Bette Davis, who appear in this film. It was directed by David Butler and stars Eddie Cantor, Dennis Morgan, Joan Leslie, Edward Everett Horton and S.Z. Sakall.

== Plot ==
Two theater producers try to stage a wartime charity extravaganza called Cavalcade of Stars. The egotistical Eddie Cantor has Dinah Shore under contract and will only allow her to appear if he is made chairman of the benefit committee, so he is allowed to take command. Meanwhile, an aspiring singer and his songwriter girlfriend conspire to get into the charity program by replacing Cantor with their lookalike friend, tour bus driver Joe Simpson.

Many of Warner Bros.' stars performed in musical numbers, including several who were not known as singers. The show features the only onscreen musical performances by Bette Davis, Errol Flynn, and Olivia de Havilland.

== Cast ==
- Eddie Cantor as himself/Joe Simpson
- Joan Leslie as Pat Dixon
- Dennis Morgan as Tommy Randolph
- Edward Everett Horton as Farnsworth
- S.Z. Sakall as Dr. Schlenna
- Mike Mazurki as Olaf
- Noble Johnson as Charlie, the Indian (uncredited)
- Ruth Donnelly as Nurse Hamilton
- Ralph Dunn as Marty
- Paul Harvey as Dr. Kirby

Guest Stars

- Willie Best
- Humphrey Bogart
- Jess Lee Brooks
- Jack Carson
- Ben Corbett
- Bette Davis
- William Desmond
- Olivia de Havilland
- Errol Flynn
- John Garfield
- Alan Hale Sr.
- Mark Hellinger
- Ida Lupino
- Hattie McDaniel
- Ann Sheridan
- Dinah Shore
- Alexis Smith
- Madame Sul-Te-Wan
- George Tobias
- Doodles Weaver
- Don Wilson as radio announcer
- Spike Jones and His City Slickers

== Musical numbers ==
Some are performed as part of the plot and others are heard in rehearsal and benefit performance scenes.

- "Thank Your Lucky Stars", sung by Dinah Shore on Eddie Cantor's radio show.
- "My Mama Done Tol' Me" (better known as "Blues in the Night"), sung by John Garfield on Cantor's radio show.
- "Now's the Time to Fall in Love", sung by Cantor on his radio show.
- "Hotcha Cornia", a hot and wild version of "Otchi Chernye" ("Dark Eyes"), performed by Spike Jones & His City Slickers for their fellow residents in Gower Gulch. (Note: In the film, the fictional “Gower Gulch” is a hilltop neighborhood in Los Angeles, where struggling actors and musicians live in caravans and cottages cobbled together from movie sets and gathered around an old house. It is located “only 4 minutes from Vine Street,” according to Tommy Randolph. The Hollywoodland sign blinks in the background on its distant hill. The “real” Gower Gulch was a name given to the intersection of Sunset Boulevard and Gower Street in Hollywood near several studios, including the what is today the Sunset Gower Studios (then Columbia Pictures).)
- "I'm Riding for a Fall", sung by Dennis Morgan and Joan Leslie (dubbed by Sally Sweetland), with Spike Jones and his band.
- "We're Staying Home Tonight...Doing the Patriotic Thing", sung by Eddie Cantor to a captive audience of his household staff and the hapless producers of the benefit.
- "I'm Goin' North", sung by Jack Carson and Alan Hale Sr. as old-time vaudevillians meeting in a train station; both are bucking the trend toward all things Southern. After several costume changes, they end up in a blizzard, dripping with icicles.
- "Love Isn't Born, It's Made", sung by Ann Sheridan with Joyce Reynolds and a chorus of girls in a sorority bedroom.
- "No You, No Me", sung by Dennis Morgan and Joan Leslie (dubbed by Sally Sweetland) from a tableside jukebox in a café.
- "The Dreamer", sung by Dinah Shore as a farm girl singing to her love; she wants to dream "until you're home once more."
- "Ice Cold Katie... Won't You Marry the Soldier?", a big production number performed on a Harlem set by Hattie McDaniel, Willie Best, Jess Lee Brooks and—portraying the song's titular bride-to-be—dancer Rita Christian, plus a chorus of singers and dancers.
- "How Sweet You Are", sung by Dinah Shore with a large chorus of waltzing couples saying farewell as the men go off to war—in 1861.
- "That's What You Jolly Well Get", sung and danced to by Errol Flynn as a mustachioed Cockney seaman boasting to a pub full of cronies about his battles with the Nazis over the past four years.
- "They're Either Too Young or Too Old", sung by Bette Davis in a nightclub set populated by men whose appearances fit the song. A brief and strenuous jitterbug performance by Davis and real-life dance contest winner Conrad Wiedell sends her out to her car. At the end of the number, she replaces the last phrase by blowing a kiss to the audience. The song was written by Frank Loesser and Arthur Schwartz.
- "The Dreamer", a jazzed-up reprise sung by Olivia de Havilland (dubbed by Lynn Martin), Ida Lupino and George Tobias singing scat and costumed as jitterbugging teens; Tobias wears a toned-down zoot suit.
- "Good Night, Good Neighbor", a romantic take on the Good Neighbor Policy, opens with Dennis Morgan escorting Miss Latin America (Lynne Baggett) home to the Pan American Club for Women, singing to her and a chorus of residents. The scene segues to the elegant Club Chiquita, where Alexis Smith dances with Igor Dega and Arnold Kent. Cast members included:
  - Esperanza Dominquez, daughter of Maximiliano Hernandez Martinez who was President of El Salvador at that time.
  - Iris Flores, the granddaughter of the former President of Costa Rica, Rafael Yglesias Castro, and the great-granddaughter of José María Castro Madriz.
  - Maruca Sacasa, daughter of Dr. Juan B. Sacasa who was the former President of Nicaragua and the former ambassador from that country to the United States.
- The finale medley of "Cavalcade of Stars", on a celestial set, with brief reprises or revisions of:
  - "We're Staying Home Tonight" (Cantor as Joe Simpson pretending to be Cantor)
  - "How Sweet You Are" (Chorus girls on clouds)
  - "We're Way Up North..." (Carson and Hale Sr., in a star)
  - "The Dreamer" (Shore, on stage, dreamily; de Havilland, Lupino and Tobias in a star)
  - "Ridin' for a Fall" (Morgan and Leslie)
  - "Love Isn't Born (It's Made)" (Sheridan, in a star)
  - "That's What You Jolly Well Get", as opera. Flynn, without his mustache, interrupts to comment "That voice is so divine, I wish that voice were mine!" and resumes singing in his star.
  - "Good Night, Good Neighbor" (Morgan), while Smith and her partners dance on a cloud in the background.
  - "They're Either Too Young or Too Old" (Davis, in a star)
  - "Ice Cold Katie" (McDaniel, enthroned on a crescent moon and Cantor, rowing by on a cloud)
  - "Thank Your Lucky Stars" (ensemble)
  - The penultimate shots in the film show Sakall, who is conducting the orchestra, driven to distraction by imagining Cantor playing every instrument in the orchestra.

== Production ==
Filming for Thank Your Lucky Stars began on October 14, 1942. Producer Mark Hellinger and director David Butler both made cameo appearances in the film. Thank Your Lucky Stars was the film debut of both Dinah Shore and Spike Jones and his City Slickers. Each of the cast members was paid a $50,000 fee, which was then donated to the Hollywood Canteen.

The film used sets that had been built for the Warner Bros. films The Green Pastures and Wonder Bar.

Bette Davis recalled that Conrad Wiedell, who had really won a jitterbug contest, was frightened at the thought of hurting her. She told him "forget about who I am...let your instincts come to the fore, and just do it!"

Olivia de Havilland said that she added the over-the-top gum chewing to the act in order to help with the lip-synching.

The finale was filmed with many of the cast on stage together, but all are shown when the curtain comes down, thanks to special effects that place five acts—Flynn, Sheridan, Davis, the Carson-Hale duo and the trio of de Havilland, Lupino and Tobias—over their glitter-covered stars.

== Reception ==
Thank Your Lucky Stars was popular with audiences, and the critic James Agee called it "the loudest and most vulgar of the current musicals. It is also the most fun." Ticket sales, combined with the donated salaries of the performers, raised more than $2,000,000 for the Hollywood Canteen.

The film earned $2,503,000 domestically and $1,118,000 in foreign markets.

At the time, Variety described the film as a "triumph for Eddie Cantor". Bosley Crowther of The New York Times wrote that "the gag that the true Mr. Cantor would, if he could, gum up the show is so realistically repeated that fiction becomes painful fact...you have a conventional all-star show which has the suspicious flavor of an 'amateur night' at the studio. But at least it is lively and genial...For the sake of variety, the Warners might have worked in a little more dance and a little more femininity. Too many people sing. And too few beautiful girls display their talents. It is also too much (two hours) of a show. But, in straight omnibus entertainment that's what you have to expect."

Leonard Maltin gives the picture three out of four stars, stating "Very lame plot...frames all-star Warner Bros. show, with Davis singing "They're Either Too Young or Too Old,'' Flynn delightfully performing "That's What You Jolly Well Get,'' other staid stars breaking loose."

== Awards and honors ==
The song "They're Either Too Young or Too Old" by Arthur Schwartz (music) and Frank Loesser (lyrics) was nominated for an Academy Award for Best Music, Original Song, but lost to "You'll Never Know" by Harry Warren and Mack Gordon from the film Hello, Frisco, Hello. The song was also a number-one hit on Your Hit Parade.

== Bibliography ==
- Ringgold, Gene and Quirl, Lawrence J. (1966) The Films of Bette Davis. New York: Cadillac Publishing Co. ISBN 978-0-8065-1177-1.
- Spada, James (1993) More Than a Woman. Boston: Little, Brown and Company. ISBN 978-0-7515-0940-3.
