= Joan Leslie =

American actress (1925–2015)

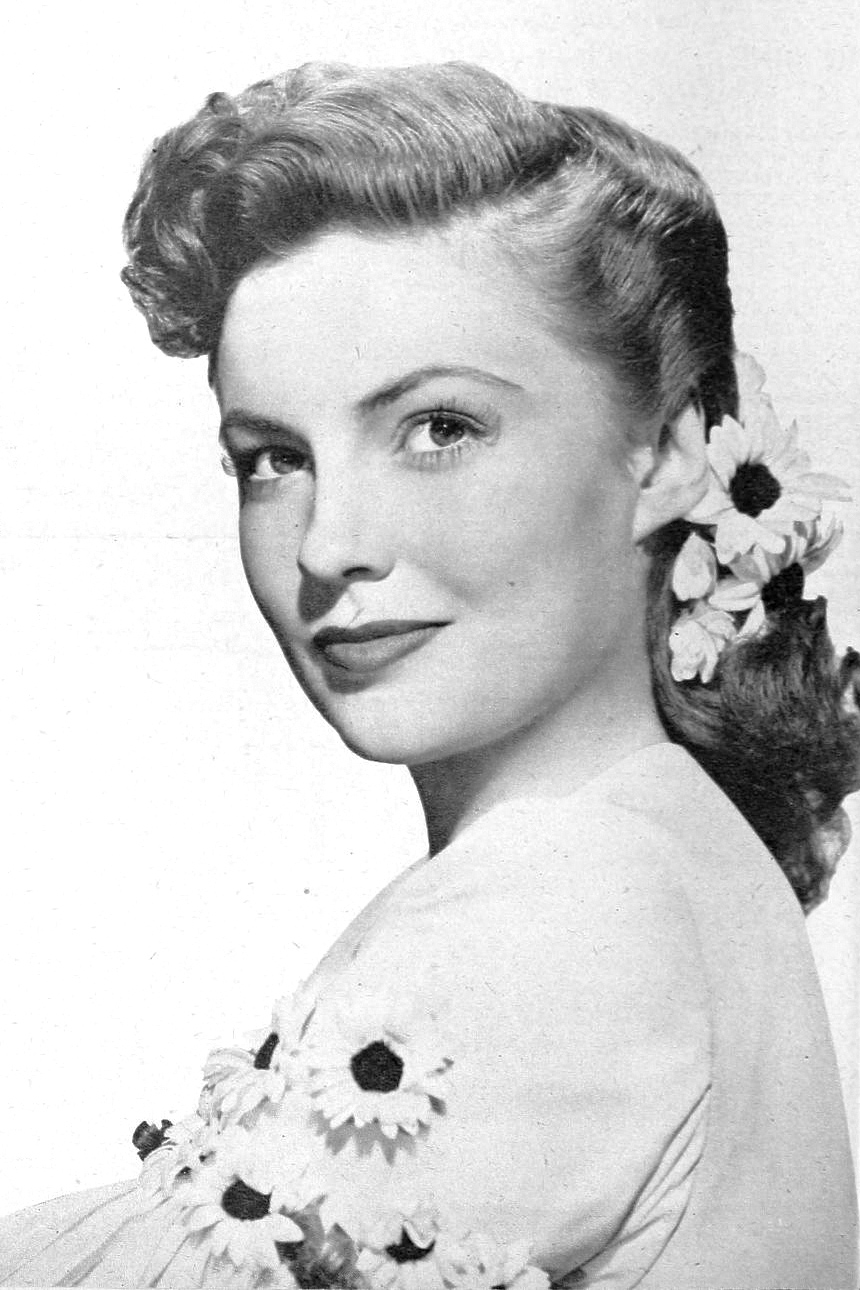
- Leslie in Too Young to Know (1945)
- Born: Joan Agnes Theresa Sadie Brodel; January 26, 1925; Detroit, Michigan, U.S.
- Died: October 12, 2015 (aged 90); Los Angeles, California, U.S.
- Occupations: Actress, vaudevillian
- Years active: 1934–1991
- Known for: High Sierra; Sergeant York; Yankee Doodle Dandy
- Spouse: William G. Caldwell (m. 1950; died 2000)
- Children: 2
- Relatives: Betty Brodel (sister)
- Awards: Golden Boot Awards; 2006 Lifetime Achievement; Hollywood Walk of Fame

Joan Leslie (born Joan Agnes Theresa Sadie Brodel; January 26, 1925 – October 12, 2015) was an American actress and vaudevillian, who during the Hollywood Golden Age, appeared in films such as High Sierra (1941), Sergeant York (1941) and Yankee Doodle Dandy (1942).

== Early life ==
Leslie was born Joan Agnes Theresa Sadie Brodel, the youngest child in her family. Her father was a bank clerk.

Joan's two older sisters, Betty and Mary Brodel, shared their mother's musical interest and started to learn how to play instruments, such as the saxophone and the banjo, at an early age. They began performing in front of audiences in acts that included singing and dancing. Leslie joined the duo at two and a half years of age. She was soon able to play the accordion.

With their father losing his job in the mid-1930s, the Great Depression caused financial difficulties for the family. As a result, the three sisters entered show business as vaudeville performers to support the family. They began touring in Canada and the United States. Collectively, they were known as The Three Brodels. In an attempt to bypass child-labor laws at the time, both Mary and Joan pretended to be older than they were. When Leslie was nine, she told child-labor investigators that she was 16 years old. Joan proved to be the scene stealer of the three sisters because of her impersonations of figures such as Katharine Hepburn, Maurice Chevalier, and Jimmy Durante. Coming from a family of Irish ancestry, Leslie was raised as a Roman Catholic and attended Catholic schools in Detroit, Toronto, and Montreal.

== Early Hollywood career ==
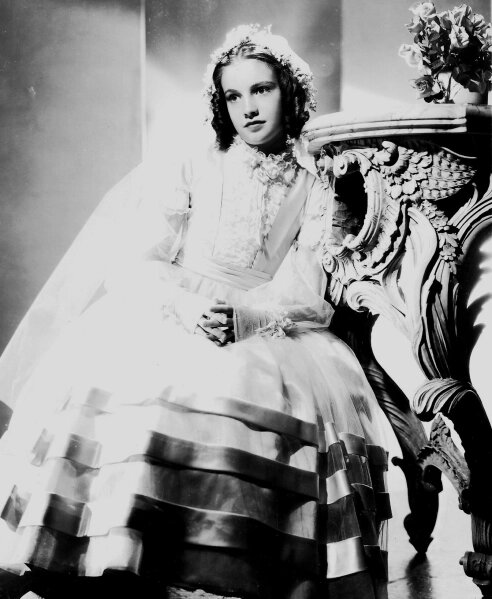
11-year-old Leslie in Camille (1936)

In 1936, 11-year-old Leslie caught the attention of a talent scout from Metro-Goldwyn-Mayer (MGM) when the three Brodel sisters were performing in New York. She was given a six-month contract with the studio, earning $200 per week. While working at the studio, she attended MGM's Little Red Schoolhouse with other child actors such as Judy Garland, Mickey Rooney, and Freddie Bartholomew.

Her first film role was in Camille (1936), a romantic drama starring Greta Garbo and Robert Taylor. She played Taylor's younger sister Marie Jeanette, but her speaking scenes were deleted and she was uncredited. MGM had trouble finding suitable roles for her, and she was let go by the studio along with Deanna Durbin. Leslie returned to New York, working on the radio and as a model. During this time, her older sister Mary was signed to Universal Studios. Leslie returned to Hollywood with the rest of her family, working for different studios as a freelancer. She mainly worked for RKO Pictures.

Leslie was selected to play a small role in Men with Wings (1938). While shooting the film, director William A. Wellman discovered that Leslie's mother had lied about her daughter's age and that she was only 13 years old. For the remainder of the filming schedule, Wellman replaced her with Mary.

Leslie gained her first credited role in Winter Carnival (1939) as Betsy Phillips. She was chosen for the part because the director was searching for an actress with a southern accent. She was billed as Joan Brodel. Later that year, she co-starred with Jimmy Lydon in Two Thoroughbreds, in which she played the daughter of a horse owner.

At age 15, Leslie was selected by a group of Hollywood directors as one of 13 "baby stars of 1940". That same year, she appeared in the Warner Bros. film short, Alice in Movieland, about a starlet trying to make her mark in Hollywood. One of the first films directed by Jean Negulesco in Hollywood, it was based on a story by Ed Sullivan.

== Success at Warner Bros. ==
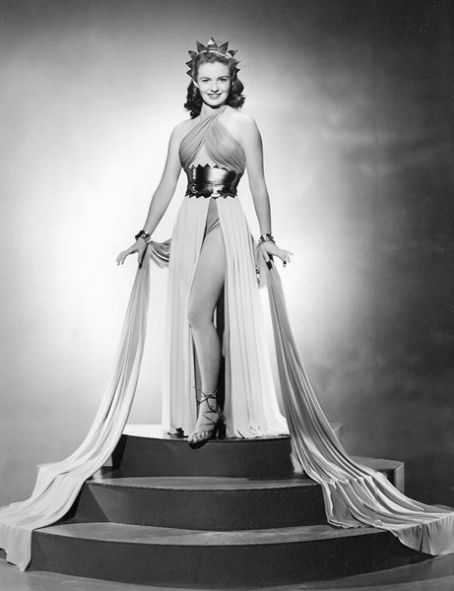
1941 studio publicity portrait

Her big break came when she signed a contract with Warner Bros. in 1941. At the time, actress Joan Blondell's name was considered too similar, so Brodel's acting name was changed to Joan Leslie.

Two weeks later, the then-15-year-old actress was asked to do a screen test while unaware which movie it was for. She got the part because she could cry on cue. The movie was High Sierra (1941), starring Ida Lupino and Humphrey Bogart. Leslie played the crippled girl, Velma. Film critic Bosley Crowther wrote: "a newcomer named Joan Leslie handles lesser roles effectively."

Later that year, Warner Bros. produced a biopic of Alvin C. York, a decorated American World War I soldier, Sergeant York (also 1941), starring Gary Cooper. Jane Russell was initially suggested for the role of Gracie Williams, York's fiancée, but York wanted an actress who neither smoked nor drank. 16-year old Leslie eventually got the part. Sergeant York was a critical and financial success, becoming the highest-grossing movie of 1941. It received 11 Oscar nominations and Cooper won the Best Actor award.

Cooper (aged 40) was 24 years her senior. "Gary gave me a doll on the set," Leslie later told the Toronto Star. "That's how he saw me."

Leslie had a supporting role in The Male Animal (1942). She played Olivia de Havilland's younger sister, Patricia Stanley, a role Gene Tierney had played in the original Broadway production.

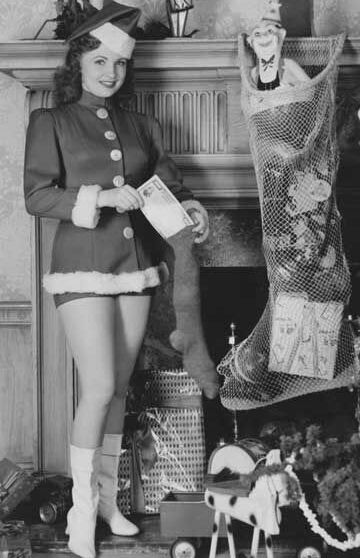
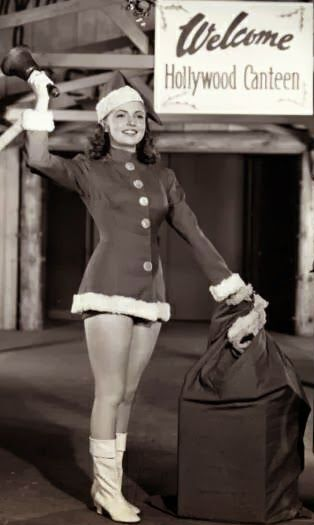
Promotional photos of Leslie for Hollywood Canteen (1944)

She auditioned for Paramount's Holiday Inn (1942), but Warner Bros. decided to cast her in Yankee Doodle Dandy (also 1942) with James Cagney. The film is a musical depicting the life of Broadway entertainer George M. Cohan. Leslie portrayed his girlfriend/wife Mary, an aspiring singer. The film received eight Oscar nominations, including a Best Actor award for James Cagney. By now, Leslie had become a star whose on-screen image was described as "sweet innocence without seeming too sugary."

Leslie was in four motion pictures released during 1943. The first was The Hard Way, starring Ida Lupino and Dennis Morgan. A New York Times reviewer described Leslie as "just as deft and versatile a lady as the character she is supposed to be." For the second, she was lent to RKO for The Sky's the Limit, starring with Fred Astaire. Leslie's character introduced the Harold Arlen-Johnny Mercer song "My Shining Hour". In the third movie, Leslie co-starred in the wartime motion picture This Is the Army with Ronald Reagan. The fourth movie was Thank Your Lucky Stars. She was considered for the role of Tessa in The Constant Nymph (also 1943), wherein she would play opposite Errol Flynn. Studio executive Jack L. Warner, though, felt she was unsuitable and the part went to Joan Fontaine. The Australian-born actor Flynn was rejected because the director wanted a British actor.

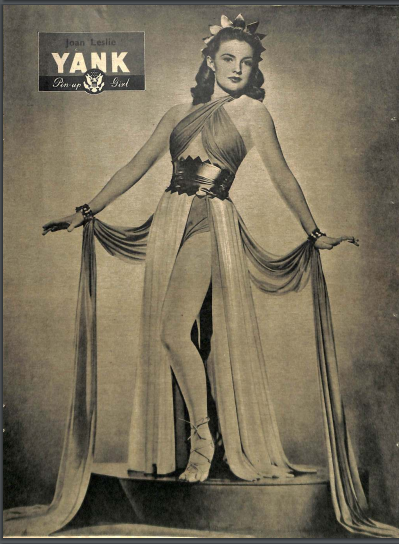
Pin-up photo of Leslie for the British edition of Yank, the Army Weekly in August 1943

During World War II, she was a regular volunteer at the Hollywood Canteen, where she danced with servicemen and signed hundreds of autographs. She was featured with Robert Hutton, among many others, in the Warner Bros. film Hollywood Canteen (1944). Like most of the other Hollywood stars appearing in the film, she played herself, but the fictionalized plot had her falling in love with a soldier (played by Hutton) frequenting the canteen. Her sister, actress Betty Brodel, briefly played herself in the film as well. In 1946, an exhibitors' poll conducted by Motion Picture Herald voted Leslie the most promising star of tomorrow.

== Later career ==
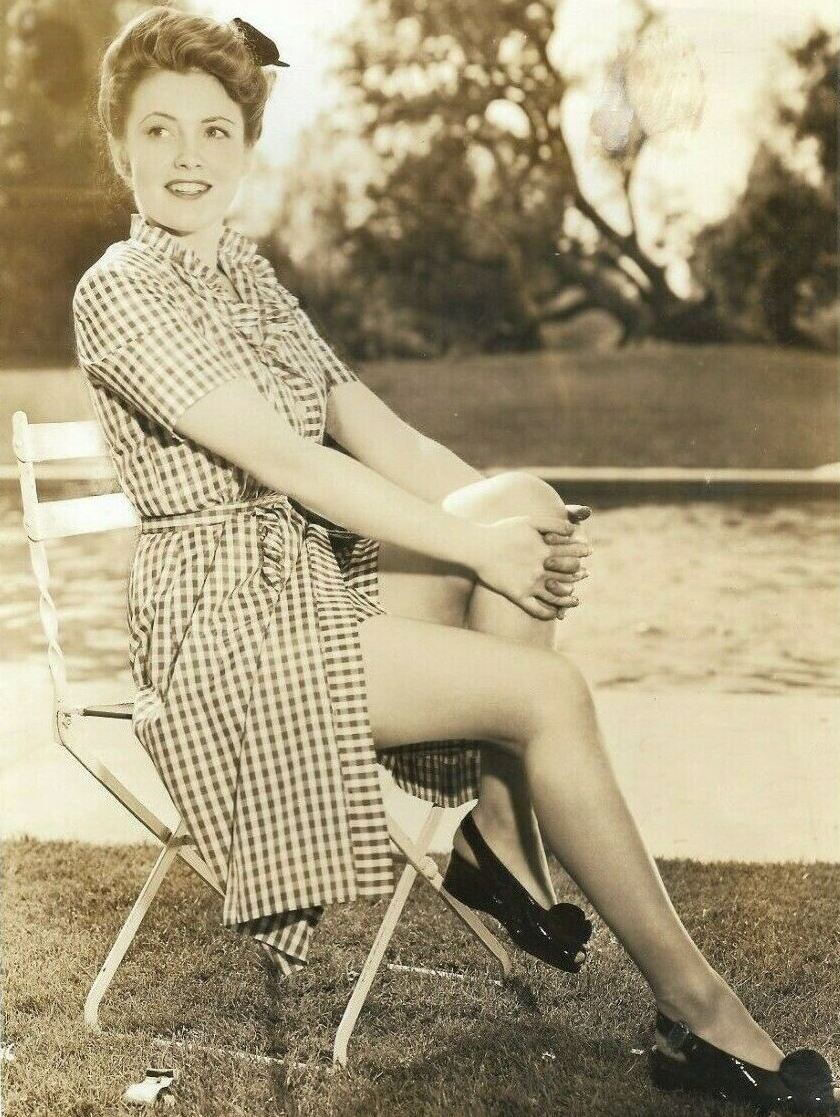
Leslie in 1946

By 1946, Leslie was growing increasingly dissatisfied with the roles offered to her by the studio. She sought more serious and mature roles, and wanted to break out of her ingenue image, which was partly due to her young age. Her decision was also based on moral and religious grounds. With the help of her lawyer Oscar Cummings, she took Warner Bros. to court to get released from her contract.

In 1947, the Catholic Theater Guild gave Leslie an award because of her "consistent refusal to use her talents and art in film productions of objectionable character."

As a result of this, Jack Warner used his influence to blacklist her from other major Hollywood studios. In 1947, she signed a two-picture contract with the poverty row studio Eagle-Lion Films. The first one was Repeat Performance (1947), a film noir in which she played a Broadway actress. The other was Northwest Stampede (1948) in which she performed with James Craig.

After her contract with Eagle-Lion Films expired, she was cast in The Skipper Surprised His Wife (1950), appearing with Robert Walker. The film was distributed by MGM, the studio with which she began her film career in 1936.

In the early 1950s, Leslie chose to focus on raising her daughters, which resulted in a more irregular film career. In 1952, she signed a short-term deal with Republic Pictures, the low-budget studio that primarily produced Westerns. One of the films she made for Republic was Flight Nurse (1953). Leslie's character, Polly Davis, was based on the successful flight nurse Lillian Kinkella Keil's career in the Air Force. It was described by the newspaper Kingsport Times-News as a thrilling film that "honors the courageous women who performed miracles of mercy above the clouds in evacuation of wounded GIs from Korean battlefields." Her last film was The Revolt of Mamie Stover (1956), but she continued making sporadic appearances in television shows while her children were at school. She retired from acting in 1991, after appearing in the TV film Fire in the Dark.

== Personal life ==
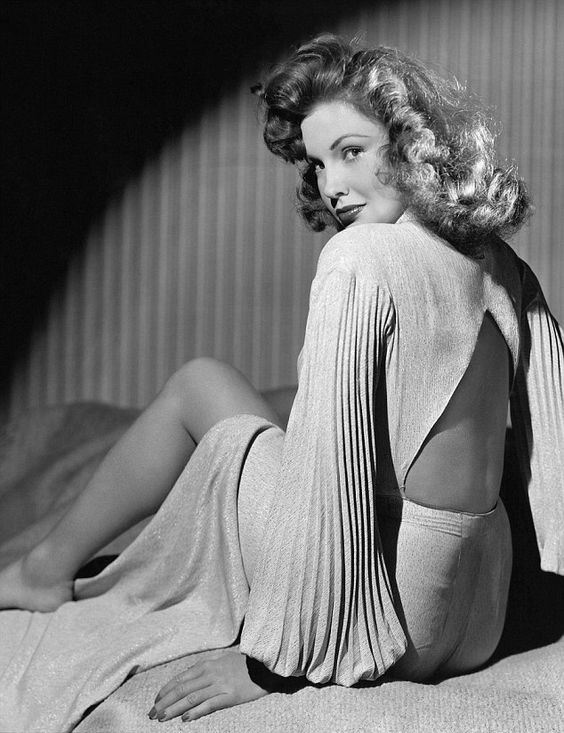
Publicity photo of Leslie

In March 1950, she married William Caldwell, an obstetrician. They had identical twin daughters. Both daughters became teachers.

Leslie designed clothing under her eponymous brand. William died in 2000. A year later, she founded the Dr. William G. and Joan L. Caldwell Chair in Gynecologic Oncology for the University of Louisville. Leslie was an adopted alumna of the university for over 32 years. A devout Catholic, she was involved with charity work for the St. Anne's Maternity Home for more than 50 years.

== Death ==
Leslie died on October 12, 2015, in Los Angeles, California. She was 90.

== Awards and honors ==
- On October 8, 1960, Joan Leslie received a star on the Hollywood Walk of Fame at 1560 Vine Street.
- In 1999, she was one of the 250 actresses nominated for the American Film Institute's selection of the 25 greatest female screen legends to have debuted before 1950.
- On August 12, 2006, she received a Golden Boot Award for her contributions to Western television shows and movies.

== Complete filmography ==
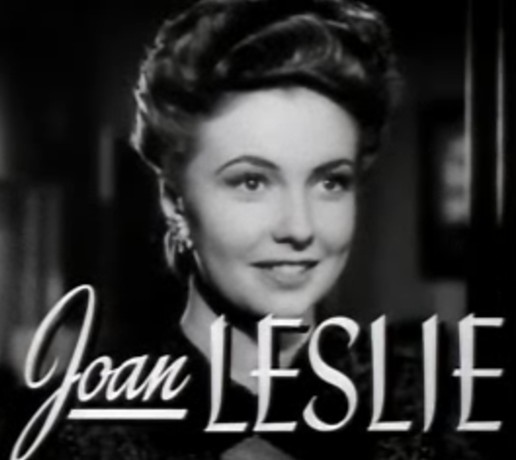
Leslie in The Hard Way (1943)

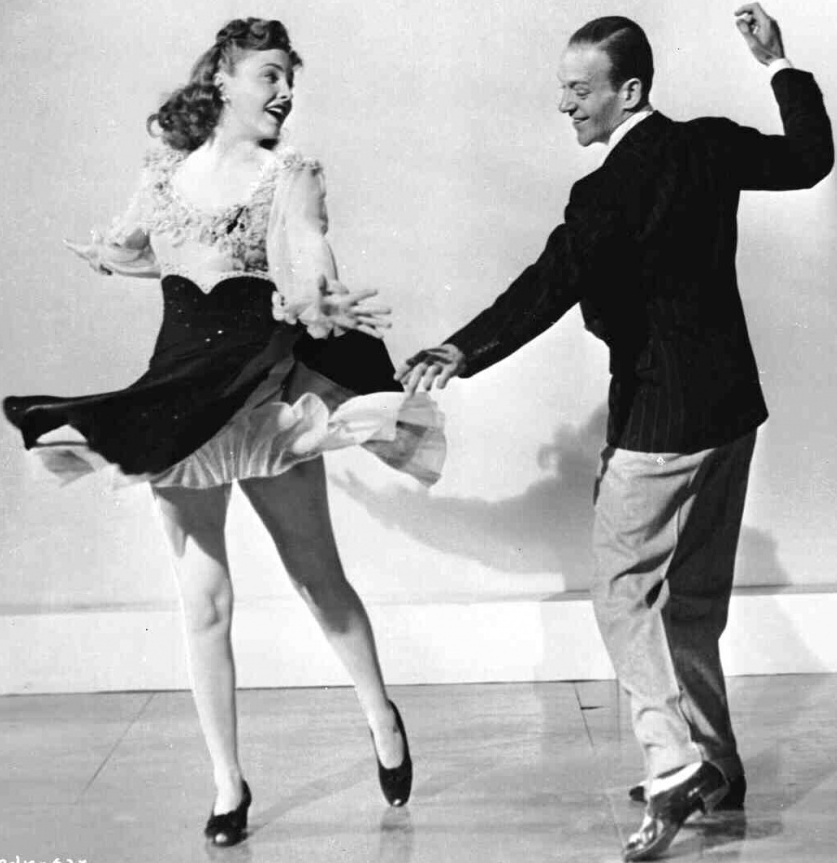
Leslie with Fred Astaire for The Sky's the Limit (1943)

Leslie in This Is the Army (1943)

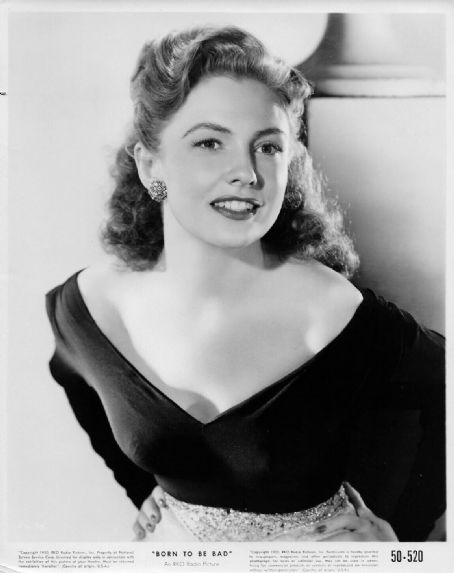
Leslie in Born to Be Bad (1950)

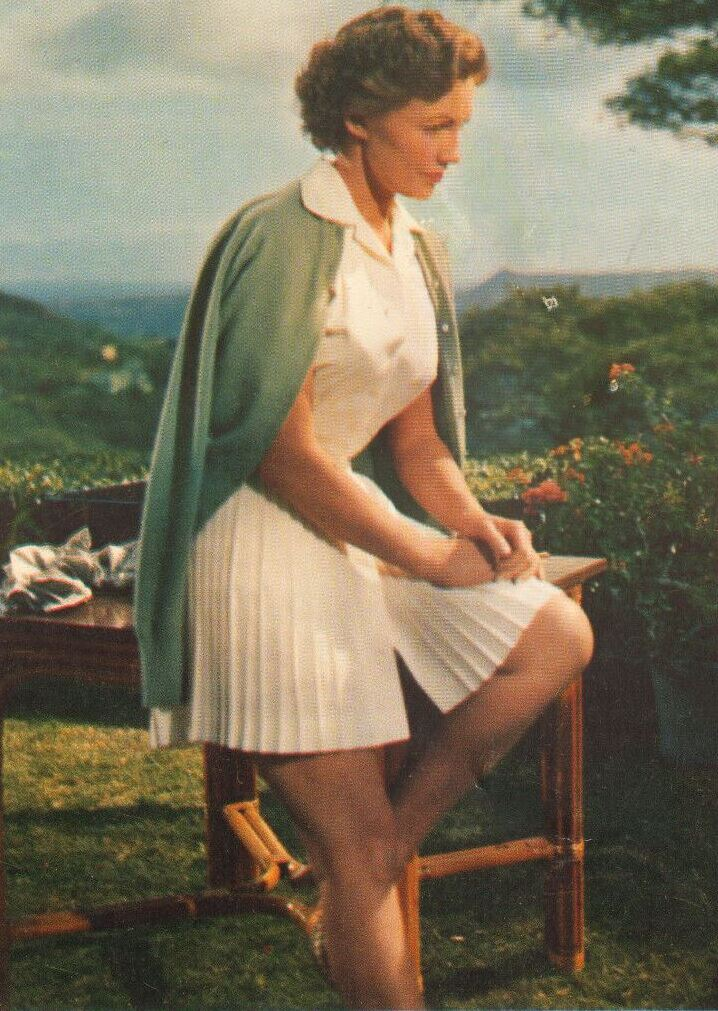
Leslie in The Revolt of Mamie Stover (1956), her last film appearance

| Year | Title | Role | Studio | Notes |
|---|---|---|---|---|
| 1936 | Signing Off | Joan Brodel | | Short film |
| 1936 | Camille | Marie Jeanette | MGM | Uncredited |
| 1938 | Men with Wings | Patricia Falconer at age 11 | Paramount | Uncredited. Shared role with sister, who replaced her when Joan's real age discovered. |
| 1939 | Nancy Drew... Reporter | Mayme, journalist student | Warner Bros. | Uncredited |
| 1939 | Love Affair | Autograph seeker | RKO | Uncredited |
| 1939 | Winter Carnival | Betsy Phillips | Walter Wanger Productions | As Joan Brodel |
| 1939 | Two Thoroughbreds | Wendy Conway | RKO | As Joan Brodel |
| 1940 | Laddie | Shelley Stanton | RKO | As Joan Brodel |
| 1940 | High School | Patsy | 20th Century Fox | Uncredited |
| 1940 | Young as You Feel | Girl | 20th Century Fox | As Joan Brodel |
| 1940 | Alice in Movieland | Alice Purdee | Warner Bros. | Short film |
| 1940 | Star Dust | College girl | 20th Century Fox | Uncredited |
| 1940 | Susan and God | Party Guest | MGM | Uncredited |
| 1940 | Military Academy | Marjorie Blake | Columbia | As Joan Brodel |
| 1940 | Foreign Correspondent | Johnny Jones' Sister | Walter Wanger Productions | Uncredited |
| 1941 | High Sierra | Velma | Warner Bros. | |
| 1941 | The Great Mr. Nobody | Mary Clover | Warner Bros. | |
| 1941 | The Wagons Roll at Night | Mary Coster | Warner Bros. | |
| 1941 | Thieves Fall Out | Mary Matthews | Warner Bros. | |
| 1941 | Sergeant York | Gracie Williams | Warner Bros. | |
| 1941 | Nine Lives Are Not Enough | Newspaper receptionist | Warner Bros. | Uncredited |
| 1942 | The Male Animal | Patricia Stanley | Warner Bros. | |
| 1942 | Yankee Doodle Dandy | Mary Cohan | Warner Bros. | |
| 1943 | The Hard Way | Katie Blaine | Warner Bros. | |
| 1943 | The Sky's the Limit | Joan Manion | RKO | |
| 1943 | This Is the Army | Eileen Dibble | Warner Bros. | |
| 1943 | Thank Your Lucky Stars | Pat Dixon | Warner Bros. | |
| 1944 | Hollywood Canteen | Herself | Warner Bros. | |
| 1944 | I Am an American | Herself | Warner Bros. | Short film, Uncredited |
| 1945 | Where Do We Go from Here? | Sally Smith / Prudence / Katrina | 20th Century Fox | |
| 1945 | Rhapsody in Blue | Julie Adams | Warner Bros. | |
| 1945 | Too Young to Know | Sally Sawyer | Warner Bros. | |
| 1946 | Cinderella Jones | Judy Jones | Warner Bros. | |
| 1946 | Janie Gets Married | Janie Conway | Warner Bros. | |
| 1946 | Two Guys from Milwaukee | Connie Reed | Warner Bros. | |
| 1947 | Repeat Performance | Sheila Page | Eagle-Lion | |
| 1948 | Northwest Stampede | Christine "Honey" Johnson | Eagle-Lion | |
| 1950 | The Skipper Surprised His Wife | Daphne Lattimer | MGM | |
| 1950 | Born to Be Bad | Donna Foster | RKO | |
| 1951 | Man in the Saddle | Laurie Bidwell Isham | Columbia | |
| 1952 | Hellgate | Ellen Hanley | Commander Films | |
| 1952 | Toughest Man in Arizona | Mary Kimber | Republic | |
| 1953 | Woman They Almost Lynched | Sally Maris | Republic | |
| 1953 | Flight Nurse | Lt. Polly Davis | Republic | |
| 1954 | Jubilee Trail | Garnet Hale | Republic | |
| 1954 | Hell's Outpost | Sarah Moffit | Republic | |
| 1956 | The Revolt of Mamie Stover | Annalee Johnson | 20th Century Fox | |

== Television ==
| Year | Title | Role | Notes |
|---|---|---|---|
| 1951 | Family Theater | Claudia Procles | Episode: " Hill Number One: A Story of Faith and Inspiration" |
| 1951 | The Bigelow Theatre | | Episode: "Flowers for John" |
| 1951–52 | Fireside Theater | Ilse | Episodes: "Black Savannah", "The Imposter" |
| 1952 | Schlitz Playhouse of Stars | | Episode: "The Von Linden File" |
| 1953 | Summer Theater | Ada Jordan | Episode: "Dream Job" |
| 1953–54 | Ford Theatre | Marie Pasquin/Susan Farrington | Episodes: "The Old Man's Bride", "Wonderful Day for a Wedding", "Girl in Flight" |
| 1954 | Lux Video Theatre | Vanessa Cook | Episode: "Pick of the Litter" |
| 1955 | Studio 57 | Jane Merlin | Episode: "Vacation with Pay" |
| 1956 | The 20th Century Fox Hour | Peg | Episode: "Smoke Jumpers" |
| 1956 | Chevron Hall of Stars | | Episode: "Conflict" |
| 1958 | The Christophers | | Episode: "Find the Good Within You" |
| 1959 | General Electric Theater | Sarah Owens | Episode: "The Day of the Hanging" |
| 1965 | Branded | Emily Cooper | Episode: "Leap Upon Mountains" |
| 1975 | Police Story | Mary Devereux | Episode: "Headhunter" |
| 1976 | The Keegans | Mary Keegan | TV movie |
| 1978 | Charlie's Angels | Catherine Calhoun | Episode: "The Jade Trap" |
| 1979 | The Incredible Hulk | Lily Beaumont | Episode: "My Favourite Magician" |
| 1983 | Simon & Simon | Toni Meyers | Episode: "Shadow of Sam Penny" |
| 1983 | Shadow of Sam Penny | | |
| 1986 | Charley Hannah | Sandy Hannah | TV movie |
| 1988 | Murder, She Wrote | Lillian Appletree | Episode: "Mr. Pennroy's Vacation" |
| 1989 | Turn Back the Clock | Party Guest | TV movie |
| 1991 | Fire in the Dark | Ruthie | TV movie, (final film role) |

== Radio appearances ==
| Year | Program | Episode/source |
|---|---|---|
| 1942 | Screen Guild Players | Yankee Doodle Dandy |
