= List of Lux Radio Theatre episodes =

Lux Radio Theatre was an American radio show that ran on the NBC Blue Network (1934–35), the CBS Radio network (Columbia Broadcasting System) (1935–54), and NBC Radio (1954–55). Every week they broadcast an hour-long adaptation of a popular film or Broadway play, often starring members of the original cast.

NOTE: First broadcast dates are currently listed in year-month-day (YYYY-MM-DD) format.

== Episodes: 1934–1939 ==
=== 1934 ===
1934
| First broadcast | Title | Starring | Notes |
|---|---|---|---|
| 1934-10-14 | 7th Heaven | Miriam Hopkins, John Boles | First New York broadcast. |
| 1934-10-21 | What Every Woman Knows | Helen Hayes | |
| 1934-10-28 | The Barker | Walter Huston | Filmed in 1933 as Hoop-La |
| 1934-11-04 | Smilin' Through | Jane Cowl | |
| 1934-11-11 | The Nervous Wreck | June Walker | |
| 1934-11-18 | Rebound | Ruth Chatterton | |
| 1934-11-25 | Mrs Dane's Defence | Ethel Barrymore | |
| 1934-12-02 | Let Us Be Gay | Tallulah Bankhead | |
| 1934-12-09 | Berkeley Square | Leslie Howard | |
| 1934-12-16 | Turn to the Right | James Cagney | |
| 1934-12-23 | The Goose Hangs High | Walter Connolly | Filmed in 1932 as This Reckless Age |
| 1934-12-30 | Daddy Long Legs | John Boles | |

=== 1935 ===
1935
| First broadcast | Title | Starring | Notes |
|---|---|---|---|
| 1935-01-06 | The Green Goddess | Claude Rains | |
| 1935-01-13 | Counsellor at Law | Paul Muni | |
| 1935-01-20 | The Late Christopher Bean | Walter Connolly | Filmed in 1933 as Christopher Bean |
| 1935-01-27 | The Bad Man | Walter Huston | |
| 1935-02-03 | Peg o' My Heart | Margaret Sullavan | |
| 1935-02-10 | The First Year | Lila Lee | |
| 1935-02-17 | The Old Soak | Wallace Beery | |
| 1935-02-24 | Nothing But the Truth | Frank Morgan | |
| 1935-03-03 | Lilac Time | Jane Cowl | |
| 1935-03-10 | Holiday | Claudette Colbert | |
| 1935-03-17 | Her Master's Voice | Roland Young | |
| 1935-03-24 | Secrets | Irene Dunne | |
| 1935-03-31 | The Romantic Age | Leslie Howard | |
| 1935-04-07 | The Prince Chap | Gary Cooper | |
| 1935-04-14 | The Broken Wing | Lupe Vélez | |
| 1935-04-21 | Little Women | Lillian Gish | |
| 1935-04-28 | Ada Beats the Drum | Mary Boland | |
| 1935-05-05 | Adam and Eva | Cary Grant | |
| 1935-05-12 | The Bishop Misbehaves | Walter Connolly | |
| 1935-05-19 | The Lion and the Mouse | Ruth Chatterton | |
| 1935-05-26 | Michael and Mary | Elissa Landi, Kenneth MacKenna | |
| 1935-06-02 | The Vinegar Tree | Billie Burke | |
| 1935-06-09 | Candle Light | Robert Montgomery, Irene Purcell | |
| 1935-06-16 | The Patsy | Loretta Young | |
| 1935-06-23 | Polly With a Past | Ina Claire | |
| 1935-06-30 | Elmer, the Great | Joe E. Brown | |
| 1935-07-29 | Bunty Pulls the Strings | Helen Hayes | |
| 1935-08-05 | Lightnin' | Wallace Beery | |
| 1935-08-12 | The Man in Possession | Robert Montgomery | |
| 1935-08-19 | Ladies of the Jury | Mary Boland | |
| 1935-08-26 | The Church Mouse | Otto Kruger | |
| 1935-09-02 | Whistling in the Dark | Charles Ruggles | |
| 1935-09-09 | Petticoat Influence | Ruth Chatterton | |
| 1935-09-16 | Leah Kleschna | Conrad Nagel | |
| 1935-09-23 | Mary, Mary, Quite Contrary | Ethel Barrymore | |
| 1935-09-30 | Alias Jimmy Valentine | Richard Barthelmess | |
| 1935-10-07 | The Wren | Helen Chandler | |
| 1935-10-14 | Within the Law | Joan Crawford | |
| 1935-10-21 | Merely Mary Ann | Joan Bennett | |
| 1935-10-28 | Dulcy | ZaSu Pitts, Gene Lockhart | Only extant episode broadcast from New York City. |
| 1935-11-04 | The Milky Way | Charles Butterworth | |
| 1935-11-11 | His Misleading Lady | Clark Gable | |
| 1935-11-18 | Sherlock Holmes | William Gillette | |
| 1935-11-25 | Way Down East | Lillian Gish | |
| 1935-12-02 | The Swan | Elissa Landi | |
| 1935-12-09 | The Show-Off | Joe E. Brown | |
| 1935-12-16 | The Truth | Grace George | |
| 1935-12-23 | Applesauce | Jack Oakie | |
| 1935-12-30 | The Queen's Husband | Frank Morgan | |

=== 1936 ===
1936
| First broadcast | Title | Starring | Notes |
|---|---|---|---|
| 1936-01-06 | The Third Degree | Sylvia Sidney | |
| 1936-01-13 | The Boss | Edward G. Robinson | |
| 1936-01-20 | A Prince There Was | Ricardo Cortez | |
| 1936-01-27 | Grumpy | Lionel Barrymore | |
| 1936-02-03 | Green Grow the Lilacs | John Boles | |
| 1936-02-10 | The Bride the Sun Shines On | Douglas Fairbanks Jr. | |
| 1936-02-17 | The Old Soak | Wallace Beery | |
| 1936-02-24 | Peter Pan | Freddie Bartholomew | |
| 1936-03-02 | Alias the Deacon | Victor Moore | |
| 1936-03-09 | The Girl of the Golden West | Eva Le Gallienne | |
| 1936-03-16 | The Last of Mrs. Cheyney | Miriam Hopkins | |
| 1936-03-23 | The Song and Dance Man | George M. Cohan | |
| 1936-03-30 | Bought and Paid For | Bette Davis | |
| 1936-04-06 | Kick In | Edmund Lowe, Ann Sothern | |
| 1936-04-13 | Shore Leave | Lee Tracy | |
| 1936-04-20 | Harmony Lane | Lawrence Tibbett | |
| 1936-04-27 | Under Cover | Richard Barthelmess, Sally Eilers | |
| 1936-05-04 | The Music Master | Jean Hersholt | |
| 1936-05-11 | Bittersweet | Irene Dunne | |
| 1936-05-18 | Get-Rich-Quick Wallingford | George M. Cohan | |
| 1936-05-25 | East Is West | Fay Bainter | Last New York broadcast. |
| 1936-06-01 | The Legionnaire and the Lady | Marlene Dietrich, Clark Gable | First Hollywood broadcast. Filmed in 1930 as Morocco. |
| 1936-06-08 | The Thin Man | William Powell, Myrna Loy | |
| 1936-06-15 | Burlesque | Al Jolson, Ruby Keeler | Filmed in 1929 as The Dance of Life |
| 1936-06-22 | The Dark Angel | Merle Oberon, Herbert Marshall | |
| 1936-06-29 | Irene | Jeanette MacDonald, Regis Toomey | |
| 1936-07-06 | The Voice of Bugle Ann | Lionel Barrymore, Anne Shirley | |
| 1936-07-13 | The Brat | Marion Davies, Joel McCrea | |
| 1936-07-20 | The Barker | Claudette Colbert, Walter Huston | |
| 1936-07-27 | Chained | Joan Crawford, Franchot Tone | |
| 1936-08-03 | Main Street | Barbara Stanwyck, Fred MacMurray | |
| 1936-08-10 | The Jazz Singer | Al Jolson | |
| 1936-08-17 | The Vagabond King | John Boles, Evelyn Venable | |
| 1936-08-24 | One Sunday Afternoon | Jack Oakie, Helen Twelvetrees | |
| 1936-08-31 | Cheating Cheaters | George Raft, June Lang | |
| 1936-09-07 | Is Zat So? | James Cagney, Robert Armstrong | |
| 1936-09-14 | Quality Street | Brian Aherne, Ruth Chatterton | |
| 1936-09-21 | Trilby | Grace Moore, Peter Lorre | |
| 1936-09-28 | The Plutocrat | Wallace Beery | |
| 1936-10-05 | Elmer, the Great | Joe E. Brown | |
| 1936-10-12 | The Curtain Rises | Ginger Rogers, Warren William | |
| 1936-10-19 | Captain Applejack | Frank Morgan | |
| 1936-10-26 | Saturday's Children | Robert Taylor, Olivia de Havilland | |
| 1936-11-02 | The Virginian | Gary Cooper, Charles Bickford | |
| 1936-11-09 | Alias Jimmy Valentine | Pat O'Brien, Madge Evans | |
| 1936-11-16 | Conversation Piece | Lily Pons, Adolphe Menjou | |
| 1936-11-23 | The Story of Louis Pasteur | Paul Muni, Fritz Leiber | |
| 1936-11-30 | Polly of the Circus | Loretta Young, James Gleason | |
| 1936-12-07 | The Grand Duchess and the Waiter | Robert Montgomery, Elissa Landi | |
| 1936-12-14 | Madame Sans-Gêne | Jean Harlow, Robert Taylor | |
| 1936-12-21 | Gold Diggers | Joan Blondell, Dick Powell | During the introduction host Cecil B. DeMille explained that this adaptation combined the plot of Gold Diggers of 1933 with the music of Gold Diggers of 1937. |
| 1936-12-28 | Cavalcade | Herbert Marshall, Madeleine Carroll | |

=== 1937 ===
1937
| First broadcast | Title | Starring | Notes |
|---|---|---|---|
| 1937-01-04 | Men in White | Spencer Tracy, Frances Farmer | |
| 1937-01-11 | The Gilded Lily | Claudette Colbert, Fred MacMurray | |
| 1937-01-18 | The Criminal Code | Edward G. Robinson, Beverly Roberts | |
| 1937-01-25 | Tonight or Never | Jeanette MacDonald, Melvyn Douglas | |
| 1937-02-01 | Mr. Deeds Goes to Town | Gary Cooper, Jean Arthur | |
| 1937-02-08 | Graustark | Gene Raymond, Anna Sten | |
| 1937-02-15 | Brewster's Millions | Jack Benny, Mary Livingstone | |
| 1937-02-22 | Captain Blood | Errol Flynn, Olivia de Havilland | |
| 1937-03-01 | Cappy Ricks | Charles Winninger, Richard Arlen | |
| 1937-03-08 | Madame Butterfly | Cary Grant, Grace Moore | |
| 1937-03-15 | Desire | Marlene Dietrich, Herbert Marshall | |
| 1937-03-22 | Death Takes a Holiday | Fredric March, Florence Eldridge | |
| 1937-03-29 | Dulcy | George Burns, Gracie Allen | |
| 1937-04-05 | A Farewell to Arms | Clark Gable, Josephine Hutchinson | |
| 1937-04-12 | Dodsworth | Walter Huston | |
| 1937-04-19 | Alibi Ike | Joe E. Brown, Helen Chandler | |
| 1937-04-26 | Magnificent Obsession | Robert Taylor, Irene Dunne | |
| 1937-05-03 | Hands Across the Table | Claudette Colbert, Joel McCrea | |
| 1937-05-10 | Mary of Scotland | Joan Crawford, Franchot Tone | |
| 1937-05-17 | Another Language | Bette Davis, Fred MacMurray | |
| 1937-05-24 | Under Two Flags | Herbert Marshall, Olivia de Havilland | |
| 1937-05-31 | The Plainsman | Fredric March, Joan Fontaine | |
| 1937-06-07 | British Agent | Errol Flynn, Frances Farmer | There is an announcement of Jean Harlow's death at the end of the show, who died only hours before it was broadcast. Intelligence agent and MGM film researcher Nathalie Bucknall was interviewed during the broadcast. |
| 1937-06-14 | Madame X | James Stewart, Ann Harding | |
| 1937-06-21 | Monsieur Beaucaire | Leslie Howard, Elissa Landi | |
| 1937-06-28 | The Front Page | Walter Winchell, James Gleason | A planned interview with Amelia Earhart was postponed to the next week due to a delay in her soon-to-be doomed attempt of an around-the-world flight. |
| 1937-07-05 | Beau Brummel | Robert Montgomery, Madge Evans | Amelia Earhart was originally planned to be a guest in this show, but she disappeared on July 2 of that year. Cecil B. DeMille mentions this at the beginning of the program. |
| 1937-09-13 | A Star Is Born | Janet Gaynor, Robert Montgomery | |
| 1937-09-20 | The Outsider | Fredric March, Florence Eldridge | |
| 1937-09-27 | Cimarron | Clark Gable, Virginia Bruce | |
| 1937-10-04 | Dodsworth | Walter Huston, Nan Sunderland | |
| 1937-10-11 | Stella Dallas | Barbara Stanwyck, John Boles | |
| 1937-10-18 | Up Pops the Devil | Fred MacMurray, Madge Evans | |
| 1937-10-25 | Arrowsmith | Spencer Tracy, Fay Wray | |
| 1937-11-01 | A Free Soul | Ginger Rogers, Don Ameche | |
| 1937-11-08 | She Loves Me Not | Bing Crosby, Joan Blondell, Nan Grey, Sterling Holloway, William Frawley | Crosby says that "Bing" came from the sound he made, holding his wooden guns, playing "Cops and Robbers" as a child. (51:45) |
| 1937-11-15 | Come and Get It | Edward Arnold, Anne Shirley | |
| 1937-11-22 | The Petrified Forest | Herbert Marshall, Margaret Sullavan | |
| 1937-11-29 | Peg o' My Heart | Marion Davies, Brian Aherne | |
| 1937-12-06 | These Three | Errol Flynn, Mary Astor | |
| 1937-12-13 | The 39 Steps | Robert Montgomery, Ida Lupino | |
| 1937-12-20 | The Song of Songs | Marlene Dietrich, Douglas Fairbanks Jr. | |
| 1937-12-27 | Beloved Enemy | Madeleine Carroll | |

=== 1938 ===
1938
| First broadcast | Title | Starring | Notes |
|---|---|---|---|
| 1938-01-03 | Alice Adams | Claudette Colbert, Fred MacMurray | |
| 1938-01-10 | Enter Madame | Grace Moore, Basil Rathbone | |
| 1938-01-17 | Disraeli | George Arliss, Florence Arliss | |
| 1938-01-24 | Clarence | Bob Burns, Gail Patrick | |
| 1938-01-31 | Green Light | Errol Flynn, Olivia de Havilland | |
| 1938-02-07 | Anna Christie | Joan Crawford, Spencer Tracy | |
| 1938-02-14 | Brief Moment | Ginger Rogers, Douglas Fairbanks Jr. | |
| 1938-02-21 | Romance | Madeleine Carroll, Herbert Marshall | |
| 1938-02-28 | Forsaking All Others | Bette Davis, Joel McCrea | |
| 1938-03-07 | Poppy | W. C. Fields, John Payne | |
| 1938-03-14 | The Boss | Fay Wray, Edward Arnold | |
| 1938-03-21 | The Man Who Played God | George Arliss, Florence Arliss | |
| 1938-03-28 | Naughty Marietta | Lawrence Tibbett, Helen Jepson | |
| 1938-04-04 | Dark Victory | Barbara Stanwyck, Melvyn Douglas | Cecil B. DeMille was taken ill before broadcast, and he was stood in for by Edward Arnold. |
| 1938-04-11 | Mary Burns, Fugitive | Miriam Hopkins, Mary Astor | Cecil B. DeMille was still unwell, and Edward Arnold hosted the program again. |
| 1938-04-18 | Mad About Music | Deanna Durbin, Herbert Marshall | Walter Huston hosted the show as C.B. was still unwell. It was announced he was recovering, and would return to the stage the next week. |
| 1938-04-25 | Dangerous | Madeleine Carroll, Don Ameche | |
| 1938-05-02 | The Prisoner of Shark Island | Gary Cooper, Fay Wray | |
| 1938-05-09 | My Man Godfrey | William Powell, Carole Lombard, David Niven | |
| 1938-05-16 | The Girl from 10th Avenue | Loretta Young, George Brent | |
| 1938-05-23 | The Letter | Merle Oberon, Walter Huston | |
| 1938-05-30 | I Met My Love Again | Joan Bennett, Henry Fonda | |
| 1938-06-06 | A Doll's House | Joan Crawford, Basil Rathbone | |
| 1938-06-13 | Theodora Goes Wild | Cary Grant, Irene Dunne | |
| 1938-06-20 | Manslaughter | Fredric March | |
| 1938-06-27 | Jane Eyre | Helen Hayes, Robert Montgomery | |
| 1938-07-04 | I Found Stella Parish | Herbert Marshall | |
| 1938-09-12 | Spawn of the North | Dorothy Lamour, George Raft | |
| 1938-09-19 | Morning Glory | Barbara Stanwyck, Ralph Bellamy | |
| 1938-09-26 | Seven Keys to Baldpate | Jack Benny, Mary Livingstone | This episode was only loosely based on the film. All the actors play caricatures of themselves. |
| 1938-10-03 | Another Dawn | Madeleine Carroll, Franchot Tone | |
| 1938-10-10 | Viva Villa! | Wallace Beery, Noah Beery Sr. | |
| 1938-10-17 | Seventh Heaven | Jean Arthur, Don Ameche | |
| 1938-10-24 | Babbitt | Edward Arnold | |
| 1938-10-31 | That Certain Woman | Carole Lombard, Basil Rathbone | |
| 1938-11-07 | Next Time We Love | Margaret Sullavan | |
| 1938-11-14 | The Buccaneer | Clark Gable | |
| 1938-11-21 | Confession | Miriam Hopkins | |
| 1938-11-28 | Interference | Herbert Marshall, Leslie Howard | |
| 1938-12-05 | The Princess Comes Across | Fred MacMurray | |
| 1938-12-12 | The Scarlet Pimpernel | Leslie Howard, Olivia de Havilland | |
| 1938-12-19 | Kid Galahad | Joan Bennett, Edward G. Robinson | |
| 1938-12-26 | Snow White and the Seven Dwarfs | Walt Disney Productions | |

=== 1939 ===
1939
| First broadcast | Title | Starring | Notes |
|---|---|---|---|
| 1939-01-02 | The Perfect Specimen | Errol Flynn, Joan Blondell | |
| 1939-01-09 | Mayerling | William Powell, Janet Gaynor | |
| 1939-01-16 | Front Page Woman | Paulette Goddard | |
| 1939-01-23 | Cardinal Richelieu | George Arliss, Cesar Romero | |
| 1939-01-30 | The Arkansas Traveler | Bob Burns, Fay Bainter | |
| 1939-02-06 | The Count of Monte Cristo | Robert Montgomery | |
| 1939-02-13 | The Return of Peter Grimm | Lionel Barrymore, Maureen O'Sullivan | |
| 1939-02-20 | Stage Door | Ginger Rogers, Rosalind Russell | |
| 1939-02-27 | Ceiling Zero | James Cagney, Ralph Bellamy | |
| 1939-03-06 | One Way Passage | William Powell, Kay Francis | Kay Francis replaced Norma Shearer who dropped out at the last minute due to illness |
| 1939-03-13 | So Big! | Barbara Stanwyck, Preston Foster | |
| 1939-03-20 | It Happened One Night | Claudette Colbert, Clark Gable | |
| 1939-03-27 | A Man's Castle | Loretta Young, Spencer Tracy | |
| 1939-04-03 | Silver Dollar | Edward Arnold, Anita Louise | |
| 1939-04-10 | The Lives of a Bengal Lancer | Errol Flynn, Brian Aherne | |
| 1939-04-17 | Bullets or Ballots | Edward G. Robinson, Humphrey Bogart | |
| 1939-04-24 | Broadway Bill | Robert Taylor, Frances Dee | |
| 1939-05-01 | Lady for a Day | May Robson, Warren William | Leslie Howard, guest producer/director |
| 1939-05-08 | The Life of Emile Zola | Paul Muni, Josephine Hutchinson | Leslie Howard, guest producer/director |
| 1939-05-15 | Tovarich | William Powell, Miriam Hopkins | |
| 1939-05-22 | Angels with Dirty Faces | James Cagney, Pat O'Brien | |
| 1939-05-29 | Only Angels Have Wings | Cary Grant, Rita Hayworth | |
| 1939-06-05 | The Prisoner of Zenda | Ronald Colman, Douglas Fairbanks Jr. | |
| 1939-06-12 | White Banners | Fay Bainter, Lewis Stone | |
| 1939-06-19 | The Ex-Mrs. Bradford | William Powell, Claudette Colbert | |
| 1939-06-26 | Mrs Moonlight | Janet Gaynor, George Brent | |
| 1939-07-03 | Bordertown | Don Ameche, Joan Bennett | |
| 1939-07-10 | Ruggles of Red Gap | Charles Ruggles, Charles Laughton | |
| 1939-09-11 | The Awful Truth | Cary Grant, Claudette Colbert | |
| 1939-09-18 | Wuthering Heights | Barbara Stanwyck, Brian Aherne | |
| 1939-09-25 | She Married Her Boss | Ginger Rogers, George Brent | |
| 1939-10-02 | You Can't Take It With You | Edward Arnold, Fay Wray | |
| 1939-10-09 | The Sisters | Irene Dunne, David Niven | |
| 1939-10-16 | If I Were King | Douglas Fairbanks Jr., Frances Dee | |
| 1939-10-23 | Invitation to Happiness | Fred MacMurray, Madeleine Carroll | |
| 1939-10-30 | The Old Maid | Loretta Young, Miriam Hopkins | |
| 1939-11-06 | Only Yesterday | Barbara Stanwyck | |
| 1939-11-13 | The Champ | Wallace Beery | |
| 1939-11-20 | Goodbye, Mr. Chips | Laurence Olivier | |
| 1939-11-27 | Pygmalion | Jean Arthur, Brian Aherne | |
| 1939-12-04 | A Man to Remember | Bob Burns, Anita Louise | |
| 1939-12-11 | In Name Only | Carole Lombard, Cary Grant | |
| 1939-12-18 | Four Daughters | The Lane Sisters, John Garfield | |
| 1939-12-25 | Pinocchio | Walt Disney Productions | |

== Episodes: 1940–1949 ==
=== 1940 ===
1940
| First broadcast | Title | Starring | Notes |
|---|---|---|---|
| 1940-01-01 | Sorrell and Son | Herbert Marshall | Special Father's Day episode. |
| 1940-01-08 | Dark Victory | Bette Davis, Spencer Tracy | |
| 1940-01-15 | Sing You Sinners | Bing Crosby, Ralph Bellamy | |
| 1940-01-22 | Bachelor Mother | Ginger Rogers, Fredric March | |
| 1940-01-29 | Intermezzo | Herbert Marshall, Ingrid Bergman | |
| 1940-02-05 | The Young in Heart | Don Ameche, Ida Lupino | |
| 1940-02-12 | Sidewalks of London | Charles Laughton, Elsa Lanchester | |
| 1940-02-19 | Made for Each Other | Carole Lombard, Fred MacMurray | |
| 1940-02-26 | Swing High, Swing Low | Rudy Vallée, Virginia Bruce | |
| 1940-03-04 | Trade Winds | Errol Flynn, Joan Bennett | |
| 1940-03-11 | My Son, My Son! | Madeleine Carroll, Brian Aherne | |
| 1940-03-18 | The Rains Came | George Brent, Kay Francis | |
| 1940-03-25 | Remember the Night | Fred MacMurray, Barbara Stanwyck | |
| 1940-04-01 | Love Affair | Irene Dunne, William Powell | |
| 1940-04-08 | Mama Loves Papa | Fibber McGee and Molly | |
| 1940-04-15 | The Under-Pup | Robert Cummings | |
| 1940-04-22 | Abe Lincoln in Illinois | Raymond Massey, Fay Bainter | |
| 1940-04-29 | Smilin' Through | Robert Taylor, Barbara Stanwyck | |
| 1940-05-06 | Our Town | William Holden, Martha Scott | |
| 1940-05-13 | True Confession | Loretta Young, Fred MacMurray | |
| 1940-05-20 | Midnight | Claudette Colbert, Don Ameche | |
| 1940-05-27 | Vigil in the Night | Olivia de Havilland, Herbert Marshall | |
| 1940-06-03 | Alexander's Ragtime Band | Alice Faye, Ray Milland | |
| 1940-06-10 | 'Til We Meet Again | Merle Oberon, Pat O'Brien | |
| 1940-06-17 | After the Thin Man | William Powell | |
| 1940-06-24 | Show Boat | Irene Dunne, Allan Jones | |
| 1940-07-01 | Alias the Deacon | Bob Burns | |
| 1940-07-08 | To the Ladies | Helen Hayes, Otto Kruger | |
| 1940-09-09 | Manhattan Melodrama | William Powell, Myrna Loy, Don Ameche | |
| 1940-09-16 | Love Is News | Bob Hope, Madeleine Carroll | |
| 1940-09-23 | The Westerner | Gary Cooper, Walter Brennan | |
| 1940-09-30 | His Girl Friday | Claudette Colbert, Fred MacMurray | |
| 1940-10-07 | Wings of the Navy | George Brent, Olivia de Havilland | |
| 1940-10-14 | The Littlest Rebel | Shirley Temple, Claude Rains | |
| 1940-10-21 | Lillian Russell | Alice Faye, Edward Arnold | |
| 1940-10-28 | Strike Up the Band | Judy Garland, Mickey Rooney | |
| 1940-11-04 | Wuthering Heights | Ida Lupino, Basil Rathbone | |
| 1940-11-11 | Nothing Sacred | Douglas Fairbanks Jr., Joan Bennett | |
| 1940-11-18 | The Rage of Manhattan | Tyrone Power, Annabella | |
| 1940-11-25 | Jezebel | Loretta Young, Brian Donlevy | |
| 1940-12-02 | Knute Rockne, All American | Pat O'Brien, Fay Wray | |
| 1940-12-09 | My Favorite Wife | Laurence Olivier, Rosalind Russell | |
| 1940-12-16 | Fifth Avenue Girl | Ginger Rogers, Edward Arnold | |
| 1940-12-23 | Young Tom Edison | Mickey Rooney, Virginia Weidler | |
| 1940-12-30 | A Little Bit of Heaven | Gloria Jean, C. Aubrey Smith | |

=== 1941 ===
1941
| First broadcast | Title | Starring | Notes |
|---|---|---|---|
| 1941-01-06 | Vivacious Lady | Alice Faye, Don Ameche | |
| 1941-01-13 | Libel | Ronald Colman, Otto Kruger | |
| 1941-01-20 | The Cowboy and the Lady | Merle Oberon, Gene Autry | |
| 1941-01-27 | Captain January | Shirley Temple, Gene Lockhart | |
| 1941-02-03 | Rebecca | Ronald Colman, Ida Lupino | |
| 1941-02-10 | The Moon's Our Home | Carole Lombard, James Stewart | |
| 1941-02-17 | Johnny Apollo | Dorothy Lamour, Burgess Meredith | |
| 1941-02-24 | The Whole Town's Talking | Fibber McGee and Molly | |
| 1941-03-03 | My Bill | Kay Francis, Warren William, Dix Davis | |
| 1941-03-10 | The Awful Truth | Constance Bennett, Bob Hope | |
| 1941-03-17 | Cheers for Miss Bishop | Martha Scott, William Gargan | |
| 1941-03-24 | Flight Command | Robert Taylor, Ruth Hussey | |
| 1941-03-31 | Stablemates | Mickey Rooney, Fay Wray | |
| 1941-04-07 | Stand-In | Joan Bennett, Warner Baxter | |
| 1941-04-14 | Dust Be My Destiny | John Garfield, Claire Trevor | |
| 1941-04-21 | The Letter | Bette Davis, Herbert Marshall | |
| 1941-04-28 | Wife, Husband and Friend | Priscilla Lane, George Brent | |
| 1941-05-05 | Kitty Foyle | Ginger Rogers, Dennis Morgan | |
| 1941-05-12 | Craig's Wife | Rosalind Russell, Herbert Marshall | |
| 1941-05-19 | Model Wife | Joan Blondell, Dick Powell | |
| 1941-05-26 | Virginia City | Errol Flynn, Martha Scott | |
| 1941-06-02 | They Drive by Night | Lana Turner, George Raft | |
| 1941-06-09 | Mr. & Mrs. Smith | Bob Hope, Carole Lombard | |
| 1941-06-16 | The Lady from Cheyenne | Loretta Young, Robert Preston | |
| 1941-06-23 | The Shop Around the Corner | Claudette Colbert, Don Ameche | |
| 1941-06-30 | I Love You Again | Myrna Loy, Cary Grant | |
| 1941-07-07 | Algiers | Hedy Lamarr, Charles Boyer | |
| 1941-09-08 | Tom, Dick and Harry | Ginger Rogers, Burgess Meredith | |
| 1941-09-15 | Lost Horizon | Ronald Colman, Donald Crisp | |
| 1941-09-22 | Lydia | Merle Oberon, Joseph Cotten | |
| 1941-09-29 | Third Finger, Left Hand | Douglas Fairbanks Jr., Martha Scott | |
| 1941-10-06 | Unfinished Business | Irene Dunne, Don Ameche | |
| 1941-10-13 | Buck Privates | Bud Abbott, Lou Costello | |
| 1941-10-20 | Blood and Sand | Tyrone Power, Annabella | |
| 1941-10-27 | Her First Beau | Jackie Cooper, Jane Withers | |
| 1941-11-03 | Hired Wife | William Powell, Myrna Loy | |
| 1941-11-10 | Hold Back the Dawn | Paulette Goddard, Susan Hayward | |
| 1941-11-17 | Merton of the Movies | Mickey Rooney, Judy Garland | |
| 1941-11-24 | Maisie Was a Lady | Ann Sothern, Lew Ayres | |
| 1941-12-01 | Man's Castle | Spencer Tracy, Ingrid Bergman | |
| 1941-12-08 | The Doctor Takes a Wife | Melvyn Douglas, Virginia Bruce | |
| 1941-12-15 | All This, and Heaven Too | Charles Boyer, Bette Davis | |
| 1941-12-22 | Remember the Night | Fred MacMurray, Jean Arthur | |
| 1941-12-29 | The Bride Came C.O.D. | Bob Hope, Hedy Lamarr | |

=== 1942 ===
1942
| First broadcast | Title | Starring | Notes |
|---|---|---|---|
| 1942-01-05 | Smilin' Through | Jeanette MacDonald, Ann E. Todd | |
| 1942-01-12 | A Tale of Two Cities | Ronald Colman, Edna Best | |
| 1942-01-19 | The Devil and Miss Jones | Lana Turner, Lionel Barrymore | |
| 1942-01-26 | Here Comes Mr. Jordan | Cary Grant, Claude Rains | |
| 1942-02-02 | Skylark | Claudette Colbert, Ray Milland | |
| 1942-02-09 | City for Conquest | Alice Faye, Robert Preston | |
| 1942-02-16 | Blossoms in the Dust | Greer Garson, Walter Pidgeon | |
| 1942-02-23 | Appointment for Love | Charles Boyer, Myrna Loy | |
| 1942-03-02 | The Great Lie | Loretta Young, Mary Astor | |
| 1942-03-09 | The Lady Eve | Barbara Stanwyck, Ray Milland | |
| 1942-03-16 | Manpower | Marlene Dietrich, Edward G. Robinson | |
| 1942-03-23 | Strawberry Blonde | Don Ameche, Rita Hayworth | |
| 1942-03-30 | I Wanted Wings | Ray Milland, Veronica Lake | |
| 1942-04-06 | The Fighting 69th | Pat O'Brien, Robert Preston | |
| 1942-04-13 | North West Mounted Police | Gary Cooper, Paulette Goddard | |
| 1942-04-20 | One Foot in Heaven | Fredric March, Martha Scott | Episode is only 45 minutes long due to an important government broadcast on proposed upcoming price controls. |
| 1942-04-27 | Penny Serenade | Robert Taylor, Barbara Stanwyck | |
| 1942-05-04 | Suspicion | Joan Fontaine, Brian Aherne | |
| 1942-05-11 | The Last of Mrs. Cheyney | Norma Shearer, Walter Pidgeon | |
| 1942-05-18 | A Man to Remember | Lionel Barrymore, Anita Louise | |
| 1942-05-25 | Test Pilot | Robert Taylor, Rita Hayworth | |
| 1942-06-01 | Ball of Fire | Barbara Stanwyck, Fred MacMurray | |
| 1942-06-08 | Arise, My Love | Loretta Young, Ray Milland | |
| 1942-06-15 | You Belong to Me | Merle Oberon, George Brent | |
| 1942-06-22 | Bedtime Story | Loretta Young, Don Ameche | |
| 1942-06-29 | The Champ | Wallace Beery, Josephine Hutchinson | |
| 1942-07-06 | Love Affair | Charles Boyer, Irene Dunne | |
| 1942-07-13 | H. M. Pulham, Esq. | Hedy Lamarr, Robert Young | |
| 1942-07-20 | The Philadelphia Story | Cary Grant, Katharine Hepburn | |
| 1942-09-14 | This Above All | Tyrone Power, Barbara Stanwyck | |
| 1942-09-21 | How Green Was My Valley | Walter Pidgeon, Maureen O'Hara | |
| 1942-09-28 | The Magnificent Dope | Don Ameche, Henry Fonda | |
| 1942-10-05 | Love Crazy | William Powell, Hedy Lamarr | |
| 1942-10-12 | Morning Glory | Judy Garland, John Payne | |
| 1942-10-19 | My Favorite Blonde | Bob Hope, Virginia Bruce | |
| 1942-10-26 | Wake Island | Brian Donlevy, Robert Preston | |
| 1942-11-02 | A Woman's Face | Ida Lupino, Brian Aherne | |
| 1942-11-09 | Sullivan's Travels | Veronica Lake | |
| 1942-11-16 | To Mary with Love | Irene Dunne, Ray Milland | |
| 1942-11-23 | The Gay Sisters | Barbara Stanwyck, Robert Young | |
| 1942-11-30 | Broadway | George Raft, Lloyd Nolan | |
| 1942-12-07 | The War Against Mrs. Hadley | Fay Bainter, Edward Arnold | |
| 1942-12-14 | Algiers | Charles Boyer, Loretta Young | |
| 1942-12-21 | The Pied Piper | Frank Morgan, Roddy McDowall | |
| 1942-12-28 | A Star Is Born | Judy Garland, Walter Pidgeon | |

=== 1943 ===
1943
| First broadcast | Title | Starring | Notes |
|---|---|---|---|
| 1943-01-04 | The Bugle Sounds | Wallace Beery, Marjorie Rambeau | |
| 1943-01-11 | She Knew All the Answers | Joan Bennett, Preston Foster | |
| 1943-01-18 | My Gal Sal | Mary Martin, Dick Powell | |
| 1943-01-25 | This Gun for Hire | Alan Ladd, Joan Blondell | |
| 1943-02-01 | The Show-Off | Hal Peary | |
| 1943-02-08 | The Maltese Falcon | Edward G. Robinson, Gail Patrick | |
| 1943-02-15 | Are Husbands Necessary? | George Burns, Gracie Allen | |
| 1943-02-22 | This Is the Army | Over 200 soldiers participated in this episode | |
| 1943-03-01 | The Lady Is Willing | Kay Francis, George Brent | |
| 1943-03-08 | Reap the Wild Wind | Ray Milland, Paulette Goddard | |
| 1943-03-15 | Libel | Edna Best, Ronald Colman | |
| 1943-03-22 | Each Dawn I Die | George Raft, Franchot Tone | |
| 1943-03-29 | Crossroads | Lana Turner, Jean-Pierre Aumont | |
| 1943-04-05 | Road to Morocco | Bob Hope, Bing Crosby | |
| 1943-04-12 | Once Upon a Honeymoon | Claudette Colbert, Brian Aherne | |
| 1943-04-19 | A Night to Remember | Ann Sothern, Robert Young | |
| 1943-04-26 | The Lady Has Plans | Rita Hayworth, William Powell | |
| 1943-05-03 | The Navy Comes Through | Pat O'Brien, George Murphy | |
| 1943-05-10 | Now, Voyager | Ida Lupino, Paul Henreid | |
| 1943-05-17 | The Talk of the Town | Ronald Colman, Cary Grant, Jean Arthur | |
| 1943-05-24 | Hitler's Children | Bonita Granville, Otto Kruger | |
| 1943-05-31 | The Major and the Minor | Ginger Rogers, Ray Milland | |
| 1943-06-07 | My Friend Flicka | Roddy McDowall, George Brent | |
| 1943-06-14 | The Philadelphia Story | Loretta Young, Robert Taylor | |
| 1943-06-21 | In Which We Serve | Ronald Colman, Edna Best | |
| 1943-06-28 | The Great Man's Lady | Barbara Stanwyck, Joseph Cotten, Chester Morris | |
| 1943-07-05 | My Sister Eileen | Rosalind Russell, Janet Blair | |
| 1943-07-12 | Air Force | George Raft, Harry Carey | |
| 1943-09-13 | Phantom of the Opera | Nelson Eddy, Susanna Foster | |
| 1943-09-20 | Flight for Freedom | Rosalind Russell, George Brent, Chester Morris | |
| 1943-09-27 | Ladies in Retirement | Ida Lupino, Brian Aherne | |
| 1943-10-04 | The Pride of the Yankees | Gary Cooper, Virginia Bruce | |
| 1943-10-11 | Heaven Can Wait | Don Ameche, Maureen O'Hara | |
| 1943-10-18 | Mr. Lucky | Cary Grant, Laraine Day | |
| 1943-10-25 | Slightly Dangerous | Lana Turner, Victor Mature | |
| 1943-11-01 | So Proudly We Hail! | Claudette Colbert, Veronica Lake, Paulette Goddard | |
| 1943-11-08 | Salute to the Marines | Fay Bainter, Wallace Beery, Keye Luke | |
| 1943-11-15 | Hello, Frisco, Hello | Alice Faye, Robert Young | |
| 1943-11-22 | China | Loretta Young, Alan Ladd | |
| 1943-11-29 | The Navy Comes Through | Pat O'Brien, Ruth Warrick, Chester Morris | |
| 1943-12-06 | Mrs. Miniver | Greer Garson, Walter Pidgeon | |
| 1943-12-13 | Five Graves to Cairo | Franchot Tone, Anne Baxter | |
| 1943-12-20 | Dixie | Bing Crosby, Dorothy Lamour | |
| 1943-12-27 | Kathleen | Shirley Temple, Herbert Marshall | |

=== 1944 ===
1944
| First broadcast | Title | Starring | Notes |
|---|---|---|---|
| 1944-01-03 | Shadow of a Doubt | William Powell, Teresa Wright | |
| 1944-01-10 | The Constant Nymph | Charles Boyer, Maureen O'Sullivan | |
| 1944-01-24 | Casablanca | Alan Ladd, Hedy Lamarr | |
| 1944-01-31 | Random Harvest | Ronald Colman, Greer Garson | |
| 1944-02-07 | His Butler's Sister | Deanna Durbin, Pat O'Brien | |
| 1944-02-14 | The Fallen Sparrow | Robert Young, Maureen O'Hara | |
| 1944-02-21 | Wake Up and Live | Frank Sinatra, Marilyn Maxwell | |
| 1944-02-28 | Guadalcanal Diary | Preston Foster, William Bendix | |
| 1944-03-06 | The Letter | Bette Davis, Herbert Marshall | |
| 1944-03-13 | In Old Oklahoma | Roy Rogers, Martha Scott | |
| 1944-03-20 | The Hard Way | Miriam Hopkins, Franchot Tone, Chester Morris | |
| 1944-03-27 | Phantom Lady | Brian Aherne, Ella Raines | |
| 1944-04-03 | Destroyer | Edward G. Robinson, Marguerite Chapman | |
| 1944-04-10 | Happy Land | Don Ameche, Frances Dee | |
| 1944-04-17 | Coney Island | Dorothy Lamour, Alan Ladd, Chester Morris | |
| 1944-04-24 | This Land is Mine | Charles Laughton, Maureen O'Sullivan | |
| 1944-05-01 | Appointment for Love | Paul Lukas, Olivia de Havilland | |
| 1944-05-08 | Penny Serenade | Irene Dunne, Joseph Cotten | |
| 1944-05-15 | Action in the North Atlantic | George Raft, Raymond Massey | |
| 1944-05-22 | Springtime in the Rockies | Betty Grable, Dick Powell, Carmen Miranda | |
| 1944-05-29 | Old Acquaintance | Alexis Smith, Miriam Hopkins | |
| 1944-06-05 | Jane Eyre | Loretta Young, Orson Welles | |
| 1944-06-12 | Naughty Marietta | Jeanette MacDonald, Nelson Eddy | |
| 1944-06-19 | Lost Angel | Margaret O'Brien, James Craig | |
| 1944-06-26 | Christmas in July | Dick Powell, Linda Darnell | |
| 1944-07-03 | It Happened Tomorrow | Don Ameche, Anne Baxter | |
| 1944-09-04 | Maytime | Jeanette MacDonald, Nelson Eddy | |
| 1944-09-11 | Break of Hearts | Orson Welles, Rita Hayworth | |
| 1944-09-18 | Suspicion | Olivia de Havilland, William Powell | |
| 1944-09-25 | Lucky Partners | Don Ameche, Lucille Ball | |
| 1944-10-02 | Home in Indiana | Walter Brennan, Charlotte Greenwood | |
| 1944-10-09 | In Old Chicago | Dorothy Lamour, Robert Young | |
| 1944-10-16 | Seventh Heaven | Jennifer Jones, Van Johnson | |
| 1944-10-23 | The Story of Dr. Wassell | Gary Cooper, Barbara Britton | |
| 1944-10-30 | Standing Room Only | Paulette Goddard, Fred MacMurray | |
| 1944-11-06 | The Pied Piper | Signe Hasso, Frank Morgan, Margaret O'Brien | |
| 1944-11-13 | Magnificent Obsession | Claudette Colbert, Don Ameche | |
| 1944-11-20 | It Started with Eve | Charles Laughton, Susanna Foster | |
| 1944-11-27 | Dark Waters | Merle Oberon, Preston Foster | |
| 1944-12-04 | The Unguarded Hour | Laraine Day, Robert Montgomery | |
| 1944-12-11 | Casanova Brown | Gary Cooper, Joan Bennett | |
| 1944-12-18 | Berkeley Square | Ronald Colman, Maureen O'Sullivan | |
| 1944-12-25 | Vagabond King | Dennis Morgan, Kathryn Grayson | |

=== 1945 ===
1945
| First broadcast | Title | Starring | Notes |
|---|---|---|---|
| 1945-01-01 | Bride by Mistake | Laraine Day, John Hodiak | |
| 1945-01-08 | I Never Left Home | Bob Hope, Frances Langford | |
| 1945-01-15 | The Master Race | George Coulouris, Nancy Gates | |
| 1945-01-22 | Tender Comrade | Olivia de Havilland, June Duprez | |
| 1945-01-29 | Lady in the Dark | Ginger Rogers, Ray Milland | |
| 1945-02-05 | Laura | Gene Tierney, Dana Andrews | |
| 1945-02-12 | For Whom the Bell Tolls | Gary Cooper, Ingrid Bergman | |
| 1945-02-19 | Sunday Dinner for a Soldier | Anne Baxter, John Hodiak | |
| 1945-02-26 | Bedtime Story | Cary Grant, Greer Garson | |
| 1945-03-05 | Disputed Passage | Alan Ladd, Ann Richards | |
| 1945-03-12 | The Devil and Miss Jones | Linda Darnell, Frank Morgan | |
| 1945-03-19 | Grissly's Millions | Pat O'Brien, Lynn Bari | |
| 1945-03-26 | A Tale of Two Cities | Orson Welles, Rosemary DeCamp | |
| 1945-04-02 | Swanee River | Al Jolson, Dennis Morgan | |
| 1945-04-09 | The Suspect | Charles Laughton, Ella Raines | |
| 1945-04-16 | Only Yesterday | Ida Lupino, Robert Young | |
| 1945-04-23 | The Petrified Forest | Ronald Colman, Susan Hayward | |
| 1945-04-30 | Moontide | Humphrey Bogart, Virginia Bruce | |
| 1945-05-07 | Sing You Sinners | Bing Crosby, Joan Caulfield | |
| 1945-05-14 | Alexander Graham Bell | Don Ameche, June Duprez | |
| 1945-05-21 | And Now Tomorrow | Alan Ladd, Loretta Young | |
| 1945-05-28 | Kentucky | Laraine Day, Walter Brennan | |
| 1945-06-04 | Intermezzo | Ingrid Bergman, Joseph Cotten | |
| 1945-06-11 | Murder, My Sweet | Dick Powell, Claire Trevor | |
| 1945-06-18 | The Canterville Ghost | Charles Laughton, Margaret O'Brien | |
| 1945-06-25 | The Woman in the Window | Joan Bennett | |
| 1945-08-27 | Practically Yours | Claudette Colbert, Ray Milland | |
| 1945-09-03 | The Enchanted Cottage | Dorothy McGuire, Robert Young | |
| 1945-09-10 | Experiment Perilous | Virginia Bruce | |
| 1945-09-17 | Christmas Holiday | Loretta Young, William Holden | |
| 1945-09-24 | It's a Date | Brian Aherne | |
| 1945-10-01 | Mr. Skeffington | Bette Davis | |
| 1945-10-08 | Roughly Speaking | Rosalind Russell, Jack Carson | |
| 1945-10-15 | A Medal for Benny | Dorothy Lamour | |
| 1945-10-22 | Lost Angel | Margaret O'Brien | |
| 1945-10-29 | The Affairs of Susan | Joan Fontaine, George Brent | |
| 1945-11-05 | Destry Rides Again | James Stewart, Joan Blondell | |
| 1945-11-12 | Guest in the House | Robert Young | |
| 1945-11-19 | The Keys of the Kingdom | Ronald Colman, Ann Harding | |
| 1945-11-26 | Salty O'Rourke | Alan Ladd, Marjorie Reynolds | |
| 1945-12-03 | Blood on the Sun | James Cagney, Sylvia Sidney | |
| 1945-12-10 | Guest Wife | Olivia de Havilland, Don Ameche | |
| 1945-12-17 | Made for Each Other | James Stewart, Marsha Hunt | |
| 1945-12-24 | I'll Be Seeing You | Joseph Cotten | |
| 1945-12-31 | Pride of the Marines | John Garfield, Dane Clark | |

=== 1946 ===
1946
| First broadcast | Title | Starring | Notes |
|---|---|---|---|
| 1946-01-07 | You Came Along | Van Johnson, Lizabeth Scott | |
| 1946-01-14 | The Valley of Decision | Gregory Peck, Greer Garson | |
| 1946-01-21 | Johnny Eager | Robert Taylor, Susan Peters | |
| 1946-01-28 | The Clock | Judy Garland, John Hodiak | |
| 1946-02-04 | This Love of Ours | Rita Hayworth, Charles Korvin | |
| 1946-02-11 | Now, Voyager | Bette Davis, Gregory Peck | |
| 1946-02-18 | Captain January | Margaret O'Brien, Lionel Barrymore | |
| 1946-02-25 | Thunderhead, Son of Flicka | Roddy McDowall | |
| 1946-03-04 | The Amazing Mrs. Holliday | Gene Tierney, Walter Brennan | |
| 1946-03-11 | Presenting Lily Mars | June Allyson, Van Heflin | |
| 1946-03-18 | A Tale of Two Cities | Ronald Colman, Heather Angel | |
| 1946-03-25 | Wonder Man | Danny Kaye, Virginia Mayo | |
| 1946-04-01 | Barnacle Bill | Wallace Beery, Marjorie Main | |
| 1946-04-08 | Honky Tonk | Lana Turner, John Hodiak | |
| 1946-04-15 | Whistle Stop | Alan Ladd, Evelyn Keyes | |
| 1946-04-22 | Love Letters | Joseph Cotten, Loretta Young | |
| 1946-04-29 | Gaslight | Ingrid Bergman, Charles Boyer | |
| 1946-05-06 | Tomorrow is Forever | Claudette Colbert, Van Heflin | |
| 1946-05-13 | Pardon My Past | Fred MacMurray, Marguerite Chapman | |
| 1946-05-20 | Deadline at Dawn | Joan Blondell, Paul Lukas | |
| 1946-05-27 | Music for Millions | Margaret O'Brien, José Iturbi | |
| 1946-06-03 | None but the Lonely Heart | Brian Aherne, Ethel Barrymore | |
| 1946-06-10 | And Now Tomorrow | Olivia de Havilland, John Lund | |
| 1946-06-17 | Fallen Angel | Linda Darnell, Maureen O'Hara | |
| 1946-06-24 | State Fair | Jeanne Crain, Dick Haymes | |
| 1946-08-26 | Without Reservations | Claudette Colbert, Robert Cummings | |
| 1946-09-02 | Our Vines Have Tender Grapes | Margaret O'Brien, James Craig | |
| 1946-09-09 | The Barretts of Wimpole Street | Loretta Young, Brian Aherne | |
| 1946-09-16 | Madame Curie | Greer Garson, Walter Pidgeon | |
| 1946-09-23 | Sentimental Journey | John Payne, Lynn Bari | |
| 1946-09-30 | Coney Island | Betty Grable, Victor Mature | |
| 1946-10-07 | Dragonwyck | Vincent Price, Gene Tierney | |
| 1946-10-14 | To Have and Have Not | Humphrey Bogart, Lauren Bacall | |
| 1946-10-21 | Miss Susie Slagle's | Joan Caulfield, William Holden | |
| 1946-10-28 | From This Day Forward | Joan Fontaine, Mark Stevens | |
| 1946-11-04 | I've Always Loved You | Joseph Cotten, Catherine McLeod | |
| 1946-11-11 | Gallant Journey | Glenn Ford, Janet Blair | |
| 1946-11-18 | O.S.S. | Alan Ladd, Veronica Lake | |
| 1946-11-25 | Mrs. Parkington | Greer Garson, Walter Pidgeon | |
| 1946-12-02 | Meet Me in St. Louis | Judy Garland, Margaret O'Brien | |
| 1946-12-09 | Together Again | Irene Dunne, Walter Pidgeon | |
| 1946-12-16 | Killer Cates | Jack Benny, Gail Patrick | |
| 1946-12-23 | Do You Love Me | Dick Haymes, Maureen O'Hara | |
| 1946-12-30 | Crack Up | Pat O'Brien, Lynn Bari | |

=== 1947 ===
1947
| First broadcast | Title | Starring | Notes |
|---|---|---|---|
| 1947-01-06 | Till the End of Time | Laraine Day, Robert Mitchum | |
| 1947-01-13 | The Green Years | Charles Coburn, Tom Drake | |
| 1947-01-20 | Anna and the King of Siam | Rex Harrison, Irene Dunne | |
| 1947-01-27 | Cluny Brown | Olivia de Havilland, Charles Boyer | |
| 1947-02-03 | National Velvet | Elizabeth Taylor, Mickey Rooney | |
| 1947-02-10 | Frenchman's Creek | Joan Fontaine, David Niven | |
| 1947-02-17 | Devotion | Jane Wyman, Virginia Bruce | |
| 1947-02-24 | Kitty | Paulette Goddard | |
| 1947-03-03 | Somewhere in the Night | John Hodiak, Lynn Bari | |
| 1947-03-10 | It's a Wonderful Life | James Stewart, Donna Reed | |
| 1947-03-17 | Leave Her to Heaven | Gene Tierney, Cornel Wilde | |
| 1947-03-24 | Smoky | Joel McCrea, Constance Moore | |
| 1947-03-31 | How Green Was My Valley | Donald Crisp, Maureen O'Sullivan | |
| 1947-04-07 | Alexander's Ragtime Band | Al Jolson, Dinah Shore | |
| 1947-04-14 | Monsieur Beaucaire | Bob Hope, Joan Caulfield | |
| 1947-04-21 | My Reputation | Barbara Stanwyck, George Brent | |
| 1947-04-28 | My Darling Clementine | Henry Fonda, Richard Conte | |
| 1947-05-05 | The Egg and I | Claudette Colbert, Fred MacMurray | |
| 1947-05-12 | Johnny O'Clock | Dick Powell, Lee J. Cobb | |
| 1947-05-19 | It Happened on 5th Avenue | Don DeFore, Gale Storm | |
| 1947-05-26 | Vacation from Marriage | Deborah Kerr, Van Heflin | |
| 1947-06-02 | The Jazz Singer | Al Jolson, Gail Patrick | |
| 1947-06-09 | One More Tomorrow | Jane Wyman, Dennis Morgan | |
| 1947-06-16 | The Other Love | Barbara Stanwyck, Richard Conte | |
| 1947-06-23 | Cynthia | Elizabeth Taylor, Mary Astor | |
| 1947-08-25 | A Stolen Life | Bette Davis, Glenn Ford | |
| 1947-09-01 | Three Wise Fools | Margaret O'Brien, Lionel Barrymore | |
| 1947-09-08 | Margie | Jeanne Crain, Glenn Langan | |
| 1947-09-15 | The Seventh Veil | Ida Lupino, Joseph Cotten | |
| 1947-09-22 | Two Years Before the Mast | Alan Ladd, Wanda Hendrix | |
| 1947-09-29 | The Web | Vincent Price, Ella Raines | |
| 1947-10-06 | Undercurrent | Katharine Hepburn, Robert Taylor | |
| 1947-10-13 | Great Expectations | Robert Cummings, Ann Blyth | |
| 1947-10-20 | 13 Rue Madeleine | Robert Montgomery, Vanessa Brown | |
| 1947-10-27 | Stairway to Heaven | Ray Milland | |
| 1947-11-03 | Singapore | Fred MacMurray, Ava Gardner | |
| 1947-11-10 | The Dark Corner | Lucille Ball, Mark Stevens | |
| 1947-11-17 | Nobody Lives Forever | Ronald Reagan, Jane Wyman | |
| 1947-11-24 | Saratoga Trunk | Ida Lupino, Zachary Scott | |
| 1947-12-01 | The Ghost and Mrs. Muir | Madeleine Carroll, Charles Boyer | |
| 1947-12-08 | Ride the Pink Horse | Robert Montgomery, Wanda Hendrix | |
| 1947-12-15 | Magic Town | James Stewart, Jane Wyman | |
| 1947-12-22 | Miracle on 34th Street | Maureen O'Hara, Edmund Gwenn | |
| 1947-12-29 | Anchors Aweigh | Frank Sinatra, Gene Kelly | |

=== 1948 ===
1948
| First broadcast | Title | Starring | Notes |
|---|---|---|---|
| 1948-01-05 | The Farmer's Daughter | Loretta Young, Joseph Cotten | Special Father's Day episode. |
| 1948-01-12 | Kiss of Death | Victor Mature, Coleen Gray | |
| 1948-01-19 | The Yearling | Gregory Peck, Jane Wyman | |
| 1948-01-26 | Notorious | Ingrid Bergman, Joseph Cotten | |
| 1948-02-02 | Mother Wore Tights | Betty Grable, Dan Dailey | |
| 1948-02-09 | Lady in the Lake | Robert Montgomery, Audrey Totter | |
| 1948-02-16 | The Jolson Story | Al Jolson, Evelyn Keyes | |
| 1948-02-23 | T-Men | Dennis O'Keefe, Gail Patrick | |
| 1948-03-01 | Bad Bascomb | Wallace Beery, Margaret O'Brien | |
| 1948-03-08 | Spellbound | Joseph Cotten, Alida Valli | |
| 1948-03-15 | Irish Eyes Are Smiling | Dick Haymes | |
| 1948-03-22 | A Woman's Vengeance | Charles Boyer, Ann Blyth | |
| 1948-03-29 | I Love You Again | William Powell, Ann Sothern | |
| 1948-04-05 | Daisy Kenyon | Ida Lupino, Dana Andrews | |
| 1948-04-12 | The Perfect Marriage | Ray Milland, Lizabeth Scott | |
| 1948-04-19 | Random Harvest | Ronald Colman, Greer Garson | |
| 1948-04-26 | Dear Ruth | Joan Caulfield, William Holden | |
| 1948-05-03 | Cloak and Dagger | Ronald Reagan, Lilli Palmer | |
| 1948-05-10 | Intrigue | George Raft, June Havoc | |
| 1948-05-17 | The Homestretch | Maureen O'Hara, Cornel Wilde | |
| 1948-05-24 | I Walk Alone | Burt Lancaster, Lizabeth Scott | |
| 1948-05-31 | The Miracle of the Bells | Frank Sinatra, Alida Valli | |
| 1948-06-07 | Relentless | Robert Young, Claire Trevor | |
| 1948-06-14 | Jane Eyre | Ingrid Bergman, Robert Montgomery | |
| 1948-06-28 | You Were Meant for Me | Dan Dailey, Donna Reed | |
| 1948-08-30 | I Remember Mama | Irene Dunne | |
| 1948-09-06 | Mr. Peabody and the Mermaid | William Powell | |
| 1948-09-13 | Another Part of the Forest | Walter Huston, Vincent Price | |
| 1948-09-20 | Gentleman's Agreement | Gregory Peck, Anne Baxter | |
| 1948-09-27 | Tap Roots | Van Heflin, Susan Hayward | |
| 1948-10-04 | Stallion Road | Ronald Reagan, Alexis Smith | |
| 1948-10-11 | Larceny | John Payne, Joan Caulfield | |
| 1948-10-18 | The Razor's Edge | Ida Lupino, Mark Stevens | |
| 1948-10-25 | The Secret Heart | Deborah Kerr, Walter Pidgeon | |
| 1948-11-08 | Pitfall | Dick Powell, Lizabeth Scott | |
| 1948-11-15 | Body and Soul | John Garfield, Jane Wyman | |
| 1948-11-22 | The Big Clock | Ray Milland, Maureen O'Sullivan | |
| 1948-11-29 | Brief Encounter | Greer Garson, Van Heflin | |
| 1948-12-06 | The Foxes of Harrow | Maureen O'Hara, John Hodiak | |
| 1948-12-13 | The Seventh Veil | Robert Montgomery, Ingrid Bergman | |
| 1948-12-20 | Miracle on 34th Street | Maureen O'Hara, Edmund Gwenn | |
| 1948-12-27 | The Luck of the Irish | Anne Baxter, Dana Andrews | |

=== 1949 ===
1949
| First broadcast | Title | Starring | Notes |
|---|---|---|---|
| 1949-01-03 | The Mating of Millie | Glenn Ford | |
| 1949-01-10 | The Velvet Touch | Rosalind Russell, Sydney Greenstreet | |
| 1949-01-17 | You Gotta Stay Happy | James Stewart, Joan Fontaine | |
| 1949-01-24 | High Barbaree | Van Johnson | |
| 1949-01-31 | The Street with No Name | Richard Widmark, Mark Stevens | |
| 1949-02-07 | Captain from Castile | Cornel Wilde, Jean Peters | |
| 1949-02-14 | Sitting Pretty | Clifton Webb, Maureen O'Hara | |
| 1949-02-21 | The Unafraid | Burt Lancaster, Joan Fontaine | |
| 1949-02-28 | Apartment for Peggy | Jeanne Crain, William Holden | |
| 1949-03-07 | Red River | John Wayne, Joanne Dru | |
| 1949-03-14 | What a Woman! | Rosalind Russell, Robert Cummings | |
| 1949-03-21 | That Wonderful Urge | Don Ameche, Gene Tierney | |
| 1949-03-28 | The Accused | Loretta Young, Robert Cummings | |
| 1949-04-04 | Family Honeymoon | Claudette Colbert, Fred MacMurray | |
| 1949-04-11 | The Song of Bernadette | Anne Baxter, Charles Bickford | |
| 1949-04-18 | The Treasure of the Sierra Madre | Humphrey Bogart, Walter Huston | |
| 1949-04-25 | When My Baby Smiles at Me | Betty Grable, Dan Dailey | |
| 1949-05-02 | Miss Tatlock's Millions | John Lund, Wanda Hendrix | |
| 1949-05-09 | The Paradine Case | Joseph Cotten, Alida Valli | |
| 1949-05-16 | April Showers | Jack Carson, Dorothy Lamour | |
| 1949-05-23 | To the Ends of the Earth | Dick Powell, Signe Hasso | |
| 1949-05-30 | Anna and the King of Siam | James Mason, Irene Dunne | |
| 1949-06-06 | Mildred Pierce | Rosalind Russell, Zachary Scott | |
| 1949-06-13 | The Bachelor and the Bobby-Soxer | Cary Grant, Shirley Temple | |
| 1949-06-20 | Merton of the Movies | Mickey Rooney, Arlene Dahl | |
| 1949-06-27 | Every Girl Should Be Married | Cary Grant, Betsy Drake | |
| 1949-08-29 | June Bride | Bette Davis, James Stewart | |
| 1949-09-05 | Saigon | John Lund, Lizabeth Scott | |
| 1949-09-12 | Deep Waters | Dana Andrews, Donna Reed | |
| 1949-09-19 | Green Dolphin Street | Lana Turner, Van Heflin | |
| 1949-09-26 | The Emperor Waltz | Bing Crosby, Ann Blyth | |
| 1949-10-03 | It Happens Every Spring | Ray Milland, Colleen Townsend | |
| 1949-10-10 | Mr. Blandings Builds His Dream House | Cary Grant, Irene Dunne | |
| 1949-10-17 | Mother Is a Freshman | Loretta Young, Van Johnson | |
| 1949-10-24 | Scudda Hoo! Scudda Hay! | June Haver, Lon McCallister | |
| 1949-10-31 | Portrait of Jennie | Joseph Cotten, Anne Baxter | |
| 1949-11-07 | High Wall | Van Heflin, Janet Leigh | |
| 1949-11-14 | Mother Wore Tights | Betty Grable, Dan Dailey | |
| 1949-11-21 | Sorrowful Jones | Bob Hope, Lucille Ball | |
| 1949-11-28 | Key Largo | Edward G. Robinson, Claire Trevor | |
| 1949-12-05 | Dear Ruth | William Holden, Joan Caulfield | |
| 1949-12-12 | The Street With No Name | Mark Stevens, Lloyd Nolan | |
| 1949-12-19 | The Bishop's Wife | Tyrone Power, David Niven | |
| 1949-12-26 | My Dream Is Yours | Jack Carson, June Haver | |

== Episodes: 1950–1955 ==
=== 1950 ===
1950
| First broadcast | Title | Starring | Notes |
|---|---|---|---|
| 1950-01-02 | To Each His Own | Olivia de Havilland, John Lund | |
| 1950-01-09 | Sorry, Wrong Number | Barbara Stanwyck, Burt Lancaster | |
| 1950-01-16 | Mr. Belvedere Goes to College | Clifton Webb, Coleen Gray | |
| 1950-01-23 | I'll Be Yours | William Bendix, Ann Blyth | |
| 1950-01-30 | California | Ray Milland, Lizabeth Scott | |
| 1950-02-06 | Red, Hot and Blue | Betty Hutton, John Lund | |
| 1950-02-13 | The Stratton Story | James Stewart, June Allyson | |
| 1950-02-20 | A Letter to Three Wives | Paul Douglas, Linda Darnell | |
| 1950-02-27 | Easy to Wed | Van Johnson, Esther Williams | |
| 1950-03-06 | Slattery's Hurricane | Maureen O'Hara, Richard Conte | |
| 1950-03-13 | Little Women | June Allyson, Margaret O'Brien | |
| 1950-03-20 | Father Was a Fullback | Paul Douglas, Maureen O'Hara | |
| 1950-03-27 | The Man Who Came to Dinner | Clifton Webb, Lucille Ball | |
| 1950-04-03 | Come to the Stable | Loretta Young, Hugh Marlowe | |
| 1950-04-10 | The Snake Pit | Olivia de Havilland | |
| 1950-04-17 | Every Girl Should Be Married | Cary Grant, Betsy Drake | |
| 1950-04-24 | Mrs. Mike | Dick Powell, Gene Tierney | |
| 1950-05-01 | All My Sons | Edward Arnold, Burt Lancaster | |
| 1950-05-08 | The Life of Riley | William Bendix, Rosemary DeCamp | |
| 1950-05-15 | The Lady Takes a Sailor | Jane Wyman, Dennis Morgan | |
| 1950-05-22 | Jolson Sings Again | Al Jolson, Barbara Hale | |
| 1950-05-29 | Night Song | Dana Andrews, Joan Fontaine | |
| 1950-06-05 | Bride for Sale | Claudette Colbert, Robert Young | |
| 1950-06-12 | The Corn Is Green | Olivia de Havilland, Richard Basehart | |
| 1950-06-19 | John Loves Mary | Patricia Neal, Ronald Reagan | |
| 1950-06-26 | The Bride Goes Wild | June Allyson, Van Johnson | |
| 1950-08-28 | My Foolish Heart | Susan Hayward, Dana Andrews | |
| 1950-09-04 | One Sunday Afternoon | Dennis Morgan, Patricia Neal | |
| 1950-09-11 | The Heiress | Olivia de Havilland, Van Heflin | |
| 1950-09-18 | Pinky | Jeanne Crain, Ethel Barrymore | |
| 1950-09-25 | Good Sam | Ann Sheridan, Joel McCrea | |
| 1950-10-02 | Flamingo Road | Jane Wyman | |
| 1950-10-09 | Love That Brute | Paul Douglas, Jean Peters | |
| 1950-10-16 | House of Strangers | Anne Baxter, Richard Conte | |
| 1950-10-23 | A Woman of Distinction | Rosalind Russell, Cary Grant | |
| 1950-10-30 | Double Indemnity | Barbara Stanwyck, Fred MacMurray | |
| 1950-11-06 | Rebecca | Laurence Olivier, Vivien Leigh | |
| 1950-11-13 | Wabash Avenue | Betty Grable, Victor Mature | |
| 1950-11-20 | Pretty Baby | Dennis Morgan, Betsy Drake | |
| 1950-11-27 | You're My Everything | Anne Baxter, Phil Harris | |
| 1950-12-04 | Apartment for Peggy | Jeanne Crain | |
| 1950-12-11 | B.F.'s Daughter | Barbara Stanwyck, Stewart Granger | |
| 1950-12-18 | Holiday Affair | Robert Mitchum, Laraine Day | |
| 1950-12-25 | The Wizard of Oz | Judy Garland | |

=== 1951 ===
1951
| First broadcast | Title | Starring | Notes |
|---|---|---|---|
| 1951-01-01 | The Barkleys of Broadway | Ginger Rogers, George Murphy | |
| 1951-01-08 | Once More, My Darling | Ann Blyth, Van Heflin | |
| 1951-01-15 | The Farmer's Daughter | Loretta Young, Joseph Cotten | |
| 1951-01-22 | Broken Arrow | Burt Lancaster, Debra Paget | |
| 1951-01-29 | Treasure Island | James Mason, Bobby Driscoll | |
| 1951-02-05 | Louisa | Ruth Hussey, Ronald Reagan | |
| 1951-02-12 | Battleground | Van Johnson, John Hodiak | |
| 1951-02-19 | Dear Wife | William Holden, Joan Caulfield | |
| 1951-02-26 | When Johnny Comes Marching Home | James Stewart, Joanne Dru | |
| 1951-03-05 | Panic in the Streets | Richard Widmark, Paul Douglas | |
| 1951-03-12 | She Wore a Yellow Ribbon | John Wayne, Mel Ferrer | |
| 1951-03-19 | The Red Danube | Walter Pidgeon, Peter Lawford | |
| 1951-03-26 | Seventh Heaven | Janet Gaynor, Charles Farrell | |
| 1951-04-02 | Where the Sidewalk Ends | Dana Andrews, Anne Baxter | |
| 1951-04-09 | The Third Man | Joseph Cotten, Evelyn Keyes | |
| 1951-04-16 | Oh, You Beautiful Doll | Joan Caulfield, Bob Crosby | |
| 1951-04-23 | Family Honeymoon | Claudette Colbert, Fred MacMurray | |
| 1951-04-30 | Down to the Sea in Ships | Lionel Barrymore, Richard Widmark | |
| 1951-05-07 | Cheaper by the Dozen | Clifton Webb, Rhoda Williams | |
| 1951-05-14 | Brief Encounter | Olivia de Havilland, Richard Basehart | |
| 1951-05-21 | Love Letters | Loretta Young, William Holden | |
| 1951-05-28 | Bright Leaf | Gregory Peck, Virginia Mayo | |
| 1951-06-04 | A Ticket to Tomahawk | Anne Baxter, Dan Dailey | |
| 1951-06-11 | Our Very Own | Farley Granger, Diana Lynn | |
| 1951-06-18 | Edward, My Son | Walter Pidgeon, Deborah Kerr | |
| 1951-06-25 | The Reformer and the Redhead | June Allyson, Dick Powell | |
| 1951-08-27 | The Mudlark | Irene Dunne, Cedric Hardwicke | |
| 1951-09-03 | Payment on Demand | Bette Davis, Barry Sullivan | |
| 1951-09-10 | Fancy Pants | Bob Hope, Lucille Ball | |
| 1951-09-17 | Sunset Boulevard | Gloria Swanson, William Holden | |
| 1951-09-24 | MOVIETIME, USA | 50th Anniversary of Motion Pictures | |
| 1951-10-01 | All About Eve | Bette Davis, Gary Merrill | |
| 1951-10-08 | Borderline | Claire Trevor, John Hodiak | |
| 1951-10-15 | Mister 880 | Dana Andrews, Edmund Gwenn | |
| 1951-10-22 | Margie | Jeanne Crain, Hugh Marlowe | |
| 1951-10-29 | I'd Climb the Highest Mountain | Susan Hayward, William Lundigan | |
| 1951-11-05 | That Forsyte Woman | Greer Garson, Walter Pidgeon | |
| 1951-11-12 | Winchester '73 | James Stewart, Stephen McNally | |
| 1951-11-19 | Samson and Delilah | Hedy Lamarr, Victor Mature | |
| 1951-11-26 | To Please a Lady | Donna Reed, Adolphe Menjou | |
| 1951-12-03 | Strangers on a Train | Ray Milland, Ruth Roman | |
| 1951-12-10 | The Lemon Drop Kid | Bob Hope, Marilyn Maxwell | |
| 1951-12-17 | The Men | William Holden, Teresa Wright | |
| 1951-12-24 | Alice in Wonderland | Kathryn Beaumont, Jerry Colonna | |
| 1951-12-31 | Bird of Paradise | Louis Jourdan, Debra Paget | |

=== 1952 ===
1952
| First broadcast | Title | Starring | Notes |
|---|---|---|---|
| 1952-01-07 | Duchess of Idaho | Esther Williams, Van Johnson | |
| 1952-01-14 | Goodbye, My Fancy | Barbara Stanwyck, Robert Young | |
| 1952-01-21 | Captain Horatio Hornblower | Gregory Peck, Virginia Mayo | |
| 1952-01-28 | Branded | Burt Lancaster, Nancy Gates | |
| 1952-02-04 | Take Care of My Little Girl | Jeanne Crain, Dale Robertson | |
| 1952-02-11 | Show Boat | Ava Gardner, Howard Keel | |
| 1952-02-18 | Kim | Errol Flynn, Dean Stockwell | |
| 1952-02-25 | My Blue Heaven | Betty Grable, Dan Dailey | |
| 1952-03-03 | Young Man with a Horn | Kirk Douglas, Jo Stafford | |
| 1952-03-10 | Follow the Sun | Anne Baxter | |
| 1952-03-17 | Top o' the Morning | Barry Fitzgerald, Ann Blyth | |
| 1952-03-24 | Come to the Stable | Loretta Young | |
| 1952-03-31 | I Can Get It for You Wholesale | Susan Hayward, Dan Dailey | |
| 1952-04-07 | Union Station | William Holden, Nancy Olson | |
| 1952-04-14 | Royal Wedding | Jane Powell, George Murphy | |
| 1952-04-21 | Crisis | Robert Taylor | |
| 1952-04-28 | No Highway in the Sky | James Stewart, Marlene Dietrich | |
| 1952-05-05 | On Moonlight Bay | Gordon MacRae, Jane Wyman | |
| 1952-05-12 | Riding High | Rhonda Fleming, Fred MacMurray | |
| 1952-05-19 | The Magnificent Yankee | Ann Harding, Louis Calhern | |
| 1952-05-26 | Room for One More | Cary Grant, Phyllis Thaxter | |
| 1952-09-08 | Two Weeks with Love | Jane Powell, Ricardo Montalbán | |
| 1952-09-15 | Here Comes the Groom | Jane Wyman, Fred MacMurray | |
| 1952-09-22 | I'll Never Forget You | Tyrone Power, Debra Paget | |
| 1952-09-29 | Adam and Evalyn | Stewart Granger, Jean Simmons | Known as Adam and Evelyne in Britain, but this adaptation used the U.S.-released title of Adam and Evalyn |
| 1952-10-06 | The Model and the Marriage Broker | Jeanne Crain, Thelma Ritter | |
| 1952-10-13 | 5 Fingers | James Mason, Pamela Mason | |
| 1952-10-20 | My Six Convicts | Dana Andrews | |
| 1952-10-27 | My Son John | Fay Bainter, John Lund | |
| 1952-11-03 | Viva Zapata! | Charlton Heston, Jean Peters | |
| 1952-11-10 | Grounds for Marriage | Van Johnson, Kathryn Grayson | |
| 1952-11-17 | Submarine Command | William Holden | |
| 1952-11-24 | The Blue Veil | Jane Wyman, William Conrad | |
| 1952-12-01 | King Solomon's Mines | Deborah Kerr, Stewart Granger | |
| 1952-12-08 | Strictly Dishonorable | Janet Leigh | |
| 1952-12-15 | The African Queen | Humphrey Bogart, Greer Garson | |
| 1952-12-22 | Les Misérables | Ronald Colman, Debra Paget | |
| 1952-12-29 | Westward the Women | Robert Taylor | |

=== 1953 ===
1953
| First broadcast | Title | Starring | Notes |
|---|---|---|---|
| 1953-01-05 | Phone Call from a Stranger | Shelley Winters, Gary Merrill | |
| 1953-01-12 | The Story of Will Rogers | Jane Wyman, Will Rogers Jr. | |
| 1953-01-19 | Appointment with Danger | William Holden, Coleen Gray | |
| 1953-01-26 | September Affair | Joseph Cotten, Joan Fontaine | |
| 1953-02-02 | Captain Carey, U.S.A. | Charlton Heston, Wanda Hendrix | |
| 1953-02-09 | With a Song in My Heart | Susan Hayward, Thelma Ritter | |
| 1953-02-16 | Lady in the Dark | Judy Garland, John Lund | |
| 1953-02-23 | You're My Everything | Jeanne Crain, Dan Dailey | |
| 1953-03-02 | Close to My Heart | Ray Milland | |
| 1953-03-09 | The People Against O'Hara | Walter Pidgeon, Janet Leigh | |
| 1953-03-16 | This Woman Is Dangerous | Virginia Mayo, Dennis Morgan | |
| 1953-03-23 | Fourteen Hours | Paul Douglas | |
| 1953-03-30 | The Miracle of Our Lady of Fatima | Susan Whitney, J. Carrol Naish | |
| 1953-04-06 | Angels in the Outfield | Janet Leigh, George Murphy | |
| 1953-04-13 | Just for You | Jane Wyman, Dick Haymes | |
| 1953-04-20 | Deadline – U.S.A. | Dan Dailey, Debra Paget | |
| 1953-04-27 | Somebody Loves Me | Betty Hutton, Gene Barry | |
| 1953-05-04 | Wait till the Sun Shines, Nellie | Jean Peters, David Wayne | |
| 1953-05-11 | The Bishop's Wife | Cary Grant, Phyllis Thaxter | |
| 1953-05-18 | The Girl in White | June Allyson, Steve Forrest | |
| 1953-05-25 | Lure of the Wilderness | Jean Peters, Jeffrey Hunter | |
| 1953-09-07 | My Cousin Rachel | Olivia de Havilland, Ron Randell, Alma Lawton | |
| 1953-09-14 | The Steel Trap | Joseph Cotten | |
| 1953-09-21 | I Confess | Cary Grant, Phyllis Thaxter | |
| 1953-09-28 | The President's Lady | Charlton Heston, Joan Fontaine | |
| 1953-10-05 | Our Very Own | Terry Moore, Joan Evans | |
| 1953-10-12 | Breaking the Sound Barrier | Robert Newton, Dorothy McGuire | |
| 1953-10-19 | Taxi | Dan Dailey | |
| 1953-10-26 | Skirts Ahoy! | Esther Williams, Barry Sullivan | |
| 1953-11-02 | Because of You | June Allyson, Jeff Chandler | |
| 1953-11-09 | Thunder on the Hill | Claudette Colbert | |
| 1953-11-16 | It Grows on Trees | Ginger Rogers | |
| 1953-11-23 | The Browning Version | Ronald Colman | |
| 1953-11-30 | Undercurrent | Joan Fontaine, Mel Ferrer | |
| 1953-12-07 | Man on a Tightrope | Edward G. Robinson | |
| 1953-12-14 | Million Dollar Mermaid | Esther Williams, Walter Pidgeon | |
| 1953-12-21 | Peter Pan | Bobby Driscoll, Kathryn Beaumont | |
| 1953-12-28 | June Bride | Irene Dunne, Fred MacMurray | |

=== 1954 ===
1954
| First broadcast | Title | Starring | Notes |
|---|---|---|---|
| 1954-01-04 | The Day the Earth Stood Still | Michael Rennie, Jean Peters | |
| 1954-01-11 | Has Anybody Seen My Gal? | Gene Lockhart | |
| 1954-01-18 | The Winslow Boy | Ray Milland, Dorothy McGuire | |
| 1954-01-25 | People Will Talk | Jeanne Crain, Cary Grant | |
| 1954-02-01 | Laura | Gene Tierney, Victor Mature | |
| 1954-02-08 | The Third Man | Ray Milland, Ruth Roman | |
| 1954-02-15 | Trouble Along the Way | June Haver, Jack Carson | |
| 1954-02-22 | September Affair | Dana Andrews, Eleanor Parker | |
| 1954-03-01 | The Mississippi Gambler | Tyrone Power | |
| 1954-03-08 | The Glass Menagerie | Jane Wyman, Fay Bainter | |
| 1954-03-15 | Jeopardy | Barbara Stanwyck, Barry Sullivan | |
| 1954-03-22 | Carbine Williams | Ronald Reagan, Jean Hagen | |
| 1954-03-29 | A Blueprint for Murder | Dan Dailey, Dorothy McGuire | |
| 1954-04-05 | Welcome Stranger | Cary Grant, Barry Fitzgerald | |
| 1954-04-12 | Strangers on a Train | Virginia Mayo, Dana Andrews | |
| 1954-04-19 | The Star | Ida Lupino, Edmond O'Brien | |
| 1954-04-26 | Detective Story | Kirk Douglas, Eleanor Parker | |
| 1954-05-03 | Going My Way | Barry Fitzgerald | |
| 1954-05-10 | Holy Matrimony | Charles Laughton | |
| 1954-05-17 | The Corn Is Green | Claudette Colbert, Cameron Mitchell | |
| 1954-05-24 | The Model and the Marriage Broker | Jeanne Crain, Thelma Ritter | |
| 1954-05-31 | What a Woman! | Rosalind Russell, Robert Cummings | |
| 1954-06-07 | The Naked Jungle | Charlton Heston, Donna Reed | |
| 1954-06-14 | Mildred Pierce | Claire Trevor, Zachary Scott | |
| 1954-06-21 | Pickup on South Street | Terry Moore, Thelma Ritter | |
| 1954-06-28 | Goodbye, My Fancy | Rosalind Russell, Robert Young | |
| 1954-09-14 | Wuthering Heights | Merle Oberon, Cameron Mitchell | |
| 1954-09-21 | So Big | Ida Lupino, Robert Stack | |
| 1954-09-28 | How Green Was My Valley | Michael Rennie, Alexis Smith | |
| 1954-10-05 | The Turning Point | Fred MacMurray, Joanne Dru | |
| 1954-10-12 | Great Expectations | Rock Hudson, Barbara Rush | |
| 1954-10-19 | David and Bathsheba | Arlene Dahl, Michael Rennie | |
| 1954-10-26 | The Song of Bernadette | Ann Blyth, Charles Bickford | |
| 1954-11-02 | The Big Trees | Van Heflin | |
| 1954-11-09 | My Man Godfrey | Jeff Chandler, Julie Adams | |
| 1954-11-16 | Mother Didn't Tell Me | Dorothy McGuire, Frank Lovejoy | |
| 1954-11-23 | All About Eve | Ann Blyth, Claire Trevor | |
| 1954-11-30 | The Blue Gardenia | Dana Andrews | |
| 1954-12-07 | Battleground | Van Johnson, George Murphy | |
| 1954-12-14 | Secret of the Incas | Charlton Heston | |
| 1954-12-21 | Miracle on 34th Street | Edmund Gwenn | |
| 1954-12-28 | The Iron Mistress | Virginia Mayo, John Lund | |

=== 1955 ===
1955
| First broadcast | Title | Starring | Notes |
|---|---|---|---|
| 1955-01-04 | Mother Wore Tights | Dan Dailey, Mitzi Gaynor | |
| 1955-01-11 | Island in the Sky | Dick Powell | |
| 1955-01-18 | The Awful Truth | Cary Grant, Irene Dunne | |
| 1955-01-25 | Sangaree | Arlene Dahl | |
| 1955-02-01 | 5 Fingers | James Mason | |
| 1955-02-08 | The War of the Worlds | Dana Andrews, Pat Crowley | |
| 1955-02-15 | The Treasure of the Sierra Madre | Edmond O'Brien, Walter Brennan | |
| 1955-02-22 | Shane | Alan Ladd, Van Heflin | |
| 1955-03-01 | The Bishop's Wife | Cary Grant, Phyllis Thaxter | |
| 1955-03-08 | The Walls of Jericho | Cornel Wilde | |
| 1955-03-15 | Gentleman's Agreement | Ray Milland, Dorothy McGuire | |
| 1955-03-22 | Rawhide | Jeffrey Hunter, Donna Reed | |
| 1955-03-29 | Trouble Along the Way | Van Johnson, Joanne Dru | |
| 1955-04-05 | Come Fill the Cup | Van Heflin, Mona Freeman | |
| 1955-04-12 | Stairway to Heaven | David Niven, Barbara Rush | |
| 1955-04-19 | Forever Female | Ginger Rogers | |
| 1955-04-26 | The Story of Alexander Graham Bell | Robert Cummings | |
| 1955-05-03 | Elephant Walk | Joan Fontaine | |
| 1955-05-10 | Together Again | Maureen O'Hara | |
| 1955-05-17 | Little Boy Lost | Dick Powell | |
| 1955-05-24 | Now, Voyager | Dorothy McGuire | |
| 1955-05-31 | Rope of Sand | Barry Sullivan | |
| 1955-06-07 | Edward, My Son | Walter Pidgeon | |

== See also ==
- Lux Video Theatre
