= One More Tomorrow =

One More Tomorrow may refer to:

- One More Tomorrow (album), an album by Henry Gross
- One More Tomorrow (film), a 1946 American film
