= Kisses for Breakfast (film) =

1941 film by Lewis Seiler

- Directed by: Lewis Seiler
- Screenplay by: Kenneth Gamet; Walter DeLeon; Lynn Starling
- Based on: Mr. What's His Name; 1927 play by Seymour Hicks
- Produced by: Harlan Thompson
- Starring: Dennis Morgan; Jane Wyatt; Shirley Ross
- Cinematography: Arthur Edeson
- Edited by: James Gibbon
- Music by: Adolph Deutsch
- Production company: Warner Bros. Pictures
- Distributed by: Warner Bros. Pictures
- Release date: July 5, 1941
- Running time: 82 minutes
- Country: United States
- Language: English

Kisses for Breakfast is a 1941 American screwball comedy directed by Lewis Seiler and starring Dennis Morgan, Jane Wyatt and Shirley Ross. The film is a remake of the 1930 pre-Code comedy The Matrimonial Bed, which was produced by Warner Bros. Pictures from an English stage play adaptation by Seymour Hicks (Mr. What's His Name) of a French comic farce, Au Premier de Ces Messieurs ("To the First Husband"), written by Yves Mirande and André Mouëzy-Éon.

== Plot ==
Fickle Juliet Marsden (Shirley Ross) breaks off her engagement to Lucius Lorimer (Jerome Cowan) for the third time to marry handsome singer and ladykiller Rodney Trask (Dennis Morgan). After the wedding, Juliet's Southern cousin, Laura Anders (Jane Wyatt), calls from South Carolina to apologize for not attending because of appendicitis. Juliet promises to visit Laura on her honeymoon and has Rodney write down the address.

Before the newlyweds can leave, Rodney is visited by a woman named Clara Raymond, who blackmails him over their past relationship. Juliet's friend, Betty Trent (Lee Patrick), sees them drive away in Rodney's car. Rodney refuses to pay and is hit over the head by Clara's accomplice and develops amnesia. The would-be blackmailers drive the car over a cliff, where it bursts into flames, and although no body is found, Rodney is believed to be dead.

Rodney, not knowing who he is, takes the name "Happy Homes" from an F.H.A. billboard he chances to see, finds Laura's address in his pocket, and travels to her cotton plantation in search of his true identity. Laura has no idea who he is, but Rodney talks her into hiring him to run the nearly bankrupt plantation.

A year passes and love develops between Happy and Laura. They marry, and before leaving on their honeymoon, make a surprise visit to Juliet. Family and friends (including Lucius) immediately recognize "Happy" as Rodney, but are not quite certain if he is really Rodney or just someone who looks like him. Laura and Happy are unaware of the true situation, and when the household concocts a series of delays to prevent the couple from proceeding on their honeymoon, conclude everyone is crazy. They decide to sneak out to Niagara Falls, but Juliet discovers the plan. She diverts fuel oil into the water pipes and drenches both in goo when they take showers.

Finally Happy is hypnotized by Juliet's psychiatrist uncle and recovers his memory, thinking it is the day of his first wedding. Lucius reveals the entire story to the innocent Laura. Refusing to admit defeat because she loves Happy, Laura hogties Juliet and locks her in the sabotaged shower. She confronts Rodney alone is his bedroom. She convinces him that she is the "Cousin Laura" that he spoke to on the phone and that a year has passed. Rodney realizes that he is married to both women. She also charms him into kissing her, and his latent feelings for her arise again. Juliet, covered in black oil, escapes the shower and finds Rodney kissing Laura, leading to a pillow fight over his affections that winds up with Juliet being tarred and feathered. Laura decides to leave for South Carolina. Rodney realizes that he loves Laura. He tricks her into bashing him over the head with an urn containing his supposed remains (buttons from his overcoat) and "becomes" Happy again. Juliet disgustedly concludes that he is a "chameleon" and gives him up.

== Cast ==
- Dennis Morgan as Rodney Trask/"Happy Homes"
- Jane Wyatt as Laura Anders
- Shirley Ross as Juliet Marsden
- Lee Patrick as Betty Trent
- Jerome Cowan as Lucius Lorimer
- Una O'Connor as Ellie
- Barnett Parker as Phillips
- Romaine Callender as Dr. George Burroughs
- Lucia Carroll as Clara Raymond
- Cornel Wilde as Chet Oakley
- Willie Best as Arnold
- Louise Beavers as Clotilda
- Clarence Muse as Old Jeff
