= Everett Freeman =

American screenwriter and film producer (1911–1991)

- Born: February 2, 1911; New York City, New York
- Died: January 24, 1991 (aged 79); Westwood, Los Angeles, California
- Occupation(s): Screenwriter, producer

Everett Freeman (February 2, 1911 – January 24, 1991) was an American screenwriter and producer. He died of kidney failure on January 24, 1991, in Westwood, Los Angeles, California at age 79.

From 1935 to 1970, Freeman's screenplay credits are:

- 1,000 Dollars a Minute
- Married Before Breakfast
- The Chaser
- You Can't Cheat an Honest Man
- Larceny, Inc.
- George Washington Slept Here
- Thank Your Lucky Stars
- The Princess and the Pirate
- It Happened on Fifth Avenue
- The Secret Life of Walter Mitty
- Lulu Belle
- Miss Grant Takes Richmond
- The Lady Takes a Sailor
- Pretty Baby
- Jim Thorpe – All-American
- Too Young to Kiss
- Million Dollar Mermaid
- Destination Gobi
- Kelly and Me
- My Man Godfrey
- Marjorie Morningstar
- The Glass Bottom Boat
- Where Were You When the Lights Went Out?
- The Maltese Bippy
- How Do I Love Thee?
