= Dennis Morgan =

American actor (1908–1994)

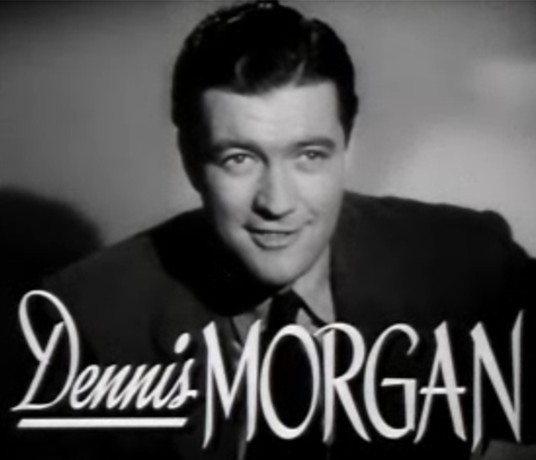
- in the trailer for the film The Hard Way (1943)
- Born: Earl Stanley Morner; December 20, 1908; Prentice, Wisconsin, U.S.
- Died: September 7, 1994 (aged 85); Fresno, California, U.S.
- Education: Carroll College
- Occupations: Actor; singer
- Years active: 1929–1980
- Spouse: Lillian Vedder (m. 1933)
- Children: 3

Dennis Morgan (born Earl Stanley Morner; December 20, 1908 – September 7, 1994) was an American actor and singer. He used the acting pseudonym Richard Stanley before adopting the name under which he gained his greatest fame.

According to one obituary, he was "a twinkly-eyed handsome charmer with a shy smile and a pleasant tenor voice in carefree and inconsequential Warner Bros musicals of the forties, accompanied by Jack Carson." Another said, "for all his undoubted star potential, Morgan was perhaps cast once too often as the likeable, clean-cut, easy-going but essentially uncharismatic young man who typically loses his girl to someone more sexually magnetic." David Shipman said he "was comfortable, good-looking, well-mannered: the antithesis of the gritty Bogart."

== Life and career ==
=== Early life ===
Morgan was born in the village of Prentice in Price County, in northern Wisconsin, the son of Grace J. (née Vandusen) and Frank Edward Morner. He was of Swedish descent on his father's side.

He graduated from Marshfield Senior High in Marshfield WI. He enrolled at Carroll College in Waukesha, Wisconsin, as a member of the 1930 graduating class. He was awarded the Carroll College Distinguished Alumnus Award in 1983.

=== Early career ===
He joined a troupe of performers at the State Lake Theatre in Chicago, and toured the midwest in Faust. He landed a job as a featured singer in the Empire Room of the famous Palmer House hotel in Chicago. He remained in Chicago as a radio announcer at the NBC Radio affiliate in Milwaukee, and went on to broadcast Green Bay Packers football games.

=== Stanley Morner at MGM ===
In 1936, after relocating to Los Angeles, Morgan began appearing in films. He signed a contract with MGM as "Stanley Morner". Unbilled, he lip synced for Allan Jones singing the Irving Berlin song, A Pretty Girl is Like a Melody, in The Great Ziegfeld (1936).

He was billed as "Stanley Morner" in Suzy (1936) and could be seen in Piccadilly Jim (1936), and Old Hutch (1936). He was given supporting roles in Mama Steps Out (1937) and Song of the City (1937) but went back to small parts in Navy Blue and Gold (1937).

=== Leading man ===
Independent producer-director Victor Halperin gave the actor his first leading role (under his given name of Stanley Morner) in I Conquer the Sea (1936). He then signed with Paramount, who billed him as "Richard Stanley". He was in Men with Wings (1938), King of Alcatraz (1938), Illegal Traffic (1938), and Persons in Hiding (1939).

=== Warner Bros. ===
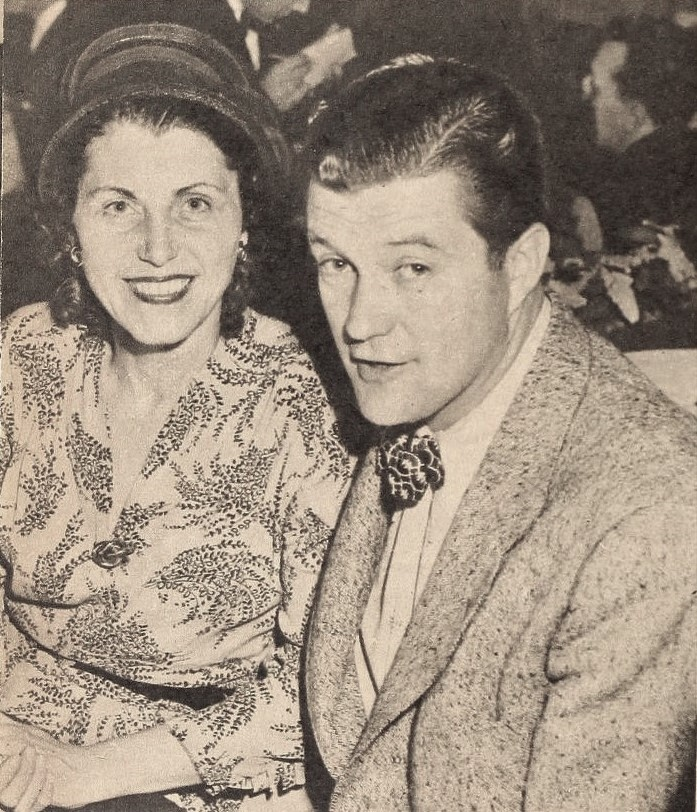
Dennis Morgan and his wife Lillian Vedder at Ciro's, 1946

He went over to Warner Bros. who billed him as "Dennis Morgan". According to Shipman the studio "put him on the assembly-line with Wayne Morris, Arthur Kennedy, Jeffrey Lynn, Eddie Albert, and Ronald Reagan – likeable young lugs squiring the heroine till Bogart, Cagney, or Flynn came crashing down to sweep her up."

He was given the lead in a B picture, Waterfront (1939), followed by No Place to Go (1939) and The Return of Doctor X (1939) with Humphrey Bogart.

Morgan was promoted to "A" films with The Fighting 69th (1940), supporting James Cagney and Pat O'Brien. He supported Priscilla Lane in Three Cheers for the Irish (1940) and went back to "B"s for Tear Gas Squad (1940), Flight Angels (1940), and River's End (1940).

Morgan's career received a boost when RKO borrowed him to play Ginger Rogers's love interest in Kitty Foyle (1940), a big hit.

Warners put him in some comedies, Affectionately Yours (1941) and Kisses for Breakfast (1941), then a Western, Bad Men of Missouri (1941). He supported Cagney again in Captains of the Clouds (1942) and Bette Davis and Olivia de Havilland in In This Our Life (1942).

Morgan co-starred with Ann Sheridan in Wings for the Eagle (1942) and Ida Lupino in The Hard Way (1943). He had the lead in some big Warners musicals: Thank Your Lucky Stars (1943), full of cameos from Warner stars; The Desert Song (1943); Shine On, Harvest Moon (1944), with Sheridan. The latter also featured Jack Carson in a key role. He and Morgan were in The Hard Way together and would go on to be a notable team.

Morgan was in The Very Thought of You (1944) and cameoed in Hollywood Canteen (1944). He had the lead in God Is My Co-Pilot (1945) and Christmas in Connecticut (1945) with Barbara Stanwyck.

=== Teamed with Jack Carson ===
Morgan was teamed with fellow Wisconsinite Jack Carson in One More Tomorrow (1946). Warners liked them as a combination, seeing them as similar to Bing Crosby and Bob Hope at Paramount. In the words of Shipman, the films would feature "Morgan as the easy-going singer who always got the girl and Carson as the loud-mouthed but cowardly braggart-comic who was given the air. No one thought they were Hope and Crosby, least of all themselves." They were reunited in Two Guys from Milwaukee (1946) and The Time, the Place and the Girl (1946).

Without Carson, Morgan made a Western, Cheyenne (1946), a musical My Wild Irish Rose (1947), and To the Victor (1948). In 1947, he was voted Singer of the Year.

He was back with Carson for Two Guys from Texas (1948) then made One Sunday Afternoon (1948) with Janis Paige. He and Carson were in It's a Great Feeling (1949) with Doris Day. Exhibitors voted him the 21st most popular star in the US for 1948.

Morgan made The Lady Takes a Sailor (1949) then Perfect Strangers (1950) with Rogers and Pretty Baby (1950) with Betsy Drake. He made a Western Raton Pass (1950), and a musical Painting the Clouds with Sunshine (1951). He supported Joan Crawford in This Woman Is Dangerous (1952).

Jack L. Warner wanted to terminate Dennis Morgan's expensive contract with Warner Bros., and assigned Morgan to Cattle Town (1952), a quickie western to be produced by B-movie specialist Bryan Foy. The director was silent-era veteran Noel M. Smith, known as a fast-and-cheap director who staged reckless action scenes. Jack Warner was certain that Morgan would refuse the strenuous assignment and break the contract, but Morgan refused to forfeit his salary. He reported for work as scheduled, made the film for Smith, and collected his customary salary. After that his contract with Warners ended. Morgan later said, "My mistake was, I stayed at one studio too long. Another mistake: I turned down early television, believing then... that people should pay to see us."

=== Later career ===
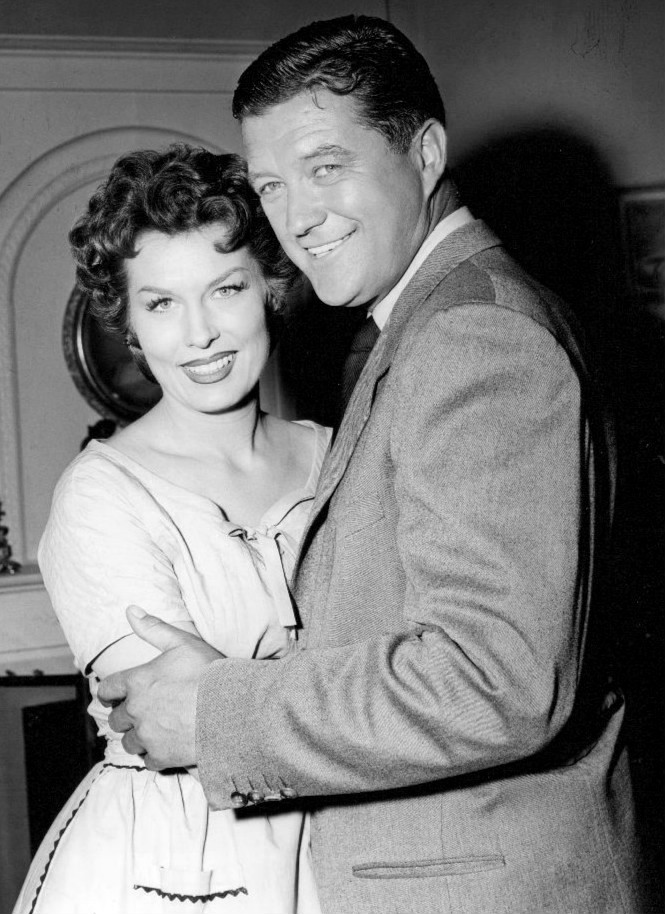
Jean Willes and Morgan (1955)

He appeared in sporadic television guest roles in the 1950s, including the ABC religion anthology series, Crossroads, in the 1955 episode "The Gambler" and as Senator-designate Fairchild in an episode of the dramatic anthology series Stage 7, titled "Press Conference" in 1955.

Morgan made films for Columbia's low-budget producer Sam Katzman, The Gun That Won the West (1955) and Uranium Boom (1956) and went to RKO for Pearl of the South Pacific (1956). He was cast as Dennis O'Finn in the 1958 episode "Bull in a China Shop" on Alfred Hitchcock Presents. In 1959, Morgan appeared as a regular, Dennis Chase, in eleven episodes of the crime drama, 21 Beacon Street, with Joanna Barnes and Brian Kelly.

=== Semi-retirement ===
By 1956, he had retired from films but still made occasional appearances on television, such as the role of Chad Hamilton in the 1962 episode "Source of Information" of the short-lived NBC newspaper drama series, Saints and Sinners. In 1963, he portrayed Dr. Clay Maitland in "The Old Man and the City" on NBC's The Dick Powell Theater. He performed with the Milwaukee Symphony and on the summer stage circuit.

He returned to films with Rogue's Gallery (1967). In 1968, he was cast as Dennis Roberts in the episode "Bye, Bye, Doctor" of the CBS sitcom, Petticoat Junction, and he played a cameo as a Hollywood tour guide in the all-star comedy Won Ton Ton, the Dog Who Saved Hollywood in 1976. His final screen performance was on March 1, 1980, as Steve Brian in the episode "Another Time, Another Place/Doctor Who/Gopher's Engagement" of ABC's The Love Boat.

== Personal life ==
Morgan married Lillian Vedder in Marshfield, Wisconsin, on September 7, 1933. The couple had three children: Stanley Morner Jr., Krista Kennedy, and Jim Morner. After his retirement as an actor in the late 1960s, Morgan became a rancher in Madera County, California.

On January 21, 1983, Morgan and his wife Lillian were seriously injured in a car crash. The station wagon they were driving in drifted off Interstate 580 southwest of Tracy, California, went over a 50-foot embankment and burst into flames. The couple were pulled from the wreckage by passers-by; they suffered severe injuries and recovered in a nearby hospital.

Morgan was a staunch Republican and a member of the Sierra Vista Presbyterian Church in Oakhurst, California.

== Death ==
After being ill with heart problems for some time, Morgan died September 7, 1994, of respiratory failure in Fresno, California. Lillian died April 7, 2003.

== Filmography ==
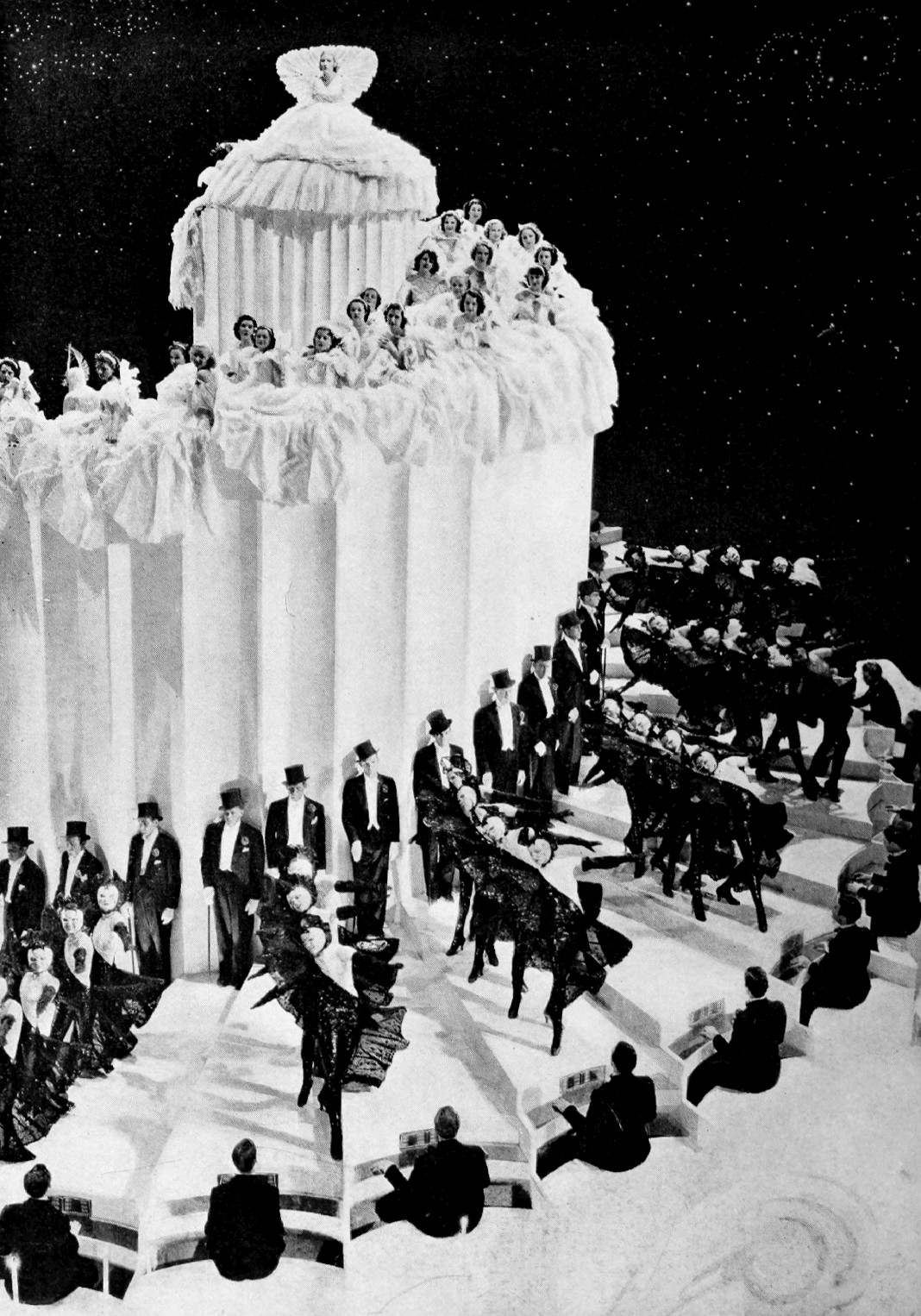
Morgan (billed as "Stanley Morner") appeared as the singing bridegroom in the famous "Wedding Cake" musical number in The Great Ziegfeld (1936), but the voice singing "A Pretty Girl Is Like a Melody" was that of MGM contract player Allan Jones.

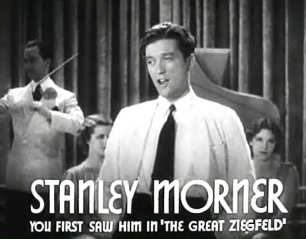
Morgan was billed under his given name "Stanley Morner" early in his career, such as in Mama Steps Out (1937)

=== Features ===
- Jealousy (1929) as Hugo (credited as Stanley Morner)
- True to the Navy (1930) as Bob Oldfield (credited as Stanley "Tiny" Morner)
- Anybody's Woman (1930) as Nick Stephenson (credited as Stan Morner)
- They Call It Sin (1932) as Gregory Russell (credited as Jack Morner)
- I Conquer the Sea! (1936) as Tommy Ashley
- The Great Ziegfeld (1936) as Stage Singer in 'Pretty Girl' Number (uncredited)
- Suzy (1936) as Lieutenant
- Piccadilly Jim (1936) as Chrystal Club Singer (uncredited)
- Old Hutch (1936) as Passerby at Fishing Lake (uncredited)
- Mama Steps Out (1937) as Chuck Thompson
- Song of the City (1937) as Tommy
- Navy Blue and Gold (1937) as Marine 2nd Lieutenant
- Men with Wings (1938) as Galton
- King of Alcatraz (1938) as First Mate Rogers
- Illegal Traffic (1938) as Cagey Miller
- Persons in Hiding (1939) as Mike Flagler
- Waterfront (1939) as James 'Jim' Dolen
- No Place to Go (1939) as Joe Plummer
- The Return of Doctor X (1939) as Michael Rhodes
- The Fighting 69th (1940) as Lieutenant Ames
- Three Cheers for the Irish (1940) as Angus Ferguson
- Tear Gas Squad (1940) as Tommy McCabe
- Flight Angels (1940) as Chick Farber
- River's End (1940) as John Keith / Sergeant Derry Conniston
- Kitty Foyle (1940) as Wyn Strafford
- Affectionately Yours (1941) as Richard 'Rickey' Mayberry
- Kisses for Breakfast (1941) as Rodney Trask
- Bad Men of Missouri (1941) as Cole Younger
- Captains of the Clouds (1942) as Johnny Dutton
- In This Our Life (1942) as Peter Kingsmill
- Wings for the Eagle (1942) as Corky Jones
- The Hard Way (1943) as Paul Collins
- Thank Your Lucky Stars (1943) as Tommy Randolph
- The Desert Song (1943) as Paul Hudson / El Khobar
- Shine On, Harvest Moon (1944) as Jack Norworth
- The Very Thought of You (1944) as Sergeant David Stewart
- Hollywood Canteen (1944) as himself
- God Is My Co-Pilot (1945) as Colonel Robert Lee Scott
- Christmas in Connecticut (1945) as Jefferson Jones
- One More Tomorrow (1946) as Thomas Rufus 'Tom' Collier III
- Two Guys from Milwaukee (1946) as Prince Henry
- The Time, the Place and the Girl (1946) as Steven Ross
- Cheyenne (1947) as James Wylie
- Always Together (1947) as The Bridegroom (uncredited)
- My Wild Irish Rose (1947) as Chauncey Olcott
- To the Victor (1948) as Paul Taggart
- Two Guys from Texas (1948) as Steve Carroll
- One Sunday Afternoon (1948) as Timothy L. 'Biff' Grimes
- It's a Great Feeling (1949) as Dennis Morgan
- The Lady Takes a Sailor (1949) as Bill Craig
- Perfect Strangers (1950) as David Campbell
- Pretty Baby (1950) as Sam Morley
- Raton Pass (1951) as Marc Challon
- Painting the Clouds with Sunshine (1951) as Vince Nichols
- This Woman Is Dangerous (1952) as Dr. Ben Halleck
- Cattle Town (1952) as Mike McGann (last film for Warner Bros.)
- Pearl of the South Pacific (1955) as Dan Merrill
- The Gun That Won the West (1955) as Jim Bridger
- Uranium Boom (1956) as Brad Collins
- Rogue's Gallery (1968) as Dr. Jonas Pettingill
- Busby Berkeley (1974) as himself (documentary)
- Won Ton Ton, the Dog Who Saved Hollywood (1976) as Tour Guide

=== Short subjects ===
- Annie Laurie (1936) as William Douglas
- Ride, Cowboy, Ride (1939) as Dinny Logan
- The Singing Dude (1940) as Rusty
- March On, Marines (1940) as Bob Lansing
- Stars on Horseback (1943) as himself (uncredited)
- The Shining Future (1944) as himself
- Road to Victory (1944) as himself (uncredited)
- I Am an American (1944) as himself (uncredited)
- Screen Snapshots: Hollywood Goes to Bat (1950) as himself

=== Selected television appearances ===
- Alfred Hitchcock Presents (1958) (Season 3 Episode 26: "Bull in a China Shop") as Detective Dennis O'Finn

== Radio ==
Year	Program	Episode/source
1941	Lux Radio Theatre	Kitty Foyle
1942	Cavalcade of America	Captains of the Clouds
1943	Cavalcade of America	Soldiers of the Tide
1943	Screen Guild Theater	Thank Your Lucky Stars
1944	Lux Radio Theatre	The Vagabond King
1945	Lux Radio Theatre	Swanee River
1945	Screen Guild Theater	The Desert Song
1946	The Jack Carson Show	June 26, 1946 episode (title unknown)
1946	The Jack Carson Show	Christmas Gift for Jack
1947	Lux Radio Theatre	One More Tomorrow
1947	Family Theater	Top Man
1948	Screen Guild Theater	Cheyenne
1949	Screen Guild Theater	One Sunday Afternoon
1950	Screen Guild Theater	The Shocking Miss Pilgrim
1950	Lux Radio Theatre	The Lady Takes a Sailor
1950	Lux Radio Theatre	One Sunday Afternoon
1950	Lux Radio Theatre	Pretty Baby
1951	Family Theater	Shadow on the Mountain
1951	The Martin and Lewis Show	The case of the battled bird watcher
1953	Lux Radio Theatre	This Woman Is Dangerous
1953	Family Theater	20,000 Leagues Under the Sea

== Legacy ==
=== Two Strike Park ===
Starting in 1946, Morgan championed the cause of children with nowhere to play. In 1949, as "honorary mayor" of La Crescenta, representing Two Strike Series, Inc., he "offered to donate five acres of land for the park if the County of Los Angeles would purchase two more adjoining acres to complete the initial parcel. In 1950, the Board of Supervisors responded with an additional 3.54 acres of parkland."

In 1958 Morgan spearheaded the drive to establish a new public park in La Crescenta in Los Angeles County. He raised funds for the park, at 5107 Rosemont Avenue, by "organizing exhibition baseball games featuring celebrity friends and professional athletes".

Morgan dedicated Two Strike Park on July 4, 1959, named for his belief that "a kid forced to play in the streets, with no place to play, already has two strikes against him".

=== Wisconsin Hall of fame ===
In 1983, Morgan, along with his film pal, Jack Carson, who had died in 1963, were inducted into the Wisconsin Performing Artists Hall of Fame.
