= Mama Steps Out =

1937 film by George B. Seitz

- Theatrical release poster
- Directed by: George B. Seitz
- Screenplay by: Anita Loos
- Based on: Ada Beats the Drum by John Alexander Kirkpatrick
- Produced by: John Emerson
- Starring: Guy Kibbee; Alice Brady; Betty Furness; Dennis Morgan; Gene Lockhart; Edward Norris
- Cinematography: Jackson Rose
- Edited by: George Boemler
- Music by: Edward Ward
- Production company: Metro-Goldwyn-Mayer
- Distributed by: Loew's Inc.
- Release date: February 5, 1937
- Running time: 65 minutes
- Country: United States
- Language: English

Mama Steps Out is a 1937 American comedy film directed by George B. Seitz and written by Anita Loos. The film stars Guy Kibbee, Alice Brady, Betty Furness, Dennis Morgan, Gene Lockhart, and Edward Norris. The film was released on February 5, 1937, by Metro-Goldwyn-Mayer.

== Plot ==
After inheriting a fortune, the Cuppy family of Fort Wayne, Indiana go to France to "broaden" their cultural outlook, although father Leonard (Guy Kibbee), a perfume manufacturer, and daughter Leila (Betty Furness) are not as enthusiastic as mother Ada (Alice Brady). On the way to France, Leila sees Chuck Thompson (Dennis Morgan), a singer on board their ship, whom she used to know, but he refuses to return her enthusiastic attempts to start a romance. Hoping to change his mind, Leila convinces her parents to take a villa in Antibes, where Chuck is appearing with Ferdie Fisher's band. Meanwhile, Ada is bored with staying at the villa and only meeting Americans. When a local priest (Frank Puglia) comes asking for money to save his church, Ada asks him to introduce her to some "cultural" Europeans.

== Cast ==
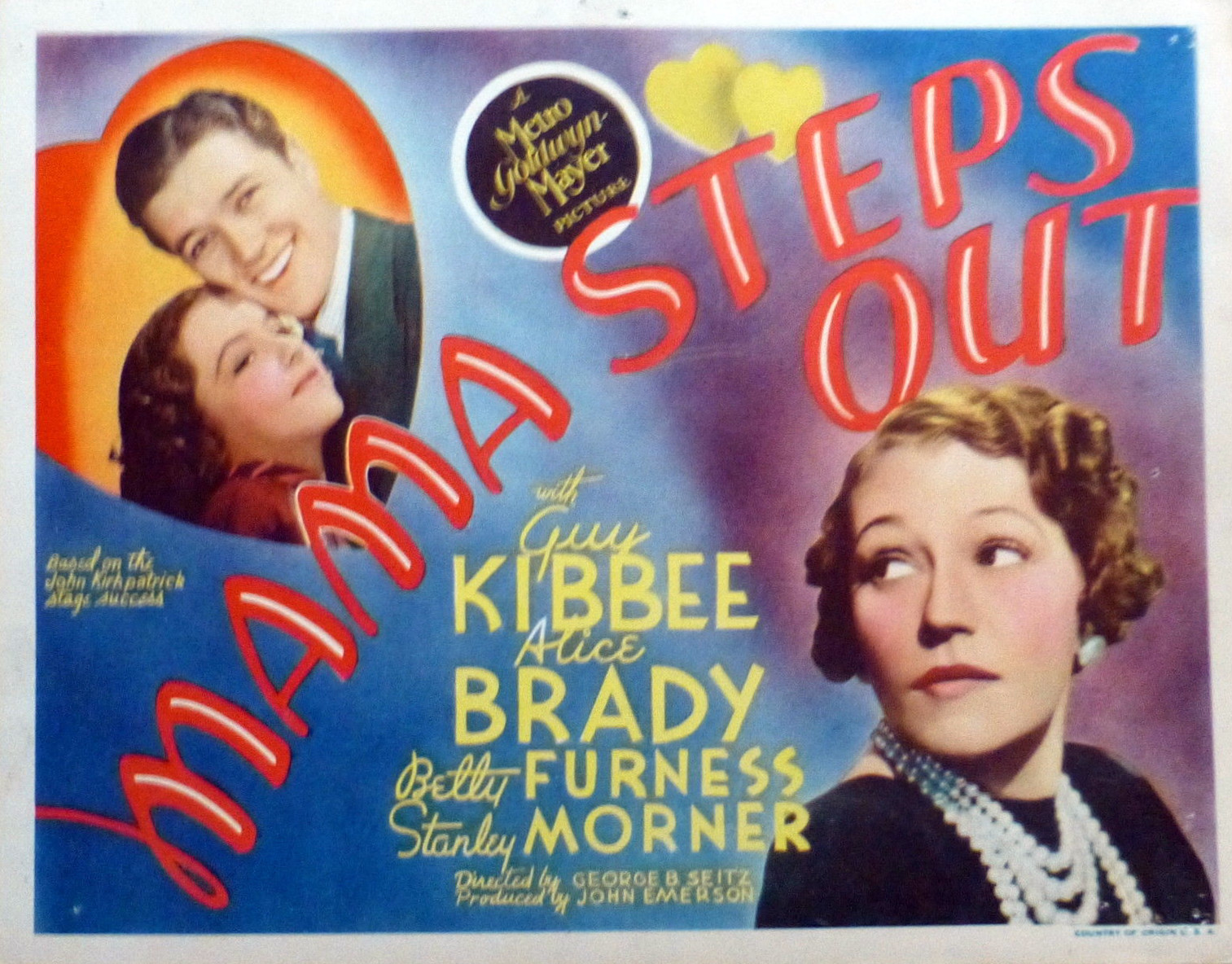

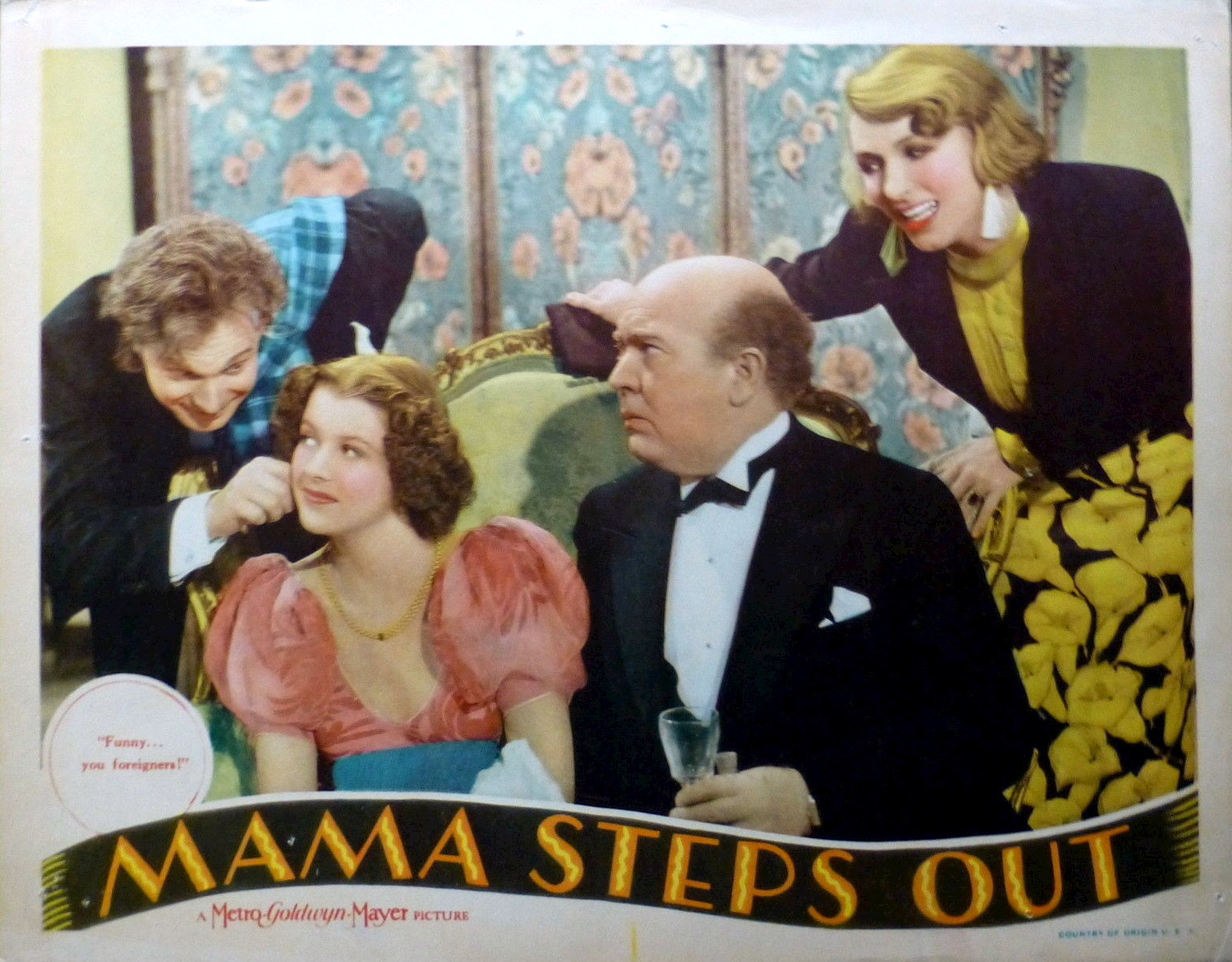

- Guy Kibbee as Leonard 'Len' Cuppy
- Alice Brady as Ada Cuppy
- Betty Furness as Leila Cuppy
- Dennis Morgan as Chuck Thompson
- Gene Lockhart as Mr. Sims
- Edward Norris as Ferdie Fisher
- Gregory Gaye as Dmitri 'Didi' Shekoladnikoff
- Ivan Lebedeff as Coco Duval
- Heather Thatcher as Nadine Wentworth
- Frank Puglia as Robert Dalderder
- Adrienne D'Ambricourt as Jeanne
