= One Sunday Afternoon (1948 film) =

1948 film by Raoul Walsh

- Janis Paige in the trailer for One Sunday Afternoon
- Directed by: Raoul Walsh
- Screenplay by: Robert L. Richards
- Based on: One Sunday Afternoon; 1933 play by James Hagan
- Produced by: Jerry Wald
- Starring: Dennis Morgan; Janis Paige; Dorothy Malone
- Cinematography: Wilfred M. Cline; Sidney Hickox
- Edited by: Christian Nyby
- Music by: Ralph Blane
- Color process: Technicolor
- Production company: Warner Bros. Pictures
- Distributed by: Warner Bros. Pictures
- Release dates: December 25, 1948 (New York City); January 1, 1949 (United States)
- Running time: 90 minutes
- Country: United States
- Language: English
- Budget: $2 million

One Sunday Afternoon is a 1948 American Technicolor musical comedy film directed by Raoul Walsh, and starring Dennis Morgan, Janis Paige and Dorothy Malone.

The film is based on James Hagan's play of the same name, which was produced on Broadway in 1933. This picture was the play's third film adaptation. The first, 1933 adaptation starred Gary Cooper. The second, also directed by Walsh, was The Strawberry Blonde (1941), starring James Cagney, Olivia de Havilland and Rita Hayworth. While the plot of the third adaptation is the same as the others, it does have a significant number of changes.

== Cast ==
- Dennis Morgan as Timothy L. "Biff" Grimes
- Janis Paige as Virginia Brush
- Don DeFore as Hugo Barnstead
- Dorothy Malone as Amy Lind
- Ben Blue as Nick
- Oscar O'Shea as Toby
- Alan Hale, Jr. as Marty
- Chester Conklin as Clerk (uncredited)

Cast notes

- Dorothy Malones' singing voice was provided by Marion Morgan.

== Production ==
This film is a musical remake of The Strawberry Blonde (1941), with some updates like an automobile for the first date instead of a horse and carriage. The tunes include "In My Merry Oldsmobile". Dennis Morgan stars in the leading role James Cagney had played in the earlier version, with Don DeFore in the role of the pseudo-friend previously played by Jack Carson.

== Radio adaptation ==
One Sunday Afternoon was presented on Philip Morris Playhouse February 24, 1952. The thirty-minute adaptation starred Hume Cronyn and Southern Methodist University student Ann Wedgeworth.
