= Pretty Baby (1950 film) =

1950 film by Bretaigne Windust

- Film poster
- Directed by: Bretaigne Windust
- Screenplay by: Everett Freeman; Harry Kurnitz
- Story by: Jules Furthman; John D. Klorer
- Produced by: Harry Kurnitz
- Starring: Dennis Morgan; Betsy Drake; Zachary Scott; Edmund Gwenn
- Cinematography: J. Peverell Marley
- Edited by: Folmar Blangsted
- Music by: David Buttolph
- Production company: Warner Bros. Pictures
- Distributed by: Warner Bros. Pictures
- Release date: September 16, 1950
- Running time: 90-95 minutes
- Country: United States
- Language: English
- Box office: $1.3 million

Pretty Baby is a 1950 American comedy film starring Dennis Morgan, Betsy Drake, Zachary Scott and Edmund Gwenn. A young woman's little white lie leads to unforeseen complications. Cary Grant aggressively promoted Drake, his wife, to Jack L. Warner for the lead in Pretty Baby.

== Plot ==
Patsy Douglas comes up with an ingenious way to get a seat on the crowded New York subway: she pretends to have a baby, using a doll discarded by the advertising agency where she works. One day, however, her agency's primary client, short-tempered Cyrus Baxter, happens to be seated beside her. (His chauffeur had abruptly quit after Baxter berated him for getting stuck in a traffic jam.) He is delighted when he overhears that she named her "child" Cyrus after him. He becomes acquainted with her, letting her assume that he works for Baxter as a watchman.

Later, when the agency's two bosses, Sam Morley and Barry Holmes see Baxter to try to get him to sign a contract for a new advertising campaign, he insists they keep her happy, to their puzzlement. Morley and Holmes discover that she has been fired; they quickly hire her back and promote her from her secretarial duties.

Meanwhile, Baxter keeps seeing Patsy, trying to help her with his namesake. She manages to maintain her charade, but Morley sees them together and assumes that she is Baxter's mistress. Patsy discovers her new friend's identity when her bosses send her to present their latest idea. Meanwhile, Baxter's temper improves under Patsy's influence.

When Morley and Holmes finally learn the truth, Patsy wants to confess all to Baxter, but they insist she carry on the masquerade until they get his signature on the contract. She reluctantly agrees, after they point out that they will probably have to close if they do not get Baxter's business, throwing hundreds out of work.

When Morley shows Baxter a photograph of the baby (actually a picture of his partner as a child), Baxter notices a resemblance to Holmes and assumes he is the father. To placate him, Morley arranges for Holmes to start dating Patsy. In the process, however, he becomes jealous, having fallen in love without realizing it.

When Baxter's plans for the baby become too overwhelming, Patsy tells him that she will raise her son on her own. She quits the agency as well. Baxter hires private investigator Corcoran to track her down. He finally learns there is no child. Morley confirms what Corcoran has discovered, and also admits he is in love with Patsy. A delighted Baxter insists he go after the girl. Morley catches Patsy on a subway train, and persuades her to get off at the City Hall stop to get married.

== Cast ==
- Dennis Morgan as Sam Morley
- Betsy Drake as Patsy Douglas
- Zachary Scott as Barry Holmes
- Edmund Gwenn as Cyrus Baxter
- William Frawley as Corcoran
- Raymond Roe as Sidney
- Ransom M. Sherman as Powers (as Ransom Sherman), Baxter's assistant
- Sheila MacRae as Peggy (as Sheila Stephens)
- Eleanor Audley as Miss Brindel, Baxter's secretary
- George Chandler as Henderson
- Barbara Billingsley as Edna
