= One More Tomorrow: The Best of Henry Gross =

Greatest hits album by Henry Gross
- Released: 1996
- Genre: Pop
- Label: Varèse Sarabande

Henry Gross chronology
| Nothing But Dreams (1992) | One More Tomorrow: The Best of Henry Gross (1996) | I'm Hearing Things (2000) |

Professional ratings
Review scores
| Source | Rating |
|---|---|
| AllMusic | 4.5/5 stars |

One More Tomorrow: The Best of Henry Gross is an album released by the American singer-songwriter Henry Gross. "One More Tomorrow" is a comprehensive overview of Gross' mid-'70s recordings, containing all of his hits for both A&M and Lifesong, including "Shannon" (his biggest hit), "Springtime Mama", "Someday (I Didn't Want To Have To Be The One)", and the title track.

== Track listing ==
1. Tomorrow's Memory Lane
2. Come On Say It
3. Shannon
4. Painting My Love Song
5. Juke Box Song
6. Overton Square
7. Springtime Mama
8. One More Tomorrow
9. What a Sound
10. All My Love
11. Meet Me on the Corner
12. Moonshine Alley
13. Only the Beautiful
14. Hideaway
15. Love Is the Stuff
16. Simone
17. Someday
18. If We Tie Our Ships Together
