= The Lady Takes a Sailor =

1949 film by Michael Curtiz

- Theatrical release poster
- Directed by: Michael Curtiz
- Screenplay by: Everett Freeman
- Story by: Jerry Gruskin
- Produced by: Harry Kurnitz
- Starring: Jane Wyman; Eve Arden; Dennis Morgan; Robert Douglas; Allyn Joslyn
- Cinematography: Ted D. McCord
- Edited by: David Weisbart
- Music by: Max Steiner
- Distributed by: Warner Bros. Pictures
- Release date: December 16, 1949
- Running time: 99 minutes
- Country: United States
- Language: English

The Lady Takes a Sailor is a 1949 comedy film directed by Michael Curtiz, and starring Jane Wyman, Eve Arden and Dennis Morgan.

== Plot ==
Jennifer Smith, the head of the Buyer's Research Institute, is in need of additional funding to keep the institute running. It turns out the Tyson Institute is prepared to offer her the funds. She celebrates with her friend and business partner Susan Wayne, with whom she runs a cosmetics company, by going to Susan's beautiful beach house on Long Island.

When Jennifer is out sailing, a storm flips her boat upside down near an underwater vehicle operated by a man who goes by the name of Davy Jones. Davy claims to be a zoologist, studying the underwater wildlife. He reluctantly saves Jennifer. Jennifer suspects the man is not who he says he is since he does not seem to know the first thing about marine life. Davy finally agrees to put Jennifer ashore, but after he has given her sleeping pills. Once the storm ends, Davy drops her on the beach, where she is found by Susan and the Coast Guard, who have been searching for her. Susan thinks Jennifer has dreamt her encounter with Davy and dismisses her story about the underwater vehicle. Jennifer tries to prove she is not crazy, pulling up the pictures of the vehicle from her camera, but the film seems to be missing. Word of Jennifer's wild story reaches the Tyson Institute, which withdraws its offer of funding. Outraged, Jennifer decides to prove them wrong and that Davy and the underwater vehicle really exist. She goes searching for Davy.

What Jennifer does not know is that Davy's real name is Bill Craig, a submarine engineer undertaking a secret government mission. When out one night at a club with her fiancé Ralph Whitcomb, Jennifer spots a woman whose pictures were in the underwater vehicle. The woman is a singer named Raquel Riviera, but she denies knowing Davy. He enters the club himself, and Jennifer confronts him, asking for her camera film back. Bill claims she must be mistaken, and he and Raquel leave. Jennifer and Ralph follow the couple, and when they leave their car for a while, Jennifer breaks into it and looks for some kind of identification and her film, but finds nothing.

Jennifer hires private detective Henry Duckworth, but Bill discovers Henry staking him out. Bill traps Henry when he and Jennifer try to break into the safe in his apartment, and while Henry escapes, Jennifer stays and hears Bill's explanation. He tells her as much as he can, without revealing top secret information, but before Jennifer leaves, she finds and takes back her film. Jennifer is then supposed to meet Susan, Henry and a representative of the Tyson Institute to clear her name and get her funding, but Bill manages to follow her to the meeting. Bill tries to steal the film several times, and the meeting fails, as the representative ultimately believes that Jennifer indeed is insane because of her strange behavior. Bill finally gets the film back and drives away in Henry's car, but he crashes into the Tyson representative car. Both men return to the meeting, and Bill is asked to his face if Jennifer's story is true. Since Jennifer at this point has fallen in love with Bill, she covers for him and tells everyone she made it up. She is fired from the institute, and instead begins a new life with Bill.

== Cast ==
- Jane Wyman as Jennifer Smith
- Eve Arden as Susan Wayne
- Dennis Morgan as Bill Craig
- Robert Douglas as John Tyson
- Allyn Joslyn as Ralph Whitcomb
- Tom Tully as Henry Duckworth
- Lina Romay as Racquel Riviera
- William Frawley as Oliver Harker
- Jack Lemmon had an uncredited role in his film debut.

== See also ==
- List of American films of 1949
