= This Woman Is Dangerous =

1952 film by Felix E. Feist

- Original theatrical poster
- Directed by: Felix E. Feist
- Screenplay by: Geoffrey Homes; George Worthing Yates
- Story by: Bernard Girard
- Produced by: Robert Sisk
- Starring: Joan Crawford; Dennis Morgan; David Brian
- Cinematography: Ted McCord
- Edited by: James C. Moore
- Music by: David Buttolph
- Distributed by: Warner Bros. Pictures
- Release date: February 9, 1952 (U.S.)
- Running time: 100 minutes
- Country: United States
- Language: English

This Woman Is Dangerous is a 1952 American film noir and crime drama by Warner Bros. Pictures starring Joan Crawford, David Brian, and Dennis Morgan in a story about a gun moll's romances with two different men against the background of her impending blindness. The screenplay by Geoffrey Homes and George Worthing Yates was based on a story by Bernard Girard. The film was directed by Felix E. Feist and produced by Robert Sisk.

== Plot ==
A gangster woman, Beth Austin, plagued by headaches, is rapidly losing her eyesight, as her eye doctor tells her. Criminals dressed as police raid a gambling house where Beth is visiting, and rifle the safe; it is revealed that she planned for the raid to happen. She intends to visit a famous eye clinic in Indiana, as she tells her gangster boyfriend Matt Jackson, who is suspicious about her reasons for leaving.

Dr. Ben Halleck tells her the operation is very risky and unlikely to succeed; she tells him to go ahead. Matt, traveling in Louisiana in a trailer with his brother Will and towed by his sister-in-law Ann, kills a policeman who stops them after Matt gets angry and throws a bottle of liquor out the window. Beth lies in bed, eyes bandaged, avoiding movement, for weeks during recovery.

Matt phones her, but the phone is being tapped by police suspicious of her because of her ties (including her fingerprints in the trailer) to Jackson, whom the police are hunting after the policeman's murder. When Beth's bandages are removed, she can see again, but must wear goggles for a while. At her champagne farewell dinner at the clinic, Halleck tells her she must stay in town for a while, at a nearby hotel, even after leaving the clinic.

Ben develops an interest in her and plans dinner with her at the hotel, but phones her there and says he is busy. A private investigator, Joe Crossland, runs into her there, and intimates that he's working for Matt and wants her to be careful.

Ben drives her to go shopping in Indianapolis, though he has to stop at a woman's prison, and she waits in the car, Beth relives old experiences as she witnesses a guard yelling at prisoners. Ben returns and says the prisoner died holding his hand. At Ben's home, Beth meets his young daughter Susan and helps her cook. Ben reveals his wife left him for another man. Beth tearfully tells him she can't stay with him, and must leave promptly.

Crossland tries to shake her down in exchange for not telling Matt about the situation; she slaps him and he leaves. Ben is debriefed by the FBI about Beth's ties to Matt. Matt fights Will, who doesn't want Matt to have guns or deal further with Beth, and shoves Ann, who threatens him with a gun; Will and Ann relent and let him have the guns.

Ben has to do an emergency operation for a farmboy; Beth is sent for supplies. Beth leaves information with a Chicago florist for Matt, saying she'll see Matt in the morning.

She plans to take a bus out of town, but relents. At the farmhouse. she holds a light for Ben during the operation; Ben says the boy will recover. At the bus station, Ben reveals he knows about Matt; Beth says she's going back to Matt, whom she owes a debt for past favors. She leaves on a bus to Louisville, Kentucky. Crossland speaks to the FBI, pondering cooperation.

Beth arrives at the Jacksons, and learns Crossland kept them informed, and that Matt left to go kill Ben. They all leave for Indiana. Matt has Crossland trapped and interrogates him to learn Ben's name; after Matt leaves, Crossland calls FBI agent Franklin but Matt returns, shoots and kills him before he can speak to Franklin. Matt goes to Ben's hospital, and watches him perform surgery.

Beth's party sees Crossland's body taken away, then at the hospital, Beth finds Matt watching Ben and others perform surgery. The police, alerted by a nurse Matt spoke to, shoot Will, who shot several police. Matt breaks a glass viewing window and asks which surgeon is Ben; Ben takes off his mask, but Beth hits away Matt's gun as he fires at Ben.

The doctors run, Matt fires at Beth and wounds her, and the police kill Matt as he tries to escape: he crashes through the glass into the operating theater. FBI man Franklin says Beth may get leniency for her good deeds, and Ben and Beth hold hands as they hope for an eventual better future.

== Cast ==
- Joan Crawford as Elizabeth 'Beth' Austin
- Dennis Morgan as Dr. Ben Halleck
- David Brian as Matt Jackson
- Mari Aldon as Ann Jackson
- Richard Webb as Franklin
- Philip Carey as Will Jackson
- Ian MacDonald as Joe Crossland
- Katherine Warren as Admitting Nurse
- George Chandler as Dr. Ryan
- Sherry Jackson as Susan Halleck

== Production ==
Because the script of a gangster who saw the light had become trite by the 1950s, some sources suggest that studio head Jack L. Warner offered Crawford the role hoping the expensive star would turn it down so he could put her on suspension. It could be the reason he offered the eye surgeon's role to Dennis Morgan, whose box-office appeal had diminished since World War II. To Warner's surprise, both stars accepted the film. Crawford later instructed her agents to negotiate an end to her contract with Warner Bros. She then independently produced Sudden Fear (1952), which earned the actress her third Academy Award nomination.

== Reception ==
Bosley Crowther of The New York Times called the film "fictitious junk...which is willfully delivered in the name of dramatic fare. That is as pure contrivance for the display of Miss Crawford's stony charm." Otis Guernsey Jr. of the New York Herald Tribune described it as "a long, windy, tiresome story. This Woman is Dangerous is a film of many pretenses but little convictions." John McCarten of The New Yorker dismissed the film as "the sort of nonsense she [Joan Crawford] has so often been involved in".

Harrison's Reports wrote: "The story is synthetic and never strikes a realistic note. Even the characterizations are unreal; they seem to be the kind that exist only in the imagination of a fiction writer [...] There are moments when the proceedings are tensely exciting but in the main the story is long drawn out and lacking in strong melodramatic action." William Brogdon of Variety wrote: "It is a slick dramatic entry, furbished with the kind of values that register well in general release, and it has a pulp fiction plot, excellently put together, that can be sold for good returns." Time magazine gave the film a mixed review, stating, "Joan goes through her paces as a dangerous woman with all the familiarity of long experience, but Dennis Morgan's boyish twinkling seems oddly out of place for the greatest eye doctor in the U.S."

== Home media ==
This Woman Is Dangerous was released on Region 1 DVD on March 23, 2009 (Crawford's birthday) from the Warner Archive Collection.

== Radio adaptation ==
This Woman Is Dangerous was presented on Lux Radio Theatre on March 16, 1953. The one-hour adaptation starred Virginia Mayo, with Morgan reprising his role from the film.
