= One More Tomorrow (film) =

1946 film by Peter Godfrey

- Theatrical release poster
- Directed by: Peter Godfrey
- Screenplay by: Charles Hoffman; Catherine Turney; Julius J. Epstein (additional dialogue); Philip G. Epstein (additional dialogue)
- Based on: The Animal Kingdom; 1932 play by Philip Barry
- Produced by: Benjamin Glazer
- Starring: Ann Sheridan; Dennis Morgan; Jack Carson; Alexis Smith; Jane Wyman; Reginald Gardiner
- Cinematography: Bert Glennon
- Edited by: David Weisbart
- Music by: Max Steiner
- Production company: Warner Bros. Pictures
- Distributed by: Warner Bros. Pictures
- Release date: June 1, 1946
- Running time: 87 minutes
- Country: United States
- Language: English
- Budget: $869,000
- Box office: $3,017,000

One More Tomorrow is a 1946 American drama film directed by Peter Godfrey and written by Charles Hoffman and Catherine Turney (additional dialogue by Julius J. Epstein and Philip G. Epstein) from the play The Animal Kingdom by Philip Barry. The film, starring Ann Sheridan, Dennis Morgan, Jack Carson, Alexis Smith, Jane Wyman and Reginald Gardiner. It was released by Warner Bros. Pictures on June 1, 1946. A pre-code 1932 film, The Animal Kingdom, is also based on the play.

== Plot ==
Wealthy socialite Tom Collier (Dennis Morgan) is bored by his father's aspirations for him and by his elitist crowd, except for old friend Pat Regan (Jack Carson), who serves as his butler. When Tom meets commercial photographers Christie Sage (Ann Sheridan) and Frankie Connors (Jane Wyman), he purchases a failing liberal activist magazine in order to work with Christie and be near her. Tom begins to find himself among Christie's bohemian friends, although his father does not approve. Christie eventually refuses Tom's proposal of marriage and leaves for Mexico to pursue her photography as a fine artist.

During her absence, the rebounding Tom marries gold-digging and manipulative Cecelia Henry (Alexis Smith), who plans to mold him to her own wishes. Christie returns from Mexico, realizing that she has made a mistake and that she loves Tom, but it's too late. Cecelia schemes to separate Tom from Christie, from his old friend Pat, from his magazine work, and finally, conspiring with Tom's father, from his principles. Tom must decide whether to publish an exposé on corrupt defense contractors that will compromise many of his rich friends. With Pat's help, Tom decides to move forward with the story and leave Cecelia for Christie, the woman he considers his true wife.

== Cast ==
- Ann Sheridan as Christie Sage
- Dennis Morgan as Thomas Rufus 'Tom' Collier III
- Jack Carson as Patrick 'Pat' Regan
- Alexis Smith as Cecelia Henry
- Jane Wyman as Frankie Connors
- Reginald Gardiner as James 'Jim' Aloysius Fisk
- John Loder as Owen Arthur
- Marjorie Gateson as Aunt Edna Collier
- Thurston Hall as Thomas Rufus Collier II
- John Abbott as Joseph Baronova
- Marjorie Hoshelle as Illa Baronova
- Sig Arno as Poppa Diaduska

== Production ==
Olivia de Havilland, citing overwork, refused to appear in this film and was suspended by Warner Bros. Pictures. She soon filed a lawsuit which resulted in a landmark ruling known as the De Havilland Law.

== Reception ==
A May 25, 1946 review in The New York Times, bylined “T.M.P.”, observes: “It took four of the Warner's best script writers to rewrite the Philip Barry play, "The Animal Kingdom," into the motion picture called "One More Tomorrow,"...Yet out of all this effort ... has come a film which only serves to prove how far superior Mr. Barry was at turning a sharp, meaningful phrase. The scenarists have retained only the basic framework of the play...modernized by bringing the action forward to 1939.Thus the picture is permitted to throw some sharp barbs in the direction of war-profiteering industrialists, the while Tom Collier, a reformed playboy, struggles to keep his integrity as the publisher of an honest, liberal magazine carrying on a brave and unprofitable crusade against social injustices. ...Marrying on the rebound, he acquires a worthless, mercenary and scheming spouse...and it is giving away no secret to reveal that she almost succeeds...Around this story core the scenarists have spun several layers of comedy, but ... the dialogue is blunted, whereas it needs to be razor-edged. ... Dennis Morgan is quite good as the wastrel who turns his wealth to noble purpose; Ann Sheridan and Alexis Smith are equally fetching and competent as the photographer and wife, respectively, and Reginald Gardiner gives another of his easy-going, polished performances as the editor of Bantam Magazine. Jack Carson, in the role of a Brooklyn fighter turned butcher, wanders through the film cracking bad jokes and has a high time insulting the socialites.”

Josephine O'Neill's July 20, 1947 review, published in the Sydney Daily Telegraph, also compared the picture unfavorably to its supposed source: “This film was well under way before I grasped that we were seeing a remake of Philip Barry's comedy-drama. That early version was both sophisticated and blunt. The new Warner Bros script… almost obscures the core of Mr. Barry's play— that the hero's wife was a mistress at heart and the mistress was a true wife. The current version gets in a champagne frenzy about the activities of the hero on a wartime magazine, and makes much extraneous capital out of society photography… Remnants of Mr. Barry's original dialogue and situations spike oddly from the general caramel sauce. Dennis Morgan is worried and sip-cere as the gentleman who marries the wrong .woman; Reginald Gardiner, departing smoothly from type, makes the magazine publisher a vivid fellow; Jack" Carson's butler (remember William Gargan in the original character?) teeters between smiles and tears; Alexis Smith, as the wife, is competent; Ann Sheridan as the goor but honest girl, is hard to believe; Jane Wyman trots briskly in and out of a film that is an interesting example of the Hollywood adage: Never leave well, or fairly well, alone. The case is more depressing since George Seaton's direction lends an unexpected warmth to certain scenes. To Sum Up: Why DO they do it?”

According to Warner Bros records, the film earned $2,358,000 domestically and $659,000 foreign.
