= Betsy Drake =

American actress, writer, and psychotherapist (1923–2015)

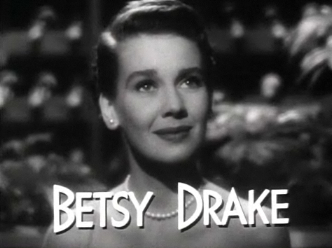
- Drake in Every Girl Should Be Married (1948)
- Born: September 11, 1923; Paris, France
- Died: October 27, 2015 (aged 92); London, England
- Other name: Betsy Drake Grant
- Education: Harvard University (M.Ed.)
- Occupations: actress; writer; psychotherapist
- Years active: 1948–1965 (as actress)
- Spouse: Cary Grant (m. 1949; div. 1962)

Betsy Drake (September 11, 1923 – October 27, 2015) was an American actress, writer, and psychotherapist. She was the third wife of actor Cary Grant.

== Early life and education ==
Betsy Drake, the eldest child of two American expatriates, was born in Paris. Her grandfather, Tracy Drake, and his brother had opened the Drake Hotel in Chicago on New Year's Eve in 1920. The Drakes lost their money in the 1929 stock-market crash. As a result, she returned to the U.S. on the SS Île de France with her parents, brothers, and a nanny. She grew up in Chicago; Westport, Connecticut; Washington, DC; Virginia; North Carolina; and New York City. She went to 12 different schools, both private and public, before concentrating on theater and acting at National Park Seminary.

== Career ==
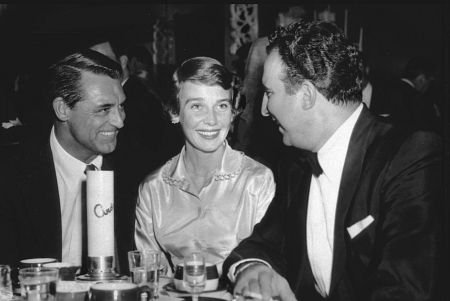
Cary Grant, Drake, and Dick Stabile in 1955

Drake began looking for work as an actress in New York City, supporting herself by working as a Conover model. She met the playwright Horton Foote, who offered her a job as an understudy in his play Only the Heart, which enabled her to join the Actors' Equity Association and thus become a professional actress.

After coming to the attention of the producer Hal Wallis, Drake was pressured by her agent to sign a Hollywood contract. She hated Hollywood and managed to be released from the contract by declaring herself insane. She returned to New York City and, in 1947, read for the director Elia Kazan for the lead role in the London company of the play Deep Are the Roots. Later that year, Drake was selected by Kazan as one of the founding members of the Actors Studio.

Cary Grant spotted her in 1947 while she was performing in London. The two, who both happened to be returning to the U.S. on the RMS Queen Mary, struck up an instant rapport. At the insistence of Grant, Drake was subsequently signed to a film contract by RKO Pictures and David Selznick, where she appeared, opposite Grant, in her first film, the romantic comedy Every Girl Should Be Married (1948). New York Times film critic Bosley Crowther called her performance “foxily amusing”.

On Christmas Day 1949, Drake and Grant married in a private ceremony organized by Grant's best man, Howard Hughes, and chose a low-key, introspective private life. They delved into transcendentalism, mysticism, and yoga. She took up causes including the plight of homeless children in Los Angeles. In 1954, they bought the "Las Palomas" estate in The Movie Colony neighborhood of Palm Springs, California.

The couple co-starred in the radio series Mr. and Mrs. Blandings (1951). They appeared together in the comedy drama Room for One More (1952), and Drake appeared in leading roles in England and the U.S., and a supporting role in the satiric comedy film Will Success Spoil Rock Hunter? (1957).

Drake wrote the original script for the film Houseboat (1958) under a pseudonym, basing it on an unpublished story she had written. Starring Grant, Drake anticipated co-starring in the film. Grant, however, who began an affair with Sophia Loren while filming The Pride and the Passion (1957), arranged for Loren to take Drake's place in Houseboat with a rewritten script for which Drake did not receive credit. The affair ended in bitterness before The Pride and the Passion's filming ended, causing problems on the Houseboat set.

Drake subsequently gave up acting and pursued other career interests. She earned a Master of Education degree from Harvard University and became a children's therapist. Drake was a director of psychodrama at the UCLA Neuropsychiatric Institute, worked at Cedars-Sinai Hospital, and maintained a private therapy practice. She taught at UCLA, Pepperdine University, and presented research at the 52nd Annual Meeting American Orthopsychiatric Association in 1975. Under the name Betsy Drake Grant, her novel Children, You Are Very Little (1971) was published by Atheneum Books.

Drake's last screen appearance was in the documentary film Cary Grant: A Class Apart (2005), in which she reflected on Grant and their time together, and denied rumors alleging he was homosexual while suggesting he may have been bisexual.

== Personal life ==
In July 1956, Drake survived the sinking of the Italian ocean liner SS Andrea Doria. At the time, she had been visiting Grant in Spain and was returning to the United States. She boarded it along with dozens of other wealthy travelers and tourists at Gibraltar, which was one of many stops the ship made between her home port of Genoa and her final destination of New York City. Drake sailed as a first-class passenger, occupying a single cabin on the ship's boat deck. When the SS Andrea Doria collided with the Stockholm, Drake waited with the other passengers for rescue, as the ship's severe list rendered half of its lifeboats useless. She was among more than 1600 people rescued from the ship by the famed French passenger liner SS Île de France.

Grant and Drake separated in 1958, remaining friends, and divorced in 1962. Their marriage constituted his longest union. Grant credited her with broadening his interests beyond his career and with introducing him to the then-legal LSD therapy and to hypnosis. Drake took LSD as a way of recovering from the trauma of divorce. She never married again.

Drake spent the latter part of her life in London, where she died, aged 92, on October 27, 2015.

== Filmography ==
- Every Girl Should Be Married (1948) as Anabel Sims
- Dancing in the Dark (1949) as Julie Clarke
- The Second Woman (1950) as Ellen Foster
- Pretty Baby (1950) as Patsy Douglas
- Room for One More (1952) as Anna Rose
- Will Success Spoil Rock Hunter? (1957) as Jenny Wells
- General Electric Theater as Ellie (one episode, 1958)
- Intent to Kill (1958) as Dr. Nancy Ferguson
- Next to No Time (1958) as Georgie Brant
- Clarence, the Cross-Eyed Lion (1965) as Julie Harper

== Television credits ==
- General Electric Theater as Ellie in "A Question of Romance" (1958)
- Wanted: Dead or Alive as Lucy Fremont in "The Spurs" (1959)
- Cary Grant: A Class Apart (2005) as herself

== See also ==
- List of American film actresses
- List of Harvard University people
- List of novelists from the United States
- List of old-time radio people
- List of women writers

== Suggested reading ==
- Grant, Betsy Drake (1971). Children You Are Very Little. Atheneum Books: New York City; OCLC 192964.
