= David Wayne =

American actor (1914–1995)

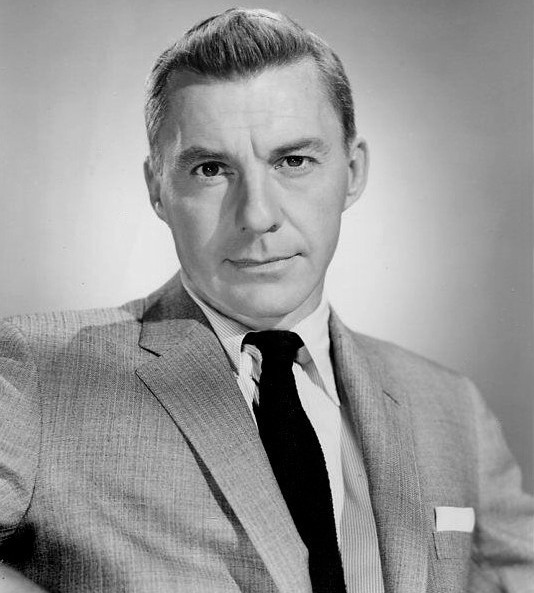
- Wayne in 1955
- Born: Wayne James McMeekan; January 30, 1914; Traverse City, Michigan, U.S.
- Died: February 9, 1995 (aged 81); Santa Monica, California, U.S.
- Education: Western Michigan University
- Occupations: Actor; singer
- Years active: 1936–1994
- Spouse: Jane Gordon (m. 1941; died 1993)
- Children: 3

David Wayne (born Wayne James McMeekan; January 30, 1914 – February 9, 1995) was an American actor and singer, with a stage and screen career spanning over 50 years. He was a recipient of two Tony Awards, Best Featured Actor in a Musical for Finian's Rainbow and Best Actor in a Play for The Teahouse of the August Moon, with a third nomination for The Happy Time.

== Early life and career ==
Wayne was born in Traverse City, Michigan, the son of Helen Matilda (née Mason) and John David McMeekan. His mother died when he was four.

Wayne attended Western Michigan University for two years before working as a statistician in Cleveland. He began acting with Cleveland's Shakesperean repertory theatre in 1936.

When World War II began, Wayne volunteered as an ambulance driver with the British Army in North Africa. When the United States entered the war he joined the United States Army.

Wayne's first major Broadway role was Og the leprechaun in Finian's Rainbow, for which he won the Theatre World Award and the first ever Tony, for Actor, Supporting or Featured (Musical). While appearing in the play, he and co-stars Albert Sharpe and Maude Simmons were recruited by producer David O. Selznick for roles in the film Portrait of Jennie (1948).

In 1948, Wayne was one of 50 applicants (out of approximately 700) granted membership in New York's newly formed Actors Studio.

He was awarded a second Tony, for Best Actor (Dramatic), for The Teahouse of the August Moon and was nominated as Best Actor (Musical) for The Happy Time. He originated the role of Ensign Pulver in the classic stage comedy Mister Roberts and also appeared in Say, Darling; After the Fall; and Incident at Vichy.

== Film and television career ==
In films, Wayne was most often cast as a supporting player, such as the piano-playing neighbor of Spencer Tracy and Katharine Hepburn's characters in Adam's Rib (1949). He portrayed the child killer, originally played by Peter Lorre, in the remake of M (1951), in a rare title and villainous role. Wayne appeared in four films with Marilyn Monroe, more than any other actor: As Young as You Feel (1951), We're Not Married (1952), O. Henry's Full House (1952) (although he shared no scenes with Monroe), and How to Marry a Millionaire (1953) where he had scenes with Monroe. He starred in The Tender Trap (1955) with Frank Sinatra, Debbie Reynolds, and Celeste Holm.

In 1955, Wayne starred in the NBC comedy Norby. Wayne appeared in the late 1950s on ABC's The Pat Boone Chevy Showroom and the Twilight Zone episode "Escape Clause". In 1959 he starred in the role of Major General Henning von Tresckow in the Alcoa-Goodyear Theatre production "Operation Spark", depicting the plot to assassinate Adolph Hitler. He starred as Darius Woodley in two 1961 episodes of NBC's The Outlaws starring Barton MacLane. Also in 1961, Wayne appeared in the Bell Telephone Company-produced driver safety film Anatomy of an Accident, about a family outing tragically cut short by a car accident.

He played the Mad Hatter, one of the recurring villains in the 1960s television series Batman. In 1964, he guest-starred in the series finale, "Pay Now, Die Later", of CBS's drama Mr. Broadway. Also in the 1960s, Wayne was a radio host on NBC's magazine program Monitor.

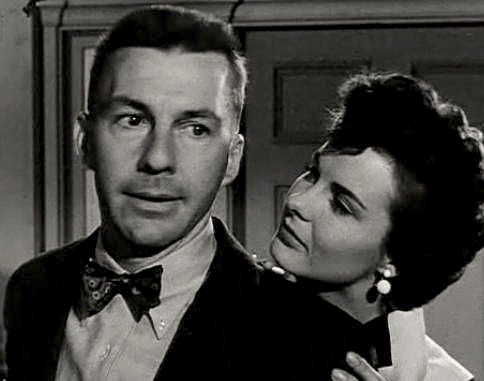
Wayne and Jean Peters in trailer for As Young as You Feel (1951)

Wayne was known for his role as Dr. Charles Dutton in Michael Crichton's The Andromeda Strain (1971). He also appeared as Uncle Timothy Jamison in the NBC sitcom The Brian Keith Show and played Charles Dutton in The Good Life, also on NBC. Wayne made a guest appearance in a leading role for a 1975 episode of Gunsmoke titled "I Have Promises to Keep". He co-starred with Jim Hutton in the 1976 television series Ellery Queen (as Inspector Richard Queen).

In 1978, Wayne played James Lawrence in the ABC drama Family, and he played Digger Barnes in four episodes of the CBS soap opera Dallas. Wayne's friend Keenan Wynn later replaced Wayne in this role. From 1979 to 1982, Wayne starred as Dr. Amos Weatherby in the television series House Calls.

== Personal life ==
Wayne was married to Jane Gordon in 1941 and had two daughters and a son. In August 1970, their son disappeared and was presumed drowned during a camping and fishing trip. Wayne's wife, daughter of opera vocalist Jeanne Gordon, died in 1993.

== Death ==
On February 9, 1995, Wayne died in his Santa Monica, California, home from complications of lung cancer at age 81.

== Awards ==
Wayne won two Tony Awards, one in 1947 for Finian's Rainbow and one in 1954 for The Teahouse of the August Moon. In 1958, he was nominated for a Primetime Emmy Award for his work on the mystery-thriller anthology series Suspicion. Additionally, he received two Photoplay Awards for his performances in the 1951 war film Up Front and the 1950 dark comedy Stella. Along with his turn in Stella, Wayne was nominated that same year for a second Photoplay Award, but in the category of Most Promising Male Star.

== Filmography ==
Features:

- Stranger on the Third Floor (1940) as Cab Driver (uncredited)
- Portrait of Jennie (1948) as Gus O'Toole
- Adam's Rib (1949) as Kip Lurie
- The Reformer and the Redhead (1950) as Arthur Colner Maxwell
- Stella (1950) as Carl Granger
- My Blue Heaven (1950) as Walter Pringle
- Up Front (1951) as Joe
- M (1951) as Martin W. Harrow
- As Young as You Feel (1951) as Joe Elliott
- With a Song in My Heart (1952) as Don Ross
- Wait Till the Sun Shines, Nellie (1952) as Ben Halper
- We're Not Married! (1952) as Jeff Norris
- O. Henry's Full House (1952) as Horace ("The Cop and the Anthem" segment)
- The I Don't Care Girl (1953) as Ed McCoy
- Tonight We Sing (1953) as Sol Hurok
- Down Among the Sheltering Palms (1953) as Lieutenant Carl G. Schmidt
- How to Marry a Millionaire (1953) as Freddie Denmark
- Hell and High Water (1954) as Tugboat Walker
- The Tender Trap (1955) as Joe McCall
- The Naked Hills (1956) as Tracy Powell
- The Three Faces of Eve (1957) as Ralph White
- The Sad Sack (1957) as Corporal Larry Dolan
- The Last Angry Man (1959) as Woodrow 'Woody' Thrasher
- The Big Gamble (1961) as Samuel Brennan
- The Andromeda Strain (1971) as Dr. Charles Dutton
- The African Elephant (1971; documentary) as narrator
- Huckleberry Finn (1974) as The Duke
- The Front Page (1974) as Bensinger
- Tubby the Tuba (1975) as Pee-Wee the Piccolo (voice)
- The Apple Dumpling Gang (1975) as Colonel T.R. Clydesdale
- A Place to Be (1979; documentary) as narrator
- The Prize Fighter (1979) as Pop Morgan
- Finders Keepers (1984) as Stapleton
- The Survivalist (1987) as Dub Daniels

Short subjects:

- Screen Snapshots: Hollywood Awards (1951) as himself
- Screen Snapshots: Hollywood Night Life (1952) as himself
- Anatomy of an Accident (1961) as John Avery
- John F. Kennedy: 1917-1963 (1979) as narrator

== Television work ==
- Great Catherine (1948, TV Movie)
- Norby (1955) as Preston (a.k.a) Pearson Norby (canceled after 13 episodes)
- Alfred Hitchcock Presents (1957) (Season 2 Episode 28: "One More Mile to Go") as Sam Jacoby
- Suspicion (1957) (Season 1 Episode 7: Heartbeat) as James Mennick
- The Strawberry Blonde (1959, TV Movie) as Biff Grimes
- The Twilight Zone, "Escape Clause" (1959) as Walter Bedeker
- Wagon Train (1960) (The Shad Bennington Story) as Shadrack Bennington
- Naked City, "The Multiplicity of Herbert Konish" (1962) as Herbert Konish
- Teahouse of the August Moon (1962 TV movie) as Sakini
- Kings of Broadway (1962, TV Movie) (unsold pilot)
- The Alfred Hitchcock Hour (1963) (Season 1 Episode 15: "The Thirty-First of February") as Andrew Anderson
- Cowboy and the Tiger (1963, TV Movie) as Narrator (unsold pilot)
- Lamp at Midnight (1966, TV Movie) as Father Firenzuola
- Batman (1966, guest villain, episodes 13, 14, 69, 70) as The Mad Hatter
- Arsenic and Old Lace (1969, TV Movie) as Teddy Brewster
- The Boy Who Stole the Elephant (1970, TV Movie) as Colonel Rufus Ryder
- Night Gallery, "The Diary" (1971) as Dr. Mill (segment "The Diary")
- Mooch Goes to Hollywood (1971, TV Movie) as Himself (uncredited)
- The Good Life (1971–1972) as Charles Dutton
- The Catcher (1972, TV Movie) as Armand Faber
- The Dark Side (1972) (unsold pilot)
- The Streets of San Francisco (1972, TV Series) as Wally Sensibaugh
- Banacek ("Ten Thousand Dollars a Page") (1973) as Walter Tyson
- Hawaii Five-O ("30,000 Rooms and I Have the Key") (1974) as Monsieur Bordeaux
- Return of the Big Cat (1974, TV Movie) as Grandpa Jubal
- Barney Miller ("Bureaucrat") (1975) as E. J. Heiss
- Gunsmoke ("I Have Promises to Keep") (1973-1975) as Reverend Byrne / Judge Warfield
- It's a Bird...It's a Plane...It's Superman (1975, TV Movie) as Dr. Abner Sedgwick
- Ellery Queen (1975–1976) as Inspector Richard Queen
- Once an Eagle (1976, TV Mini-Series) as Colonel Terwilliger
- In the Glitter Palace (1977, TV Movie) as Nate Redstone
- Hunter ("Yesterday Upon the Stair") (1977)
- Black Beauty (1978, TV Mini-Series) as Mr. Dowling / Narrator
- Loose Change (1978, TV Mini-Series) as Dr. Moe Sinden
- Murder at the Mardi Gras (1978, TV Movie) as Mickey Mills
- Dallas (1978) as Digger Barnes
- The Gift of Love (1978, TV Movie) as O'Henry / Narrator
- The Girls in the Office (1979, TV Movie) as Ben Nayfack
- An American Christmas Carol (1979, TV Movie) as Merrivale
- Eight is Enough (1980) as Matt
- House Calls (1979–1982) as Dr. Amos Weatherby
- Matt Houston (1984) S2/Ep20, "Blood Ties" as Bill Houston
- Murder, She Wrote (1985, TV Series) as Cyrus Leffingwell
- Newhart (1985, TV Series) as Mr. Pittman (episode "Pirate Pete")
- The Golden Girls (1986) as Big Daddy
- Poker Alice (1987, TV Movie, based on the frontier gambler Poker Alice, with Elizabeth Taylor in the starring role) as Amos (final film role)

== Stage appearances ==
- As You Like It (1935) (Cleveland)
- Escape This Night (April 22 – May 1938) (Broadway)
- Dance Night (October 14–16, 1938) (Broadway)
- The American Way (January 21 – September 23, 1939) (Broadway)
- The Scene of the Crime (March 28 – April 4, 1940) (Broadway)
- The Merry Widow (Revival) (August 4, 1943 – May 6, 1944) (Broadway)
- Peepshow (February 3–26, 1944) (Broadway)
- Park Avenue (November 4, 1946 – January 4, 1947) (Broadway)
- Finian's Rainbow (January 10, 1947 – October 2, 1948) (Broadway) (replaced by Philip Truex in February 1948)
- Mister Roberts (February 18, 1948 – January 6, 1951) (Broadway) (replaced by Larry Blyden in 1950)
- The Teahouse of the August Moon (October 15, 1953 – March 24, 1956) (Broadway) (replaced by Burgess Meredith in 1954)
- The Ponder Heart (February 16 – June 23, 1956) (Broadway)
- The Loud Red Patrick (October 3 – December 22, 1956) (Broadway)
- Say, Darling (April 3, 1958 – January 17, 1959) (Broadway) (replaced by Eddie Albert in 1959)
- Send Me No Flowers (December 5, 1960 – January 7, 1961) (Broadway)
- Venus at Large (April 12–14, 1962) (Broadway)
- Too True to Be Good (Revival) (March 12 – June 1, 1963) (Broadway)
- After the Fall (January 23, 1964 – May 29, 1965) (ANTA Washington Square Theatre)
- Marco Millions (February 20 – June 18, 1964) (ANTA Washington Square Theatre)
- But For Whom Charlie (March 12 – July 2, 1964) (ANTA Washington Square Theatre)
- Incident at Vichy (December 3, 1964 – May 7, 1965) (ANTA Washington Square Theatre)
- The Yearling (December 10–11, 1965) (Broadway)
- Show Boat (July 1966) Lincoln Center (Role; Capt. Andy)
- The Happy Time (January 18 – September 28, 1968) (Broadway)

== Radio appearances ==
Year	Program	Episode/source
1952	Stars in the Air	Good Sam
1953	Lux Radio Theatre	Wait 'Till the Sun Shines, Nellie
