= Joseph MacDonald (cinematographer) =

American cinematographer

Joseph MacDonald, A.S.C.
- Born: Joseph Patrick MacDonald; May 26, 1906; Mexico City, Mexico
- Died: December 15, 1968 (aged 62); Woodland Hills, California, U.S.
- Occupation: Cinematographer

Joseph Patrick MacDonald, A.S.C. (December 15, 1906 - May 26, 1968) was a Mexico-born American cinematographer. An assistant cameraman from the early 1920s, he became a cinematographer in the 1940s and soon was working on Hollywood productions, mostly at 20th Century Fox. He was usually billed as Joe MacDonald. He was the first Mexico-born cinematographer, and only the second overall, after Leon Shamroy, to film a movie in CinemaScope (How to Marry a Millionaire), as well as the first Mexico-born cinematographer to film a movie in Deluxe Color.

== Select filmography ==
- Charlie Chan in Rio (1941)
- Little Tokyo, U.S.A. (1942)
- Wintertime (1943)
- Quiet Please, Murder (1943)
- Sunday Dinner for a Soldier (1944)
- In the Meantime, Darling (1944)
- The Big Noise (1944)
- Captain Eddie (1945)
- My Darling Clementine (1946)
- Shock (1946)
- The Dark Corner (1946)
- Wake Up and Dream (1946)
- Behind Green Lights (1946)
- Moss Rose (1947)
- Call Northside 777 (1948)
- The Street with No Name (1948)
- Down to the Sea in Ships (1949)
- Yellow Sky (1949)
- It Happens Every Spring (1949)
- Pinky (1949)
- Stella (1950)
- Panic in the Streets (1950)
- As Young as You Feel (1951)
- You're in the Navy Now (1951)
- Fourteen Hours (1951)
- Viva Zapata! (1952)
- What Price Glory (1952)
- O. Henry's Full House (1952)
- Niagara (1953)
- Pickup on South Street (1953)
- How to Marry a Millionaire (1953)
- Titanic (1953)
- Broken Lance (1954)
- Woman's World (1954)
- Hell and High Water (1954)
- The Racers (1955)
- House of Bamboo (1955)
- Hilda Crane (1956)
- On the Threshold of Space (1956)
- Teenage Rebel (1956)
- The True Story of Jesse James (1956)
- Bigger Than Life (1956)
- Will Success Spoil Rock Hunter? (1957)
- A Hatful of Rain (1957)
- The Fiend Who Walked the West (1958)
- Ten North Frederick (1958)
- The Young Lions (1958)
- Warlock (1959)
- Pepe (1960)
- The Gallant Hours (1960)
- The Last Time I Saw Archie (1961)
- 40 Pounds of Trouble (1962)
- Taras Bulba (1962)
- Walk on the Wild Side (1962)
- Kings of the Sun (1963)
- The List of Adrian Messenger (1963)
- Invitation to a Gunfighter (1964)
- The Carpetbaggers (1964)
- Rio Conchos (1964)
- Flight from Ashiya (1964)
- Where Love Has Gone (1964)
- The Reward (1965)
- Mirage (1965)
- Alvarez Kelly (1966)
- The Sand Pebbles (1966)
- Blindfold (1966)
- A Guide for the Married Man (1967)
- Mackenna's Gold (1969; released posthumously)

== Accolades ==
Nominations

- Academy Awards: Oscar, Best Cinematography, Black-and-White, for The Young Lions; 1959.
- Academy Awards: Oscar, Best Cinematography, for Pepe; 1961.
- Academy Awards: Oscar, Best Cinematography, for The Sand Pebbles; 1967.
