= Jean Peters =

American actress (1926–2000)

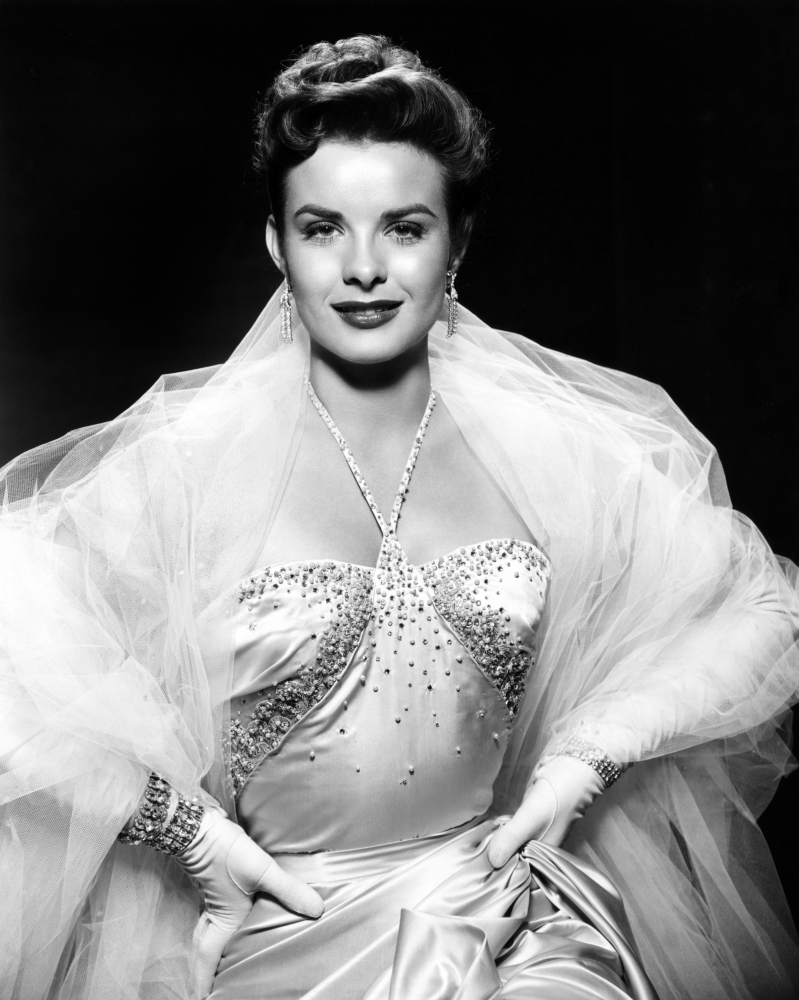
- Peters in the 1950s
- Born: Elizabeth Jean Peters; October 15, 1926; East Canton, Ohio, U.S.
- Died: October 13, 2000 (aged 73); Carlsbad, California, U.S.
- Resting place: Holy Cross Cemetery, Culver City
- Occupation: Actress
- Years active: 1947–1988
- Spouses: Stuart W. Cramer III (m. 1954; div. 1955) Howard Hughes (m. 1957; div. 1971) Stan Hough (m. 1971; died 1990)

Elizabeth Jean Peters (October 15, 1926 – October 13, 2000) was an American film actress. She was known as a star of 20th Century Fox in the late 1940s and early '50s and as the second wife of Howard Hughes. Although possibly best known for her siren role in Pickup on South Street (1953), Peters was known for her resistance to being turned into a sex symbol. She preferred to play unglamorous, down-to-earth women.

Late in her career and after her retirement, Peters occasionally played roles in TV productions, appearing in four from 1973 to 1988.

== Early life ==
Peters was born on October 15, 1926, in East Canton, Ohio, the eldest daughter of Elizabeth Thomas (née Diesel; 1898–1987) and Gerald Peters (1900–1937), a laundry manager. She had a younger sister, Shirley Peters (born 1935). Raised on a small farm in East Canton, Peters attended East Canton High School. She was a Methodist. She went to college at the University of Michigan and later transferred to the Ohio State University, where she studied to become a teacher and majored in literature. While studying for a teaching degree at Ohio State, she entered and won the Miss Ohio State Pageant in the fall of 1945, besting 11 other finalists. Sponsored by photographer Paul Robinson, she was awarded the grand prize of a screen test with 20th Century-Fox.

== Career ==
=== 20th Century Fox ===
As her agent, Robinson accompanied Peters to Hollywood, and helped her secure a seven-year contract with Fox. She dropped out of college to become an actress, a decision she later regretted. (In the late 1940s, Peters returned to college, in between filming, to complete her work and obtain a degree.)

Fox announced that in her first film I Wonder Who's Kissing Her Now (1947), she would play an "ugly duckling", supported by "artificial freckles and horn-rimmed glasses". She eventually withdrew from the film. Peters was tested in 1946 for a farm girl role in Scudda Hoo! Scudda Hay! (1948), but the producer and director decided she was not suitable.

=== Film debut ===
Peters was selected to replace Linda Darnell as the female lead in Captain from Castile (1947) opposite Tyrone Power, when Darnell was reassigned to save the production of Forever Amber. Although she had not yet made her screen debut, Peters was highly publicized. She received star treatment during the filming. Captain from Castile was a hit. Leonard Maltin wrote that afterwards, Peters spent the new decade playing "sexy spitfires, often in period dramas and Westerns."

She was offered a similar role in the Western Yellow Sky (1948), but she refused the part, explaining it was "too sexy". As a result, the studio, frustrated by her stubbornness, put her on her first suspension.

For her second film, Deep Waters (1948), which Peters filmed in late 1947, she was reunited with her director from Captain from Castile, Henry King. On this, she commented: "It's really a break for me, because he knows where he's going and what he wants, and I naturally have great confidence in him." The film was not nearly as successful as Captain from Castile, but Peters was again noticed. She was named among the best five "finds" of the year, along with Barbara Bel Geddes, Valli, Richard Widmark, and Wanda Hendrix.

She was next assigned to co-star with Clifton Webb in Mr. Belvedere Goes to College (1949), but Shirley Temple later replaced her.

In early 1949, Peters signed on to play Ray Milland's love interest in It Happens Every Spring (1949). For the role, she offered to bleach her hair, but the studio overruled this. Although the film became a success, most of the publicity was for Milland's performance.

Peters next starred alongside Paul Douglas in the period film Love That Brute (1950), for which she had to wear a dress so snug she was unable to sit. The film was originally titled Turned Up Toes, and Peters was cast in the film in June 1949, shortly after the release of It Happens Every Spring. To prepare for a singing and dancing scene, Peters took a few lessons with Betty Grable's dance instructor.

By 1950, Peters was almost forgotten by the public, but she had been playing lead roles since 1947. In late 1950, she was cast in a secondary role as a college girl in Take Care of My Little Girl (1951). A Long Beach newspaper reported that Peters gained her role by impressing Jean Negulesco with her sewing. She once became famous for playing a simple country girl, but as she grew up, the studio did not find her any more suitable roles.

=== Stardom ===
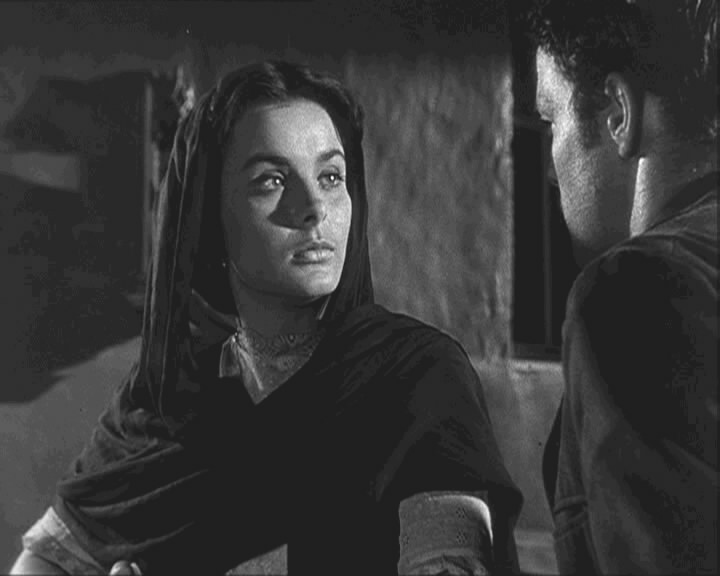
Jean Peters in Viva Zapata! (1952)

At her insistence, Peters was given the title role in Anne of the Indies (1951), which the press declared was the film that finally brought her stardom. Before its release, she was cast in Viva Zapata! (1952) opposite Marlon Brando. Julie Harris had been considered for this role. Also in 1951, Peters had her first collaboration with Marilyn Monroe, when they had secondary roles in As Young as You Feel.

Peters was set to play the title role in the drama film Wait Till the Sun Shines, Nellie (1952). It was the first time since the beginning of her career that Peters had received this much publicity. While shooting the film in Hutchinson, Kansas, Peters was honored with the title Miss Wheatheart of America. Peters was one of many names in the studio's O. Henry's Full House (1952). She co-starred with Jeffrey Hunter in Lure of the Wilderness (1952).

In 1953, director Samuel Fuller chose Peters over Marilyn Monroe for the part of Candy in Pickup on South Street. He said he thought Peters had the right blend of sex appeal and the tough-talking, streetwise quality he was seeking. Monroe, he said, was too innocent-looking for the role. Shelley Winters and Betty Grable had been considered, but both had turned it down. Because of the sexual attractiveness of her character, Peters was not thrilled with the role. She preferred playing more down-to-earth, unglamorous parts as she had done with Anne of the Indies (1951), Viva Zapata! (1952), and Lure of the Wilderness (1952).

For Pickup on South Street, Peters was advised to bleach her hair, but she refused to do so, wanting to avoid comparisons with Winters and Grable. She did agree to adopt a "sexy shuffle" for the role. She was helped by Marilyn Monroe to understand the role of a siren. Peters later said that she had enjoyed making the film, but announced in an interview that she was not willing to take on other siren roles. She said: "Pickup on South Street was fine for my career, but that doesn't mean I'm going to put on a tight sweater and skirt and slither around. I'm just not the type. On Marilyn Monroe it looks good. On me it would look silly." In another interview, Peters explained that playing down-to-earth and sometimes unwashed women has the most to offer in the way of drama.

She said:

A clothes horse seldom has lines or situations that pierce the outer layer and get into the core of life. After all, a woman in the latest Paris creation might feel and think like a plain, simple soul, but the clothes she wears would prevent her from revealing exactly what she feels and thinks. One look in the mirror and she must live up to what she sees there. The same is true on screen. If the character is chic and soignee and lines are either 'bright' or 'smart aleck' I do not think of myself as a person suited to reading such lines. Sophistication in an actress usually comes from many years of training. I came to the screen from the classroom and I'm learning as I go along. I like to play roles I understand. As I am a farm girl, born and raised near Canton, Ohio, I like the frank, honest approach. Innuendo, intrigue, the devious slant, are foreign to me and to the sort of character I best understand. I often think our glamorization of Hollywood stars – the perpetual photographing us in ermine and bouffant tulle, in French bathing suits or sleek satin – throws the public off. They don't recognize us as human beings subject to the same discomforts of climate and working conditions as they are. They expect to see that goddess leading a couple of wolfhounds come striding onto the set. Because I like to get away from all that and down to the heart of things I choose such characters as Josefa, or Anne, or Louise, the girl in Lure of the Wilderness.

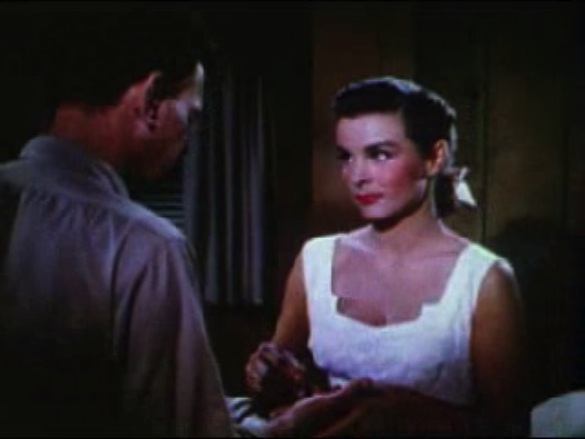
Peters mending Joseph Cotten's hand in Niagara (1953)

Peters and Marilyn Monroe starred together in Niagara, also starring Joseph Cotten. In Niagara, Peters replaced Anne Baxter, with whom she co-starred in the anthology film O. Henry's Full House (1952). Shooting of Niagara took place in the summer of 1952. Peters's character was initially the leading role, but the film eventually became a vehicle for Monroe, who was by that time more successful.

Peters's third film in 1953, A Blueprint for Murder, reunited her with Joseph Cotten. She was assigned to the film in December 1952 and told the press she liked playing in the film because it allowed her to sing, but no song by her is used in the picture, only her playing a piano. Shortly after the film's premiere in July 1953, the studio renewed Peters' contract for another two years.

In 1953, she also starred in the film noir Vicki. Writer Leo Townsend bought the story of the film, a remake of I Wake Up Screaming, as a vehicle for Peters. Townsend said that he gave the role to Peters in December 1952, because she was "one of the greatest sirens he's ever seen."

Next, Peters was assigned to replace Crain in the film Three Coins in the Fountain (1954), which was shot on location in late 1953 in Italy. Peters was unsatisfied with her role and said in a September 1953 interview: "When I heard Dorothy McGuire, Clifton Webb, and Maggie McNamara were going to be in the picture, I thought I would finally have the kind of role that suited me. They sounded like smart, sophisticated company. But when I got to Italy and read the script, I discovered I was going to be an earthy kind of girl again. The script had me nearly being killed in a runaway truck." However, the film became a great success and brought Peters again into the limelight.

=== Final films ===
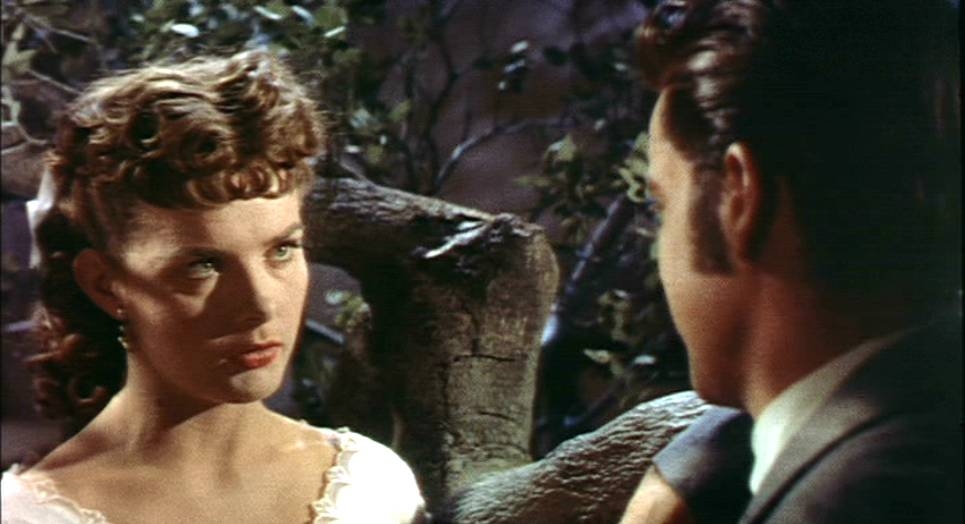
Peters in the trailer for the film Broken Lance (1954)

Other 1954 films co-starring Peters were the Westerns Apache (borrowed by Warner Bros.) and Broken Lance. Although the latter did not attract much attention, she was critically acclaimed for her performance in the former. One critic praised her for "giving an excellent account for herself", declaring she was "on her way to becoming one of the finest young actresses around Hollywood today."

Peters's next (and ultimately final) film was A Man Called Peter (1955), in which she played Catherine Marshall, the wife of Peter Marshall, a Presbyterian minister and chaplain of the United States Senate. After the release of A Man Called Peter, Peters refused several roles, for which she was placed on suspension by the studio.

=== Retirement ===
Deciding she had had enough, Peters left Fox to focus on her private life. Following her marriage to Howard Hughes, she retired from acting. In 1957, producer Jerry Wald tried to persuade her not to leave Hollywood, but had no luck. She was supposedly discouraged from continuing as an actress by Hughes, and reported in late 1957 that she was planning on becoming a producer.

In March 1959, it was announced that Peters was to return to the screen for a supporting role in The Best of Everything. She did not appear in that film, though, and despite her earlier announcement, never produced a film.

=== Return to acting ===
In 1970, rumors arose of Peters making a comeback to acting when the press reported that she was considering three film offers and a weekly TV series for the 1970–1971 season. She chose the television movie Winesburg, Ohio (1973). Afterwards, she said, "I am not pleased with the show or my performance in it. I found it rather dull." At the beginning, she had expressed enthusiasm for the project, saying: "I'm very fond of this script. It's the right age for me. I won't have to pretend I'm a glamour girl." Her co-star William Windom praised her, saying she was "warm, friendly, and charming on the set."

In 1976, Peters had a supporting role in the TV miniseries The Moneychangers. When asked why she took the role, she said: "I'll be darned if I know. A moment of madness, I think. I ran into my old friend Ross Hunter, who was producing The Moneychangers for NBC-TV, and he asked me if I wanted to be in it. It seemed like fun. It's a nice part – not too big – and I greatly admire Christopher Plummer, whom I play opposite."

Peters appeared in the 1981 television film Peter and Paul, produced by her then-husband, Stan Hough. She guest-starred in Murder, She Wrote in 1988, which was her final acting performance.

== Personal life ==
After landing a contract in Hollywood, Peters moved there, where she initially lived with her aunt, Melba Diesel. From the beginning of her career, Peters openly admitted she did not like fame due to the crowds. Co-actors at Fox recalled that she was very serious about her career. Jeanne Crain said Peters was "anything but a party girl". Despite her clashes with the studio, Peters was well-liked by other contract players.

One biographer recalled: "In all the research and planning that went into this book, no one ever had an unkind word to say of Miss Peters, and that is unusual." Peters was close friends with Marilyn Monroe, who also worked for Fox. Other actors she befriended during her career were Joseph Cotten, David Niven, Ray Milland, Marie McDonald, and especially Jeanne Crain.

In 1954, Peters married Texas oilman Stuart Cramer (grandson of Stuart W. Cramer). At the time they married, they had known each other for only a few weeks, and they separated a few months later. Much talk indicated Peters might be retiring from the screen, but the actress insisted that after her eight-week leave from Fox, she was to return to Hollywood.

Decorated soldier and actor Audie Murphy met Peters when both were students at the Actors Lab. They had a very warm affair in 1946; during this time, she met Howard Hughes.

In 1957, after her divorce from Cramer, Peters married Howard Hughes. Soon after that, he retreated from public view and reportedly started becoming an eccentric recluse. The couple had met in the 1940s, before Peters became a film actress. Their highly publicized romance in 1947 brought talk of marriage, but Peters said that she could not combine it with her career. Columnist Jack Anderson claimed that Peters was "the only woman [Hughes] ever loved." He reportedly had his security officers follow her everywhere, even when they were not in a relationship. Actor Max Showalter confirmed this, after becoming a close friend of Peters' during shooting of Niagara (1953).

During her marriage, which lasted from 1957 to 1971, Peters retired from acting and social events in Hollywood. According to a 1969 article, she went through life unrecognized, despite being protected by Hughes's security officers all day. Living in anonymity was easy, according to Peters, because she "didn't act like an actress." Later during the marriage, Peters reportedly was frequently involved in activities such as charitable work, arts and crafts, and university studies, including psychology and anthropology at UCLA.

In 1971, Peters and Hughes divorced. She agreed to a lifetime alimony payment of $70,000 ($560,000 today) annually, adjusted for inflation, and she waived all claims to Hughes's estate, then worth several billion dollars. In the media, she refused to speak about the marriage, claiming she preferred to focus on the present and future. She said that she hoped to avoid being known as Mrs. Howard Hughes for the rest of her life, although that would be difficult. "I'm a realist. I know what the score is, and I know who the superstar is."

Later in 1971, Peters married Stan Hough, an executive with 20th Century Fox. They were married until Hough's death in 1990.

== Death ==
Peters died of leukemia on October 13, 2000, two days before her 74th birthday, in Carlsbad, California. She was buried at the Holy Cross Cemetery in Culver City, California.

== Filmography ==
Film
Year	Title	Role	Notes
1947	Captain from Castile	Catana Perez	
1948	Deep Waters	Ann Freeman	
1949	It Happens Every Spring	Deborah Greenleaf	
1950	Love That Brute	Ruth Manning	
1951	As Young as You Feel	Alice Hodges	
1951	Take Care of My Little Girl	Dallas Prewitt	
1951	Anne of the Indies	Captain Anne Providence	
1952	Viva Zapata!	Josefa Zapata	
1952	Wait till the Sun Shines, Nellie	Nellie Halper	
1952	Lure of the Wilderness	Laurie Harper	
1952	O. Henry's Full House	Susan Goodwin	segment "The Last Leaf"
1953	Niagara	Polly Cutler	
1953	Pickup on South Street	Candy	
1953	A Blueprint for Murder	Lynne Cameron	
1953	Vicki	Vicki Lynn	
1954	Three Coins in the Fountain	Anita Hutchins	
1954	Apache	Nalinle	
1954	Broken Lance	Barbara	
1955	A Man Called Peter	Catherine Wood Marshall	
Television
Year	Title	Role	Notes
1973	Winesburg, Ohio	Elizabeth Willard	Television movie
1976	Arthur Hailey's the Moneychangers	Beatrice Heyward	Miniseries
1981	Peter and Paul	Priscilla	Television movie
1988	Murder, She Wrote	Siobhan O'Dea	1 episode

== Radio appearances ==
Year	Program	Episode/source
1953	Lux Radio Theatre	Wait 'Till the Sun Shines, Nellie
1954	Lux Radio Theatre	The Day the Earth Stood Still
