= Vicki (film) =

1953 film by Harry Horner

- Theatrical release poster
- Directed by: Harry Horner
- Screenplay by: Dwight Taylor
- Based on: I Wake Up Screaming; 1941 novel by Steve Fisher
- Produced by: Leonard Goldstein
- Starring: Jeanne Crain; Jean Peters
- Cinematography: Milton R. Krasner
- Edited by: Dorothy Spencer
- Music by: Leigh Harline
- Color process: Black and white
- Production company: 20th Century Fox
- Distributed by: 20th Century-Fox
- Release date: October 5, 1953
- Running time: 85 minutes
- Country: United States
- Language: English
- Budget: $560,000

Vicki is a 1953 American film noir directed by Harry Horner and starring Jeanne Crain and Jean Peters. It was based on the novel I Wake Up Screaming, written by Steve Fisher.

== Plot ==
Vicki Lynn (Jean Peters) is a waitress who is transformed into a fashion model by press agent Steve Christopher (Elliott Reid). When Vicki is murdered, Detective Ed Cornell (Richard Boone) is determined to blame the crime on Christopher. In fact, Cornell is so hopelessly in love with the dead girl Vicki, who despised him, that he intends to railroad an innocent man to the electric chair. With the help of Vicki's sister Jill (Jeanne Crain), Christopher tracks down the real killer, Harry Williams (Aaron Spelling), and exposes Cornell, who had covered up for Williams after he murdered Vicki.

== Cast ==
- Jeanne Crain as Jill Lynn
- Jean Peters as Vicki Lynn
- Elliott Reid as Steve Christopher
- Richard Boone as Lt. Ed Cornell
- Max Showalter as Larry Evans (as Casey Adams)
- Alexander D'Arcy as Robin Ray (as Alex D'Arcy)
- Carl Betz as Detective MacDonald
- Aaron Spelling as Harry Williams
- John Dehner as Captain J. Donald

== Background ==
Vicki is a remake of the 1941 film I Wake Up Screaming starring Betty Grable, Victor Mature, and Carole Landis.

== Reception ==
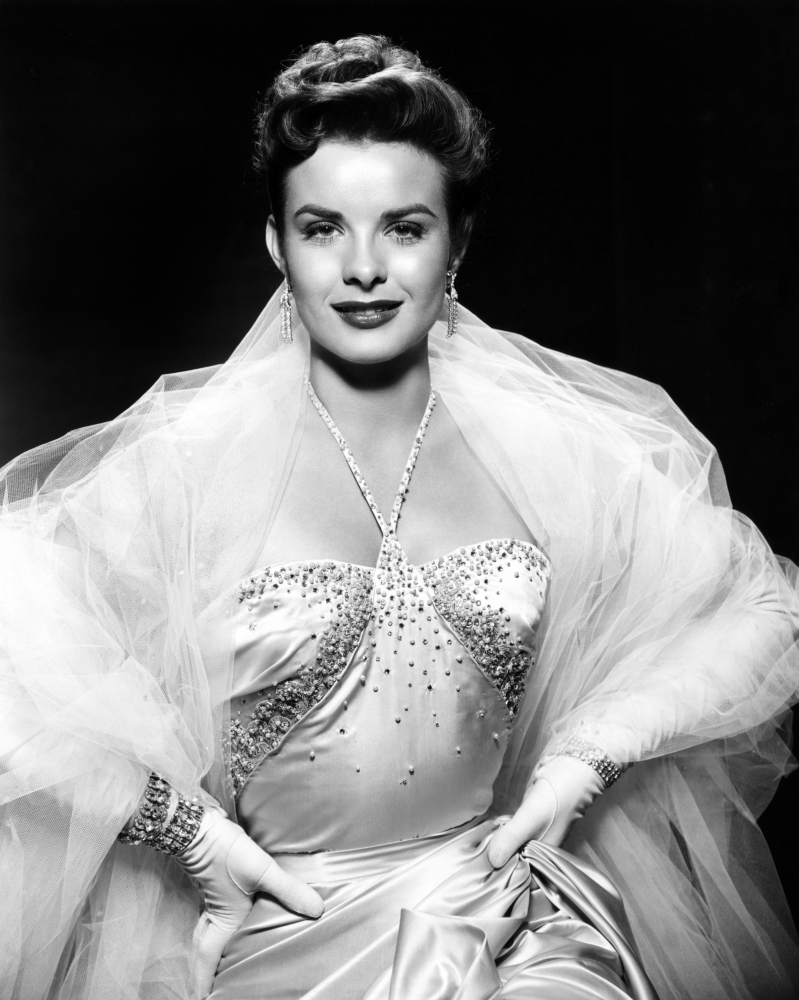
Peters in a promotional photo for the film

New York Times film critic Bosley Crowther did not like the screenplay, but appreciated the acting. He wrote:

Meanwhile, the rest of the performers—Jean Peters, as the girl who gets killed; Jeanne Crain, as her misgiving sister; Mr. Reid and several more—make the best of Harry Horner's brisk direction to make it look as though they're playing a tingling film. It might be, indeed, if the story were not so studiously contrived and farfetched, and if Mr. Boone did not wear a label that virtually says, 'I'm IT.'
