= Born Yesterday =

Born Yesterday may refer to:

- Born Yesterday (play), a 1946 Broadway play by Garson Kanin
  - Born Yesterday (1950 film), a film directed by George Cukor
  - Born Yesterday (1956 film), a TV film directed by Garson Kanin
  - Born Yesterday (1993 film), a film directed by Luis Mandoki
- Born Yesterday (album), a 1985 album by The Everly Brothers
- Born Yesterday (song), a song by The Everly Brothers
- "Born Yesterday", a song by Quadeca from the 2022 album I Didn't Mean to Haunt You
- Born Yesterday, an episode from season 3 of Bluey

== See also ==
- I Wasn't Born Yesterday, a 1991 album by singer Sa-Fire
