= Queen of the Nile =

Queen of the Nile may refer to:

- A common epithet for Cleopatra, Queen of ancient Egypt
- "Queen of the Nile" (The Twilight Zone), an episode of The Twilight Zone
- Queen of the Nile (film), a 1961 epic film starring Jeanne Crain and Vincent Price
- A song by the hard rock band Dangerous Toys
- Cleopatra: Queen of the Nile, an expansion pack for Pharaoh, a video game
