= Jeanne Crain =

American actress (1925–2003)

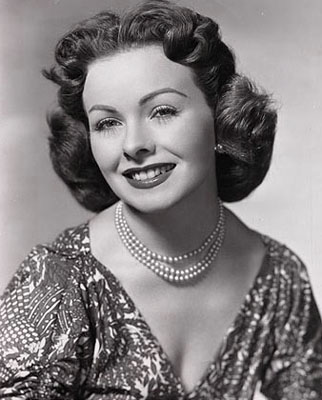
- Crain in 1953
- Born: Jeanne Elizabeth Crain; May 25, 1925; Barstow, California, U.S.
- Died: December 14, 2003 (aged 78); Santa Barbara, California, U.S.
- Resting place: Santa Barbara Cemetery
- Other name: Jeanne Crain Brinkman
- Education: Inglewood High School
- Occupation: Actress
- Years active: 1943–1972
- Known for: Pinky; In the Meantime, Darling; State Fair; Leave Her to Heaven; Margie; A Letter to Three Wives
- Spouse: Paul Brinkman (m. 1945; died 2003)
- Children: 7

Jeanne Elizabeth Crain (May 25, 1925 – December 14, 2003) was an American actress. She was nominated for an Academy Award for Best Actress for the title role in Pinky (1949). She also starred in the films In the Meantime, Darling (1944), State Fair (1945), Leave Her to Heaven (1945), Centennial Summer (1946), Margie (1946), Apartment for Peggy (1948), A Letter to Three Wives (1949), Cheaper by the Dozen (1950), People Will Talk (1951), Man Without a Star (1955), Gentlemen Marry Brunettes (1955), The Fastest Gun Alive (1956), and The Joker Is Wild (1957).

== Early life ==
Jeanne Elizabeth Crain was born in Barstow, California, to George A. Crain, a high-school English teacher, and Loretta Crain, née Carr. Both of Crain's parents were Catholics of Irish descent. By 1930, they were living in Inglewood, California, at 822 S. Walnut Avenue. When her parents divorced in 1934, her mother, her sister Rita Marie (who served as Crain's stand-in during the mid-1940s), and she moved to 5817 Van Ness Avenue in Los Angeles.

Crain began winning leads in school plays at 14 and beauty contests at 15. A skilled ice skater, she first attracted attention when she was crowned Miss Pan-Pacific at the Pan-Pacific Auditorium in Los Angeles. She attended Inglewood High School, where her father was head of the English department. While still in high school, she was asked to do a screen test with Orson Welles, but she did not get the part. After high school, she enrolled at UCLA to study drama. In 1943 at age 18, she appeared in a bit part in the film The Gang's All Here, produced by 20th Century Fox.

== Career ==
=== 20th Century Fox ===
At age 19 Crain was cast by Fox in her first sizable role in the romantic drama Home in Indiana (1944), with Walter Brennan, in which she played the love interest of Lon McCallister's character. The film, shot in Technicolor, was popular at the box office and established Crain as a film name.

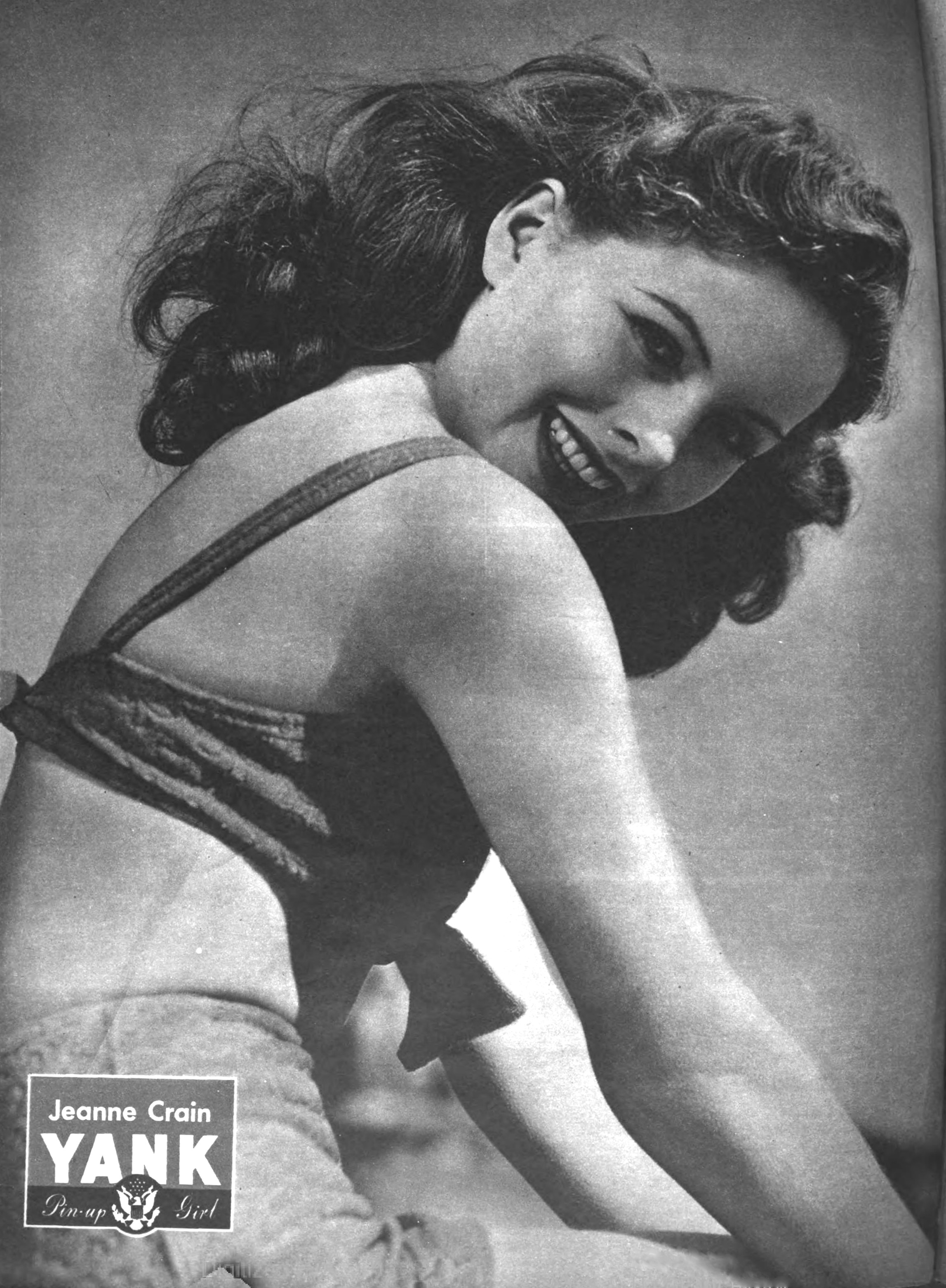
Crain on the cover of Yank magazine, August 1945

Darryl F. Zanuck, head of Fox, gave Crain top billing in In the Meantime, Darling (1944), directed by Otto Preminger, in which she played a war bride. Her acting was critically panned, but she gained nationwide attention. It resulted in her landing the lead role in The Shocking Miss Pilgrim in October 1944, a musical film that was eventually made with Betty Grable as the star.

Crain first received critical acclaim when she starred in Winged Victory (1944). She co-starred in 1945 with Dana Andrews in the musical film State Fair, for which Louanne Hogan dubbed Crain's singing. After that, Crain often had singing parts in films, and they were invariably dubbed, usually by Hogan.

State Fair was a hit, as was Leave Her to Heaven (1945), in which Crain played the "good" sister of her "bad" sibling, played by Gene Tierney, both of whom are in love with Cornel Wilde's character. Crain became established as one of Fox's bigger stars—so much so that Zanuck refused to let her play the comparatively small part of Clementine in My Darling Clementine (1946).

Crain and Wilde were reunited in Centennial Summer (1946), directed by Preminger, Fox's attempt to match the success of MGM's Meet Me in St. Louis (1944). More popular was Margie (1946), which displayed her ice-skating ability when Conrad Janis and she danced around the ice rink while her boyfriend, played by Alan Young, slipped and stumbled after them.

She made two films in 1948: You Were Meant for Me, a musical with Dan Dailey that may have included Marilyn Monroe's first film appearance, and Apartment for Peggy with William Holden.

=== Career peak ===
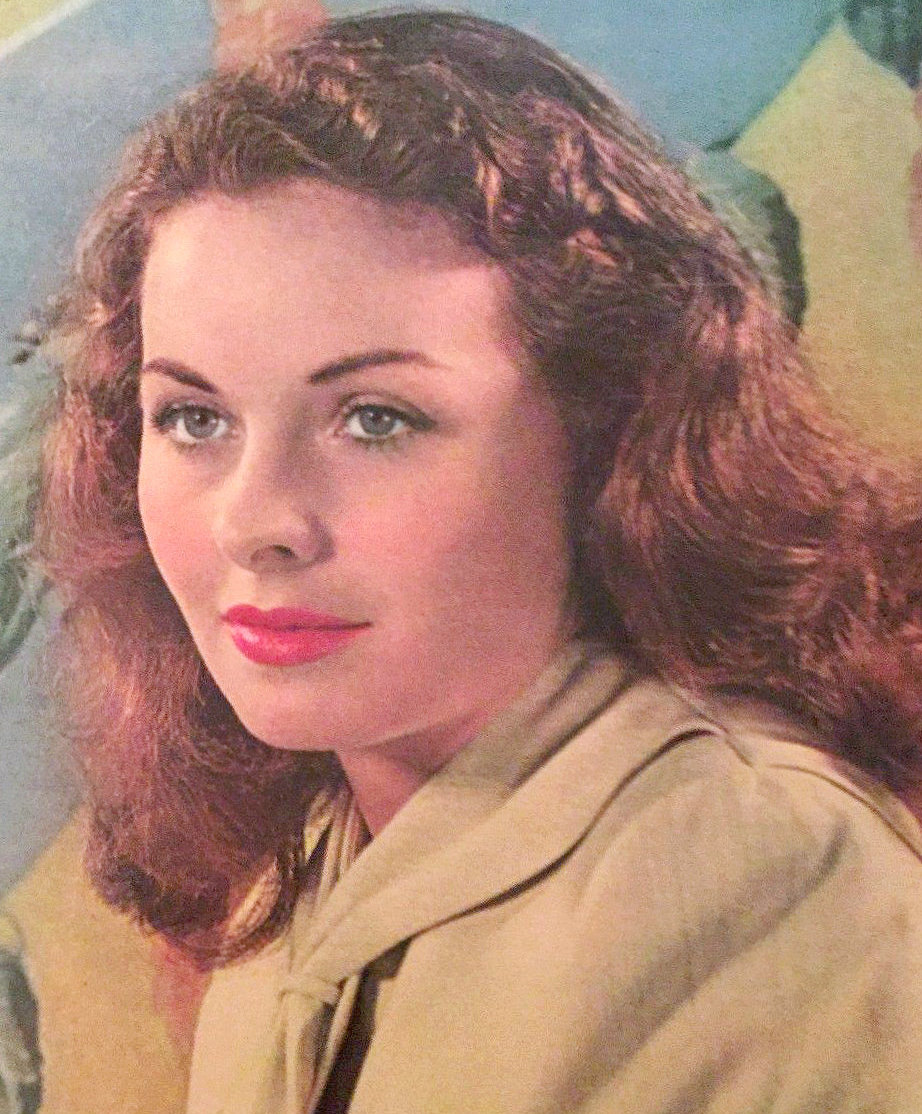
Crain on cover of 1948 New York Sunday News magazine

In 1949, Crain appeared in three films. A Letter to Three Wives, in which she was top billed, was a solid box-office hit that won Joseph L. Mankiewicz two Oscars and is considered a classic. The Fan, directed by Preminger and based on Lady Windermere's Fan by Oscar Wilde, was poorly received. Pinky brought Crain a nomination for the Academy Award for Best Actress and was one of the year's more popular films, but it was controversial. It told the story of a light-skinned African American woman who passed for white in the Northern United States. Although Lena Horne and other black actresses were considered, producer Darryl F. Zanuck chose to cast a white actress for fear of racial backlash.

Crain had another big success when she starred with Myrna Loy and Clifton Webb in the 1950 biographical film Cheaper by the Dozen, although hers was more of a supporting role. She had a cameo as herself in I'll Get By (1951) and starred in Take Care of My Little Girl (1951), a mildly popular drama about snobbery in college sororities.

Next, Crain was paired with Cary Grant in Joseph L. Mankiewicz's offbeat comedy/drama People Will Talk (1951). Despite Crain's intense campaigning for the female lead, Anne Baxter was initially cast in the part; when Baxter became pregnant Crain ended up with the role.

Shortly after, Crain starred in Charles Brackett's production of The Model and the Marriage Broker (1951). Cast in May 1951, she was Brackett's first choice. She was reunited with Loy for Belles on Their Toes (1952), the sequel to Cheaper by the Dozen, and received top billing this time.

While still at 20th Century Fox, Crain played a young wife losing her mind amid high-seas intrigue in Dangerous Crossing (1953), co-starring Michael Rennie. She starred in Vicki (1953), a remake of I Wake Up Screaming; and Fox tried her in a Western, City of Bad Men (1954). Both films performed only mildly at the box office, and Crain left the studio.

=== Freelancing ===
Crain worked for a number of studios after leaving Fox. She made Duel in the Jungle (1954) in Britain, released in the U.S. by Warner Bros., and then Man Without a Star (1955), a Western with Kirk Douglas at Universal, as the lead female role of a hard-nosed ranch owner.

She showed her dancing skills in 1955's Gentlemen Marry Brunettes, a quasisequel to Gentlemen Prefer Blondes based on Anita Loos' novel and co-starring Jane Russell. An independent production, it was released in the U.S. by United Artists. Later in the 1950s, Crain, Russell, and another actress formed a short-lived singing and dancing lounge act on the Las Vegas Strip.

Crain made the Western comedy The Second Greatest Sex (1956), again for Universal, then starred with Glenn Ford, Russ Tamblyn, and Broderick Crawford in The Fastest Gun Alive, an MGM production directed by Russell Rouse. It was a big hit. At Universal,, she starred with Jeff Chandler in the thriller The Tattered Dress (1957) and then played a socialite who helps floundering singer and comedian Joe E. Lewis (Frank Sinatra) redeem himself in The Joker Is Wild (1957) by Paramount.

At this time Crain began working in television, playing Daisy in a 1958 adaptation of The Great Gatsby and Rose in 1959's all-star production of Meet Me in St. Louis alongside Myrna Loy, Walter Pidgeon, Jane Powell, Ed Wynn, and top-billed Tab Hunter.

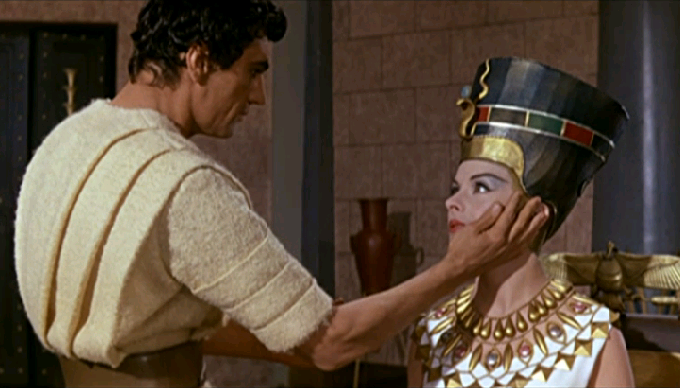
Crain and Edmund Purdom in Queen of the Nile (1961)

=== Later career ===
Crain appeared in fewer films in the 1960s as she entered semiretirement. She starred as Nefertiti in the Italian production of Queen of the Nile (1961), with Edmund Purdom and Vincent Price, and in Madison Avenue (1962), with Dana Andrews and Eleanor Parker. During this period, Crain appeared—for the second time—as a mystery guest on What's My Line? and made guest appearances on Riverboat and Burke's Law.

She again co-starred with Dana Andrews in Hot Rods To Hell (1967). Her last films were The Night God Screamed (1971) and Skyjacked (1972) with Charlton Heston.

== Personal life ==
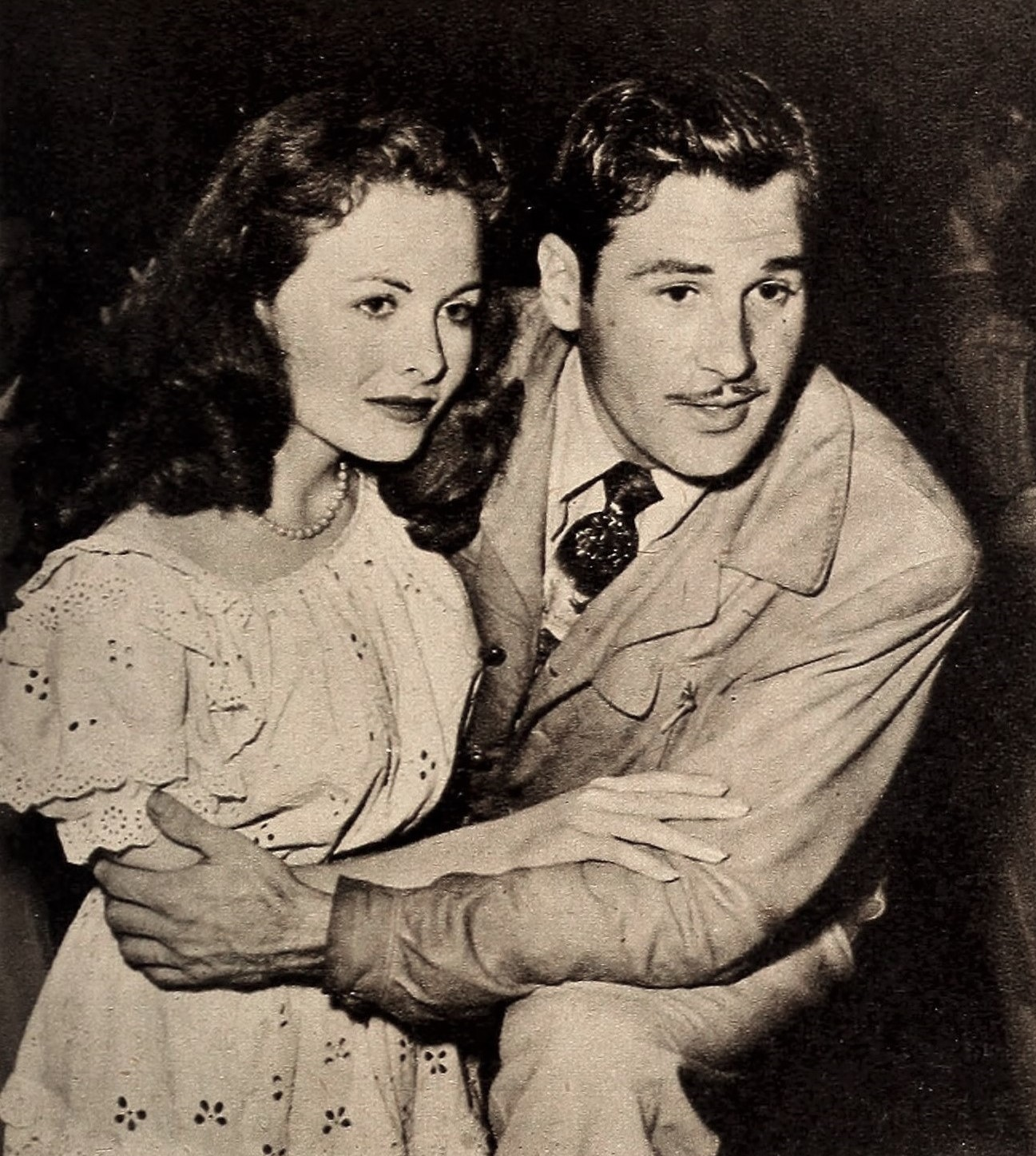
Crain dancing with her husband Paul Brinkman at the Mocambo, 1946

At the height of her stardom in the late 1940s and early 1950s, Crain was known as "Hollywood's Number One party girl", and she was quoted as saying she was invited to at least 200 parties a year. She was a devout Catholic.

Against her mother's wishes, on December 31, 1945, Crain married Paul Brinkman, a former contract player at RKO Pictures, who was credited as Paul Brooks. He later became a top executive with an arms-manufacturing company. In the mid-1950s the marriage became rocky, and Crain obtained an interlocutory divorce decree. Each claimed the other was unfaithful, and she alleged that he was abusive. However, they reconciled on December 31, 1956, and remained married. They had seven children. Although they later lived separately in Santa Barbara County, they maintained an amicable relationship, with Brinkman visiting Crain about once a month and on her birthday. Brinkman died in October 2003.

Crain died on December 14, 2003, of a heart attack, aged 78. Her funeral mass was held at the Santa Barbara Mission. She is buried next to her husband under the name Jeanne Crain Brinkman.

== Legacy ==
Crain's career is documented in the Jeanne Crain Collection of memorabilia assembled by Charles J. Finlay, a longtime 20th Century Fox publicist, at the Cinema Archives at Wesleyan University in Middletown, Connecticut. Her son, Paul F. Brinkman Jr., a television executive, is most known for his work on the series JAG.

== Filmography ==
=== Film ===
Year	Title	Role	Notes
1943	The Gang's All Here	Chorus Girl / Pool Party Guest	uncredited
1944	Home in Indiana	'Char' Bruce	
1944	In the Meantime, Darling	Margaret 'Maggie' Preston	
1944	Winged Victory	Helen	
1945	State Fair	Margy Frake	a.k.a. Rodgers and Hammerstein's State Fair also soundtrack
1945	Leave Her to Heaven	Ruth Berent	
1946	Centennial Summer	Julia Rogers	also soundtrack
1946	Margie	Marjorie 'Margie' MacDuff	also soundtrack
1948	You Were Meant for Me	Peggy Mayhew	
1948	Apartment for Peggy	Peggy Taylor	also soundtrack
1949	A Letter to Three Wives	Deborah Bishop	
1949	The Fan	Lady Margaret 'Meg' Windermere	a.k.a. Lady Windermere's Fan
1949	Pinky	Patricia 'Pinky' Johnson	nominated for Academy Award for Best Actress
1950	Cheaper by the Dozen	Anne Gilbreth	
1950	I'll Get By	Herself	uncredited cameo
1951	Take Care of My Little Girl	Elizabeth 'Liz' Erickson	
1951	People Will Talk	Deborah Higgins	
1951	The Model and the Marriage Broker	Kitty Bennett	
1952	Belles on Their Toes	Anne Gilbreth	a.k.a. Belles on Their Toes: The Further Adventures of the Gilbreth Family
1952	O. Henry's Full House	Della Young	segment: "The Gift of the Magi"
1953	Dangerous Crossing	Ruth Stanton Bowman	
1953	Vicki	Jill Lynn	
1953	City of Bad Men	Linda Culligan	
1954	Duel in the Jungle	Marian Taylor	
1955	Man Without a Star	Reed Bowman	
1955	Gentlemen Marry Brunettes	Connie Jones / Mitzi Jones	also soundtrack
1955	The Second Greatest Sex	Liza McClure	also soundtrack
1956	The Fastest Gun Alive	Dora Temple	
1957	The Tattered Dress	Diane Blane	
1957	The Joker Is Wild	Letty Page	a.k.a. All the Way
1960	Guns of the Timberland	Laura Riley	
1961	Madison Avenue	Peggy Shannon	
1961	Twenty Plus Two	Linda Foster	a.k.a. It Started in Tokyo
1961	Queen of the Nile	Tenet/Nefertiti	a.k.a. Nefertiti, Queen of the Nile
1962	Pontius Pilate	Claudia Procula	
1963	Invasion 1700	Helena Kurcewiczówna	a.k.a. Daggers of Blood and With Fire and Sword
1967	Hot Rods to Hell	Peg Phillips	a.k.a. 52 Miles to Terror
1971	The Night God Screamed	Fanny Pierce	a.k.a. Scream
1972	Skyjacked	Mrs. Clara Shaw	a.k.a. Sky Terror

=== Television ===
Year	Title	Role	Notes
1955	Star Stage	Nancy	1 episode
1956	The Ford Television Theatre	Joyce Randall	1 episode
1958	The Great Gatsby	Daisy Buchanan	Television play
1958	Schlitz Playhouse of Stars	Ruth Elliot	1 episode
1958	What's My Line	Herself	1 episode
1959	Meet Me in St. Louis	Rose Smith	TV movie
1959	Goodyear Theatre	Lila Babrek Barnes	1 episode
1959	Riverboat	Laura Sutton	1 episode
1960-62	G.E. True	Hope/Marion Miller	3 episodes
1963	The Dick Powell Show	Elsie	1 episode
1964-65	Burke's Law	Amy Booth / Lorraine Turner / Polly Martin	3 episodes
1968	The Danny Thomas Hour	Frances Merrill	1 episode
1968	The Name of the Game	Mrs. McKendricks	1 episode
1972	Owen Marshall: Counselor at Law	Lily MacMurdy	1 episode

== Radio performances ==
Year	Program	Episode/source
1951	Suspense	The Case Study of a Murderer
1952	Lux Radio Theatre	Take Care of My Little Girl
1953	Lux Radio Theatre	You're My Everything
1953	Lux Summer Theatre	One More Spring

=== Awards and nominations ===
Awards
Year	Award	Category	Production	Result
1949	Academy Awards	Academy Award for Best Actress	Pinky	Nominated

== Sources ==
- Girl Next Door: The Life and Career of Jeanne Crain by Rupert Alistair CreateSpace ISBN 9781976152658 ISBN 1976152658
