= Wait till the Sun Shines, Nellie (film) =

1952 film by Henry King

- Directed by: Henry King
- Written by: Maxwell Shane; Allan Scott (adaptation)
- Based on: I Hear Them Sing by Ferdinand Reyher
- Produced by: George Jessel
- Starring: David Wayne; Jean Peters; Hugh Marlowe; Albert Dekker; Helene Stanley; Tommy Morton; Joyce MacKenzie; Alan Hale, Jr. Richard Karlan
- Cinematography: Leon Shamroy
- Edited by: Barbara McLean
- Music by: Alfred Newman
- Production company: 20th Century-Fox
- Distributed by: 20th Century-Fox
- Release date: July 1952
- Running time: 108 minutes
- Country: United States
- Language: English
- Box office: $1.25 million (US rentals)

Wait till the Sun Shines, Nellie is a 1952 American historical drama film directed by Henry King and starring Jean Peters, David Wayne and Hugh Marlowe, Sharing the name of a popular 1905 song, it charts the life of an Illinois family between the 1890s and 1920s.

== Plot ==
Expecting to honeymoon in Chicago and live there, newlywed Nellie is disappointed when she and Ben Halper disembark from their train at a small town in Illinois, where he has chosen to live and run a barber shop.

Ben lies to his wife, claiming the shop is only rented, as is their home, when he has actually purchased both. Nellie gives birth to their two children, but wants so much to see Chicago that when Ben is away, she accepts an offer from Ed Jordan, a hardware store owner, to visit the big city together. In a train wreck, Nellie is killed.

The thought that his wife might have been unfaithful haunts Ben over the coming years. His children grow up, and Ben Jr. decides against his father's wishes to go to Chicago as a dancer in a vaudeville act.

Ben becomes a grandfather and his son serves in World War I, where he is injured and can no longer dance. Ben Jr. takes a job with a Chicago racketeer named Mike Kava, to his father's shame. One day, both Ben Jr. and his boss are gunned down by machine guns.

An elderly Ben Halper looks back on his life with regret, his greatest remaining pleasure being that his granddaughter, Nellie, grows up to strongly resemble the woman he long ago married.

== Cast ==
- Jean Peters as Nellie Halper
- David Wayne as Ben Halper
- Hugh Marlowe as Ed Jordan
- Albert Dekker as Lloyd Slocum
- Helene Stanley as Eadie Jordan
- Tommy Morton as Benny Halper, Jr.
- Joyce MacKenzie as Bessie Jordan
- Alan Hale, Jr. as George Oliphant
- Richard Karlan as Mike Kava
- William Walker as Robert Waverly Ferris
