= Pickup on South Street =

1953 film by Samuel Fuller

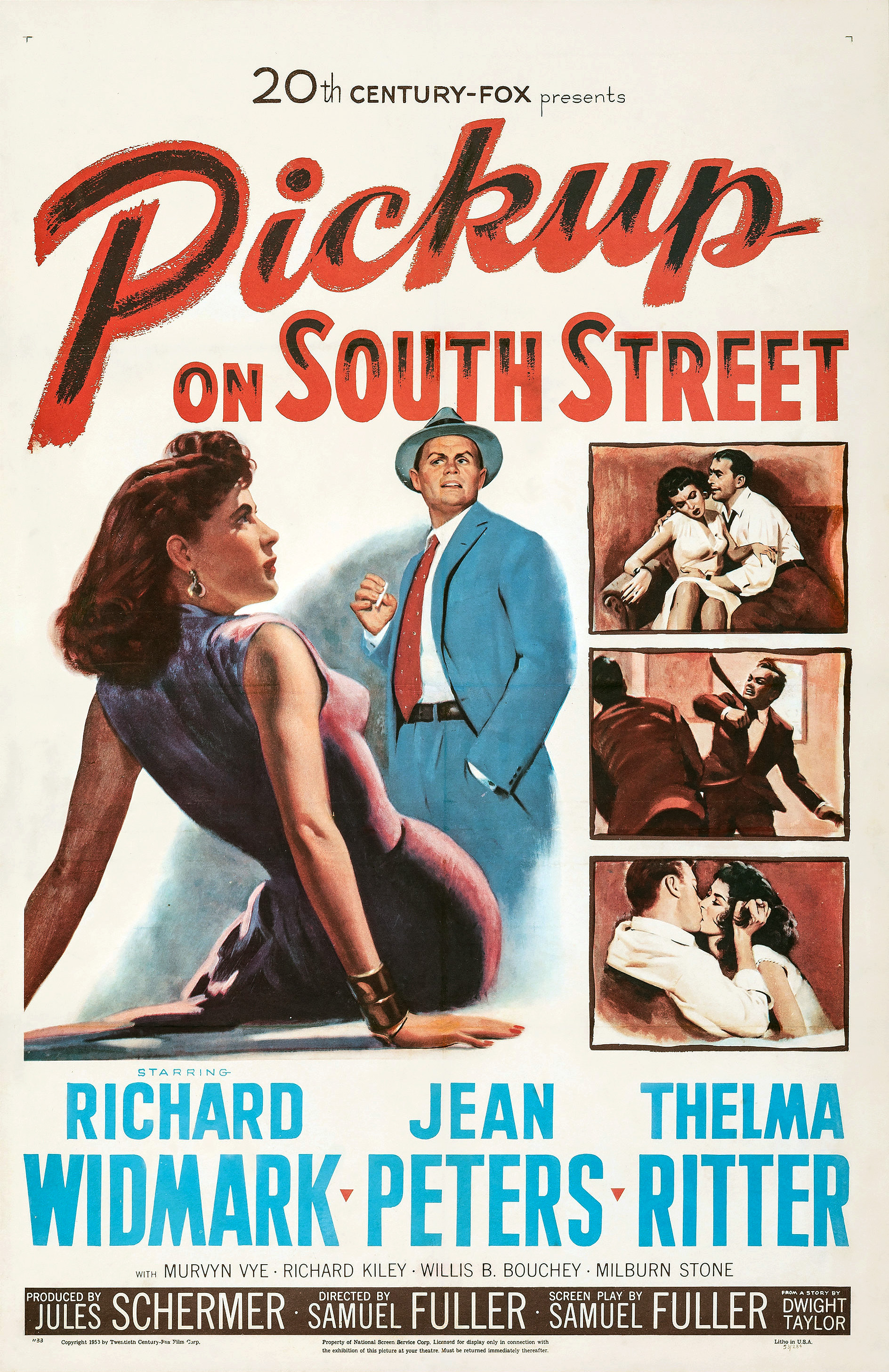
- Theatrical release poster
- Directed by: Samuel Fuller
- Screenplay by: Samuel Fuller
- Story by: Dwight Taylor
- Produced by: Jules Schermer
- Starring: Richard Widmark; Jean Peters; Thelma Ritter; Murvyn Vye; Richard Kiley; Willis Bouchey; Milburn Stone
- Cinematography: Joseph MacDonald
- Edited by: Nick DeMaggio
- Music by: Leigh Harline
- Distributed by: 20th Century-Fox
- Release date: May 27, 1953
- Running time: 80 minutes
- Country: United States
- Language: English
- Budget: $780,000
- Box office: $1,900,000

Pickup on South Street is a 1953 American spy film noir written and directed by Samuel Fuller, and starring Richard Widmark, Jean Peters, and Thelma Ritter. Widmark plays a pickpocket who unwittingly steals a covert microfilm sought by foreign agents. The film combines elements of the traditional crime film noir with Cold War-era espionage drama. It was released by 20th Century-Fox.

The film was screened at the 14th Venice International Film Festival, where it won the Bronze Lion. Thelma Ritter's performance earned her an Academy Award nomination for Best Supporting Actress. In 2018, Pickup on South Street was selected for preservation in the United States National Film Registry as being "culturally, historically, or aesthetically significant."

== Plot ==
On a crowded New York City subway train pickpocket Skip McCoy steals Candy's wallet. Unbeknownst to either it contains microfilm of top-secret government information. Candy was delivering an envelope as a final favor to her ex-boyfriend Joey, who told her that it contained stolen business secrets.

Government agent Zara had Candy under surveillance, hoping she would lead him to the top man in a Communist spy ring. He seeks police help identifying the pickpocket. Captain Dan Tiger has professional informant Moe Williams brought in. She asks Zara several questions about the pickpocket's technique, negotiates a price, and gives Tiger a list of names; Zara quickly identifies Skip from his mug shot. He tries to get Skip to give up the film, revealing its importance and appealing to his patriotism, but Skip denies he has it and laughs in his face.

Meanwhile, Joey persuades a reluctant Candy to track down the thief on her own. The trail leads to Moe, who is delighted to be able to sell the same information again.

Candy searches Skip's waterfront shack that night while he is out. Spotting only a flashlight when he returns, he knocks the prowler out. When Candy comes to, she tries to get the film but fails.

The second time she visits she is puzzled when he calls her a "Commie" and "a Red" and demands $25,000 for the film. He reveals that he knows what is on it. Skip thinks she is only acting. Despite his rough treatment she finds herself falling for him.

When she returns to Joey, his superior gives him a day to get the film back and leaves him a gun. Candy finally realizes the truth. She turns to Moe for help, since Skip will not believe her if she warns him he is in danger. Moe tries to convince Skip to give the film to the government but fails. She goes home and finds Joey waiting for her. She refuses to give him Skip's address and reveals she knows about the Communist plot. Joey shoots her dead.

The next morning Skip returns home to find Candy there. She blames herself for Moe's death, and is dismayed that he is still willing to trade with the Commies. When he starts to leave with the film, she knocks him out with a bottle and takes it to Zara and Tiger. Zara asks her to give it to Joey so he can lead them to his boss. Candy does, but Joey notices there is a frame missing. He beats her in an attempt to get Skip's address, then shoots her as she tries to flee. Rifling her purse, he finds the address.

Skip learns of Candy's beating and visits her in the hospital, comforting her with a romantic kiss.

Joey and his boss go to the shack, but Skip hears them coming and hides underneath. When Joey is ordered to deliver the film as is, Skip follows him to a subway station. He watches as an envelope is exchanged in a restroom, then knocks out the courier and chases after and beats up Joey.

Later, at the police station, Tiger predicts Skip will louse up his pardon and return to his criminal ways. A defiant Candy, arm in arm with her new love, says that is not the way it will be.

== Cast ==
- Richard Widmark as Skip McCoy
- Jean Peters as Candy
- Thelma Ritter as Moe Williams
- Murvyn Vye as Captain Dan "Tiger"
- Richard Kiley as Joey
- Willis Bouchey as Zara
- Milburn Stone as Winoki
- Vic Perry as Lightning Louie a.k.a. "Godkin"
- Harry Carter as Detective Dietrich
- George E. Stone as Willie, police desk clerk
- George Eldredge as Fenton
- John Gallaudet as Detective Lieutenant Campion
- Parley Baer as Heavyset HQ Communist
- Stuart Randall as Detective

== Production ==
Darryl F. Zanuck showed Fuller, who was then under contract with 20th Century-Fox, a script by Dwight Taylor called Blaze of Glory about a woman lawyer falling in love with a criminal she was defending in a murder trial. Fuller liked the idea but knew from his previous crime reporter experience that courtroom cases take a long time to play out. Fuller asked Zanuck if he could write a story of a lower criminal and his girlfriend that he originally titled Pickpocket but Zanuck thought the title too "European".

Fuller had memories of South Street from his days as a crime reporter and came up with his new title. Fuller met Detective Dan Campion of the New York Police Department (who had served on the pickpocket squad since 1929) to research the background material of his story to add realism, with Fuller basing the role of "Tiger", the police detective, on Campion who had been suspended without salary for six months for manhandling a suspect.

Fuller turned down many actresses for the lead role including studio favorites Marilyn Monroe; Shelley Winters; Ava Gardner, who looked too glamorous; Betty Grable, who wanted a dance number written in; and initially Jean Peters, whom he did not like when he saw film of her in Captain from Castile. With only a week to go before the film started production, Fuller saw Peters walk into the studio's commissary while having lunch. Fuller noticed Peters walked with a slightly bow-legged style that many prostitutes also had. Fuller was impressed with Peters' intelligence, spunkiness, and different roles at the studio when he tested her the Friday before shooting started on the Monday. When Betty Grable insisted on being in the film and threatened to cause problems, Fuller threatened to walk off the film. Peters got the role.

In August 1952, the script was deemed unacceptable by the Production Code, by reason of "excessive brutality and sadistic beatings, of both men and women", including a vicious beating the character "Candy" (Peters) receives from ex-boyfriend and Communist operative "Joey" (Kiley). Although a revised script was accepted soon after, the studio was forced to shoot multiple takes of a particular scene where Peters and Kiley frisked each other for loot as being too risqué.

The French release of the movie removed any reference to spies and microfilm in the dubbed version. They called the movie Le Port de la Drogue (Drug's harbour). The managers of 20th Century-Fox thought that the theme of communist spies was too controversial in a country (France) where the Communist Party was an influential and legitimate part of public life.

FBI director J. Edgar Hoover had lunch with Fuller and Zanuck, and said how much he detested Fuller's work and especially Pickup on South Street. Hoover objected to Widmark's unpatriotic character especially his line "Are you waving the flag at me?". Zanuck backed Fuller up, telling Hoover he knew nothing about making movies, but removed references to the FBI in the film's advertising, which is also never mentioned by name in the film.

== Adaptations ==
In June 1954, Ritter co-starred alongside Terry Moore and Stephen McNally in a Lux Radio Theatre presentation of the story. 20th Century-Fox remade the film in 1967 as The Cape Town Affair, directed by Robert D. Webb and starring Claire Trevor (in the Thelma Ritter role), James Brolin (in his first leading role), and Jacqueline Bisset.

== Reception ==
=== Critical response ===
When the film was released, reviews were somewhat mixed. Bosley Crowther wrote:

It looks very much as though someone is trying to out-bulldoze Mickey Spillane in Twentieth Century-Fox's Pickup on South Street, ... this highly embroidered presentation of a slice of life in the New York underworld not only returns Richard Widmark to a savage, arrogant role, but also uses Jean Peters blandly as an all-comers' human punching-bag. Violence bursts in every sequence, and the conversation is slangy and corrupt. Even the genial Thelma Ritter plays a stool pigeon who gets her head blown off ... Sensations he has in abundance and, in the delivery of them, Mr. Widmark, Miss Peters, Miss Ritter and all the others in the cast do very well. Murvyn Vye, as a cynical detective, is particularly caustic and good, and several other performers in lesser roles give the thing a certain tone.

The staff at Variety magazine also had a mixed response:

If Pickup on South Street makes any point at all, it's that there is nothing really wrong with pickpockets, even when they are given to violence, as long as they don't play footsie with Communist spies ... Film's assets are partly its photography, which creates an occasional tense atmosphere, and partly the performance of Thelma Ritter, the only halfway convincing figure in an otherwise unconvincing cast ... Widmark is given a chance to repeat on his snarling menace characterization followed by a look-what-love-can-do-to-a-bad-boy act as Widmark's hard-boiled soul melts before Peters' romancing.

In recent years, critical appraisals of Pickup have warmed considerably. The movie has a 93% rating on Rotten Tomatoes from 40 reviews with an average score of 7.8/10. The consensus summarizes: "Powerfully acted and satisfyingly dark, Pickup on South Street is a Cold War noir that moves confidently to the rhythm of city street life." Roger Ebert regards Pickup as one of Fuller's "noir classics."

In 2000 Rick Thompson suggested that Pickup may have been the basis of Robert Bresson's Pickpocket (1959), with which it shares many themes:

... including the death of the mother-figure; the hero's problem making commitment to the potential lover; a series of philosophical dialogues between the hero and his police antagonist; the interlinking of pickpocketing and sexuality; and the construction of the pickpocket hero as an extreme and deliberate outsider."

=== Nominations ===
- Academy Awards: Oscar, Best Actress in a Supporting Role, Thelma Ritter, 1953.
- Venice Film Festival: Golden Lion, Samuel Fuller, 1954.

== Preservation ==
The Academy Film Archive preserved Pickup on South Street in 2002.
