= Take Care of My Little Girl =

1951 film by Jean Negulesco

- Theatrical poster
- Directed by: Jean Negulesco
- Written by: Peggy Goodin (novel); Julius J. Epstein; Philip G. Epstein
- Produced by: Julian Blaustein
- Starring: Jeanne Crain; Dale Robertson; Mitzi Gaynor; Jean Peters
- Cinematography: Harry Jackson
- Edited by: William H. Reynolds
- Music by: Alfred Newman
- Distributed by: Twentieth Century-Fox
- Release dates: July 6, 1951 (Los Angeles); July 18, 1951 (New York)
- Running time: 93 minutes
- Country: United States
- Language: English
- Box office: $1,850,000 (U.S. rentals)

Take Care of My Little Girl is a 1951 American Technicolor drama film directed by Jean Negulesco and starring Jeanne Crain, Dale Robertson, Mitzi Gaynor and Jean Peters.

The screenplay is based on the 1950 novel of the same name written by Peggy Goodin.

== Plot ==
Liz Erickson is a young, naive woman who has recently graduated from high school. Along with best friend Janet Shaw, she leaves her parental home to attend Midwestern University, where her mother was once a legendary student. Liz and Janet dream of pledging with the elite Tri-U sorority. Liz thinks that joining a sorority is more important than her education and is surprised that her roommate Adelaide Swanson is not interested in Tri-U.

During her first weeks of college, Liz befriends Tri-U's members, including Dallas Prewitt, Marge Colby, Merry Coombs and Casey Krausse. However, Janet does not make a favorable impression on the snobbish girls. Ruth Gates, a shy girl whose mother was a respected Tri-U, is admitted as a legacy pledge. When Liz is admitted, she feels guilty for realizing her dream while Janet, crushed by the rejection, is leaving the college.

Liz meets Joe Blake, a college senior and former soldier who is opposed to sororities and their snobbish cliques. Liz is pushed by arrogant Dallas to date Chad Carnes, the most popular fraternity boy and a drunken womanizer. Chad wins her affection but convinces her to help him cheat on an important exam. Her sorority sisters acclaim her as a hero, but Joe disapproves of her lack of ethics.

"Hell Week" begins, which includes humiliating and playing pranks on the new pledges. Dallas insists on releasing Ruth from the sorority while Liz is assigned to run silly errands. She meets Joe and agrees to accompany him to a party. Chad chastises Liz for attending the party and ignoring her duties. Joe defends her and the men fight. Realizing that Joe is the man whom she prefers, she rejects Chad, removes her pledge pin and returns to Tri-U.

Liz is disgusted to learn that Ruth has been removed from the sorority and finds her wandering the streets. Liz takes her to a hospital, where Ruth is diagnosed with pneumonia. Ashamed for being a member of a clique that has done this to Ruth, Liz goes to Tri-U to return her pin and castigates the girls for their hypocrisy and snobbishness. She leaves with Joe, wondering how her mother will react.

== Cast ==
- Jeanne Crain as Elizabeth "Liz" Erickson
- Dale Robertson as Joe Blake
- Mitzi Gaynor as Adelaide Swanson
- Jean Peters as Dallas Prewitt
- Jeffrey Hunter as Chad Carnes
- Betty Lynn as Marge Colby
- Helen Westcott as Merry Coombs
- Lenka Peterson as Ruth Gates
- Carol Brannon as Casey Krausse
- Natalie Schafer as Mother Cookie Clark
- Beverly Dennis as Janet Shaw
- Kathleen Hughes as Jenny Barker
- Peggy O'Connor as June
- Marjorie Crossland as Olive Erickson
- John Litel as John Erickson

== Production ==
In February 1950, it was announced that Anatole Litvak was set to direct and produce the film, but Jean Negulesco was later assigned as the director. Darryl F. Zanuck was enthusiastic about the film and allowed the budget to be increased so that Negulesco could film additional scenes. Jean Peters was cast in October 1950 and Susan Hayward was considered for the role of Liz.

By late 1950, the film had become the subject of much controversy. Many American sororities protested against Take Care of My Little Girl and For Men Only, another film critical of fraternities and sororities, and pressured Twentieth Century-Fox to suppress its release. One reviewer noted that "even before the film was made, het-up sorority sisters blasted it like fruit growers protesting The Grapes of Wrath." Most of the complaints were later dropped because they had generated publicity for the films.

== Reception ==
In a contemporary review for The New York Times, critic Bosley Crowther called Take Care of My Little Girl "a brightly entertaining and frankly provocative film".

Critic Philip K. Scheuer of the Los Angeles Times wrote: "As an indictment, 'Take Care of My Little Girl' is watered down well below the explosive point, but it does afford some insight into the workings of these ultra-exclusive clubs of girls and is fitfully entertaining as both drama and comedy. It might have been 'socko' as one or the other."

== Adaptation ==
Take Care of My Little Girl was presented on Lux Radio Theatre on February 4, 1952. The one-hour adaptation starred Crain and Robertson in their film roles.
