= Broken Lance =

1954 film by Edward Dmytryk

- Theatrical release poster
- Directed by: Edward Dmytryk
- Screenplay by: Richard Murphy
- Story by: Philip Yordan
- Based on: I'll Never Go There Any More (1941 novel) by Jerome Weidman
- Produced by: Sol C. Siegel
- Starring: Spencer Tracy; Robert Wagner; Jean Peters; Richard Widmark; Katy Jurado
- Cinematography: Joseph MacDonald
- Edited by: Dorothy Spencer
- Music by: Leigh Harline
- Color process: Technicolor
- Production company: 20th Century Fox
- Distributed by: 20th Century Fox
- Release dates: July 29, 1954 (New York City); September 25, 1954 (United States)
- Running time: 96 minutes
- Country: United States
- Language: English
- Budget: $1,685,000
- Box office: $3.8 million (US rentals)

Broken Lance is a 1954 American Western film directed by Edward Dmytryk and produced by Sol C. Siegel. The film stars Spencer Tracy, Robert Wagner, Jean Peters, Richard Widmark and Katy Jurado.

Shot in Technicolor and CinemaScope, the film is a remake of House of Strangers, with the Philip Yordan screenplay (based on the novel, I'll Never Go There Any More, by Jerome Weidman) transplanted out West, featuring Tracy in the original Edward G. Robinson role, this time as a cowboy cattle baron rather than an Italian banker in New York City. It has been widely noted that the story bears a strong resemblance to King Lear.

== Plot ==
Matthew Devereaux is a ranch owner who has built an enormous ranch and mining empire. He raised his sons to carry on his fierce, hard-working Irish settlement spirit that helped make him a success. However, as a consequence, he has never shown fatherly affection to his three older sons by his late first wife: Ben, Mike and Denny. He treats these grown men (in their 30s and 40s) not much better than hired help. Although they manage the day-to-day operations of the ranch and other enterprises full time, Matt still retains complete authority, right down to the smallest decisions, angering his eldest son. This resentment leads the three eldest sons to unite against their father.

Joe is Matt's biracial son by his second wife, a Native American who pretended to be Mexican. The townspeople call her "Señora" out of respect for Matt, but not out of respect for her. Matt's power and prestige keeps the discrimination by the townspeople towards Joe to a minimum, so long as Joe, an emerging young adult, is principally interested in riding the range alone, and spending time at his mother's native American reservation and with her people.

Joe, who shows no interest in owning or running the ranch empire, loves his father and would do anything for him. Because of Matt's wife's insistence that he change his attitude towards their son, he comes to appreciate him and regularly converse with his youngest son. The three older brothers interpret Matt's relationship with Joe and his treatment of them as if he has only one son instead of four as a rejection by their father. Their resentment deepens.

Matt, Ben, Joe and two Indian workers catch the two middle sons and four accomplices rustling Matt's cattle, resulting in two of the four accomplices being killed. Joe pleads for leniency toward his errant brothers, but an outraged Matt banishes them, later reluctantly taking them back into the family when a crisis arises.

There is a copper mine on Matt's land, and he had leased out the mineral rights. After 40 head of cattle die, Matt determines the mine is polluting a stream where he waters his cattle. He becomes furious and leads a raid on the mine offices and director. The court issues a warrant to arrest whoever was responsible for the attack. To spare his father the agony and humiliation of a stay behind bars, Joe claims responsibility and is sentenced to three years in prison.

Ben and his other brothers rebel against their father during Joe's absence with such fierceness that the old man suffers a fatal stroke. Joe is permitted to leave prison long enough to attend his father's funeral, during which he formally severs his ties with his brothers and proclaims a blood feud.

Having served his prison sentence, Joe returns to the ranch. The señora, his mother, who went to live with her people after Matt's death, persuades him to forget revenge and leave the country. Joe takes her advice, but Ben, fearing Joe's revenge for indirectly causing their father's death, ambushes and tries to kill Joe. The two half-brothers fight until Two Moons, the ranch foreman, saves Joe's life by shooting Ben dead before he can shoot an unarmed Joe. Time passes, and Joe and his new wife, Barbara, visit Matt's grave. There, Joe sees the down-turned lance, the Indian symbol for a blood feud, and breaks it in half, thus ending the feud.

== Cast ==
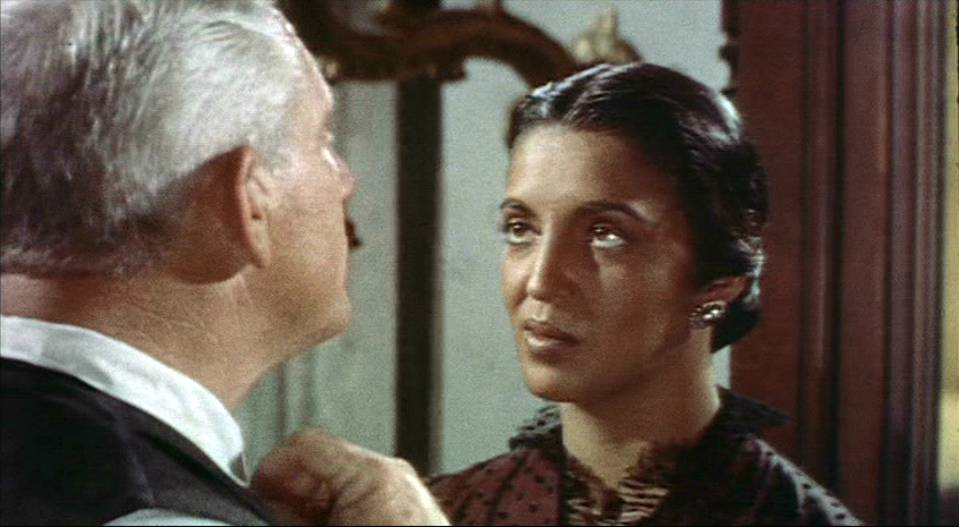
Spencer Tracy and Katy Jurado

- Spencer Tracy as Matt Devereaux
- Robert Wagner as Joe Devereaux
- Jean Peters as Barbara
- Richard Widmark as Ben Devereaux
- Katy Jurado as Señora Devereaux
- Hugh O'Brian as Mike Devereaux
- Eduard Franz as Two Moons
- Earl Holliman as Denny Devereaux
- E. G. Marshall as Horace, the governor
- Carl Benton Reid as Clem Lawton
- Philip Ober as Van Cleve
- Robert Burton as Mac Andrews

== Accolades ==
The film won the Oscar for Best Story for Philip Yordan. Katy Jurado was nominated for Best Supporting Actress. Jurado's role was originally for Dolores del Río. The film also won a Golden Globe Award as Best Film Promoting International Understanding. The New York Times reviewer A.H. Weiler wrote, "Although the saga of the self-made, autocratic cattle baron… is familiar film fare, Broken Lance… makes a refreshingly serious and fairly successful attempt to understand these towering men...[T]he rugged, vast and beautiful terrain of the Southwest is impressive and pleasing in the colors and CinemaScope in which it was filmed."

== Home media ==
The film was released on DVD May 24, 2005. Viewers have the option of watching either a "pan and scan" full-screen version or the original widescreen version. Both versions have stereophonic sound, and have been digitally restored. The film was newly remastered for Blu-ray by Twilight Time in the correct CinemaScope aspect ratio of 2.55:1.

== See also ==
- List of American films of 1954
