= Stan Hough =

American film director

- Born: Stanley L. Hough; July 23, 1918; Los Angeles, California, U.S.
- Died: February 23, 1990 (aged 71); Los Angeles, California, U.S.
- Occupations: Producer, studio executive
- Spouse: Jean Peters (m. 1971)

Stanley L. Hough (July 23, 1918 – February 23, 1990) was an American film executive and film and television producer.

He worked as an assistant director from 1952 to 1961. He then became vice-president in charge of production operations at 20th Century Fox.

In 1971 he married the actress Jean Peters after she had divorced her estranged husband Howard Hughes. Hough then decided to become a producer and resigned his post at 20th Century Fox. His first job was on the successful movie Emperor of the North Pole starring Lee Marvin, Ernest Borgnine, and Keith Carradine. He then produced the Planet of the Apes TV series which only lasted for 13 episodes on CBS in September 1974. He wrote the stories for the successful westerns Bandolero! (1968) and The Undefeated (1969).
