= Anne of the Indies =

1951 film by Jacques Tourneur

- Original film poster
- Directed by: Jacques Tourneur
- Written by: Arthur Caesar; Philip Dunne
- Based on: Anne of the Indies; 1947 story by Herbert Sass
- Produced by: George Jessel
- Starring: Jean Peters; Louis Jourdan; Debra Paget; Herbert Marshall; Thomas Gomez
- Cinematography: Harry Jackson
- Edited by: Robert Fritch
- Music by: Franz Waxman
- Distributed by: 20th Century Fox
- Release date: October 18, 1951 (US)
- Running time: 81 min
- Country: United States
- Language: English
- Box office: $1,550,000 (US rentals)

Anne of the Indies is a 1951 Technicolor swashbuckler adventure film released by Twentieth Century-Fox and starring stars Jean Peters, Louis Jourdan and Debra Paget. It was directed by Jacques Tourneur and produced by George Jessel.

== Plot ==
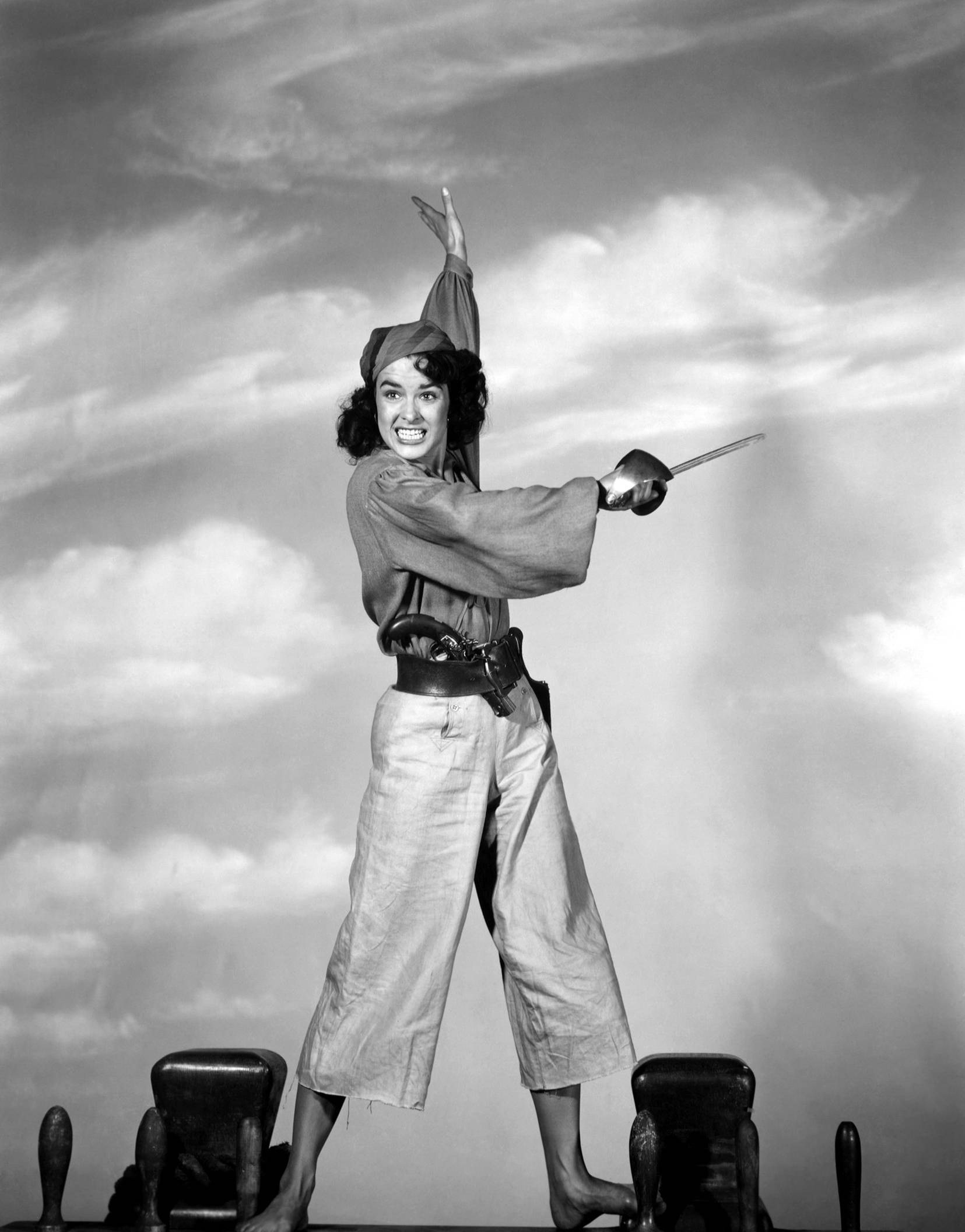
Jean Peters in Anne of the Indies

After seizing a British ship, pirate captain Anne Providence spares LaRochelle, a Frenchman captured by the British, from walking the plank. LaRochelle agrees to join Providence's crew and she soon begins to fall in love with him.

They travel to an island where they meet with her pirate mentor Captain Blackbeard, who dislikes LaRochelle. Blackbeard realizes that he had seen LaRochelle in the French navy when a pirate was hanged. LaRochelle claims he was dismissed from the navy. Anne believes LaRochelle, but when Blackbeard attacks him, she defends him and sends Blackbeard and his men away.

LaRochelle is working for the British as they have captured his ship, and he has a wife. He betrays Anne to the British, who attack her ship. She escapes and takes his wife as a hostage. The British do not return LaRochelle's ship to him, having failed to capture Anne as planned, so he acquires a ship to pursue Anne. In the confrontation that follows, LaRochelle's ship is destroyed and he is captured.

Anne maroons LaRochelle and his wife on a remote island to die. She sails away, but a few days later, her conscience compels her to return with provisions and a small boat. As she does so, she is attacked by Blackbeard, and instead of fleeing, she remains and fights to stop Blackbeard from finding LaRochelle, although her ship is no match. As Anne, the last survivor of her crew, challenges Blackbeard to a final duel, she is killed by a final, deadly salvo from the enemy ship before Blackbeard can stop his cannoneers. Watching the disaster unfold, LaRochelle and his wife pay tribute to Anne's sacrifice.

== Cast ==
- Jean Peters as Anne, also known as Capt. Providence
- Louis Jourdan as Capt. Pierre François LaRochelle
- Debra Paget as Molly LaRochelle
- Herbert Marshall as Dr. Jameson
- Thomas Gomez as Blackbeard
- James Robertson Justice as Red Dougal
- Francis Pierlot as Herkimer
- Sean McClory as Hackett
- Holmes Herbert as British sea captain
- Byron Nelson as Bear handler
- Mario Siletti as Auctioneer
- James Dime as pirate
- Dimples Cooper (Elizabeth Cooper) as Slave girl (uncredited)

== Production ==
The film is based on a short story published in The Saturday Evening Post in 1947 by historical-fiction author Herbert Sass, who received requests from publishers and studios to write a film treatment of the story. In 1948, he offered a fictionalized version of the true story of Anne Bonny, including a 10-page "factual basis" for the story. However, the final film bears little resemblance to Sass's story.

In February 1948, Walter Wanger bought the screen rights to the story as a vehicle for Susan Hayward, whom Wanger had under contract, reportedly at Hayward's request. Wanger hired Jan Fortune to write a script and announced that the film, also known as Queen of the Pirates, would be produced later that year for Eagle Lion. The film was the second of a four-film deal between Wanger and Eagle Lion following Tulsa (1949).

In August 1948, Wanger announced his decision to shelve the film, as he believed that its estimated budget of $1.5 million was excessive.

In February 1949, it was that reported Hayward would appear in the film at Columbia, where Guy Endore was writing a script and Mark Robson was to direct. By July, Hayward was reportedly trying to start the project at Twentieth Century-Fox, to whom she owed a film. In May 1950, Fox bought the story and assigned Arthur Caesar to write the script and George Jessel to produce the film, with Hayward still attached as its star. However, Hayward was ultimately unable to star in the film.

By November 1950, Louis Jourdan, whose contract with David O. Selznick had recently been bought by Fox, was signed to play the male lead and Valentina Cortesa was slated to play a female pirate. Jourdan and Debra Paget had recently appeared together in Bird of Paradise (1951) for Fox. By January 1951, Cortesa was removed from the project, reportedly because of her accent, and Constance Smith was being tested. However, the title role was eventually awarded to Jean Peters, her first starring role. Darryl F. Zanuck later said that the studio had developed Peters for seven years and felt that she "comes through big" in the film.

Filming began on February 26, 1951.

Jacques Tourneur was signed to a long-term contract at Fox after filming completed.

== Reception ==
In a contemporary review for The New York Times, critic Bosley Crowther called the film "eyewash of the most completely florid and synthetic sort" and wrote:

Piracy more bold and predatory than that in this picture occurs at costume balls. ... Indeed, everyone in this picture, outside of Mr. Gomez in that filthy black beard, look like good, normal middle-class people milling around in one of those night clubs they call the Robber's Den. And the things they do ... are no more dashing in execution than the usual social traffic in such a place. Perhaps it was even impossible for the actors themselves to enthuse over a lady pirate with the face of a photographer's model and the swashbuckling airs of a lass in Miss Twitt's Finishing School.
