= Love That Brute =

1950 film by Alexander Hall

- Theatrical poster
- Directed by: Alexander Hall
- Written by: Karl Tunberg; Darrell Ware; John Lee Mahin
- Produced by: Fred Kohlmar
- Starring: Paul Douglas; Jean Peters
- Cinematography: Lloyd Ahern
- Edited by: Nick DeMaggio
- Music by: Cyril J. Mockridge
- Color process: Black and white
- Production company: 20th Century Fox
- Distributed by: 20th Century Fox
- Release dates: May 26, 1950 (New York); June 9, 1950 (Los Angeles)
- Running time: 85 minutes
- Country: United States
- Language: English

Love That Brute is a 1950 American comedy crime film directed by Alexander Hall and starring Paul Douglas and Jean Peters. The film is a remake of Tall, Dark and Handsome, a 1941 film also distributed by Twentieth Century-Fox.

== Plot ==
In 1928 Chicago, two gangsters kill a store owner. Mobster Big Ed sends top henchman Bugsy Welch to place his trademark white carnation on the corpses to suggest that he is responsible for the murders. The police rush to arrest Big Ed, but he has an alibi: he has been in the park, where he encounters Ruth Manning, a country girl who came to Chicago to be a singer but is now a children's governess.

Big Ed falls in love with Ruth and poses as a widowed father, asking her to care for his child, with the promise of tripling her salary. When she accepts, Big Ed sends Bugsy to audition a boy to pose as his son, and Bugsy finds Harry the Kid Jr., the foul-mouthed son of a gangster. Ruth grows close to Big Ed but is offended when he gives her an expensive fur coat on Christmas Eve, thinking that he wants to buy her affection. She packs her bags to leave, but Big Ed convinces her to stay until they can find Harry a school.

The next day, the mansion is surrounded by men working for Big Ed's archrival Pretty Willie Wetzchahofsky. Ruth wants to warn the police, but Mamie Sage, Big Ed's friend who is posing as a maid, dissuades her before revealing Big Ed's identity. Ruth is appalled but decides to stay until Harry is enrolled at a military academy. Meanwhile, Big Ed has reached a truce with Pretty Willie, and they agree to not interfere with each other's mob activities.

Months later, Ruth is a singer in Big Ed's former nightclub. Big Ed attends her opening night and wants to reconcile, but Pretty Willie, who is also interested in Ruth, convinces her that Big Ed is a ruthless killer. She learns that Harry has been missing from military school. After finding him, she learns through Bugsy that Big Ed has never hurt anyone in his life, and that all of his alleged victims, including Mamie's husband, are living in his basement.

Big Ed's prisoners escape and arrive at a party. Pretty Willie, disappointed that Big Ed is not as tough as Pretty Willie had believed him to be, orders his henchmen to kill Big Ed. However, Pretty Willie's men appreciate Big Ed's kindness and help him to escape while faking his death. Bugsy identifies a body as that of Big Ed, and during the funeral, Big Ed appears and surprises Ruth. She admits that she had been crushed when she thought that he had died, and they kiss. Pretty Willie arrested and Big Ed joins Ruth on a ship, where they will be married, along with Harry and Bugsy.

== Cast ==
- Paul Douglas as E.L. "Big Ed" Hanley
- Jean Peters as Ruth Manning
- Cesar Romero as Pretty Willie Wetzchahofsky
- Keenan Wynn as Bugsy Welch
- Joan Davis as Mamie Sage
- Arthur Treacher as Quentin, Big Ed's butler
- Peter Price as Harry the Kid Jr.
- Jay C. Flippen as Biff Sage
- Barry Kelley as Detective Charlie
- Leon Belasco as François Ducray, a.k.a. Frenchy

== Production ==
Cesar Romero, who plays Pretty Willie, also starred in the original film, Tall, Dark and Handsome, in which he portrayed the kind gangster. Studio chief Darryl F. Zanuck initially suggested actor Richard Basehart for the villain role before Romero was offered the part. The lead role was assigned to Paul Douglas in April 1949, with Jean Peters cast in June 1949. To prepare for the singing and dancing scene, Peters took several lessons with Betty Grable's dance instructor.

Shooting took place in the summer of 1949 under the working title Turned Up Toes.

This was Arthur Treacher's penultimate film appearance; in 1964, he played Constable Jones in Mary Poppins.

== Reception ==
In a contemporary review for The New York Times, critic Thomas M. Pryor wrote: "'Love That Brute,' while not a world beater by any means, is bright and breezy entertainment through most of its eighty-odd minutes' running time. Smart acting and crisp dialogue do wonders for a story which might easily have been felled by the weight of its improbabilities."

Critic John L. Scott of the Los Angeles Times wrote: "Remakes are invariably not as good as the original, but this case may be rated an exception. if memory serves. ... There are some amusing touches scattered throughout the picture, with Keenan Wynn as Douglas' chief aide responsible for much of the humor. The boy adds his share, if you can stand the precocious type he portrays. Joan Davis, the always-funny comedienne, enlivens the show, too. Assorted gangster types act tough and bring laughs at the same time. Douglas plays his role fairly straight, and it's a good job."

== Adaptation ==
A radio adaptation was broadcast on the Lux Radio Theatre on October 9, 1950, with Douglas and Peters reprising their roles.
