= In the Meantime, Darling =

1944 film by Otto Preminger

- Original poster
- Directed by: Otto Preminger
- Written by: Arthur Kober; Michael Uris
- Produced by: Otto Preminger
- Starring: Jeanne Crain; Frank Latimore; Mary Nash
- Cinematography: Joseph MacDonald
- Edited by: Louis R. Loeffler
- Music by: Cyril J. Mockridge
- Distributed by: 20th Century Fox
- Release date: September 22, 1944
- Running time: 72 minutes
- Country: United States
- Language: English

In the Meantime, Darling is a 1944 American drama film produced and directed by Otto Preminger. The screenplay by Arthur Kober and Michael Uris focuses on a wealthy war bride (Jeanne Crain) who is forced to adjust to living in spartan conditions in military housing during World War II.

== Plot ==
Due to limited wartime housing, Army lieutenant Danny Ferguson (Frank Latimore) and fiancée Maggie Preston (Jeanne Crain) must postpone their wedding until a room in the Craig Hotel, where married officers stationed at nearby Camp Fielding live with their wives, becomes available. When their accommodations are ready, Maggie arrives with her wealthy parents Henry and Vera (Eugene Pallette and Mary Nash), who are unhappy about the living conditions their daughter will be forced to endure. Initially Maggie is too happy to care, but once the newlywed is left alone during the day while her husband is on the base, she begins to become disenchanted with her surroundings and the lack of service her privileged background has groomed her to expect.

Unaware of what is expected of her in her new capacity of army wife, Maggie quickly becomes an outcast among the other women. Not helping her situation is an obvious lack of any domestic skills that would allow her to assist in the daily routine at the hotel. Increasingly upset with her situation, she lashes out at hotel manager Mrs. Jerry Armstrong (Jane Randolph). Her mood softens when she learns Jerry's husband was killed in battle overseas and she has remained at the hotel to honor his memory.

Maggie's attitude changes and she befriends some of the other wives, particularly Shirley (Gale Robbins), who is married to Danny's best friend Lt. Red Pianatowski (Stanley Prager). When Danny finds himself the target of snide remarks made by his fellow officers, he discovers Maggie asked her father to use his influence to keep his son-in-law based in the States instead of being shipped overseas. Infuriated by her interference, he angrily storms out of their room, and Maggie prepares to return to her parents in Philadelphia.

When Danny returns with Philip, they discover a book about infant care Maggie had purchased to help her assist the expectant mothers, and he assumes she is pregnant. Rushing to the train station, he begs her to return. That night, at a dance honoring a visiting general, Red tells Shirley that Maggie is expecting a baby. As Maggie tries to tell her husband the truth, he receives word his company is being sent overseas. Danny is disappointed to learn he is not going to be a father after all, but Maggie reassures him she will be anxious to start a family as soon as he returns. After Danny and Red ship out, Maggie and Shirley decide to find jobs in the defense industry and do what they can to support their husbands and the rest of the troops.

== Cast ==
- Jeanne Crain as Maggie Preston
- Frank Latimore as Lt. Daniel Ferguson
- Stanley Prager as Lt. Red Pianatowski
- Gale Robbins as Shirley Pianatowski
- Eugene Pallette as Henry B. Preston
- Mary Nash as Vera Preston
- Cara Williams as Ruby Mae Sayre
- Doris Merrick as Mrs. MacAndrews
- Reed Hadley as Maj. Phillips
- Heather Angel as Mrs. Nelson
- Elisabeth Risdon as Mrs. Helen Corkery
- Blake Edwards as Lt. Eley (uncredited)
- Ruth Clifford as Miss Phillips (uncredited)
- Glenn Langan as Lt. Larkin (uncredited)
- Clarence Muse as Henry (uncredited)

== Production ==
“The purpose of In the Meantime, Darling (other than dubious entertainment) is to show Americans the need to pull together across class lines…Hollywood endorsed this message, and was adept at turning it into plots by using marriage as the metaphor.”—Film historian Jeanine Basinger in I Do and I Don’t: A History of Marriage in the Movies (2012)

The initial draft of the screenplay, entitled Paris, Tennessee, was completed in July 1943, and 20th Century Fox executive Darryl F. Zanuck assigned the project to Archie Mayo. The script underwent numerous revisions and was retitled Army Wife before going into production as I Married a Soldier in December. By then Zanuck agreed to allow Preminger to direct as well as produce the film. It marked the screen debut of Frank Latimore and Gale Robbins and the first time Jeanne Crain would receive top billing. The cast also included future director Blake Edwards in a small, uncredited supporting role.

The screenplay continued to undergo extensive changes as filming progressed, and on February 4, 1944, the Los Angeles Examiner reported the project was in trouble. Joseph Breen, who headed the Production Code Administration, was certain the British Board of Film Censors would object to a scene showing the newlywed couple in bed and recommended Preminger restage it, although the shot remained in both the US and UK releases. It was the first film to show a married couple in bed since the Motion Picture Production Code was established in 1934, a fact that greatly pleased Preminger.

According to Preminger, he realized during filming that Eugene Pallette, cast as Maggie's father, was "an admirer of Hitler [and] was convinced that Germany would win the war." Preminger stated that he also discovered the actor was a racist when he refused to sit next to African American cast member Clarence Muse and used a racial slur to refer to him. Preminger writes that he immediately fired Pallette and, although he remains in scenes he already had filmed, the remainder of his role not yet shot was eliminated from the script. It supports Preminger's claim that Pallette was subsequently used only in smaller film productions until his retirement from the film industry in 1946.

After principal photography was completed, the screenplay underwent more revisions in order to enhance the screen presence of Jeanne Crain. After these additional scenes were filmed in late March 1944, the film's title was changed yet again to In the Meantime, Darling.

The song "How Many Times Do I Have to Tell You," performed by Gale Robbins during the dance sequence, was written by Jimmy McHugh and Harold Adamson.

== See also ==
- List of American films of 1944

== Sources ==
- Basinger, Jeanine. 2012. I Do and I Don’t: A History of Marriage in the Movies. Alfred A. Knopf, New York. ISBN 978-0804169745
