= It Happens Every Spring =

1949 science fiction sports comedy film by Lloyd Bacon

- Directed by: Lloyd Bacon
- Screenplay by: Valentine Davies
- Story by: Shirley W. Smith; Valentine Davies
- Produced by: William Perlberg
- Starring: Ray Milland; Jean Peters; Paul Douglas
- Cinematography: Joseph MacDonald
- Edited by: Bruce B. Pierce
- Music by: Leigh Harline
- Color process: Black and white
- Production company: 20th Century Fox
- Distributed by: 20th Century Fox
- Release date: May 26, 1949 (St. Louis)
- Running time: 87 minutes
- Country: United States
- Language: English
- Box office: $1,850,000

It Happens Every Spring is a 1949 American science-fiction sports comedy film directed by Lloyd Bacon and starring Ray Milland, Jean Peters, and Paul Douglas.

== Plot ==
A college professor is working on a long-term scientific experiment when a baseball comes through the window, destroying all of his glassware and spilling the fluids that the flasks and test tubes contained. The pooled fluids combine to form the chemical "methylethylpropylbutyl", which then covers a large portion of the baseball. The professor soon discovers that the fluid, along with any object with which it makes contact, is repelled by wood (cf. Alexander Fleming's serendipitous discovery of penicillin).

Suddenly, he realizes the possibilities and takes a leave of absence to go to St. Louis to pitch in the big leagues, where he becomes a star and propels his team to the World Series.

== Cast ==
- Ray Milland as Prof. Vernon K. Simpson / King Kelly (not based on the 19th-century ball player Mike "King" Kelly)
- Jean Peters as Deborah Greenleaf
- Paul Douglas as Monk Lanigan
- Ed Begley as Edgar Stone
- Ted de Corsia as Jimmy Dolan
- Ray Collins as Prof. Alfred Greenleaf
- Jessie Royce Landis as Mrs. Greenleaf
- Alan Hale Jr. as Schmidt
- William Murphy as Tommy Isbell (as Bill Murphy)

== Production ==
Although the home team is "St. Louis", and both St. Louis major league teams (the Cardinals and the Browns) played at Sportsman's Park at the time, most of the baseball action scenes were filmed in Los Angeles' Wrigley Field. They were supplemented by stock footage of Chicago's Wrigley Field and New York's Yankee Stadium.

Alan Hale, Jr., has a small role as a catcher on the college baseball team.

A novelization of the film was written by Valentine Davies.

== Release ==
The film had its premiere in St. Louis on May 26, 1949, before opening the following day in Pittsburgh and then in 30 theaters after the Memorial Day weekend.

== Reception ==
New York Times critic Bosley Crowther found the film trying, particularly Valentine Davies's "monotonous" script. He did have measured praise for Paul Douglas, however.

Leonard Maltin gives the film three and a half stars, calling it "a most enjoyable, unpretentious picture".

== See also ==
- List of American films of 1949
- List of baseball films
