= O. Henry's Full House =

1952 film

- Theatrical film poster
- Directed by: Henry Koster; Henry Hathaway; Jean Negulesco; Howard Hawks; Henry King
- Screenplay by: Richard L. Breen; Walter Bullock; Philip Dunne; Ivan Goff; Ben Hecht; Nunnally Johnson; Charles Lederer; Ben Roberts; Lamar Trotti
- Based on: Short stories by O. Henry
- Produced by: André Hakim
- Starring: Fred Allen; Anne Baxter; Jeanne Crain; Farley Granger; Charles Laughton; Oscar Levant; Marilyn Monroe; Jean Peters; Gregory Ratoff; Dale Robertson; David Wayne; Richard Widmark
- Narrated by: John Steinbeck
- Cinematography: Lloyd Ahern; Lucien Ballard; Milton R. Krasner; Joseph MacDonald
- Edited by: Nick DeMaggio; Barbara McLean; William B. Murphy
- Music by: Alfred Newman
- Distributed by: 20th Century Fox
- Release date: October 16, 1952
- Running time: 117 minutes
- Country: United States
- Language: English
- Box office: $1 million (US rentals)

O. Henry's Full House is a 1952 American anthology film made by 20th Century Fox, consisting of five films, each based on a story by O. Henry.

The film was produced by André Hakim and directed by five directors from five screenplays with different authors. The music score was composed by Alfred Newman. The film is narrated by author John Steinbeck, who made his only on-camera appearance to introduce each story.

== Plot ==
=== Prologue ===
A prologue presented by narrator John Steinbeck introduces biographic background on O. Henry and mentions several of his other stories not included, notably the story of reformed safecracker Jimmy Valentine in A Retrieved Reformation.

=== "The Cop and the Anthem" ===
Directed by Henry Koster, from a screenplay by Lamar Trotti, it stars Charles Laughton, Marilyn Monroe and David Wayne. As winter approaches, a vagrant decides it's time for his annual winter spell in prison. But no matter how hard he tries, he cannot get himself arrested.

=== "The Clarion Call" ===
Directed by Henry Hathaway, from a screenplay by Richard Breen, it stars Dale Robertson and Richard Widmark. A detective feels he cannot arrest a murderer he knows from his past due to his honor involving an outstanding financial debt to the criminal. Once a newspaper offers a reward, after being mocked by the criminal, the detective arrests the criminal and collects the reward to repay the debt.

This vignette reunited Henry Hathaway and Richard Widmark who'd worked together on the noir classic Kiss of Death (1947). Widmark's character in The Clarion Call, "Johnny Kernan", is actually a reprise of his Oscar-nominated character "Tommy Udo" from Kiss of Death. Widmark's Udo/Kernan character was inspired by his love of Batman comics' "The Joker". The Tommy Udo performance in turn influenced Frank Gorshin in preparation for his "Riddler" character on the Batman TV series in the 1960s.

=== "The Last Leaf" ===
Directed by Jean Negulescu, from a screenplay by Ivan Goff and Ben Roberts, it stars Anne Baxter, Jean Peters, and Gregory Ratoff. The story is set in Greenwich Village during the depths of winter. A poor old painter saves the life of a young woman, dying of pneumonia, by giving her the will to live. From her bed the patient can see an ivy vine through the window gradually losing its leaves in the intense cold. She has taken it into her head that she will die when the vine loses its last leaf. Seemingly, the last leaf never falls, and the young woman survives. In reality, the vine lost all its leaves during the cold night. The leaf she thought she had seen was just the image of a leaf painted on the wall with perfect realism, by the old artist, who died of exposure in the cold shortly after finishing the painted leaf.

=== "The Ransom of Red Chief" ===
Directed by Howard Hawks, from a screenplay by Nunnally Johnson, rewritten by Ben Hecht and Charles Lederer (none of whom were credited), it stars Fred Allen, Oscar Levant, Lee Aaker, Irving Bacon, and Kathleen Freeman. Two con men kidnap a child in order to collect a substantial ransom, but the child proves to be too much for them.

Nunnally Johnson wrote the original screenplay for Clifton Webb as "Slick" and William Demarest as "William", but when Fred Allen and Oscar Levant were cast, Hawks asked Hecht and Lederer to do a rewrite. Johnson was unhappy with the result and asked to have his name removed from the film.

=== "The Gift of the Magi" ===
Directed by Henry King, from a screenplay by Walter Bullock and Philip Dunne (who was uncredited), it stars Jeanne Crain and Farley Granger. On Christmas Eve, with little money, Della sells her hair to buy her husband Jim a watch fob. Jim has sold his watch to buy her a pair of ornamental combs. When they exchange these now useless gifts, they realize how deep their love is for one another.

== Cast ==
The Cop and the Anthem

- Charles Laughton as Soapy
- Marilyn Monroe as Streetwalker
- David Wayne as Horace

The Clarion Call

- Dale Robertson as Barney Woods
- Richard Widmark as Johnny Kernan
- Richard Rober as Chief of Detectives
- House Peters as Dave Bascom

The Last Leaf

- Anne Baxter as Joanna Goodwin
- Jean Peters as Susan Goodwin
- Gregory Ratoff as Behrman
- Richard Garrick as Doctor

The Ransom of Red Chief

- Fred Allen as Samuel Brown
- Oscar Levant as William Smith
- Lee Aaker as J.B. Dorset
- Irving Bacon as Ebenezer Dorset
- Kathleen Freeman as Mrs. Dorset

The Gift of the Magi

- Jeanne Crain as Della Young
- Farley Granger as Jim Young
- Fred Kelsey as Mr. Schultz / Santa Claus

== "The Ransom of Red Chief" ==
When the film was first premiered in September 1952 in Los Angeles, it consisted of five parts, including Howard Hawks' "The Ransom of Red Chief".

The Hawks short was so poorly received that the studio removed it before the film opened in New York that October, leading some outlets to describe the film as O'Henry's Four of a Kind.

Eventually, "The Ransom of Red Chief" was reinstated, and is included on the DVD release.

== See also ==
- List of Christmas films
