= Paul Douglas (actor) =

American actor (1907–1959)

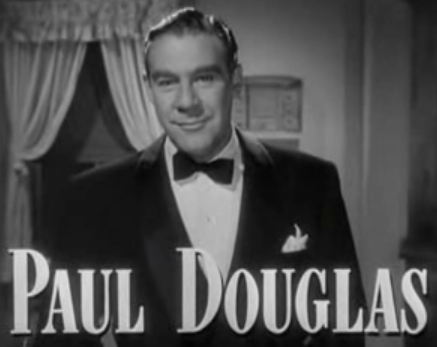
- Douglas in A Letter to Three Wives (1949)
- Born: Paul Douglas Fleischer; April 11, 1907; Philadelphia, Pennsylvania, U.S.
- Died: September 11, 1959 (aged 52); Hollywood, California, U.S.
- Occupation: Actor
- Years active: 1936−1959
- Spouse(s): Elizabeth Farnum (m. 19??; div. 19??); Susie Wells (m. 19??; div. 19??) Gerri Higgins (m. 1940; div. 1941) Virginia Field (m. 1942; div. 1946) Jan Sterling (m. 1950)
- Children: 4

Paul Douglas Fleischer (April 11, 1907 − September 11, 1959), known professionally as Paul Douglas, was an American actor.

== Early years ==
Douglas was born in Philadelphia, Pennsylvania, the son of Margaret (Douglas) and William Paul Fleischer. He attended Yale College and participated in dramatics as a student there.

== Career ==
Before becoming an actor, Douglas spent 20 years in the 20th Century-Fox newsreel department as a narrator and writer of captions. He had also been a narrator for several Vitaphone short films.

Douglas made his Broadway debut in 1936 as the radio announcer in Doty Hobart and Tom McKnight's Double Dummy at the John Golden Theatre. In 1946, he won both a Theatre World Award and a Clarence Derwent Award for his portrayal of Harry Brock in Garson Kanin's Born Yesterday.

In the 1930s, Ruth McGinnis helped create the movie Behind the Eight-Ball with Douglas.

Douglas may be best remembered for two baseball comedy movies, It Happens Every Spring (1949) and Angels in the Outfield (1951). He also played Richard Widmark's police partner in the 1950 thriller Panic in the Streets, frustrated newlywed Porter Hollingsway in A Letter to Three Wives (1949), Sgt. Kowalski in The Big Lift (1950), a con man-turned-monk in When in Rome (1952), businessman Calvin B. Marshall in The Maggie (1954) and businessman Josiah Walter Dudley in Executive Suite (1954). He starred in Clash by Night in 1952 with Barbara Stanwyck.

Douglas was the host of the 22nd annual Academy Awards in March 1950. Continuing in radio, he was the announcer for The Ed Wynn Show and the first host of NBC Radio's The Horn & Hardart Children's Hour. In April 1959, Douglas appeared on The Lucille Ball-Desi Arnaz Show as Lucy Ricardo's television morning show cohost in the episode "Lucy Wants a Career."

In 1955, Douglas appeared in the play The Caine Mutiny Court-Martial, but his union placed him on probation for allegedly saying "The South stinks. It's a land of sowbelly and segregation," which offended Southern audiences. Douglas claimed that he was misquoted.

Douglas was originally cast in the 1960 episode of The Twilight Zone called "The Mighty Casey", a role written for him by Rod Serling based on Douglas's character in Angels in the Outfield. Douglas died the day after production of the episode had been completed. He had been in the last stages of illness during filming, and his severe physical state was apparent on film; the crew incorrectly assumed that his condition was the result of heavy drinking. The comedic episode was deemed unfit for broadcast, but it was resurrected some months later with Douglas's scenes reshot with Jack Warden.

Billy Wilder, who had directed Douglas's wife Jan Sterling in Ace in the Hole (1951), had cast Douglas in the role of Mr. Sheldrake, the boss of the character played by Jack Lemmon and the lover of the character played by Shirley MacLaine, in The Apartment (1960). After Douglas's death, the role was recast with Fred MacMurray.

== Personal life ==
Douglas was married five times and divorced four times. His first wife was Susie Wells and he married his second wife Elizabeth Farnum in 1931. His third marriage to Geraldine "Gerri" Higgins was short, lasting from 1940-1941.

In 1942, Douglas married actress Virginia Field, with whom he had a daughter, Margaret. The couple divorced in 1946. On May 12, 1950, Douglas married Jan Sterling, who became his widow. They had a son, Adams, born October 20, 1955.

== Death ==
Douglas died of a heart attack at his home in Hollywood, California on September 11, 1959 at the age of 52.

== Filmography ==
- P's and Cues (1935, Short) - Narrator
- Calling All Tars (1936, Short) - Semaphore Signalman (uncredited)
- Margin for Error (1943) - Policeman at Front Desk (uncredited)
- A Letter to Three Wives (1949) - Porter Hollingsway
- It Happens Every Spring (1949) - Monk Lanigan
- Everybody Does It (1949) - Leonard Borland aka Logan Bennett
- The Big Lift (1950) - Hank Kowalski
- Love That Brute (1950) - E.L. 'Big Ed' Hanley
- Panic in the Streets (1950) - Captain Tom Warren
- Fourteen Hours (1951) - Police Officer Charlie Dunnigan
- The Guy Who Came Back (1951) - Harry Joplin
- Rhubarb (1951) - Man on Park Bench (uncredited)
- Angels in the Outfield (1951) - Aloysius X. 'Guffy' McGovern
- When in Rome (1952) - Joe Brewster
- Clash by Night (1952) - Jerry D'Amato
- We're Not Married! (1952) - Hector C. Woodruff
- Never Wave at a WAC (1953) - Andrew McBain
- Forever Female (1953) - E. Harry Phillips
- Calling Scotland Yard: Falstaff's Fur Coat (1954, Short) - Commentator
- Calling Scotland Yard: The Missing Passenger (1954, Short) - Commentator
- Calling Scotland Yard: The Final Twist (1954, Short) - Commentator
- Calling Scotland Yard: Present for a Bride (1954, Short) - Commentator
- Executive Suite (1954) - Josiah Walter Dudley
- The Maggie (1954) - Calvin B. Marshall, the American
- Calling Scotland Yard: The Javanese Dagger (1954, Short) - Commentator
- Calling Scotland Yard: The Sable Scarf (1954, Short) - Commentator
- Green Fire (1954) - Vic Leonard
- Joe MacBeth (1955) - Joe MacBeth
- The Gamma People (1956) - Mike Wilson
- The Leather Saint (1956) - Gus MacAuliffe
- The Solid Gold Cadillac (1956) - Edward L. McKeever
- Born Yesterday (1956, TV Movie) - Harry Brock
- This Could Be the Night (1957) - Rocco
- Beau James (1957) - Chris Nolan
- Fortunella (1958) - Professor Golfiero Paganica
- Suspicion (TV series) (1958) - Comfort for the Grave - Vincente Polito
- The Mating Game (1959) - Pop Larkin
- Alfred Hitchcock Presents (1959) (Season 4 Episode 35: "Touché") - Bill Fleming
- The Lucy-Desi Comedy Hour (1959) - as himself

== Radio appearances ==
Year	Program	Episode/source
1951	Suspense	Fragile-Content Death
1952	Suspense	Mann Alive
1952	Hollywood Star Playhouse	Hospital Zone, Quiet
1953	Theatre Guild on the Air	The Show-Off
