= Born Yesterday (1956 film) =

1956 television film by Garson Kanin

- Based on: Born Yesterday; 1946 play by Garson Kanin
- Written by: Garson Kanin
- Directed by: Garson Kanin
- Starring: Bill Becker; Paul Douglas; Belle Flower
- Country of origin: United States
- Original language: English

Production
- Producer: George Schaefer
- Running time: 90 minutes

Original release
- Release: October 28, 1956

Born Yesterday is a 1956 TV film based on the play Born Yesterday by Garson Kanin for the Hallmark Hall of Fame. Kanin adapted and directed it. George Schaefer helped Kanin direct but was not credited.

Mary Martin's performance was her first TV appearance since Peter Pan. The New York Times thought she was miscast.

== Plot summary ==
A rich junk dealer hires a tutor to teach his brassy lover proper etiquette, he is beginning to move up in the world, so, he wants her to be a little less uncouth. As long as she doesn't start thinking. However, that ended with unexpected results.

== Cast ==
- Mary Martin as Billie Dawn
- Paul Douglas as Harry Brock
- Arthur Hill as Paul Verrall
