= Leigh Harline =

American film composer and songwriter (1907–1969)

- Born: Leigh Adrian Harline; March 26, 1907; Salt Lake City, Utah, U.S.
- Died: December 10, 1969 (aged 62) Long Beach, California, U.S.
- Occupation: Composer

Leigh Adrian Harline (March 26, 1907 – December 10, 1969) was an American film composer and songwriter. He was best known for his work for Walt Disney Productions.

== Biography ==
Leigh Harline was born March 26, 1907, in Salt Lake City, Utah, the youngest of 13 children. Harline's parents were Swedish immigrants; his father was a soldier named Carl Härlin, and his mother was Johanna Matilda. They lived in the village of Härfsta in Simtuna Parish, but joined the Church of Jesus Christ of Latter-day Saints in 1888 and moved to Salt Lake City in 1891. After immigrating, they changed their surname to Harline.

Leigh was baptized a member of the LDS Church at age eight, and graduated from the University of Utah, where he studied piano and organ with Mormon Tabernacle Choir conductor J. Spencer Cornwall. In 1928, he moved to California and worked at radio stations in San Francisco and Los Angeles as a composer, conductor, arranger, instrumentalist, singer, and announcer. In 1931, he provided music for the first transcontinental radio broadcast to originate from the West Coast. He was then hired by Walt Disney where he scored more than 50 tunes, including for the Silly Symphonies cartoon series in the 1930s.

Harline co-scored and orchestrated music by Frank Churchill and Paul Smith specifically for Disney's first animated feature-length cartoon Snow White and the Seven Dwarfs in 1937. Snow White contained several classic songs by Churchill and lyricist Larry Morey, including "I'm Wishing", "Whistle While You Work", "Heigh-Ho", and "Some Day My Prince Will Come."

Harline re-teamed with Smith again to compose the score for Pinocchio for Disney in 1940. He also wrote most of the movie's songs with lyricist Ned Washington. The film won the Academy Award for Best Original Music Score and won both Harline and Washington the Academy Award for Best Original Song for the song "When You Wish Upon a Star". The song went on to be featured on Disney's opening logo since 1985 and serve as the official theme song of the Walt Disney Company.

Harline left Disney in 1941 to compose for other studios. His major credits include Mr. Bug Goes to Town (1941) for Disney's chief competitor Max Fleischer, the Astaire-Hayworth musical You Were Never Lovelier (1942), as well as Road to Utopia (1945), Mr. Blandings Builds His Dream House (1948), The Desert Rats (1953), The Enemy Below (1957), Ten North Frederick (1958), Warlock (1959), The Wonderful World of the Brothers Grimm (1962), The Travels of Jaimie McPheeters (1963), and 7 Faces of Dr. Lao (1964).

He died from complications of throat cancer on December 10, 1969, in Long Beach, California, and is buried in Valhalla Memorial Park Cemetery.

== Selected filmography ==
- The Goddess of Spring (1934)
- The Old Mill (1937)
- Snow White and the Seven Dwarfs (1937)
- Pinocchio (1940)
- Mr. Bug Goes to Town (1941)
- The Pride of the Yankees (1942)
- You Were Never Lovelier (1942)
- Johnny Come Lately (1943)
- Isle of the Dead (1945)
- Road to Utopia (1946)
- Crack-Up (1946)
- Nocturne (1946)
- The Bachelor and the Bobby-Soxer (1947)
- The Boy with Green Hair (1948)
- Every Girl Should Be Married (1948)
- Mr. Blandings Builds His Dream House (1948)
- It Happens Every Spring (1949)
- The Big Steal (1949)
- Monkey Business (1952)
- Pickup on South Street (1953)
- The Desert Rats (1953)
- Broken Lance (1954)
- Susan Slept Here (1954)
- House of Bamboo (1955)
- The Last Frontier (1955)
- Good Morning, Miss Dove (1955)
- 23 Paces to Baker Street (1956)
- The True Story of Jesse James (1957)
- Perry Mason (1957)
- The Wayward Bus (1957)
- The Enemy Below (1957)
- Ten North Frederick (1958)
- Man of the West (1958)
- The Remarkable Mr. Pennypacker (1959)
- Warlock (1959)
- Visit to a Small Planet (1960)
- The Honeymoon Machine (1961)
- The Wonderful World of the Brothers Grimm (1962)
- The Travels of Jaimie McPheeters (1963)
- 7 Faces of Dr. Lao (1963)
- Strange Bedfellows (1965)

== Sources ==
- A Century of Animation (includes photo)
- Disney Legends
- LDS Film Composers
