= I Wake Up Screaming =

1941 film by H. Bruce Humberstone

- Theatrical release poster
- Directed by: H. Bruce Humberstone
- Screenplay by: Dwight Taylor
- Based on: I Wake Up Screaming; 1941 novel by Steve Fisher
- Produced by: Milton Sperling
- Starring: Betty Grable; Victor Mature; Carole Landis; Laird Cregar
- Cinematography: Edward Cronjager
- Edited by: Robert L. Simpson
- Music by: Cyril J. Mockridge
- Production company: 20th Century Fox
- Distributed by: 20th Century Fox
- Release date: October 31, 1941
- Running time: 82 minutes
- Country: United States
- Language: English
- Budget: $462,500
- Box office: $1,491,500

I Wake Up Screaming (originally titled Hot Spot) is a 1941 American mystery thriller film noir. Directed by H. Bruce Humberstone, it stars Betty Grable, Victor Mature and Carole Landis, and features one of Grable's few dramatic roles. It is based on the novel of the same name by Steve Fisher, adapted by Dwight Taylor. It was produced and distributed by 20th Century Fox. The film was remade as Vicki in 1953 starring Jean Peters.

== Plot ==
The story proceeds largely through a series of flashbacks. It begins with New York sports promoter Frankie Christopher being interrogated at a police station about the murder of a young actress, Vicky Lynn. Christopher recounts first meeting Vicky as a waitress when he was at a restaurant with two friends, fading actor Robin Ray and gossip columnist Larry Evans. His friends dared Christopher to turn Vicky into a star with their help.

Christopher succeeds in building Vicky's career. However, she shocks him by signing a contract with a Hollywood producer. At her apartment, which she shares with her sister Jill, Vicky finally tells Christopher she is leaving New York. While Vicky is packing, Christopher reacts angrily before exiting. The next morning, Jill returns to the apartment to find her sister dead, with Christopher standing by her body.

At the end of the police interrogation, Detective Ed Cornell does not have enough evidence to arrest Christopher for Vicky's murder However, he is absolutely certain of his guilt and vows to bring him to justice. Over the coming days, Cornell hounds Christopher entering Christopher's home and other residences without search warrants. Desperate to clear his name, Christopher turns to Jill. She does not like him much, but believes he is innocent.

As Jill and Frankie begin to fall in love, they follow Vicky's previous movements and encounters to find the real killer. Eventually, they conclude that she had been killed by the apartment building's front desk manager, Harry Williams. He admits to the crime, but tells Frankie that Cornell already knew that he did it. Christopher, with the police close behind, goes to Cornell's apartment. They discover the walls are plastered with posters of Vicky. Cornell admits to trying to frame Christopher, due to his jealousy over Vicky.

== Cast ==
Betty Grable as Jill and Victor Mature as Frankie

- Betty Grable as Jill Lynn
- Victor Mature as Frankie Christopher
- Carole Landis as Vicky Lynn
- Laird Cregar as Ed Cornell
- William Gargan as Jerry MacDonald
- Alan Mowbray as Robin Ray
- Allyn Joslyn as Larry Evans
- Elisha Cook, Jr. as Harry Williams
- Chick Chandler as reporter
- Cyril Ring as reporter
- Morris Ankrum as asst. district attorney
- Charles Lane as Mr. Keating, florist
- Frank Orth as caretaker
- Gregory Gaye as headwaiter
- May Beatty as Mrs. Handel
- Stanley Blystone as detective (uncredited)
- Heinie Conklin as pedestrian (uncredited)

== Background ==
The movie was originally titled I Wake Up Screaming (the source novel's title) before its title was changed to Hot Spot. It then went back to I Wake Up Screaming, although it was released in some markets as Hot Spot. It was Mature's first film under his contract with 20th Century-Fox. Alice Faye was originally cast as Jill, but was replaced by Grable.

I Wake Up Screaming was rumored to be the first Hollywood picture for French actor Jean Gabin, but he first had to learn English, which conflicted with the shooting schedule.Released one month before the 1941 Japanese attack on Pearl Harbor, the columnist character refers to a rumor of a Japanese spy with a Kodak camera. The film was remade in 1953 as Vicki.

== Reception ==
=== Box office ===
The film earned a profit of $574,100.

=== Critical response ===
Film critic Dennis Schwartz gave I Wake Up Screaming a favorable review, writing:

Veteran Fox studio director H. Bruce Humberstone (Charlie Chan at the Opera / Sun Valley Serenade), whose films ranged from Charlie Chan to Tarzan, puts forth his best effort in this thrilling film noir. I Wake Up Screaming was remade in 1953 as Vicki. Dwight Taylor bases his screenplay on the book by pulp writer Steve Fisher. In a jarring move that works in an odd way, 'Somewhere Over the Rainbow' is [on] the soundtrack that can be heard throughout. This early film noir, shot in a naturalistic style, showed how dark photography can increase a brooding mood and make the film more tense ... The conclusion is filled with plot twists and surprise character revelations, as the marvelously sinister performance by Laird Cregar as the sicko detective dominates the screen.

== Music ==
I Wake Up Screaming's score, supervised by Cyril J. Mockridge, contained "Over the Rainbow" (better associated with wholesome MGM musicals) and the familiar theme from the 1931 film Street Scene, written by Alfred Newman. Also heard in the background is "These Are the Things I Love", written by Harold Barlow and Lewis Harris, which became a popular ballad during the big-band era.

== Radio adaptation ==
An adaptation of I Wake Up Screaming was broadcast on the Hollywood Star Time radio program on July 27, 1946. Brian Donlevy starred in the episode. Milton Geiger adapted the story for radio.
