= Queen of the Nile (film) =

1961 film

- Directed by: Fernando Cerchio
- Written by: Ottavio Poggi; Fernando Cerchio; John Byrne
- Starring: Jeanne Crain; Vincent Price; Edmund Purdom; Amedeo Nazzari; Liana Orfei
- Cinematography: Massimo Dallamano
- Edited by: Renato Cinquini
- Music by: Carlo Rustichelli
- Release date: 1961
- Country: Italy
- Language: Italian

Queen of the Nile (Italian: Nefertite, regina del Nilo, also known as Nefertiti, Queen of the Nile) is a 1961 Italian adventure drama film directed by Fernando Cerchio and starring Jeanne Crain, Vincent Price, Edmund Purdom and Amedeo Nazzari.

== Plot ==
Tanith and sculptor Tumas are forbidden to love one another. Amenophis becomes Pharaoh and consents to his friend Tumas to marry Tanith. Against the wishes of the High Priest Benakon, Pharaoh appoints Seper his personal priest who only worships the one sun god, Ammon.

High Priest Benakon renames Tanith to Nefertiti. He tells her that he is her father and that she will marry the new Pharaoh. Benakon plots the death of Tumas. Nefertiti only loves Tumas but marries Pharaoh Amenophis. Tumas feels betrayed but agrees to do the now famous bust sculpture of Nefertiti. They again profess their love to one another.

To protect himself and his priests and gods, Benakon attacks the temple and kills priest Seper. Pharaoh goes mad and commits suicide. While the palace is under attack, Nefertiti assumes command and declares herself "Queen of the desert". The Pharaoh's army comes in from the desert, puts down the revolt and kills Benekon. Nefertiti and Tumas are reunited.

== Cast ==
- Jeanne Crain as Tanith / Nefertiti
- Vincent Price as Benakon
- Edmund Purdom as Tumos
- Amedeo Nazzari as Amenophis IV
- Liana Orfei as Merit
- Carlo D'Angelo as Seper
- Alberto Farnese as Dakim
- Clelia Matania as Penaba
- Giulio Marchetti as Meck
- Piero Palermini as Nagor
- Umberto Raho as Zeton
- Luigi Marturano as Melad
- Raf Baldassarre as Mareb

== Release ==
The film was released in Italian cinemas by Euro International Films in 1961, and grossed 388 millions lire.

== Reception ==
The film was generally badly received by critics. In a contemporary review in La Stampa, the film is praised for its visual appearance, especially its colors, sets, and mass scenes, but criticized for its cartoonish dialogues and an overly unconstrained screenplay. Jeffrey Richards wrote: "Despite colourful costumes and sets and an action-packed finale, this was a stilted and one-dimensional affair [...] with a plethora of sub-plots". TV Guide describes it as "one of those countless inferior-quality Italian biblical epics".
