= 1943 in British radio =

This is a list of events from British radio in 1943.

== Events ==
=== January ===
- 6 January – BBC reporter Richard Dimbleby makes a live recording from a Royal Air Force nighttime bombing raid over Berlin piloted by Guy Gibson.
- 15 January – Fernand Grenier broadcasts on Radio Londres offering Communist support for Free France.

=== February ===
- 12 February – The BBC Ottringham transmitting station in east Yorkshire goes live for broadcast of propaganda to Europe.

=== March ===
- March – A BBC radio adaptation of E. Nesbit's The Railway Children is broadcast.

=== April to May ===
- Spring – The BBC Monitoring service moves from Wood Norton Hall, Worcestershire, to Caversham Park and Crowsley Park, near Reading, Berkshire.

=== June ===
- 24 June – Ralph Vaughan Williams conducts the London Philharmonic Orchestra in the premiere of his Fifth Symphony at a BBC Proms Concert in the Royal Albert Hall.

=== September ===
- 4 September – BBC reporter Wynford Vaughan-Thomas reports from an RAF nighttime bombing raid over Berlin.

=== October ===
- 17 October – The BBC Woofferton transmitting station in Shropshire begins shortwave broadcasts.
- Late October – Gustav Siegfried Eins, a British black propaganda station, ceases broadcasting to German troops in Western Europe on the short wave, ostensibly because of a Gestapo raid.

=== November ===
- 14 November – Soldatensender Calais, a British black propaganda station, begins broadcasting to German troops in Western Europe from a studio at Milton Bryan in Bedfordshire through the powerful medium wave Aspidistra transmitter in Sussex, purporting to be an official German military station.
- 23 November – British Forces Broadcasting Service begins operation serving forces overseas.
- 25–26 November – The BBC premieres The Rescue: a melodrama for broadcasting, based on the conclusion of Homer's Odyssey, written by Edward Sackville-West with music by Benjamin Britten.

=== December ===
- 3 December – London-based American war reporter Edward R. Murrow delivers his classic "Orchestrated Hell" broadcast over CBS describing an RAF nighttime bombing raid over Berlin.

== Debuts ==
- 2 August – This Week's Composer on the BBC Home Service (1943–Present) (continuing as Composer of the Week on BBC Radio 3)
- Caribbean Voices on the BBC World Service (1943–1958)

== Continuing radio programmes ==
=== 1930s ===
- In Town Tonight (1933–1960)

=== 1940s ===
- Music While You Work (1940–1967)
- Sunday Half Hour (1940–2018)
- Desert Island Discs (1942–Present)

== Births ==
- 29 January – Tony Blackburn, DJ
- 18 February – Graeme Garden, Scottish-born comedy performer
- 6 April – Roger Cook, Australasian-born investigative reporter (died 2026)
- 14 May – John Cushnie, Northern Ireland landscape designer and gardening broadcaster (died 2009)
- 30 May – Charles Collingwood, Canadian-born actor
- 17 August – John Humphrys, Welsh-born news broadcaster
- 11 September – Brian Perkins, New Zealand-born newsreader
- 28 September – Mike Dickin, DJ and presenter (died 2006)
- 18 October – Dai Jones, Welsh broadcaster (died 2022)
- 23 October – Roger Scott, DJ (died 1989)
- 26 November – Paul Burnett, DJ

== Deaths ==
- 20 November – Rev. George Bramwell Evens ('Romany'), broadcaster and writer on countryside matters (born 1884)

== See also ==
- 1943 in British music
- 1943 in British television
- 1943 in the United Kingdom
- List of British films of 1943
