= 1943 in British music =

This is a summary of 1943 in music in the United Kingdom.

== Events ==
- January
  - The Committee for the Promotion of New Music (later renamed Society for the Promotion of New Music) is founded by Francis Chagrin in London with the intention of promoting the creation, performance and appreciation of new music by young and unestablished composers. Ralph Vaughan Williams agrees to be president, with Arthur Bliss the committee's vice-president.
  - Arthur Bliss's Piano Concerto and William Walton's Belshazzar's Feast are recorded under the auspices of the British Council.
- 27 March – Michael Tippett's String Quartet No. 2 is first performed in London.
- 24 June – Ralph Vaughan Williams conducts the London Philharmonic Orchestra in the premiere of his Fifth Symphony at a Proms Concert in the Royal Albert Hall.
- 15 October – first performance of Benjamin Britten's Serenade for Tenor, Horn and Strings with soloists Peter Pears and Dennis Brain at the Wigmore Hall.

== Popular music ==
- "Don't Let's Be Beastly To The Germans" w.m. Noël Coward
- "Silver Wings In The Moonlight" w.m. Hughie Charles, Sonny Miller & Leo Towers

== Classical music: new works ==
- Benjamin Britten
  - Rejoice in the Lamb, festival cantata
  - Serenade for Tenor, Horn and Strings
- Ralph Vaughan Williams
  - The Story of a Flemish Farm
  - Symphony No. 5 in D Major
- William Walton
  - The Quest (ballet)
  - Violin Concerto (reorchestrated)

== Film and Incidental music ==
- Ralph Vaughan Williams – The Flemish Farm

== Musical theatre ==
- 17 April – Show Boat (Jerome Kern and Oscar Hammerstein II) – London revival opens at the Stoll Theatre and runs for 264 performances.
- 10 June – Sweet And Low London revue opens at the Ambassadors Theatre and runs for 264 performances.
- 17 June – The Lisbon Story, with music by Harry Parr-Davies, opens at the Hippodrome Theatre and runs for 492 performances.

== Musical films ==
- Miss London Ltd., directed by Val Guest, starring Arthur Askey and Evelyn Dall.
- Rhythm Serenade, starring Vera Lynn and Peter Murray-Hill.
- Variety Jubilee, starring Reginald Purdell and Ellis Irving
- We'll Meet Again released 18 January, starring Vera Lynn, Geraldo and Patricia Roc.

== Births ==
- 7 January – Richard Armstrong, organist and conductor
- 16 January
  - Brian Ferneyhough, composer
  - Gavin Bryars, composer
- 28 January – Dick Taylor, bass player, songwriter, and producer (The Rolling Stones, The Pretty Things, and The Mekons)
- 29 January
  - Tony Blackburn, DJ
  - Mark Wynter, singer
- 16 February – Howard Riley, English pianist and composer
- 25 February – George Harrison, guitarist, singer and songwriter (died 2001)
- 9 March – David Matthews, composer
- 22 March – Keith Relf, lead vocalist and harmonica player of the Yardbirds (died 1976)
- 29 March – Eric Idle, actor, writer, and songwriter
- 16 April
  - Ruth Madoc, actress and singer (d. 2022)
  - Lonesome Dave Peverett, English singer-songwriter and guitarist (d. 2000)
- 17 April – Elinor Bennett, harpist
- 20 April – Sir John Eliot Gardiner, conductor
- 25 April – Tony Christie, singer
- 8 May
  - Jon Mark, English-New Zealand singer-songwriter and guitarist (Sweet Thursday and Mark-Almond)
  - Paul Samwell-Smith, bass player and producer (The Yardbirds and Box of Frogs)
- 11 May – Les Chadwick, bass player (Gerry and the Pacemakers) (died 2019)
- 14 May – Jack Bruce, vocalist, guitarist and composer (died 2014)
- 15 June – Muff Winwood, record producer, songwriter, and bass player
- 17 June – Christopher Brown, composer
- 26 July – Mick Jagger, singer and actor (The Rolling Stones)
- 28 July – Richard Wright, keyboardist (Pink Floyd) (died 2008)
- 24 August – Dafydd Iwan, musician and politician
- 6 September – Roger Waters (Pink Floyd)
- 30 September – Philip Moore, organist and composer
- 3 November – Bert Jansch, folk musician (died 2011)
- 30 November – Leo Lyons, bassist
- 17 December – Dave Dee, singer (died 2009)

== Deaths ==
- 7 February – Clara Novello Davies, singer, mother of Ivor Novello, 81
- 28 March – Ben Davies, operatic tenor, 85
- 14 April – Geoffrey Shaw, church musician and composer, 63
- 25 April – William Edward Wadely, organist and composer, 89
- 3 May – Leslie Heward, conductor and composer, 45
- 30 July – Benjamin Dale, composer, 58
- 28 November – Arthur Catterall, violinist and conductor, 60
- 16 December – William Wallace, composer, 80

== See also ==
- 1943 in British television
- 1943 in the United Kingdom
- List of British films of 1943
