= List of Italian films of 1943 =

A list of films produced in Italy under Fascist rule in its final year in 1943 (see 1943 in film):

== A-L ==
Title	Director	Cast	Genre	Notes
1943
L' Amico delle donne	Ferdinando Maria Poggoili	Miriam Di San Servolo, Claudio Gora	Comedy	
Anything for a Song	Mario Mattoli	Ferruccio Tagliavini, Vera Carmi, Luisa Rossi	Musical	
Apparition	Jean de Limur	Alida Valli, Massimo Girotti, Amedeo Nazzari	Comedy	
Calafuria	Flavio Calzavara	Doris Duranti, Gustav Diessl, Olga Solbelli	Drama	
The Champion	Carlo Borghesio	Enzo Fiermonte, Vera Bergman, Erminio Spalla	Sports	
Charley's Aunt	Alfredo Guarini	Erminio Macario, Silvana Jachino, Maurizio D'Ancora	Comedy	
The Count of Monte Cristo	Robert Vernay	Pierre Richard-Willm, Michèle Alfa, Aimé Clariond	Historical	Co-production with France
Farewell Love!	Gianni Franciolini	Jacqueline Laurent, Clara Calamai, Roldano Lupi	Drama	
Fever	Primo Zeglio	Paola Barbara, Carlo Tamberlani, Mary Carrillo	Drama	Co-production with Spain
Giacomo the Idealist	Alberto Lattuada	Massimo Serato, Marina Berti, Andrea Checchi	Comedy	
Harlem	Carmine Gallone	Massimo Girotti, Amedeo Nazzari, Vivi Gioi	Crime	
Il fanciullo del West	Giorgio Ferroni	Erminio Macario, Elli Parvo	Comedy	Precursor of the spaghetti western genre
Maria Malibran	Guido Brignone	Maria Cebotari, Rossano Brazzi, Renato Cialente	Drama	
I'll Always Love You	Mario Camerini	Alida Valli, Gino Cervi, Jules Berry	Drama	
In High Places	Mario Soldati	Adriana Benetti, Massimo Serato	Comedy	
It Happened in Damascus	Primo Zeglio	Paola Barbara, Germana Paolieri, Miguel Ligero	Comedy	Co-production with Spain
The Last Wagon	Mario Mattoli	Aldo Fabrizi, Anna Magnani, Enzo Fiermonte, Anita Durante, Elide Spada, Nando Bruno, Paolo Stoppa	Comedy	Close to Italian neorealism. Written by Federico Fellini
Laugh, Pagliacci	Giuseppe Fatigati	Alida Valli, Beniamino Gigli, Carlo Romano	Drama	Co-production with Germany
Life Is Beautiful	Carlo Ludovico Bragaglia	Alberto Rabagliati, María Mercader, Anna Magnani	Comedy	
A Little Wife	Giorgio Bianchi	Fosco Giachetti, Assia Noris, Clara Calamai	Drama	
Lively Teresa	Mario Mattoli	Lilia Silvi, Roberto Villa, Carlo Ninchi	Comedy	
A Living Statue	Camillo Mastrocinque	Laura Solari, Fosco Giachetti, Camillo Pilotto	Drama	

== M-Z ==
Title	Director	Cast	Genre	Notes
The Man with a Cross	Roberto Rossellini	Alberto Tavazzi, Roswita Schmidt, Attilio Dottesio	War	Fascist propaganda film
Men of the Mountain	Aldo Vergano	Amedeo Nazzari, Mariella Lotti, Mario Ferrari	War	
Music on the Run	Carlo Ludovico Bragaglia	Gino Bechi, Irasema Dilián, Guglielmo Barnabò	Comedy	
Ossessione	Luchino Visconti	Clara Calamai, Massimo Girotti, Dhia Cristiani, Juan De Landa	Crime drama	Close to Italian neorealism; based on The Postman Always Rings Twice by James M. Cain
The Peddler and the Lady	Mario Bonnard	Aldo Fabrizi, Anna Magnani	Comedy	Close to Italian neorealism
Redemption	Marcello Albani	Carlo Tamberlani, Mario Ferrari, Camillo Pilotto	Drama	
Rita of Cascia	Antonio Leonviola	Elena Zareschi, Ugo Sasso, Beatrice Mancini	Historical	
Sad Loves	Carmine Gallone	Jules Berry, Gino Cervi, Luisa Ferida	Drama	
Seven Years of Happiness	Ernst Marischka, Roberto Savarese	Vivi Gioi, Wolf Albach-Retty, Elli Parvo	Comedy	Co-production with Germany
The Son of the Red Corsair	Marco Elter	Vittorio Sanipoli, Luisa Ferida, Memo Benassi	Adventure	
Strange Inheritance	Louis Daquin	Assia Noris, Jules Berry, Gabrielle Dorziat	Mystery	Co-production with France
T'amerò sempre	Mario Camerini	Alida Valli, Gino Cervi, Antonio Centa	Comedy	Remake of 1933 Camerini's own version
Two Hearts	Carlo Borghesio	Erzsi Simor, Osvaldo Genazzani, Nino Crisman	Romance	
Two Suffer Better Than One	Nunzio Malasomma	Carlo Ninchi, Giuditta Rissone, Marisa Vernati	Comedy	
The Valley of the Devil	Mario Mattoli	Marina Berti, Carlo Ninchi, Andrea Checchi	Historical	
The White Angel	Giulio Antamoro, Ettore Giannini	Emma Gramatica, Filippo Scelzo, Beatrice Mancini	Drama	
Without a Woman	Alfredo Guarini	Silvana Jachino, Umberto Melnati, Carlo Campanini	Comedy	
