= 1943 in film =

The year 1943 in film featured various significant events for the film industry.

== Events ==
- January 23 – The film Casablanca is released nationally in the United States and becomes one of the top-grossing pictures of 1943. It goes on to win the Best Picture and Best Director awards at the 16th Academy Awards.
- February 20 – American film studio executives agree to allow the United States Office of War Information to censor films.
- June 1 – Veteran English stage and screen actor Leslie Howard dies at the age of 50 in the crash of BOAC Flight 777 off the coast of Galicia, Spain. While best remembered for his role as Ashley Wilkes in Gone with the Wind, Howard had roles in many other notable films and was twice nominated for the Academy Award for Best Actor.
- December 31 – New York City's Times Square greets Frank Sinatra at Paramount Theatre.

== Awards ==
Category/Organization	1st Golden Globe Awards January 20, 1944	16th Academy Awards March 2, 1944
Best Film	The Song of Bernadette	Casablanca
Best Director	Henry King; The Song of Bernadette	Michael Curtiz; Casablanca
Best Actor	Paul Lukas; Watch on the Rhine	
Best Actress	Jennifer Jones; The Song of Bernadette	
Best Supporting Actor	Akim Tamiroff; For Whom the Bell Tolls	Charles Coburn; The More the Merrier
Best Supporting Actress	Katina Paxinou; For Whom the Bell Tolls	

== Top-grossing films (U.S.) ==
The top ten 1943 released films by box office gross in North America are as follows:

Highest-grossing films of 1943
Rank	Title	Distributor	Domestic rentals
1	This is the Army	Warner Bros.	$8,301,000
2	For Whom the Bell Tolls	Paramount	$6,300,000
3	The Song of Bernadette	20th Century Fox	$4,700,000
4	Stage Door Canteen	United Artists	$4,350,000
5	Star Spangled Rhythm	Paramount	$3,850,000
6	Thousands Cheer	MGM	$3,751,000
7	Casablanca	Warner Bros.	$3,398,000
8	Coney Island	20th Century Fox	$3,305,000
9	Destination Tokyo	Warner Bros.	$3,237,000
10	Dixie	Paramount	$3,100,000

== Top Ten Money Making Stars ==
Rank	Actor/Actress
1.	Betty Grable
2.	Bob Hope
3	Abbott and Costello
4.	Bing Crosby
5.	Gary Cooper
6.	Greer Garson
7.	Humphrey Bogart
8.	James Cagney
9.	Mickey Rooney
10.	Clark Gable

== Films by country/region ==
- Argentina
- Australia
- Austria
- Brazil
- Canada
- China
- Czechoslovakia
- Denmark
- Finland
- France
- Germany
- India
- Italy
- Japan
- Mexico
- Netherlands
- Norway
- Poland
- Portugal
- Soviet Union
- Spain
- Sweden
- United Kingdom
- United States

== Notable films ==
Films produced in the United States unless stated otherwise

=== A ===
- Above Suspicion, directed by Richard Thorpe, starring Joan Crawford and Fred MacMurray
- Action in the North Atlantic, directed by Lloyd Bacon, starring Humphrey Bogart and Raymond Massey
- The Adventures of Tartu, directed by Harold S. Bucquet, starring Robert Donat and Valerie Hobson – (GB)
- Air Force, directed by Howard Hawks, starring John Garfield and Harry Carey
- Angels of Sin (Les Anges du péché), directed by Robert Bresson, starring Renée Faure – (France)

=== B ===
- Background to Danger, directed by Raoul Walsh, starring George Raft, Sydney Greenstreet and Peter Lorre
- Bataan, directed by Tay Garnett, starring Robert Taylor, Thomas Mitchell and Lloyd Nolan
- The Bells Go Down, directed by Basil Dearden, starring Tommy Trinder and James Mason – (GB)
- Best Foot Forward, directed by Edward Buzzell, starring Lucille Ball and Harry James
- Bombardier, directed by Richard Wallace, starring Pat O'Brien and Randolph Scott

=== C ===
- Cabin in the Sky, directed by Vincente Minnelli, starring Ethel Waters, Eddie "Rochester" Anderson and Lena Horne
- Calling Dr. Death, directed by Reginald LeBorg, starring Lon Chaney Jr.
- Coney Island, directed by Walter Lang, starring Betty Grable, George Montgomery and Cesar Romero
- The Constant Nymph, directed by Edmund Goulding, starring Charles Boyer, Joan Fontaine, Alexis Smith and Charles Coburn
- Le Corbeau (The Raven), directed by Henri-Georges Clouzot, starring Pierre Fresnay – (France)
- Crash Dive, directed by Archie Mayo, starring Tyrone Power, Anne Baxter and Dana Andrews
- Cry 'Havoc', directed by Richard Thorpe, starring Margaret Sullavan, Ann Sothern and Joan Blondell

=== D ===
- The Dancing Masters, directed by Malcolm St. Clair, starring Laurel and Hardy
- Day of Wrath (Vredens dag), directed by Carl Theodor Dreyer – (Denmark)
- The Demi-Paradise, directed by Anthony Asquith, starring Laurence Olivier – (GB)
- Destination Tokyo, directed by Delmer Daves, starring Cary Grant and John Garfield
- Destroyer, directed by William A. Seiter, starring Glenn Ford and Edward G. Robinson
- Dixie, directed by A. Edward Sutherland, starring Bing Crosby and Dorothy Lamour
- Du Barry Was a Lady, directed by Roy Del Ruth, starring Red Skelton, Lucille Ball, Gene Kelly and Tommy Dorsey

=== E ===
- Edge of Darkness, directed by Lewis Milestone, starring Errol Flynn, Ann Sheridan and Walter Huston

=== F ===
- Five Graves to Cairo, directed by Billy Wilder, starring Franchot Tone, Anne Baxter and Erich von Stroheim
- Flesh and Fantasy, directed by Julien Duvivier, starring Edward G. Robinson, Charles Boyer, Barbara Stanwyck and Robert Cummings
- For Whom the Bell Tolls, directed by Sam Wood, starring Gary Cooper and Ingrid Bergman
- Frankenstein Meets the Wolf Man, directed by Roy William Neill, starring Lon Chaney Jr. and Béla Lugosi
- Der Fuehrer's Face, animated propaganda film directed by Jack Kinney for Walt Disney Productions, featuring Donald Duck

=== G ===
- The Gang's All Here, directed by Busby Berkeley, starring Alice Faye, Carmen Miranda and Benny Goodman
- The Ghost Ship, directed by Mark Robson, starring Richard Dix
- Girl Crazy, directed by Norman Taurog and Busby Berkeley, starring Mickey Rooney, Judy Garland and Tommy Dorsey
- Guadalcanal Diary, directed by Lewis Seiler, starring Preston Foster, Lloyd Nolan, William Bendix, Richard Conte and Anthony Quinn
- A Guy Named Joe, directed by Victor Fleming, starring Spencer Tracy and Irene Dunne

=== H ===
- Hangmen Also Die!, directed by Fritz Lang, starring Brian Donlevy and Walter Brennan
- The Hard Way, directed by Vincent Sherman, starring Ida Lupino, Dennis Morgan and Joan Leslie
- Heaven Can Wait, directed by Ernst Lubitsch, starring Gene Tierney, Don Ameche and Charles Coburn
- Hello, Frisco, Hello, directed by H. Bruce Humberstone, starring Alice Faye, John Payne and Jack Oakie
- Hit the Ice, directed by Charles Lamont, starring Abbott and Costello
- Holy Matrimony, directed by Charles Lamont, starring Monty Woolley and Gracie Fields
- The Human Comedy, directed by Clarence Brown, starring Mickey Rooney and Frank Morgan

=== I ===
- I Walked with a Zombie, directed by Jacques Tourneur, starring Frances Dee and Tom Conway
- In Old Oklahoma (reissued as War of the Wildcats in 1947), directed by Albert S. Rogell, starring John Wayne and Martha Scott
- It Ain't Hay, directed by Erle C. Kenton, starring Abbott and Costello

=== J ===
- Jane Eyre, directed by Robert Stevenson, starring Orson Welles and Joan Fontaine
- Journey into Fear, directed by Norman Foster, starring Joseph Cotten, Dolores del Río and Orson Welles

=== K ===
- Kismet (Fate), directed by Gyan Mukherjee, starring Ashok Kumar – (India)

=== L ===
- Lassie Come Home, directed by Fred M. Wilcox, starring Roddy McDowall and Donald Crisp
- The Leopard Man, directed by Jacques Tourneur, starring Dennis O'Keefe and Margo
- The Life and Death of Colonel Blimp, directed by Michael Powell and Emeric Pressburger, starring Deborah Kerr, Anton Walbrook and Roger Livesey – (GB)

=== M ===
- The Mad Ghoul, directed by James P. Hogan, starring Turhan Bey
- Madame Curie, directed by Mervyn LeRoy, starring Greer Garson and Walter Pidgeon
- The Man in Grey, directed by Leslie Arliss, starring Margaret Lockwood, James Mason, Phyllis Calvert and Stewart Granger – (GB)
- Meshes of the Afternoon, directed by and starring Maya Deren and Alexander Hammid
- Millions Like Us, directed by Sidney Gilliat and Frank Launder, starring Patricia Roc – (GB)
- Mission to Moscow, directed by Michael Curtiz, starring Walter Huston and Ann Harding
- The More the Merrier, directed by George Stevens, starring Jean Arthur, Joel McCrea and Charles Coburn
- Mr. Lucky, directed by H. C. Potter, starring Cary Grant and Laraine Day
- Münchhausen, directed by Josef von Báky, starring Hans Albers – (Germany)

=== N ===
- Nasreddin in Bukhara, directed by Yakov Protazanov – (USSR)
- No Time for Love, directed by Mitchell Leisen, starring Claudette Colbert and Fred MacMurray
- The North Star, directed by Lewis Milestone, starring Anne Baxter and Dana Andrews
- Northern Pursuit, directed by Raoul Walsh, starring Errol Flynn

=== O ===
- Old Acquaintance, directed by Vincent Sherman, starring Bette Davis, Miriam Hopkins and Gig Young
- Ossessione (Obsession), directed by Luchino Visconti, starring Clara Calamai and Massimo Girotti – (Italy)
- The Outlaw, directed by Howard Hughes, starring Jane Russell, Thomas Mitchell and Walter Huston
- The Ox-Bow Incident, directed by William A. Wellman, starring Henry Fonda and Dana Andrews

=== P ===
- Phantom of the Opera, directed by Arthur Lubin, starring Nelson Eddy and Claude Rains
- Prelude to War, propaganda film directed by Frank Capra
- Princess O'Rourke, directed by Norman Krasna, starring Olivia de Havilland, Robert Cummings and Charles Coburn

=== R ===
- The Return of the Vampire, directed by Lew Landers, starring Béla Lugosi

=== S ===
- Sahara, directed by Zoltan Korda, starring Humphrey Bogart
- Sanshiro Sugata, directed by Akira Kurosawa, starring Susumu Fujita – (Japan)
- The Seventh Victim, directed by Mark Robson, starring Tom Conway
- Shadow of a Doubt, directed by Alfred Hitchcock, starring Teresa Wright and Joseph Cotten
- Sherlock Holmes Faces Death, directed by Roy William Neill, starring Basil Rathbone and Nigel Bruce
- Sherlock Holmes in Washington, directed by Roy William Neill, starring Basil Rathbone and Nigel Bruce
- The Sky's the Limit, directed by Edward H. Griffith, starring Fred Astaire and Joan Leslie
- So Proudly We Hail!, directed by Mark Sandrich, starring Claudette Colbert, Paulette Goddard and Veronica Lake
- Son of Dracula, directed by Robert Siodmak, starring Lon Chaney Jr.
- The Song of Bernadette, directed by Henry King, starring Jennifer Jones and Charles Bickford
- Squadron Leader X (lost), directed by Lance Comfort, starring Eric Portman and Ann Dvorak – (GB)
- Stage Door Canteen, directed by Frank Borzage, featuring an ensemble cast
- Stormy Weather, directed by Andrew L. Stone, starring Lena Horne, Bill Robinson, Cab Calloway, Katherine Dunham, the Nicholas Brothers and Fats Waller

=== T ===
- Tender Comrade, directed by Edward Dmytryk, starring Ginger Rogers and Robert Ryan
- Thank Your Lucky Stars, directed by David Butler, starring Eddie Cantor, Joan Leslie and Dennis Morgan
- This is the Army, directed by Michael Curtiz, starring George Murphy, Joan Leslie and Ronald Reagan
- This Land Is Mine, directed by Jean Renoir, starring Charles Laughton, Maureen O'Hara and George Sanders
- Thousands Cheer, directed by George Sidney, starring Kathryn Grayson, Gene Kelly and Mary Astor
- Titanic, directed by Herbert Selpin and Werner Klingler – (Germany)

=== V ===
- Victory Through Air Power, animated propaganda film produced by Walt Disney Productions

=== W ===
- Watch on the Rhine, directed by Herman Shumlin, starring Bette Davis and Paul Lukas
- We Dive at Dawn, directed by Anthony Asquith, starring John Mills – (GB)

== Release dates ==
United States

=== January–March ===
- January 1943
  - 12 January
    - Shadow of a Doubt
  - 23 January
    - Casablanca
- February 1943
  - 3 February
    - Air Force
  - 5 February
    - The Outlaw
  - 11 February
    - No Place for a Lady
  - 12 February
    - Journey into Fear
    - Star Spangled Rhythm
  - 19 February
    - Saludos Amigos
  - 20 February
    - The Hard Way
- March 1943
  - 1 March
    - Squadron Leader X (GB)
  - 2 March
    - The Human Comedy
  - 3 March
    - Münchhausen (Germany)
  - 5 March
    - Frankenstein Meets the Wolf Man
  - 10 March
    - It Ain't Hay
  - 11 March
    - Hello, Frisco, Hello
  - 15 March
    - The Silver Fleet (GB)
  - 19 March
    - Hitler's Children
  - 22 March
    - Huella de luz (Spain)
  - 25 March
    - Sanshiro Sugata (Japan)
  - 26 March
    - Forever and a Day
  - 27 March
    - Hangmen Also Die!

=== April–June ===
- April 1943
  - 2 April
    - Border Patrol
  - 9 April
    - Cabin in the Sky
    - It Comes Up Love
  - 12 April
    - Fires Were Started
  - 15 April
    - We Dive at Dawn
  - 22 April
    - Crash Dive
  - 23 April
    - Clancy Street Boys
  - 24 April
    - Edge of Darkness
  - 30 April
    - I Walked with a Zombie
    - Sherlock Holmes in Washington
- May 1943
  - 4 May
    - Five Graves to Cairo
  - 7 May
    - They Came to Blow Up America
    - This Land Is Mine
  - 8 May
    - The Leopard Man
  - 12 May
    - Stage Door Canteen
  - 13 May
    - The More the Merrier
  - 14 May
    - Bombardier
  - 16 May
    - Ossessione (Italy)
  - 17 May
    - The Bells Go Down
  - 21 May
    - Action in the North Atlantic
    - Cowboy in Manhattan
    - The Ox-Bow Incident
  - 22 May
    - Mission to Moscow
  - 27 May
    - Prelude to War
  - 28 May
    - Mr. Lucky
- June 1943
  - 2 June
    - Hit the Ice
  - 3 June
    - Bataan
  - 10 June
    - The Life and Death of Colonel Blimp
  - 11 June
    - Coney Island
  - 22 June
    - Crime Doctor
  - 23 June
    - Angels of the Streets (France)
    - Dixie
    - The Constant Nymph

=== July–September ===
- July 1943
  - 3 July
    - Background to Danger
  - 14 July
    - For Whom the Bell Tolls
  - 17 July
    - Victory Through Air Power
  - 21 July
    - Stormy Weather
  - 26 July
    - Theatre Royal (GB)
- August 1943
  - 1 August
    - Behind the Rising Sun
  - 2 August
    - Hi Diddle Diddle
    - Nasreddin in Bukhara (U.S.S.R.)
  - 11 August
    - Heaven Can Wait
  - 12 August
    - Phantom of the Opera
  - 14 August
    - This Is the Army
  - 19 August
    - Destroyer
    - DuBarry Was a Lady
  - 21 August
    - The Seventh Victim
  - 23 August
    - The Man in Grey (GB)
  - 27 August
    - Holy Matrimony
    - Watch on the Rhine
  - 30 August
    - We've Never Been Licked
- September 1943
  - 2 September
    - The Sky's the Limit
  - 9 September
    - So Proudly We Hail!
  - 10 September
    - The Kansan
  - 13 September
    - Thousands Cheer
  - 16 September
    - Doña Bárbara (Mexico)
  - 17 September
    - Revenge of the Zombies
    - Sherlock Holmes Faces Death
    - Top Man
  - 24 September
    - The Adventures of Tartu (GB)
  - 25 September
    - Thank Your Lucky Stars
  - 28 September
    - Le Corbeau (France)
  - 29 September
    - Corvette K-225

=== October–December ===
- October 1943
  - 7 October
    - Lassie Come Home
  - 8 October
    - Best Foot Forward
    - Crazy House
  - 13 October
    - L'Éternel retour (France)
  - 19 October
    - Yellow Canary (GB)
  - 23 October
    - Princess O'Rourke
  - 29 October
    - Flesh and Fantasy
- November 1943
  - 4 November
    - The North Star
  - 5 November
    - Guadalcanal Diary
    - Millions Like Us (GB)
    - Son of Dracula
  - 10 November
    - No Time for Love
    - Titanic (Germany)
  - 11 November
    - The Return of the Vampire
    - Sahara
  - 12 November
    - The Mad Ghoul
  - 13 November
    - Day of Wrath (Denmark)
    - Northern Pursuit
  - 19 November
    - The Dancing Masters
  - 23 November
    - Cry 'Havoc'
  - 26 November
    - Girl Crazy
  - 27 November
    - Old Acquaintance
- December 1943
  - 3 December
    - Happy Land
  - 6 December
    - War of the Wildcats
  - 14 December
    - The Shipbuilders (GB)
  - 15 December
    - Destination Tokyo
    - Madame Curie
  - 17 December
    - Calling Dr. Death
    - Immensee (Germany)
  - 20 December
    - The Demi-Paradise (GB)
  - 24 December
    - The Gang's All Here
    - The Ghost Ship
    - Jack London
  - 25 December
    - The Song of Bernadette
  - 29 December
    - Tender Comrade
  - 31 December
    - The Woman of the Town

== Serials ==
- Adventures of the Flying Cadets
- The Adventures of Smilin' Jack
- Batman, starring Lewis Wilson
- Daredevils of the West, starring Allan Lane, directed by John English
- Don Winslow of the Coast Guard
- G-Men vs the Black Dragon, starring Rod Cameron, directed by Spencer Gordon Bennet
- The Masked Marvel, directed by Spencer Gordon Bennet
- The Phantom, starring Tom Tyler
- Secret Service in Darkest Africa, starring Rod Cameron, directed by Spencer Gordon Bennet

== Comedy film series ==
- Buster Keaton (1917–1944)
- Laurel and Hardy (1921-1945)
- Our Gang (1922–1944)
- The Marx Brothers (1929–1946)
- The Three Stooges (1934–1959)

== Animated short film series ==
- Mickey Mouse (1928–1953)
- Looney Tunes (1930–1969)
- Terrytoons (1930–1964)
- Merrie Melodies (1931–1969)
- Popeye (1933–1957)
- Color Rhapsodies (1934–1949)
- Donald Duck (1934–1956)
- Daffy Duck (1937 – 1966)
- Goofy (1939–1955)
- Andy Panda (1939–1949)
- Tom and Jerry (1940–1958)
- Woody Woodpecker (1941–1949)
- Swing Symphonies (1941–1945)
- The Fox and the Crow (1941–1950)
- Red Hot Riding Hood (1943–1949)
- Chip 'n' Dale (1943–1956)
- Droopy (1943–1958)

== Births ==
- January 1
  - Stanley Kamel, American actor (died 2008)
  - Don Novello, American writer, film director, producer, actor, singer and comedian
- January 13 – Richard Moll, American actor (died 2023)
- January 14 – Holland Taylor, American actress
- January 18
  - Paul Angelis, English actor and writer (died 2009)
  - Paul Freeman, English actor
- January 19 – Larry Clark, American director, producer and writer
- January 23 - Gil Gerard, American actor (died 2025)
- January 24 – Sharon Tate, American actress and model (murdered 1969)
- January 25 – Tobe Hooper, American director and screenwriter (died 2017)
- January 26
  - Soad Hosny, Egyptian actress (died 2001)
  - Kathryn Leigh Scott, American actress and writer
- January 28 – John Beck, American actor
- January 31 – Peter McRobbie, Scottish-born American actor
- February 1 – Linda Gaye Scott, American actress
- February 3
  - Blythe Danner, American actress
  - Seizō Fukumoto, Japanese actor (died 2021)
- February 5 – Michael Mann, American director, screenwriter and producer
- February 9 – Joe Pesci, American actor
- February 13 – Donald Sumpter, British actor
- February 20 – Mike Leigh, English director
- February 25 – George Harrison, English musician and songwriter (died 2001)
- February 26 – Bill Duke, American actor and director
- March 8 – Lynn Redgrave, English actress (died 2010)
- March 15 – David Cronenberg, Canadian director and screenwriter
- March 25 – Paul Michael Glaser, American actor and director
- March 26 – Giusi Merli, Italian actress
- March 28 – Conchata Ferrell, American actress (died 2020)
- March 29
  - Eric Idle, English actor, comedian, author and musician
  - Vangelis, Greek-born film composer (died 2022)
- March 31 – Christopher Walken, American actor
- April 3 – Jonathan Lynn, English director, producer, writer and actor
- April 5 – Max Gail, American actor
- April 8 – Jack O'Halloran, American actor
- April 10 – Tom Pollock, American producer (died 2020)
- April 20 – Edie Sedgwick, American actress, socialite, model and heiress (died 1971)
- April 26 – Leon Pownall, Welsh-Canadian actor (died 2006)
- May 5 – Michael Palin, English actor, comedian and musician
- May 7 – Donal McCann, Irish actor (died 1999)
- May 10 – David Clennon, American actor
- May 21 – - Shannon Wilcox, American character actress (died 2023)
- May 25 – Leslie Uggams, American actress and singer
- May 27 – Raye Birk, American actor
- June 2
  - Charles Haid, American actor and film director
  - Kevork Malikyan, English-Armenian actor
- June 4 – Tom Luddy, American producer (died 2023)
- June 7 – Michael Pennington, English actor, director and writer (died 2026)
- June 8 – Colin Baker, English actor
- June 11
  - Annabella Incontrera, Italian film and television actress (died 2004)
  - Oleg Vidov, Russian-American actor, director and producer (died 2017)
- June 13 – Malcolm McDowell, English actor
- June 19 – Peter Belli, Danish actor and singer (died 2023)
- June 22
  - Judith Barker, English actress
  - Klaus Maria Brandauer, Austrian actor and director
- June 23 – Patrick Bokanowski, French director
- June 24 – George Stanford Brown, American actor and director
- June 26 - John Beasley, American actor (died 2023)
- July 3 – Kurtwood Smith, American actor
- July 7 – Robert East, Welsh actor
- July 11 – Tom Holland, American screenwriter, actor and director
- July 20 - Christopher Murney, American actor
- July 21
  - Michael Caton, Australian actor, comedian and television host
  - Edward Herrmann, American actor (died 2014)
- July 25 – Janet Margolin, American actress (died 1993)
- July 26 – Mick Jagger, English singer, songwriter, actor, filmmaker and dancer
- July 28 – Frances Lee McCain, American actress
- July 29
  - Charles Hallahan, American actor (died 1997)
  - Jim Ishida, Japanese-American character actor
- August 2 – Richard Fancy, American actor and comedian
- August 6 – Ray Buktenica, American character actor
- August 15 – Barbara Bouchet, German-American actress
- August 17 – Robert De Niro, American actor
- August 18 – Martin Mull, American actor and comedian (died 2024)
- August 20 – Sylvester McCoy, Scottish actor
- August 21
  - Lino Capolicchio, Italian actor, screenwriter and director (died 2022)
  - Hugh Wilson, American director, writer, television showrunner and actor (died 2018)
- August 27 – Tuesday Weld, American actress
- August 28 – David Soul, American-British actor and singer (died 2024)
- August 30 – Miri Fabian, Israeli actress
- September 1 – Don Stroud, American actor and musician
- September 3 – Valerie Perrine, American actress and model (died 2026)
- September 5 – Jack Charles, Australian actor (died 2022)
- September 6 – Roger Waters, English singer-songwriter, musician and political activist
- September 9 – Art LaFleur, American character actor and acting coach (died 2021)
- September 10 – Daniel Truhitte, American actor
- September 18 – Gailard Sartain, American actor (died 2025)
- September 19 – Diana Bellamy, American character actress (died 2001)
- September 21 – Jerry Bruckheimer, American producer
- September 23 – Toni Basil, American singer, actress and director
- September 24 – Randall Duk Kim, Korean American stage, film and television actor
- September 28 – J. T. Walsh, American character actor (died 1998)
- September 30 – Ian Ogilvy, English actor, playwright and novelist
- October 4 – John Bindon, English actor and bodyguard (died 1993)
- October 5 – Jennifer Hagan, Australian actress
- October 8 – Chevy Chase, American actor and comedian
- October 9 – Peter Faber, Dutch actor (died 2026)
- October 12 – Lin Shaye, American actress
- October 15 – Penny Marshall, American television actress, film director and producer (died 2018)
- October 16 – Christopher Mitchum, American film actor, screenwriter, and businessman
- October 20 – George Wyner, American actor
- October 22
  - Jan de Bont, Dutch cinematographer, director and producer
  - Catherine Deneuve, French actress
- October 24 – Martin Campbell, New Zealand director
- October 27 – Carmen Argenziano, American actor (died 2019)
- October 29
  - Christopher Cain, American director, screenwriter and producer
  - Margaret Nolan, English actress (died 2020)
  - Don Simpson, American producer, screenwriter and actor (died 1996)
- November 1 – John McEnery, English actor and writer (died 2019)
- November 5 – Sam Shepard, American actor (died 2017)
- November 7 – Michael Byrne, British actor (died 2026)
- November 10 – William Hoyland, English actor (died 2017)
- November 12
  - Valerie Leon, English actress and model
  - Wallace Shawn, American actor
- November 16 – Wai Ching Ho, Hong Kong actress (died 2026)
- November 17 – Olga Damani, Greek actress
- November 20 – Mie Hama, Japanese former actress, television presenter, radio presenter, and author
- November 23 – Tony Bonner, Australian actor and singer
- November 28
  - George T. Miller, Scottish-Australian director and producer (died 2023)
  - Randy Newman, American singer, film composer
- November 30 - Letty Aronson, American producer
- December 2 – Henry Kingi, American stuntman and actor
- December 8 – Mary Woronov, American actress and writer
- December 12
  - Gianni Russo, American actor and singer
  - Phyllis Somerville, American actress (died 2020)
- December 13 – Arturo Ripstein, Mexican director
- December 16 – Patti Deutsch, American voice artist, actress and comedian (died 2017)
- December 19 – Sam Kelly, English actor (died 2014)
- December 21 – Jack Nance, American actor (died 1996)
- December 23 – Harry Shearer, American voice actor
- December 25
  - David Darlow, American actor
  - Hanna Schygulla, German actress
- December 31
  - Ben Kingsley, English actor
  - Victor Raider-Wexler, American actor

== Deaths ==
- January 25 – Spencer Charters, 67, American actor, The Affairs of Jimmy Valentine, The Postman Didn't Ring
- February 14 – Dora Gerson, 43, German actress, Caravan of Death, On the Brink of Paradise, murdered in Auschwitz concentration camp
- February 19 – Lynne Overman, 58, American actor, Little Miss Marker, Union Pacific, Dixie
- February 20 – Donald Haines, 23, American child actor, Skippy, A Tale of Two Cities, killed in action on North Africa campaign
- March 10 – Tully Marshall, 78, American actor, Paid in Full, The Big Trail
- April 3 – Conrad Veidt, 50, German actor, Casablanca, The Cabinet of Dr. Caligari, The Thief of Baghdad, The Spy in Black, heart attack
- June 1 – Leslie Howard, 50, Academy Award-nominated British actor, Gone with the Wind, Pygmalion, The Petrified Forest, Of Human Bondage, aviation accident
- June 30 – Carlo Wieth, 57, Danish actor, heart attack
- July 16 – Arthur Byron, 71, American actor, 20,000 Years in Sing Sing, Gabriel Over the White House
- November 24 – Frank Sheridan, 74, American actor

== Film debuts ==
- June Allyson – Best Foot Forward
- John Alvin – Northern Pursuit
- Stanley Baker – Undercover
- Jim Bannon – Riders of the Deadline
- Alfie Bass – Far into the Night
- William Bishop – Pilot No. 5
- Sunset Carson – Stage Door Canteen
- Linda Christian – The Rock of Souls
- Virginia Christine – Truck Busters
- Rita Corday – Hitler's Children
- Jeanne Crain – The Gang's All Here
- Hume Cronyn – Shadow of a Doubt
- Ross Elliott – This Is the Army
- María Félix – The Rock of Souls
- Fernando Fernán Gómez – Cristina Guzmán
- Rhonda Fleming – In Old Oklahoma
- Nina Foch – The Return of the Vampire
- Dorothy Ford – Thousands Cheer
- Howard Freeman – Margin for Error
- Farley Granger – The North Star
- Fred Griffiths – Nine Men
- Barbara Hale – Gildersleeve's Bad Day
- Edward Hardwicke – A Guy Named Joe
- Myron Healey – Salute to the Marines
- Gladys Henson – The Demi-Paradise
- John Hodiak – A Stranger in Town
- Harry Holcombe – The Purple V
- Kim Hunter – The Seventh Victim
- Richard Jaeckel – Guadalcanal Diary
- Adele Jergens – Hello Frisco, Hello
- Ulf Johanson – Queen for a Night
- Henry Jones – This Is the Army
- Katy Jurado – No matarás
- Lily Kann – The Flemish Farm
- Jack Lambert – Stage Door Canteen
- Paul Langton – We've Never Been Licked
- Nelson Leigh – Appointment in Berlin
- Sven Lindberg – Elvira Madigan
- Moira Lister – The Shipbuilders
- Peggy Maley – A Guy Named Joe
- Dorothy Malone – Gildersleeve on Broadway
- Maurice Marsac – Paris After Dark
- Virginia Mayo – Follies Girl
- Dorothy McGuire – Claudia
- Gary Merrill – This Is the Army
- Martin Miller – Squadron Leader X
- Robert Mitchum – The Human Comedy
- Shirley O'Hara – Around the World
- Gigi Perreau – Madame Curie
- Robert Quarry – Shadow of a Doubt
- Elaine Riley – Gildersleeve on Broadway
- Roy Roberts – Guadalcanal Diary
- Cliff Robertson – We've Never Been Licked
- Ruth Roman – Stage Door Canteen
- Hayden Rorke – This Is the Army
- Alberto Sorrentino – L'ultima carrozzella
- Virgílio Teixeira – O Costa do Castelo
- Lawrence Tierney – Gildersleeve on Broadway
- Ivan Triesault – Mission to Moscow
- Sonny Tufts – So Proudly We Hail!
- Peter van Eyck – Hitler's Children
- Geraldine Wall – The Song of Bernadette
- Jean Willes – So Proudly We Hail!
- Shelley Winters – There's Something About a Soldier
- Natalie Wood – Happy Land
- Ward Wood – Air Force
