= List of British films of 1943 =

A list of films produced in the United Kingdom in 1943:

== 1943 ==
Title	Director	Cast	Genre	Notes
1943
The Adventures of Tartu	Harold S. Bucquet	Robert Donat, Valerie Hobson	Drama	
Battle for Music	Donald Taylor	Joss Ambler, Warwick Braithwaite	Musical/drama	
The Bells Go Down	Basil Dearden	Tommy Trinder, James Mason, Mervyn Johns	World War II	
The Butler's Dilemma	Leslie S. Hiscott	Francis L. Sullivan, Judy Kelly	Comedy	
The Dark Tower	John Harlow	Ben Lyon, Anne Crawford	Thriller	
Deadlock	Ronald Haines	John Slater, Molly Hamley-Clifford	Crime	
Dear Octopus	Harold French	Margaret Lockwood, Michael Wilding	Comedy	
Death by Design	Germain Burger	John Longden, Wally Patch	Crime	
The Demi-Paradise	Anthony Asquith	Laurence Olivier, Penelope Dudley-Ward	Comedy	
Desert Victory	David MacDonald		Propaganda documentary	
Down Melody Lane	Frank Dormand	Billy Cotton, Eve Becke	Musical	
The Dummy Talks	Oswald Mitchell	Jack Warner, Claude Hulbert	Crime	
Escape to Danger	Lance Comfort, Victor Hanbury	Eric Portman, Ann Dvorak	Thriller	
Fires Were Started	Humphrey Jennings	Cyril Demarne	World War II	Number 89 in the list of BFI Top 100 British films
The Flemish Farm	Jeffrey Dell	Clive Brook, Jane Baxter	War	
The Gentle Sex	Leslie Howard	Jean Gillie, Joan Greenwood, Joyce Howard	World War II	
Get Cracking	Marcel Varnel	George Formby, Dinah Sheridan	Comedy	
Happidrome	Philip Brandon	Harry Korris, Robbie Vincent	Comedy	
I'll Walk Beside You	Maclean Rogers	Richard Bird, Lesley Brook, Percy Marmont	Drama	
It's That Man Again	Walter Forde	Tommy Handley, Greta Gynt	Comedy	
The Lamp Still Burns	Maurice Elvey	Rosamund John, Stewart Granger, Godfrey Tearle	Drama	
The Life and Death of Colonel Blimp	Michael Powell, Emeric Pressburger	Deborah Kerr, Roger Livesey, Anton Walbrook	World War II	Number 45 in the list of BFI Top 100 British films
The Man in Grey	Leslie Arliss	Margaret Lockwood, James Mason	Romance/drama	
Millions Like Us	Sidney Gilliat, Frank Launder	Patricia Roc, Gordon Jackson	Drama	
Miss London Ltd.	Val Guest	Arthur Askey, Evelyn Dall	Musical comedy	Directorial debut of Guest
My Learned Friend	Basil Dearden	Will Hay	Comedy	
The New Lot	Carol Reed	Eric Ambler, Robert Donat	Drama	
The Night Invader	Herbert Mason	David Farrar, Anne Crawford	World War II	
Nine Men	Harry Watt	Jack Lambert, Gordon Jackson	World War II	
Old Mother Riley Detective	Lance Comfort	Arthur Lucan, Kitty McShane	Comedy	
Old Mother Riley Overseas	Oswald Mitchell	Arthur Lucan, Kitty McShane	Comedy	
Rhythm Serenade	Gordon Wellesley	Vera Lynn, Peter Murray-Hill	Musical	
San Demetrio London	Charles Frend	Arthur Young, Walter Fitzgerald	War	
Schweik's New Adventures	Karel Lamač	Lloyd Pearson, Maggie Rennie	Comedy	
The Shipbuilders	John Baxter	Clive Brook, Morland Graham	Drama	
The Silent Village	Humphrey Jennings	No professional actors used	World War II drama documentary	
The Silver Fleet	Vernon Sewell, Gordon Wellesley	Ralph Richardson, Googie Withers	World War II	
Somewhere in Civvies	Maclean Rogers	Frank Randle, George Doonan	Comedy	
Somewhere on Leave	John E. Blakeley	Frank Randle, Dan Young	Comedy	
Squadron Leader X	Lance Comfort	Eric Portman, Ann Dvorak	World War II	
Theatre Royal	John Baxter	Bud Flanagan, Chesney Allen	Comedy	
They Met in the Dark	Karel Lamač	James Mason, Joyce Howard	Thriller	
Thursday's Child	Rodney Ackland	Sally Ann Howes, Stewart Granger	Drama	
Tomorrow We Live	George King	John Clements, Godfrey Tearle, Greta Gynt	World War II	
Undercover	Sergei Nolbandov	John Clements, Mary Morris	War	
Up with the Lark	Philip Brandon	Ethel Revnell, Gracie West	Comedy	
Variety Jubilee	Maclean Rogers	Reginald Purdell, Ellis Irving	Musical	
Warn That Man	Lawrence Huntington	Gordon Harker, Raymond Lovell	Thriller	
We Dive at Dawn	Anthony Asquith	John Mills, Eric Portman	World War II	
We'll Meet Again	Philip Brandon	Vera Lynn, Patricia Roc	Musical	
When We Are Married	Lance Comfort	Sydney Howard, Raymond Huntley, Olga Lindo	Comedy	
Women Aren't Angels	Lawrence Huntington	Robertson Hare, Alfred Drayton	Comedy	
Yellow Canary	Herbert Wilcox	Anna Neagle, Richard Greene	World War II	

== See also ==
- 1943 in British music
- 1943 in British television
- 1943 in the United Kingdom
