= Reginaldo Giuliani =

Italian priest and military chaplain (1887–1936)

Reginaldo Giuliani (Turin, 28 August 1887 – Warieu Pass, Ethiopia, 21 January 1936), better known as Father Giuliani, was a Dominican friar, a soldier and Italian writer.

== Life ==

When World War I broke out Father Giuliani enlisted in the Italian Army as Chaplain and fought in the trenches with the Third Army Corps Arditi, the special Unit of the World War I Italian Army; for gallantry in action, he was awarded two bronze medals and a silver medal. After the war, he took part with the "Catholic Legionnaires" in the seizure of Fiume under Gabriele d'Annunzio, the city on the Dalmatian coast, formerly part of the Austro-Hungarian Empire, which Italy felt was "Denied" after the victory. After a turbulent period of four years, Fiume was eventually annexed to Italy in 1924. He also took part in the Fascist March on Rome.

In 1926, Father Giuliani wrote a book about his experience in World War I entitled "The Arditi". The book was published in Milan by Fratelli Treves Editori and included a brief History of the Third Army Corps Arditi.

In 1936, during the Italian invasion of Ethiopia, he enthusiastically enlisted in the Army again, seeing this war against Ethiopia as an opportunity for a new religious crusade against heretics and infidels, and as a tool to export European civilization. Father Giuliani was assigned to the troops under the command of General Diamanti. He fell during the battle of the Warieu Pass (see First Battle of Tembien), while attempting to rescue wounded soldiers. In 1936, as a tribute to his sacrifice, he was posthumously awarded the Gold Medal of Military Valor. The citation concludes: "A blow of a scimitar, brandished by a barbarian hand, cut short his terrestrial existence: ending the life of an apostle and beginning that of a martyr."

In 1937, the book, "the Cross and Sword" with his letters and articles written during the Ethiopian campaign, was published in Turin.

== Legacy ==
In 1939, the Italian Royal Navy commissioned a submarine of the Liuzzi class with its name. After the Italian armistice in September 1943, the submarine was seized by the Japanese and given to the Germans, and commissioned into the German Navy as UIT.23. UIT 23 was later sunk by HMS Tally-ho.

Roberto Rossellini's movie, The Man with a Cross, released in 1943, was loosely based on Reginaldo Giuliani's life.

Several Italian towns have streets or squares named after Father Reginaldo Giuliani:

- Chieri (Turin)
- Aramengo (Asti)
- Cameri (Novara)
- La Spezia
- Milan
- Cernusco sul Naviglio (Milan)
- Inzago (Milan)
- Monza
- Lissone (Monza and Brianza)
- Busto Arsizio (Varese)
- Saronno (Varese)
- Cavaria con Premezzo (Varese)
- Bolzano
- Mestre (Venice)
- Padua
- Montagnana (Padua)
- Florence
- Latina
- Rome
- Capri (Naples)
- Sorrento (Naples)
- Canosa di Puglia (Barletta-Andria-Trani)
- Molochio (Reggio Calabria)

== Bibliography ==
- Gennero, Carlo (1936). Padre Giuliani, Ardito. Turin: Libreria Editrice O. Mattalia.
