= Dixie (film) =

1943 film by A. Edward Sutherland

- Theatrical release poster
- Directed by: A. Edward Sutherland
- Written by: Karl Tunberg; Darrell Ware; Claude Binyon (adaptation)
- Story by: William Rankin
- Produced by: Paul Jones
- Starring: Bing Crosby; Dorothy Lamour
- Cinematography: William C. Mellor
- Edited by: William Shea
- Music by: Jimmy Van Heusen; Johnny Burke
- Production company: Paramount Pictures
- Distributed by: Paramount Pictures
- Release date: June 23, 1943 (New York City)
- Running time: 89 minutes
- Country: United States
- Language: English
- Box office: $3.1 million (U.S. and Canada rentals)

Dixie is a 1943 American biographical film of composer and songwriter Daniel Decatur Emmett directed by A. Edward Sutherland and starring Bing Crosby and Dorothy Lamour. Filmed in Technicolor, Dixie was a box-office hit, and introduced one of Crosby's most popular songs, "Sunday, Monday, or Always". Critical reception to the film was mixed, however.

Dixie contains depictions that would be offensive to 21st century audiences – most notably, Crosby's performance in blackface for several musical numbers. The film is now owned by Universal Studios, Inc., which does not make it available for purchase or streaming.

== Plot ==
Dan Emmett and Jean are seated beneath a spreading magnolia tree in the garden of her home while he sings "Sunday, Monday or Always". The house is seen on fire, and though Dan rushes off to the fire-house for assistance, it is burned down. Jean's angry father blames Dan for leaving his pipe in the hall, and forbids Dan from seeing his daughter again. Dan says that he wants to marry Jean after he has become successful as an actor and composer, but Mason is so sure that Dan will fail he says that he will agree to the marriage if Dan returns successful within six months.

Dan leaves for New Orleans, and on the river boat sings "Swing Low, Sweet Chariot". He encounters another entertainer, Mr. Bones, who cheats him at cards and wins his 500 dollars. It is not until after Bones has left the boat that Dan discovers the cards are faked, but he meets him again in New Orleans and demands the return of his money. Bones denies cheating, but offers to put Dan in his act. Unable to pay for a meal they have in a restaurant, they are assaulted, and suffer black eyes.

Bones takes Dan to the boarding house owned by Mr. Cook and his daughter Millie. Neither Bones nor two other boarders can pay the rent arrears demanded by Millie, and she refuses to let Dan stay, until Mr. Cook intervenes to tell Bones that the manager of the local Maxwell Theatre has said Bones could try out his act that evening.

The other two boarders sing "Laughing Tony" to Bones, but he refuses to let them join his act. Dan reminds Bones of his promise that he should be in the act, but Bones insists that his act is a single, until Millie threatens to lock him in his room unless all four appear. She suggests that to cover their battered features they should use black make-up.

On stage, the four sing "Old Dan Tucker" and "The Last Rose of Summer", introduce minstrel-style patter, and Dan sings "She's From Missouri". They are successful, and Millie becomes attracted to Dan who, however, tells her about Jean. The act continues to do well and is enlarged to a twenty-four artist minstrel show, with Mr. Cook joining as the only white-faced member.

Although Dan is also attracted to Millie, he tells her he will remain loyal to Jean and Millie, in a fit of pique, agrees to marry Bones. The new minstrel show opens: the Company sings "Minstrel Show" and "Buffalo Gals", while Dan sings "A Horse That Knows the Way Back Home". At a celebration supper, Dan and Millie make up their quarrel, but the sound of fire bells and a burning theatre, caused by Dan's pipe, puts them all out of a job.

Dan returns to his home-town to find that Jean has been stricken with paralysis and will never walk again. He insists on going through with the marriage, and they travel to New York City. In New Orleans, Bones again asks Millie to marry him, and they learn that the theatre will be repaired in three weeks' time. When Dan sings his new song, "If You Please", to Jean, she suggests that he tries to sell his songs, but a publisher refuses "Dixie" when Dan sings it for him. He manages, however, to sell ten other songs for 100 dollars, but refuses to part with "Dixie" when he is offered only one dollar for it.

Mr. Cook arrives and tells Jean of Dan's success in New Orleans, inadvertently revealing the situation between Millie and Dan. Cook urges Dan to return to New Orleans and join a new show of forty artists; when Jean supports this plea, Dan agrees. On their arrival in New Orleans, Millie is still angry with Dan, but realises the true situation when she sees that Jean is an invalid.

The new Minstrel Show is booked into the Opera House for three months, but when "Dixie" is sung by one of the minstrels, it is not well received. Jean suggests that it should be played at a quicker tempo, but Dan disagrees. Jean, under the impression that Dan is in love with Millie, tells her servant, Lucius, to place a letter of farewell in Dan's dressing room. The show proceeds, and Dan sings "Sunday, Monday or Always" with the company. While the minstrels sing "She's From Missouri", Millie, backstage, tells Bones that she will marry him that night and breaks the news to Jean.

On stage, Dan and the company sing "Dixie" while his pipe, once again left lying around, starts a fire. As the tempo of the song speeds up, the entire audience joins in the rousing chorus. The fire burns Dan's dressing room and Jean's valedictory letter.

== Cast ==
- Bing Crosby as Daniel Decatur Emmett
- Dorothy Lamour as Millie Cook
- Billy De Wolfe as Mr. Bones
- Marjorie Reynolds as Jean Mason
- Lynne Overman as Mr. Whitlock
- Eddie Foy, Jr. as Mr. Felham
- Raymond Walburn as Mr. Cook
- Grant Mitchell as Mr. Mason
- Clara Blandick as Mrs. Mason
- Tom Herbert as Homer
- Olin Howland as Mr. Deveraux (as Olin Howlin)
- Robert Warwick as Mr. LaPlant
- Stanley Andrews as Mr. Masters
- Norma Varden as Mrs. La Plant
- James Burke as Riverboat captain
- George H. Reed as Lucius
- Harry Barris as Drummer
- Jimmy Conlin as Publisher
- George Anderson as Publisher
- Harry C. Bradley as Publisher
- Dell Henderson as Stage manager
- Willie Best as Steward
- Tom Kennedy as Barkeeper
- Carl Switzer as Boy

== Reception ==
The film was placed at No. 10 in the list of top-grossing movies for 1943 in the US, but nevertheless, it got a mixed reception. Variety said: "Dixie is a Technicolorful money-getter, ideal for the summer b.o. It has charm, lightness, good new songs by Johnny Burke and Jimmy Van Heusen, the classic oldies by Dan Emmett ('Dixie'), and some spirituals such as 'Swing Low Sweet Chariot.' And it has Bing Crosby and Dorothy Lamour for the marquee...The new songs are clicko. 'Sunday, Monday and Always' and 'She's From Missouri' are Hit Parade material, and the Negro spiritual on the riverboat was effectively introduced by Crosby... Per usual, Crosby is in high with his vocalizing. Whether it's 'Dixie' or the new Tin Pan Alley interpolations, the crooner is never from Dixie when it comes to lyric interpretations. The weaker the film vehicles, the greater is the impact of the Crosby technique. . . .Crosby now is as standard among the male singing toppers as the Four Freedoms, and today he shapes up more and more as the Will Rogers-type of solid American actor-citizen. He enjoys a stature, especially because of his radio programs, enjoyed by no other singing star in show business..."

Bosley Crowther, writing in The New York Times was not impressed, saying, inter alia: "Gentlemen (and ladies), be seated—at the Paramount Theatre that is to say—if you are interested in some old-time minstrel capers tossed off in a Technicolor film. For songs and jigs and funny sayings are what Paramount is delivering about 40 per cent of the time in a ruffled and reminiscent picture entitled 'Dixie' which came to that theatre yesterday. Otherwise, the remainder of the picture is mainly and not so spiritedly absorbed in a largely fictitious story of Dan Emmett, the original 'Virginia Minstrels' man and the author of the rousing song "Dixie"— a role which the old booper, Bing Crosby, plays... And when Bashful Bing is warbling such sparkless but adequate songs as "Sunday, Monday or Always", "She's from Missouri" or "A Horse That Knows the Way Back Home", it is easy to sit back and listen. There is also a dash of liveliness in the wholly apocryphal climax which pretends to show how "Dixie" was born. But when the story goes weakly meandering into a pointless, confused romance between Dan and a New Orleans hoyden, played airily by Dorothy Lamour, and then marries him off to an old sweetheart who is crippled (Marjorie Reynolds), it is labored and dull... Mr. De Wolfe, with some coaching, might do in an amateur show, but he is definitely a minus quantity in a spot generally filled by Bob Hope. Indeed, the fact is that none of the picture has the jubilatory spirit and dash that should go with an old-time minstrel story. There's a great movie in that subject yet. And Paramount had a nerve to make a picture in which Bing — and he alone — has one hit song."

== Soundtrack ==
- "Sunday, Monday, or Always" sung by Bing Crosby
- "Swing Low, Sweet Chariot" sung by Bing Crosby
- "Laughing Tony" (Jimmy Van Heusen / Johnny Burke) sung by Eddie Foy, Jr. and Lynne Overman
- "Old Dan Tucker" sung by Bing Crosby, Billy De Wolfe, Eddie Foy, Jr. and Lynne Overman
- "The Last Rose of Summer" sung by Bing Crosby, Billy De Wolfe, Eddie Foy, Jr. and Lynne Overman
- "She's from Missouri" (Jimmy Van Heusen / Johnny Burke) sung by Bing Crosby and again by chorus
- "Minstrel Show" sung by chorus
- "Buffalo Gals" sung by chorus
- "A Horse That Knows the Way Back Home" (Jimmy Van Heusen / Johnny Burke) sung by Bing Crosby
- "If You Please" (Jimmy Van Heusen / Johnny Burke) sung by Bing Crosby
- "Dixie" sung by Bing Crosby and again by chorus

Two other songs, "Kinda Peculiar Brown" and "Miss Jemima Walks By", were written for the film by Burke and Van Heusen, but not used.

Bing Crosby recorded two of the songs for Decca Records. "Sunday, Monday, or Always" topped the Billboard charts for seven weeks, and "If You Please" also charted, with a peak position of no. 5 in a 12-week stay. Crosby's songs were also included in the Bing's Hollywood series.
