= 1943 in British television =

This is a list of British television-related events from 1943.

== Events ==
British television did not broadcast in 1943. Television had been suspended since 1939 for the duration of the Second World War, due to fears that the signals would help German bombers. Television broadcasting resumed in 1946.

== Births ==
- 9 January – Freddie Starr, English comedian and singer (died 2019)
- 29 January – Tony Blackburn, English radio disc jockey
- 2 February – Susan Hanson, English actress
- 18 February – Graeme Garden, Scottish writer, comedian and actor
- 5 March
  - Jane Rossington, English actress
  - Hugh Scully, English television presenter (died 2015)
- 8 March
  - Michael Grade, television executive and businessman
  - Lynn Redgrave, English actress (died 2010)
- 16 March – John Leeson, British actor
- 21 March – Vivian Stanshall, English comedian, writer, artist, broadcaster and musician (died 1995)
- 29 March – Eric Idle, English actor, writer and composer
- 3 April – Peter Benson, actor (died 2018)
- 5 May – Michael Palin, British comedian
- 6 May
  - Grange Calveley, animator and screenwriter (died 2021)
  - Roger Cook, Australasian-born investigative reporter (died 2026)
- 27 May – Cilla Black, Liverpudlian singer-songwriter and television personality (died 2015)
- 8 June – Colin Baker, British actor
- 13 June – Malcolm McDowell, actor
- 29 June – Maureen O'Brien, British actress
- 20 July – Wendy Richard, British actress (died 2009)
- 20 August – Sylvester McCoy, British actor
- 5 September – Richard Dunn, CEO of Thames Television (died 1998)
- 23 September – Tony Gubba, English sports commentator (died 2013)
- 30 September – Ian Ogilvy, English actor
- 2 October – Anna Ford, journalist, newsreader and television presenter
- 11 October – John Nettles, actor
- 18 October – Dai Jones, Welsh broadcaster (died 2022)
- 23 November – Sue Nicholls, actress
- 28 November – Susan Brookes, television chef
- 7 December – Sue Johnston, actor
- 19 December – Sam Kelly, actor (died 2014)
- 20 December – Jacqueline Pearce, actress (died 2018)
- 28 December – Richard Whiteley, English television presenter (died 2005)

== See also ==
- 1943 in British music
- 1943 in the United Kingdom
- List of British films of 1943
