= 1943 in the United Kingdom =

Events from the year 1943 in the United Kingdom. The year was dominated by the Second World War.

== Incumbents ==
- Monarch – George VI
- Prime Minister – Winston Churchill (Coalition)

== Events ==
- 1 January
  - Total ban on civilians travelling to the Isle of Wight (continues until 25 August 1944).
  - Utility furniture first becomes available.
- 14 January – to counter a "serious increase" in U-boat operations the Royal Air Force switches its bombing campaign from industrial targets to U-boat bases in France attacking Lorient and Cherbourg-Octeville.
- 17 January – anti-aircraft shrapnel shells kill 23 people and injure 60 during a raid on London by 118 planes; six are reported losses.
- 20 January – Sandhurst Road School Disaster: a bomb kills 38 children and 6 teachers at a school in Catford, south-east London.
- 23 January – World War II: British forces capture Tripoli from the Nazis.
- 11 February – in the Midlothian and Peebles Northern by-election, the radical socialist Common Wealth Party candidate Tom Wintringham comes close to winning the seat.
- 13 February – Nuffield Foundation established by William Morris, 1st Viscount Nuffield.
- 3 March – panic at the sound of new anti-aircraft rockets leads to a crush at Bethnal Green tube station in East London, killing 183 people.
- 4–12 March – "Exercise Spartan", a major rehearsal for next year's Allied Invasion of Normandy, is staged across southern England.
- 5 March – the Gloster Meteor, the first operational military jet aircraft for the Allies, has its first test flight, at RAF Cranwell in Lincolnshire.
- 14 March – submarine HMS Thunderbolt is sunk off Sicily by an Italian corvette, the second time this vessel has been lost with all hands.
- 17 March – last church service in the village of Derwent, Derbyshire, before it is demolished (together with Ashopton) for construction of Ladybower Reservoir.
- 27 March – Royal Navy escort carrier HMS Dasher (D37) is destroyed by an accidental explosion in the Firth of Clyde, killing 379 of the crew of 528.
- 13 April – release of the Ministry of Information film Desert Victory, which will win this year's Academy Award for Best Documentary Feature.
- 21 April – worst bombing of Aberdeen. 130 bombs killed 93 civilians and 27 soldiers.
- 7 May – capture of Tunis ends the campaign in North Africa.
- 16–17 May – Operation Chastise (the 'Dambuster Raid') takes place: No. 617 Squadron RAF use bouncing bombs to breach German dams in the Ruhr Valley.
- 19 May – Winston Churchill addresses a joint session of the United States Congress.
- 1 June – BOAC Flight 777, a DC-3 on a scheduled passenger flight, is shot down over the Bay of Biscay by eight German Junkers Ju 88s; all 17 persons aboard perish, including the actor Leslie Howard.
- 24/25 June – Battle of Bamber Bridge: trouble flares between black American soldiers and white military police stationed in the Lancashire town; one black soldier is killed.
- 9 July–17 August – World War II: Allied invasion of Sicily.
- 5 August – North of Scotland Hydro-Electric Board established by Act of Parliament.
- 3–16 September – World War II: Allied invasion of Italy: Allied forces under General Sir Bernard Montgomery land in mainland Italy. On 16 September, the Salerno Mutiny occurs when soldiers of the British Army's X Corps refuse postings to new units.
- 15 September – first examples of standard cottages for farmworkers are completed, at Hildenborough, Kent.
- 26 September – trouble flares between black American soldiers and white military police stationed in Launceston, Cornwall; shots are fired.
- 11 November
  - Regency Act is passed allowing Counsellors of State absent during the Sovereign's absence not to be listed among the appointments; and that the heir-apparent or presumptive to the Throne need only to be eighteen to be a Counsellor.
  - Total evacuation of an area near Portmahomack in Scotland begins, to make way for rehearsal of the Normandy Landings.
- 16 November – total evacuation of the village of Imber on Salisbury Plain concludes, to make way for U.S. troop training; total evacuation of part of the South Hams of Devon begins, to make way for rehearsal of the Normandy Landings.
- 22–26 November – Cairo Conference ("Sextant"): Prime Minister of the United Kingdom Winston Churchill, President of the United States Franklin D. Roosevelt and Chairman of the National Government of China Chiang Kai-shek meet at Cairo in Egypt to discuss ways to defeat Japan in the Pacific War.
- 26 November – World War II: British troopship HMT Rohna is sunk off the north African coast by a Luftwaffe Henschel Hs 293 radio controlled glide bomb killing 1015.
- 2 December
  - First "Bevin Boys" selected from conscripts to work in the coal mines.
  - Pigeons White Vision, Winkie and Tyke become the first recipients of the Dickin Medal, instituted to honour the work of animals in war.
- 26 December – World War II: Battle of the North Cape – German battleship Scharnhorst is torpedoed and sunk in a night action north of the Arctic Circle by Royal Navy battleship HMS Duke of York and her escorts with the loss of all but 36 of the German crew of 1,943;
- December – construction of prototype Mark I Colossus computer, the world's first totally electronic programmable computing device, at the Post Office Research Station, Dollis Hill, to assist in cryptanalysis at Bletchley Park, is completed.
- Undated – Anne Loughlin becomes the first trades unionist appointed DBE and the first female President of the Trades Union Congress.

== Publications ==
- Nigel Balchin's novel The Small Back Room.
- T. S. Eliot's poetry Four Quartets.
- David Lack's study The Life of the Robin.
- C. S. Lewis' novel Perelandra.
- Nikolaus Pevsner's book An Outline of European Architecture.
- Malcolm Saville's children's novel Mystery at Witchend, first in The Lone Pine series.

== Births ==
=== January – March ===
- 6 January – Terry Venables, English football manager (died 2023)
- 7 January – Richard Armstrong, English conductor
- 9 January – Freddie Starr, English comedian and singer (died 2019)
- 10 January – Christopher Wicking, English screenwriter (died 2008)
- 13 January – Lorna Sage, academic (died 2001)
- 15 January – Margaret Beckett, politician
- 16 January
  - Michael Attwell, English actor (died 2006)
  - Gavin Bryars, composer and double bassist
  - Brian Ferneyhough, English-born composer
- 17 January – Malcolm Clarke, British composer (died 2003)
- 18 January – Prunella Ransome, English actress (died 2002)
- 20 January – Mel Hague, English singer and author (died 2023)
- 29 January – Tony Blackburn, English radio disc jockey
- 3 February – Eric Haydock, pop guitarist (died 2019)
- 9 February – Ryland Davies, Welsh opera singer (died 2023)
- 15 February – Lal Waterson, English folk singer-songwriter (died 1998)
- 16 February – Anthony Dowell, ballet dancer and artistic director of the Royal Ballet
- 18 February – Graeme Garden, Scottish writer, comedian, and actor
- 19 February – Tim Hunt, British biochemist, recipient of the Nobel Prize in Physiology or Medicine
- 20 February – Mike Leigh, British film director
- 25 February – George Harrison, English musician (The Beatles) (died 2001)
- 26 February – Darcus Howe, Trinidadian-born civil rights activist (died 2017)
- 2 March – Tony Meehan, English pop drummer (The Shadows) (died 2005)
- 7 March – Chris White, musician (The Zombies)
- 8 March
  - Michael Grade, television executive and life peer
  - Lynn Redgrave, English actress (died 2010)
- 9 March – David Matthews, composer
- 15 March – Lynda La Plante, writer and actress
- 16 March
  - Roger Dean, English guitarist (died 2008)
  - John Leeson, English actor (died 2026)
- 17 March – Clare Venables, English theatre director (died 2003)
- 21 March – Vivian Stanshall, English comedy musician, writer, artist and broadcaster (died 1995)
- 22 March – Keith Relf, English blues rock vocalist and harmonica player (The Yardbirds) (died 1976)
- 23 March – Ken White, muralist and painter (died 2025)
- 24 March – John Timpson, businessman
- 28 March – Richard Eyre, theatre and opera director
- 29 March
  - Eric Idle, English comedy actor, writer and composer
  - John Major, British Conservative politician, Prime Minister of the United Kingdom, 1990–1997

=== April – June ===
- 2 April – Nicky James, British singer-songwriter (The Moody Blues) (died 2007)
- 3 April – Jonathan Lynn, English comedy screenwriter and actor
- 6 April – Max Clifford, publicist (died 2017)
- 8 April – James Herbert, horror writer (died 2013)
- 10 April – Margaret Pemberton, writer
- 16 April
  - Ruth Madoc, actress (died 2022)
  - Dave Peverett, English singer and musician (died 2000)
- 20 April – John Eliot Gardiner, English conductor
- 21 April – Alan Fersht, English chemist and academic
- 24 April – Hew Pike, general
- 25 April – Tony Christie, singer
- 28 April – Jeffrey Tate, orchestral conductor (died 2017 in Italy)
- 1 May – Ian Dunn, gay and paedophile rights activist, founder of the Scottish Minorities Group (died 1998)
- 5 May
  - Michael Palin, comedian
  - Kay Ullrich, politician (died 2021)
- 8 May – Pat Barker, writer and historian
- 9 May
  - Vince Cable, politician
  - Colin Pillinger, planetary scientist (died 2014)
- 10 May – Lady Lucinda Lambton, photographer and writer
- 12 May – Tom Sawyer, Baron Sawyer, academic and politician
- 13 May – Anthony Clarke, Baron Clarke of Stone-cum-Ebony, judge
- 14 May – Jack Bruce, musician and songwriter (died 2014)
- 22 May
  - Arlene Phillips, choreographer
  - Betty Williams, Northern Irish political activist, recipient of the Nobel Peace Prize (died 2020)
- 26 May
  - Ian Breakwell, artist (died 2005)
  - Carol Lee Scott, television actress and singer (died 2017)
- 27 May – Cilla Black, born Priscilla White, singer-songwriter and television personality (died 2015)
- 1 June – David Newbery, English economist and academic
- 8 June – Colin Baker, actor
- 12 June – Tim Razzall, Baron Razzall, lawyer and politician
- 13 June
  - Len Garrison, Jamaican-born activist and historian (died 2003)
  - Malcolm McDowell, actor
- 18 June
  - Barry Evans, actor (died 1997)
  - Willie Irvine, Norther Irish footballer (died 2025)
- 22 June – J. Michael Kosterlitz, Scottish-born condensed matter physicist, recipient of the Nobel Prize in Physics
- 29 June – Maureen O'Brien, actress

=== July – September ===
- 3 July – Gary Waldhorn, actor and comedian (died 2022)
- 7 July – Robert East, actor
- 10 July – Gavin Strang, politician
- 12 July
  - Christine McVie, pop rock singer-songwriter and keyboardist (Fleetwood Mac) (died 2022)
  - Ronnie Radford, footballer (died 2022)
- 15 July – Jocelyn Bell Burnell, astronomer
- 20 July
  - John Lodge, rock musician (died 2025)
  - Wendy Richard, actress (died 2009)
- 25 July – Jim McCarty, drummer
- 26 July
  - Andrew Crozier, poet (died 2008)
  - Mick Jagger, English rock singer (Rolling Stones)
- 28 July – Richard Wright, English progressive rock keyboardist (Pink Floyd) (died 2008)
- 31 July – John Dyson, Master of the Rolls
- 2 August
  - Julia Foster, actress
  - Rose Tremain, fiction writer
- 11 August – Denis Payton, saxophonist (died 2006)
- 15 August – Malcolm Gregson, golfer (died 2024)
- 17 August – John Humphrys, broadcaster
- 19 August – Billy J. Kramer, né William H. Ashton, pop singer
- 20 August – Sylvester McCoy, né Percy Kent-Smith, Scottish actor
- 22 August – Alun Michael, politician
- 3 September – Andrew Jennings, investigative journalist (died 2022)
- 5 September – Richard Dunn, CEO of Thames Television (died 1998)
- 6 September
  - Richard J. Roberts, English biochemist and molecular biologist, recipient of the Nobel Prize in Physiology or Medicine
  - Roger Waters, English musician
- 27 September – Max Boyce, Welsh singer and entertainer
- 28 September – Mike Dickin, DJ and radio personality (died 2006)
- 30 September – Ian Ogilvy, English actor

=== October – December ===
- 2 October – Anna Ford, journalist and newsreader
- 5 October – Michael Morpurgo, writer
- 11 October – John Nettles, actor
- 21 October – Jason Hughes, sociologist
- 23 October – Anita Roddick, businesswoman (died 2007)
- 29 October – Norman Hunter, England footballer (died 2020)
- 31 October – Paul Frampton, English physicist
- 8 November – Martin Peters, England footballer (died 2019)
- 28 November – Susan Brookes, television chef
- 7 December – Sue Johnston, actress
- 9 December – Joanna Trollope, novelist (died 2025)
- 11 December – Betty Kershaw, nurse and academic
- 13 December – Marti Webb, singer and actress
- 14 December – Britt Allcroft, television producer (died 2024)
- 17 December – Ron Geesin, musician and songwriter (Pink Floyd)
- 18 December – Keith Richards, rock guitarist and songwriter (The Rolling Stones)
- 25 December – Eve Pollard, journalist and editor
- 27 December – Peter Sinfield, lyricist and producer (died 2024)
- 28 December
  - Keith Floyd, celebrity chef (died 2009)
  - Richard Whiteley, television presenter (died 2005)
- 31 December – Ben Kingsley, actor

== Deaths ==
=== January – June ===
- 3 January – F. M. Cornford, classicist and poet (born 1874)
- 7 January – Sir Henry Maybury, civil engineer (born 1864)
- 8 January – Albert Goldthorpe, rugby league footballer (born 1871)
- 9 January – R. G. Collingwood, philosopher and historian (born 1889)
- 19 January – William Pettigrew, Scottish-born Christian missionary to India (born 1869)
- 24 January – John Burns, trade union leader, politician and historian (born 1858)
- 27 January – Ben Tillett, trade union leader (born 1860)
- 2 February – Alfred Cavendish, general (born 1859)
- 7 February – Clara Novello Davies, Welsh-born singer (born 1861)
- 9 February – Sir Eustace Fiennes, soldier and politician (born 1864)
- 23 February – Edward Heaton-Ellis, naval officer (born 1868)
- 27 February – Dilly Knox, cryptanalyst (born 1884)
- 3 March – George Thompson, cricketer (born 1877)
- 10 March – Laurence Binyon, poet and scholar (born 1869)
- 14 March – Mervyn Herbert, Viscount Clive, British peer, army officer (killed on active service in aviation accident) (born 1904)
- 26 March – Leonard Darwin, soldier, politician, economist, eugenicist (born 1850)
- 28 March
  - Ben Davies, operatic tenor (born 1858)
  - Edward Heron-Allen, polymath, lawyer, scientist and scholar (born 1871)
  - Robert W. Paul, pioneer of cinematography (born 1869)
- 5 April – William George Howard Gritten, barrister, writer and Conservative politician (born 1870)
- 26 April – Alastair Windsor, 2nd Duke of Connaught and Strathearn, son of Prince and Princess Arthur of Connaught (born 1914)
- 29 April – Sidney Keyes, poet (killed in action) (born 1922)
- 30 April – Beatrice Webb, socialist, economist and reformer (born 1858)
- 5 May
  - Gordon Hewart, 1st Viscount Hewart, politician and judge (born 1870)
  - Henry B Wimbush, landscape painter, book illustrator and postcard artist (born 1858)
- 25 May – Percy Shakespeare, painter (killed on active service) (born 1906)
- 27 May – Arthur Mee, topographer and children's encyclopedist (born 1875)
- 17 May – Montagu Love, actor (born 1877)
- 1 June – Leslie Howard, actor (born 1893)
- 3 June – Osgood Hanbury, pilot (killed on active service) (born 1917)
- 17 June – Annie S. Swan, Scottish romantic fiction writer and political activist (born 1859)

=== July – December ===
- 12 August – Bobby Peel, English cricketer (born 1857)
- 24 August – Simone Weil, philosopher (born 1909 in France)
- 26 August – Ted Ray, golfer (born 1877)
- 27 August – William de Burgh, philosopher (born 1866)
- 6 September – Reginald McKenna, Home Secretary and Chancellor of the Exchequer (born 1863)
- 21 September – Sir Kingsley Wood, politician (born 1881)
- 23 September – Elinor Glyn, romantic fiction writer and screenwriter (born 1864 in Jersey)
- 7 October – Radclyffe Hall, author and poet (born 1880)
- 21 October – Sir Dudley Pound, admiral (born 1877)
- 22 October – Sir William Reginald Hall ("Blinker" Hall), admiral and cryptanalyst (born 1870)
- 28 October – Sir Aurel Stein, archaeologist (born 1862 in Hungary)
- 26 November – Prince Hubertus of Saxe-Coburg and Gotha, pilot, great-grandson of Queen Victoria (born 1909 in Germany)
- 6 December – G. O. Smith, amateur footballer and cricketer (born 1872)
- 8 December – Donald Mackintosh, Roman Catholic Archbishop of Glasgow (born 1876)
- 18 December – Hector Gray, RAF officer (executed in Japanese Prisoner of War camp) (born 1911)
- 22 December – Beatrix Potter, children's author, illustrator and conservationist (born 1866)
- 23 December – Sir Frederic Fisher, admiral (born 1851)

== See also ==
- List of British films of 1943
- Military history of the United Kingdom during World War II
