= The Man with a Cross =

- Directed by: Roberto Rossellini
- Written by: Asvero Gravelli; Alberto Consiglio; Giovanni D'Alicandro; Roberto Rossellini
- Starring: Alberto Tavazzi; Roswita Schmidt; Attilio Dottesio; Doris Hild
- Cinematography: Guglielmo Lombardi
- Edited by: Eraldo Da Roma
- Music by: Renzo Rossellini
- Production company: Continentalcine
- Distributed by: ENIC
- Release date: 3 February 1943
- Running time: 72 minutes
- Country: Italy
- Language: Italian

The Man with a Cross (Italian: L'uomo dalla croce) is a 1943 Italian war film directed by Roberto Rossellini and starring Alberto Tavazzi, Roswita Schmidt and Attilio Dottesio. It was the final part of Rossellini's "Fascist trilogy" following The White Ship (1941) and A Pilot Returns (1942). It is loosely inspired by Reginaldo Giuliani, an Italian military chaplain who had been killed on active service.

The film was made at Cinecittà with location shooting in the countryside around Ladispoli standing in for the Eastern Front. Although the film incorporates elements of neorealism such as the use of amateur actors in some parts, stylistically it is closer to a more conventional war film. Rossellini cast his friend, the art director Alberto Tavazzi in the title role, while his girlfriend Roswita Schmidt played the female lead.

== Synopsis ==
The film is set in the summer of 1942 in Ukraine where Italian troops are fighting those of the Soviet Union. A military chaplain volunteers to stay behind with a badly wounded Italian soldier, even though this means certain capture.

== Cast ==
- Alberto Tavazzi as Il cappellano militare
- Roswita Schmidt as Irina, la miliziana
- Attilio Dottesio as Il carrista ferito
- Doris Hild as Una contadina russa
- Zoia Weneda as Un'altra contadina russa
- Antonio Marietti as Serghej, il commissario del popolo
- Piero Pastore as Beyrov
- Aldo Capacci as Lo studente soldato
- Franco Castellani as Un soldato russo ferito
- Gualtiero Isnenghi as Il ferito antibolscevico
- Antonio Suriano as Il soldato napoletano
- Marcello Tanzi as Diego

== Bibliography ==
- Bondanella, Peter. A History of Italian Cinema. Continuum, 2009.
- Bondanella, Peter. The Films of Roberto Rossellini. Cambridge University Press, 1993.
