= The Story of a Flemish Farm =

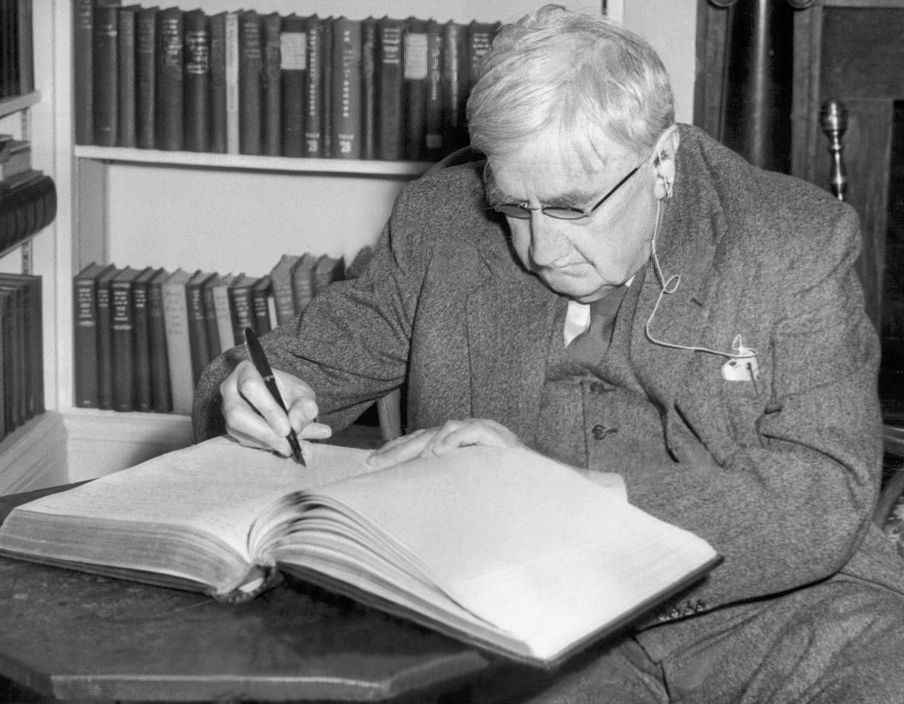
Ralph Vaughan Williams signing the guest book at Yale University in 1954

The Story of a Flemish Farm is an orchestral suite by British composer Ralph Vaughan Williams, based on the score for the 1943 film The Flemish Farm, a wartime drama set in occupied Europe, and written when Vaughan Williams was 70.

Vaughan Williams conducted the suite himself at a Promenade concert in July 1945, though he remarked that to call anything a suite was 'to damn it to extinction'. Christopher Thomas, writing in a record review, commented: "The bold strength of the melodic writing is highly idiomatic and reflects VW at the height of his creative powers shortly before the works that were to form the symphonic "Indian Summer" of his later years."

The film score was recorded by the London Symphony Orchestra, conducted by Muir Mathieson and the suite has also been recorded by the RTÉ Concert Orchestra under Andrew Penny, and by the BBC Philharmonic under Rumon Gamba.

== Music ==
The score comprises seven movements, which follow the flow of the story:

1. The Flag Flutters in the Wind
2. Night by the Sea, Farewell to the Flag
3. Dawn in the Old Barn, The Parting of the Lovers
4. In the Café
5. The Major Goes to Face His Fate
6. The Dead Man's Kit
7. The Wanderings of the Flag

The music takes themes from a number of folk tunes, along with references to A Sea Symphony of 1909 and his 6th Symphony, which followed in 1947.
