= Henry B. Wimbush =

English painter

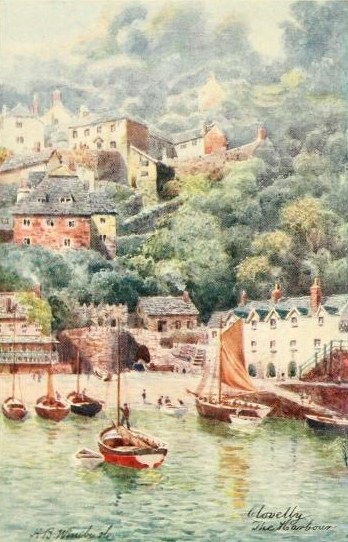
Clovelly, the harbour (watercolour, 1906)

Henry Bowser Wimbush (11 March 1858 – 5 May 1943) was an English landscape painter, book illustrator and postcard artist.

Born in London, England, Wimbush first exhibited at the Royal Academy in 1888 and went on to mount several other exhibitions there over the years. He also exhibited at the Royal Institute of Painters in Water Colours and Royal Society of British Artists in London, and in other cities in England.

Working initially in oils, he made the switch to watercolours, painting throughout England, Scotland, Wales and the Channel Islands. He provided illustrations for several books published by A & C Black. He was the leading artist for the postcard company Raphael Tuck & Sons.

In 1880 Wimbush married Margaret Sillar – they went on to have 11 children. After her death in 1927, he married Emily Dremel and lived in Taunton, Somerset where he died in 1943.

Two of his daughters were also artists – Winifred (1884–1958), and Olive (1901–1985).

== Illustrated books ==
- Carey, Edith F. The Channel Islands (A & C Black, 1904).
- Snell, F. J. North Devon (A & C Black, 1906).
- Morris, J. E. The Channel Islands (A & C Black, 1911).
- Wimbush, H. B. Channel Islands water-colours (A & C Black, 1919).

== External links (and references) ==
- H B Wimbush
- Henry B Wimbush (Biog at goantiques.com).
