= Bombing of Sandhurst Road School =

Air raid in London, England

Coordinates: 51.4428°N 0.0004°W

The bombing of Sandhurst Road School occurred during an air raid on Wednesday, 20 January 1943 when the school on Ardgowan Road, Catford, south east London was seriously damaged. An axis fighter-bomber dropped a 500-kilogram (1,100 lb) bomb on the school at 12:30 p.m., killing 38 children (32 killed at the school and 6 more died in hospital) and 6 staff and injuring another 60 people. Many were buried for hours under the rubble.

== The attack ==
The axis attack was part of a raid by 28 Focke-Wulf Fw 190A-4U3 fighter-bombers escorted by Messerschmitt Bf 109 fighters, which took off at noon from an airfield in German-occupied France. The planes were to attack targets of opportunity in what the Germans called a Terrorangriff ("terror raid"). The German pilot who attacked the school was Hauptmann Heinz Schumann (born 29 November 1914, killed in action 8 November 1943) from Jagdgeschwader 2. He was flying a Focke-Wulf Fw 190A-4 carrying a 500 kg (1,100 lb) SC500 bomb. It is debated whether Schumann deliberately targeted the school, or simply attacked what looked like a large factory (the school was several stories high). The report mentions that a large building was targeted and destroyed in the raid and noted it as a block of flats. Goss also says that the RAF had bombed Berlin three days before this terror-raid which was a retaliation raid demanded by Hitler.

Due to inefficiencies of the warning system, the air raid siren had not sounded by the time the German planes arrived. Many children were having their lunch and the attack destroyed the area of the school where they were eating. Witness reports suggest the attacking planes first flew past the school and then bombed it on a second run. Another plane is alleged to have also strafed the playground and local streets. In the same raid four barrage balloon sites were destroyed in Lewisham, a large gas holder in Sydenham was set alight, a Deptford power station suffered three direct hits, and the President's House at the Royal Naval College, Greenwich sustained damage.

== Deaths and memorials ==
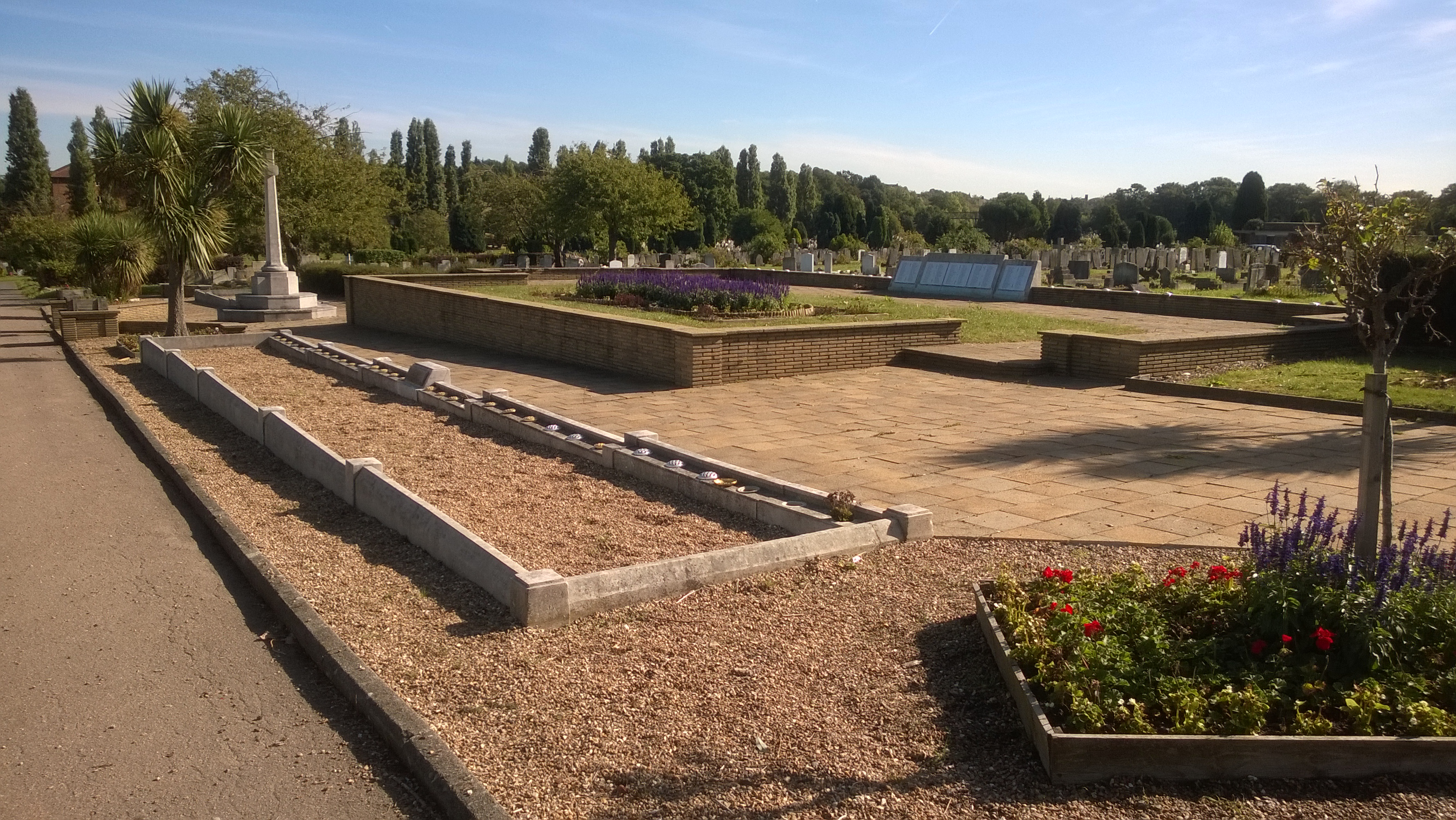
Memorials to the victims of the Second World War and of the bombing of Sandhurst Road School, Catford.

The bomb killed (either immediately or later in hospital) twenty-four pupils and two teachers in the dining room. Five more children were killed on a staircase and nine in second floor classrooms. The blast also destroyed the staff room killing three teachers and another was killed in a science room. Roughly sixty others were injured. The teachers who died were Mrs Connie Taylor, Mrs Ethel Betts, Mrs Virginia Carr, Miss Mary Jukes, Miss Gladys Knowelden and Miss Harriet Langdon.

Of the thirty-eight children and six teachers killed by the bombing, thirty-one children and one teacher were buried together at Hither Green Cemetery in a civilian war dead plot. The mass grave has a rectangular stone surround that contains a raised tablet with inscription. The burial was conducted by the Bishop of Southwark Bertram Simpson, and over 7,000 mourners attended. The school, now called Sandhurst Primary School, has a stained glass window and a memorial garden commemorating the event.

== Aftermath ==
Shortly after the raid, an inquiry into the events surrounding the attack and the responses of the emergency services was held at Lewisham Town Hall. It was noted that local Civil Defence services arrived at the school quickly and special thanks were made to volunteers, the Heavy Rescue Squads, REME soldiers billeted at St Dunstan's College and Canadian forces from Bromley Wood. Some issues were raised about how the police were unable to control parents at the school digging for their children, but given the nature of the incident this was noted to have been virtually impossible to stop.

== See also ==
- Hither Green Cemetery
