= Alberto Tavazzi =

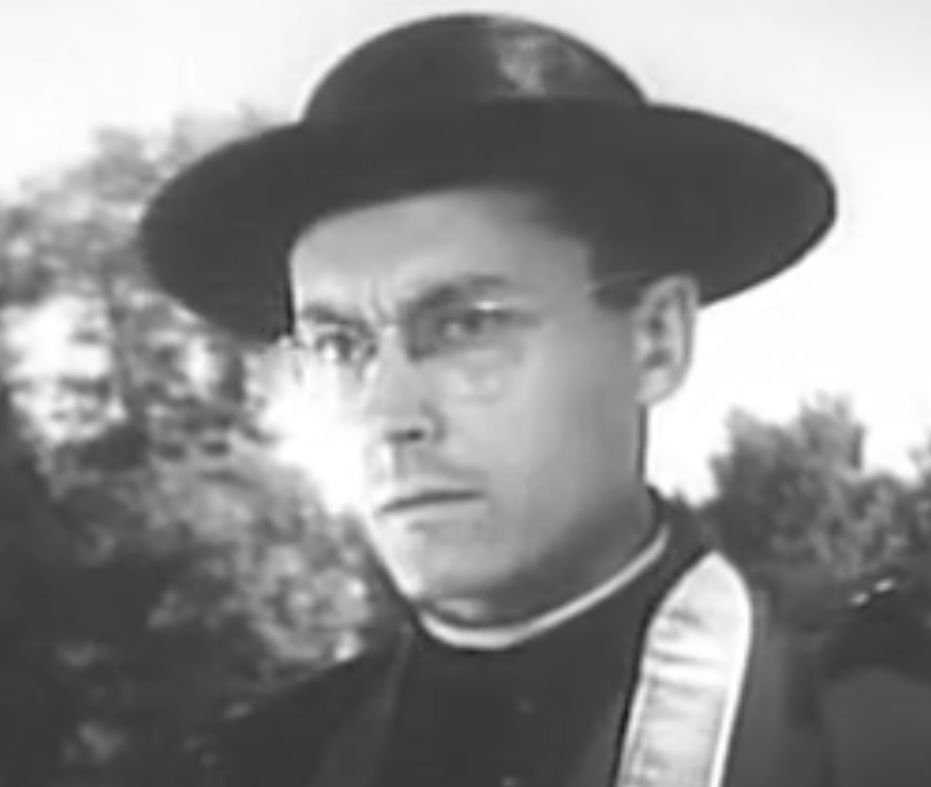
- Tavazzi in Rome, Open City (1945)
- Born: 25 March 1912; Rome, Lazio; Kingdom of Italy
- Died: 22 April 2006 (aged 94); Rome, Lazio; Italy
- Occupations: Art director Actor
- Years active: 1939–1966 (film)

Alberto Tavazzi (1912–2006) was an Italian painter, art director and occasional actor.

From 1939 Tavazzi began working on the design and construction of film sets. He was a friend of the director Roberto Rossellini, who cast him in the title role as a Catholic Priest in his 1943 war film The Man with a Cross. Tavazzi played a priest again in Rossellini's 1945 neorealist drama Rome, Open City.

== Selected filmography ==
=== Art director ===
- Equator (1939)
- Toto and the King of Rome (1951)

=== Actor ===
- The Man with a Cross (1943)
- Rome, Open City (1945)
- No Turning Back (1945)

== Bibliography ==
- Bondanella, Peter. The Films of Roberto Rossellini. Cambridge University Press, 1993.
