= Squadron Leader X =

1943 British film, now lost

- U.S. promotional poster
- Directed by: Lance Comfort
- Written by: Miles Malleson; Wolfgang Wilhelm; Emeric Pressburger
- Based on: story "Four Days in a Hero's Life" by Emeric Pressburger
- Produced by: Victor Hanbury
- Starring: Eric Portman; Ann Dvorak
- Cinematography: Mutz Greenbaum
- Edited by: Michael C. Chorlton
- Music by: William Alwyn (composer); Muir Mathieson (conductor)
- Production company: Victor Hanbury Productions (for) RKO Radio British Productions
- Distributed by: RKO Radio British Productions
- Release date: 1 March 1943 (U.K.)
- Running time: 99 minutes
- Country: United Kingdom
- Language: English

Squadron Leader X is a 1943 British World War II spy drama directed by Lance Comfort and starring Eric Portman and Ann Dvorak. The screenplay by Miles Malleson and Wolfgang Wilhelm, adapted from a short story by Emeric Pressburger. The BFI National Archive considers the film "missing, believed lost". The archive contains script and stills, but no film or video materials.

== Plot ==
Erich Kohler, a crack Luftwaffe pilot who speaks fluent English, is ordered by his superior, Inspector Siegel, to drop a "stick" of bombs on the Belgian city of Ghent. He is further instructed to bail out of his aircraft wearing a British RAF uniform, gain the confidence of the local populace and then try to convince them that the British are responsible for the bombing of civilian targets in Belgium.

Despite being able to have a convincing English accent, and equipped with a photograph of his "wife" and a packet of Players cigarettes, the plan goes awry when Kohler falls into the hands of the Belgian Resistance. The resistance members believe they are doing him a favour by arranging for him to be smuggled to Britain among a group of downed RAF bomber crew who are being returned that night.

On arriving in Britain, Kohler escapes and makes his way to London where he tries to get in touch with old contacts, only to find that most have been interned on the Isle of Man. He does manage, however, to contact British nurse Barbara Lucas, an old flame who once had Nazi sympathies, but is not willing to help him. Kohler then takes refuge with the Krohns, a couple who are reluctant Nazi agents due to threats being made of harm to family members in Germany if they fail to co-operate.

Kohler finds himself being hunted both by the British MI5 and by German officials furious at his bungled mission in Belgium. Dr. Schultz, a ruthless Gestapo officer, confronts and accuses Kohler of inefficiency and cowardice. A shoot-out follows and Schultz is killed.

Meanwhile, MI5 agent Inspector Milne picks up Kohler's trail. Kohler manages narrowly to avoid arrest and steals a Supermarine Spitfire fighter aircraft in which to fly back to Germany. Over the English Channel, he is spotted by German fighters who believe they are engaging a British pilot, and shoot the aircraft down.

== Cast ==
- Eric Portman as Erich Kohler
- Ann Dvorak as Barbara Lucas
- Walter Fitzgerald as Inspector Milne
- Martin Miller as Mr. Krohn
- Beatrice Varley as Mrs. Krohn
- Henry Oscar as Dr. Schultz
- Barry Jones as Bruce Fenwick
- Charles Victor as Marks
- Marjorie Rhodes as Mrs. Agnew
- David Peel as Michael Bertholt
- Aubrey Mallalieu as Pierre
- Mary Merrall as Miss Thorndike
- Carl Jaffe as Luftwaffe Colonel
- Frederick Richter as Inspector Siegel

== Production ==
Squadron Leader X featured a Supermarine Spitfire fighter aircraft and a Klemm Kl 25 light aircraft. In a contemporary review, The Cinema declared: "The air-sequences, made with official Air Ministry co-operation, are among the most actionful and breath-taking ever screened".

== Reception ==
Picturegoer wrote: "One of the best spy melodramas yet made. In spite of its stretching of the long arm of coincidence and equally of the imagination it always succeeds in being convincing. ... Eric Portman is excellent as the airman who, in spite of his outward self-assurance, has a yellow streak. Ann Dvorak scores too, as the woman he blackmails into helping him. There are two outstanding character studies in a cast which has not a weak spot. They are given by Beatrice Varley and Martin Miller as two ex-Fascists who are browbeaten by a Nazi agent."

The Monthly Film Bulletin wrote: "An exciting story, well scripted and produced with tremendous attention to detail. The direction is admirable, the pace deftly adjusted and the photography and lighting noticeably good. Eric Portman's characterisation of Kohler is first-rate; he combines the reserve of the Englishman, the cruelty of the German bully and the latter's inherent cowardice quite brilliantly. He is supported by a cast that is of the highest order, especially Martin Miller as Krohn, Walter Fitzgerald as Inspector Milne and, in a small part, David Peel as Michel Berthelot. Ann Dvorak gives a very thoughtful interpretation of the part of Barbara Fenwick, and Barry Jones brings a natural charm to Dr. Fenwick that would have been an enormous comfort to his patients. The whole film is so convincingly made that it is only in retrospect that the constant presence of the long arm of coincidence is realised."

The Daily Film Renter wrote: "Brilliant casting, with star almost out-acted by superlative support. First-rate production. Clear-cut and original job, which holds a fascinating grip on the imagination from first to last, and an attraction which will do the box office proud. There's never a false note about this grippingly imaginative story."

Picture Show wrote: "Thrilling spy drama, well produced and directed and splendidly acted. Eric Portman is again seen in the role of a Nazi, and it is a genuine tribute to his acting that this genial, charming man in real life, can give such a realistic portrayal of the Nazi Mr. Churchill visualises when he is pronouncing the word. ... Ann Dvorak gives a grand portrayal of the unfortunate nurse, and splendid support is given by Beatrice Varley, Martin Miller, Barry Jones, Henry Oscar, and Walter Fitzgerald."

Variety wrote: "A very workmanlike job on which time and money must have been lavishly expended, intelligently cast, directed and photographed, but, before going into general release, should in many scenes be cut to render them more comprehensive to the average cinemagoer. When this is done the picture should be a good feature for the general run of American theatres. The bestial character of the Nazi i ace, wearing a British uniform, Is admirably portrayed by Eric Portman, The outstanding characterization is that of a Swiss cook who is blackmailed into assisting the Nazi espionage in England. Temperamentally his technique is more that of an Italian, but he, nevertheless, gives an especially moving performance, His name, Martin Miller, is unknown, but report has it he is an Austrian refugee. He gives promise as a character actor. Second only to Miller is Beatrice Varley as his wife."

Film historian Bertil Skogsberg in Wings on the Screen: A Pictorial History of Air Movies (1987) called some sequences "fairly exciting but otherwise (an) uninteresting thriller."

Aviation film historian James H. Farmer in Celluloid Wings: The Impact of Movies on Aviation (1984) had a similar appraisal, that, Squadron Leader X was "overlong".

== Preservation status ==
There is no record of Squadron Leader X ever being re-shown after its original release. The British Film Institute has been unable to trace a print for inclusion in the BFI National Archive, and currently classes the film as "missing, believed lost". Squadron Leader X is included on the BFI's "75 Most Wanted" list of missing British feature films. Film historians in the 21st century have also evinced a major increase in interest in Comfort's directorial career and Squadron Leader X is a vital missing piece of his filmography. (Note: Squadron Leader X is named the third "most wanted" of all, behind only The Mountain Eagle (Alfred Hitchcock) and Two Crowded Hours (Michael Powell).)

== See also ==
- List of lost films
