= Mike Dickin =

English radio presenter (1943–2006)

- Dickin
- Born: Robert Michael Dickin; 28 September 1943; Reading, Berkshire, England
- Died: 18 December 2006 (aged 63); Bodmin, Cornwall, England
- Children: 5
- Career
- Show: Talksport

Robert Michael Dickin (28 September 1943 – 18 December 2006), was an English radio presenter best known as the late-night host on the radio station talkSPORT.

== Early life ==
Dickin was born in 1943 in Reading, Berkshire.

== Career ==
Dickin started out as a musician in the 1960s: he was a bass player and singer, who discovered he preferred playing records to the business of making them, when he joined the BBC in 1970 as the first presenter on air at Radio Oxford.

Dickin liked motor racing. He was a stunt driver in the 1969 film The Italian Job. In 1977, he competed in the London–Sydney Marathon in a Mini 1275GT, co-driven by musician Simon Park. The same year, Dickin moved to Australia where he worked for Sydney's biggest radio station, 2UE. Upon returning to Britain in the late 1970s, he spent 17 years working for BBC Radio 4, LBC, and Capital Radio. He started at Talksport (then Talk Radio UK) in 1995.

Dickin used to present the 1 a.m. to 6 a.m. slot at weekends on Talk Radio from 1995 to 2001. He returned, filling in for James Whale during Whale's battle with kidney cancer. He was given the morning show slot soon afterwards, and then moved to the 10 p.m. to 1 a.m. show on weekends before his death.

Dickin was on air in the UK overnight when news was broken of the car crash that subsequently killed Diana, Princess of Wales, and he was still on air to make the announcement of her death as a newsflash.

He won a Golden Rose award for his coverage of the Lockerbie disaster in 1988.

Dickin was known for his strongly-held views. His passion led to him being labelled "Britain's angriest man" by talkSPORT listeners. Typical discussions on his show included crime, cars, trains, taxis, the problems of young people, the downfall of Britain, the incompetence of people in the service industry, speed cameras, parking tickets, and call centres. He was also known as "The King", for his supposed resemblance to Henry VIII, he would often use catchphrases, such as, "My health is not in question", when asked how he was, and "If you were constipated, you'd be speechless", and "You don't have two brain cells to rub together".

Some of his shows were broadcast from a studio in Bodmin, Cornwall, a few miles from his home. A staunch atheist, Dickin's last show was about the afterlife and the existence of God; famous atheist and author of The God Delusion, Richard Dawkins, was Dickin's guest on his last show.

Mike Dickin was killed in a car crash while driving on the A30 near his home in Cornwall, on 18 December 2006, at the age of 63. James Whale presented his tribute show. Dickin was married twice and is survived by his wife Karen and by his two sons and three daughters.
