= The Flemish Farm =

- Canadian 1-sheet poster
- Directed by: Jeffrey Dell
- Written by: Jeffrey Dell; Jill Craigie
- Produced by: Sydney Box
- Starring: Clive Brook; Clifford Evans; Jane Baxter
- Cinematography: Eric Cross
- Edited by: Compton Bennett
- Music by: Ralph Vaughan Williams
- Distributed by: Two Cities Films
- Release date: 6 September 1943
- Running time: 82 minutes
- Language: English

The Flemish Farm is a 1943 British war film, based on an actual wartime incident. Released during the war and used as a propaganda tool to support the Allied war effort, the film begins with the caption:

The following story is based on an actual incident, but for security reasons, real names have not been used. The co-operation of the Belgian Government and of the Air Ministry is gratefully acknowledged.

The score for the film was composed by Ralph Vaughan Williams in the summer of 1942, and the music was recorded by the London Symphony Orchestra conducted by Muir Mathieson. Vaughan Williams later made a suite in seven movements, entitled The Story of a Flemish Farm, from the music for the film.

== Premise ==
The film is based on an actual event. Following the Battle of Belgium in 1940, two Belgian Air Force officers, Colonel de Woelmont and Major Hellemans carried the regimental colour of the 2e Régiment d'Aéronautique as they made their escape through France, intending to reach the United Kingdom and continue the fight in the Royal Air Force. They buried the colour near the village of Vendargues near Montpellier in Southern France. In April 1941, Major Hellemans returned to France and assisted by Captain Vandermies, smuggled the colour back to Britain. On 12 February 1942, the colour was presented to No. 350 (Belgian) Squadron RAF, the first Free-Belgian fighter squadron, by Prince Bernhard.

== Plot ==
In May 1940, as German forces sweep across France and Belgium, the remains of the Belgian Air Force are bottled up near the Flemish coast and billeted at a farm in the Flemish countryside. Ordered by their government to surrender, the commander gives orders that the regimental colours be honourably buried, rather than surrendered to the invaders. The few pilots with serviceable aeroplanes fly to England to join the Allied air forces, while those remaining are forced to surrender.

Six months later, after fighting in the Battle of Britain, Jean Duclos, now a squadron leader, is persuaded by a fellow officer to return with him to retrieve the colours. The latter is killed before he can leave, and Duclos persuades the authorities to parachute him into Belgium. He contacts his former commanding officer, now living as a civilian in Ghent and secretly operating a resistance group feeding intelligence to the Allies. Provided with a false identity and a cover story, Duclos returns to the farm, where his late colleague's wife and child still live. She is initially unwilling to reveal where the colours are buried, believing that they are not worth dying for. But she relents and the colours are retrieved.

Duclos must now travel through several hundred miles of dangerous and heavily guarded country to reach neutral Spain, from where he returns to England. On his return, the colours are paraded and formally re-presented to the Belgian Air Force.

== Cast ==
- Clive Brook - Major Lessart
- Clifford Evans - Squadron Leader Jean Duclos
- Jane Baxter - Tresha
- Wylie Watson - Flemish farmer
- Philip Friend - Fernand Matagne
- Ronald Squire - Hardwicke
- Brefni O'Rorke - Minister
- Mary Jerrold - Mme Duclos
- Charles Compton - Ledoux
- Irene Handl - Frau

== Locations ==
One scene was filmed on Chelfham Viaduct, formerly of the Lynton and Barnstaple Railway in North Devon.
