= Francis in the Haunted House =

1956 film by Charles Lamont

- Theatrical release poster
- Directed by: Charles Lamont
- Written by: Herbert H. Margolis; William Raynor
- Produced by: Robert Arthur
- Starring: Mickey Rooney; Virginia Welles
- Cinematography: George Robinson
- Edited by: Milton Carruth
- Color process: Black and white
- Production company: Universal International Pictures
- Distributed by: Universal Pictures
- Release date: July 9, 1956
- Running time: 80 minutes
- Country: United States
- Language: English
- Box office: $1.2 million (US)

Francis in the Haunted House is a 1956 American comedy horror film from Universal-International, produced by Robert Arthur, directed by Charles Lamont, that stars Mickey Rooney and Virginia Welles.

This is the seventh and final film in the Universal-International Francis the Talking Mule series, notably without series director Arthur Lubin, star Donald O'Connor, or Francis' voice actor Chill Wills.

== Plot ==
Francis witnesses a murder and then befriends bumbling reporter David Prescott, who may be next in line. With Francis' help and guidance, Prescott uncovers a mystery involving murder, an inheritance, and a spooky old mansion on the edge of town.

Francis witnesses two men roll a boulder downhill and crush a speeding car, killing the driver. The killers throw rocks at him, arousing his public service instincts. He telephones Prescott, who is attending a party at City Hall and seems to be making progress courting heiress Lorna Mac Leod, owner of the castle. Prescott brings the police to the murder scene and the victim is one of the Mac Leod family lawyers. Prescott has so much "inside knowledge" of the crime that the police arrest him and demand that he "name his source", which is a bit difficult for him to do. Police take him back to the castle when they hear another of the family's lawyers has been either murdered or kidnapped from his locked room. Exploring the castle, Prescott was knocked out by a masked assailant and the "murder gun" placed in his hand. Back to the interrogation room.

To help Prescott, Francis decides to reveal himself to District Attorney Reynolds by saying, "You've been in politics for 20 years, what's so strange about a talking jackass?". He convinces the DA to release Prescott on bond. Prescott, to protect Lorna, insists on staying close to the action. The castle has numerous hidden underground passages that can be entered from the woods outside. One room contains paintings and statuary, which Francis deduces that somebody is replacing the castle's valuable artworks with forgeries and selling the originals.

Driving to tell the police about this development, Prescott is ambushed by Jason who is hiding in the back seat. Prescott manages to knock him out and tie him up. But during the few minutes Prescott is inside the police station, Jason is knifed to death. Back in the interrogation room, Prescott is subjected to hypnosis, lie detector tests, and truth serum. And still he insists there is such a thing as a talking mule.

The city's mayor is desperate to get things squared away and finally agrees to meet Francis. But all the time tramping around in the cold outdoors has given Francis laryngitis. Prescott mounts Francis and they escape through a hail of police bullets. They hide out in the district attorney's garage until Francis gets over his illness.

Prescott insists he must sneak back to the castle to protect Lorna and blunders into an underground dungeon that contains two "missing lawyers" and the genuine heiress. The family lawyers had to be "eliminated" one by one because they were the only ones who could have spotted the scam. The villains attempt to flood the dungeon but are foiled by Francis. A villain mounts a horse and charges with a lance but Francis talks the horse into throwing its crooked rider against a wall.

In the end, Prescott has won several rewards and the affections of the actual heiress.

== Cast ==
- Mickey Rooney as David Prescott
- Virginia Welles as Lorna MacLeod
- James Flavin as Police Chief Martin
- Paul Cavanagh as Neil Frazer
- Mary Ellen Kay as Lorna Ann
- David Janssen as Police Lieutenant Hopkins
- Ralph Dumke as Mayor Hargrove
- Richard Gaines as D.A. Reynolds
- Richard Deacon as Jason
- Dick Winslow as Sergeant Arnold
- Charles Horvath as Malcolm
- Timothy Carey as Hugo
- Helen Wallace as Mrs. MacPherson
- Edward Earle as Howard Grisby
- John Maxwell as Edward Ryan
- Glen Kramer as Ephraim Biddle
- Molly as Francis (as Francis the Talking Mule)
- Paul Frees as Francis (voice; uncredited)
- Olan Soule' as Doctor Bentley (uncredited)

== Production and reception ==
This seventh and final entry in the Francis the Talking Mule series was made without most of the key creative personnel from the earlier films. Leonard Maltin, in his Movie Guide, quotes Donald O'Connor on quitting the series: "When you've made six pictures and the mule still gets more fan mail than you do...". Director Lubin and Chill Wills were also absent, replaced respectively by Charles Lamont and voice actor Paul Frees, who did a close approximation of Wills' voice as Francis.

Mickey Rooney replaced Donald O'Connor as a new but similar character, David Prescott. According to his autobiography, Rooney was originally considered for a United Artists Francis feature film with his company Rooney Inc optioning and then turning down the property before Universal acquired the rights.

Rooney's casting was announced in January 1956.

Charles Lamont was announced as the film's director some weeks later.

Chill Wills, who voiced Francis in the six previous films asked for a salary increase which Universal was unwilling to pay, so the studio auditioned various voice actor replacements, including Mel Blanc, before settling on Paul Frees.

No explanation was given in the film as to why Francis left his original sidekick, Peter Stirling. In the script, Francis says he decided to befriend reporter Prescott because "I once lived on a farm owned by Prescott's uncle and wanted to protect his nephew out of respect for the deceased." With the more familiar aspects of the Francis series missing, the film, a standard tale of fake ghosts and gangsters, was poorly received; it was widely reviewed as the weakest entry in the series.

== Home media ==
The original film, Francis (1950), was released in 1978 as one of the first-ever titles in the new LaserDisc format, DiscoVision Catalog #22-003. It was then re-issued on LaserDisc in May 1994 by MCA/Universal Home Video (Catalog #: 42024) as part of an Encore Edition Double Feature with Francis Goes to the Races (1951).

The first two Francis films were released again in 2004 by Universal Pictures on Region 1 and Region 4 DVD, along with the next two in the series, as The Adventures of Francis the Talking Mule Vol. 1. Several years later, Universal released all 7 Francis films as a set on three Region 1 and Region 4 DVDs, Francis The Talking Mule: The Complete Collection.

== See also ==
- List of American films of 1956
