= The Trail of the Lonesome Pine (song) =

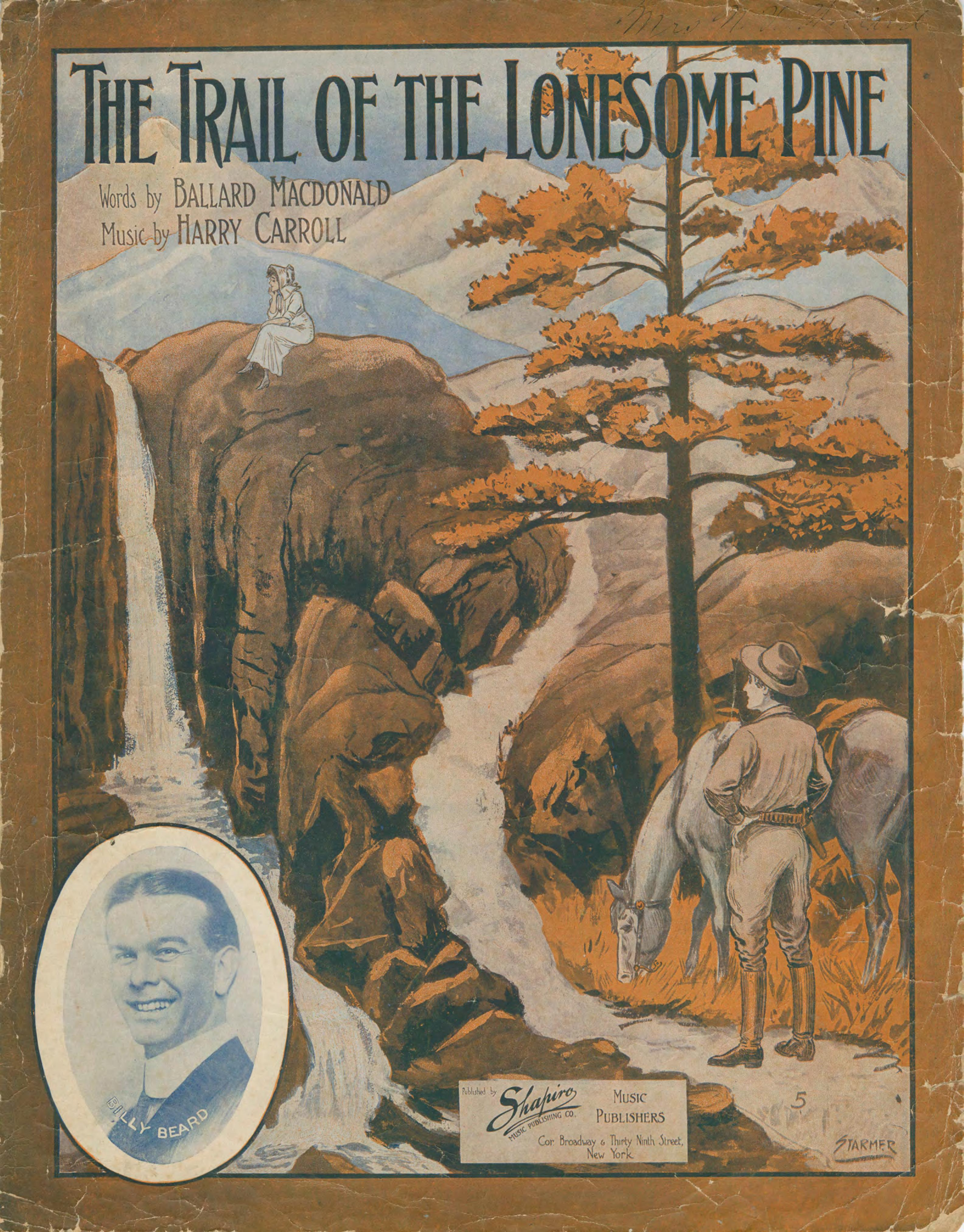
- Sheet music cover, 1913

Song
- Language: English
- Published: 1913
- Songwriters: Composer: Harry Carroll; Lyricist: Ballard MacDonald

Performance audio
- "The Trail Of The Lonesome Pine" (from Way Out West) (feat. Chill Wills) on YouTube

"The Trail of the Lonesome Pine" is a popular song published in 1913, with lyrics by Ballard MacDonald and music by Harry Carroll. It was inspired by John Fox Jr.'s 1908 novel of the same title, but whereas the novel was set in the Cumberland Mountains of Kentucky, the song refers to the Blue Ridge Mountains of Virginia. In it, the singer expresses his love for his girl, June, who is waiting for him under the titular pine tree. It was performed by Laurel and Hardy in the 1937 film Way Out West and this version became a UK Singles Chart hit in 1975, some years after both actors had died.

== History ==
It was recorded by Henry Burr and Albert Campbell on March 4, 1913, and was successful in America. Elsie Baker and James F. Harrison's version also sold well in the same year. The song is featured in the stage play The Trail Of The Lonesome Pine, and is played during the opening credits of the 1936 film adaptation.

The song was featured in Laurel and Hardy's 1937 film Way Out West. It was performed by Laurel and Hardy with The Avalon Boys and featured a section sung in deep bass by Chill Wills, lip-synced by Stan Laurel in the film, with the last two lines in soprano (sung by Rosina Lawrence) after Ollie hits Stan on the head with a mallet. This stage routine is performed by actors Steve Coogan and John C. Reilly as part of the 2019 biographical film Stan & Ollie.

In 1975, at a time when Laurel and Hardy films were popular on British television, the UK branch of United Artists Records produced an album of dialogue and songs, Laurel & Hardy – The Golden Age Of Hollywood Comedy, which included "The Trail of the Lonesome Pine". The song was released as a single and reached No. 2 in the UK Singles Chart, thanks largely to being championed by disc jockey John Peel on his Radio 1 evening show. It was kept from the number-one position by "Bohemian Rhapsody" by Queen.

In 1983 it was also recorded (as "Blue Ridge Mountains of Virginia") by Tokyo Blade.

"The Trail of the Lonesome Pine" was an inspiration in the work of Gertrude Stein.

The song's melody and chorus has also been used for an American square dance in the "singing square" style, in which the dance caller's instructions are fitted to the melody and the dancers sometimes sing along on the chorus as they return to place at the end of each repetition of the group dance figure.

== Lyrics ==
The Trail of the Lonesome Pine
Albert Campbell and Henry Burr (1913)

The song refers to the Blue Ridge Mountains of Virginia. The singer expresses his love for his girl, June, who is waiting for him under the titular pine tree.

Verse 1

On a mountain in Virginia
Stands a lonesome pine
Just below is the cabin home
Of a little girl of mine
Her name is June, and very, very soon
She’ll belong to me
For I know she’s waiting there for me
‘Neath that lone pine tree

Chorus

In the Blue Ridge Mountains of Virginia
On the trail of the lonesome pine
In the pale moonshine our hearts entwine
Where she carved her name and I carved mine
Oh, June, like the mountains I’m blue
Like the pine I am lonesome for you
In the Blue Ridge Mountains of Virginia
On the trail of the lonesome pine

Verse 2

I can hear the tinkling waterfall
Far among the hills
Bluebirds sing each so merrily
To his mate in rapture trills
They seem to say, “Your June is lonesome, too”
Longing fills her eyes
She is waiting for you patiently
Where the pine tree sighs

== Influence ==
The song's title provided the source of the name of an influential Call of Cthulhu role-playing game scenario, "The Trail of the Loathsome Slime".

== Bibliography ==
- MacDonald, Ballard (w.); Carroll, Harry (m.). "The Trail of the Lonesome Pine" (Sheet music). New York: Shapiro, Bernstein & Co., Inc. (1913).
