= Laurel and Hardy music =

Comedy duo soundtrack releases

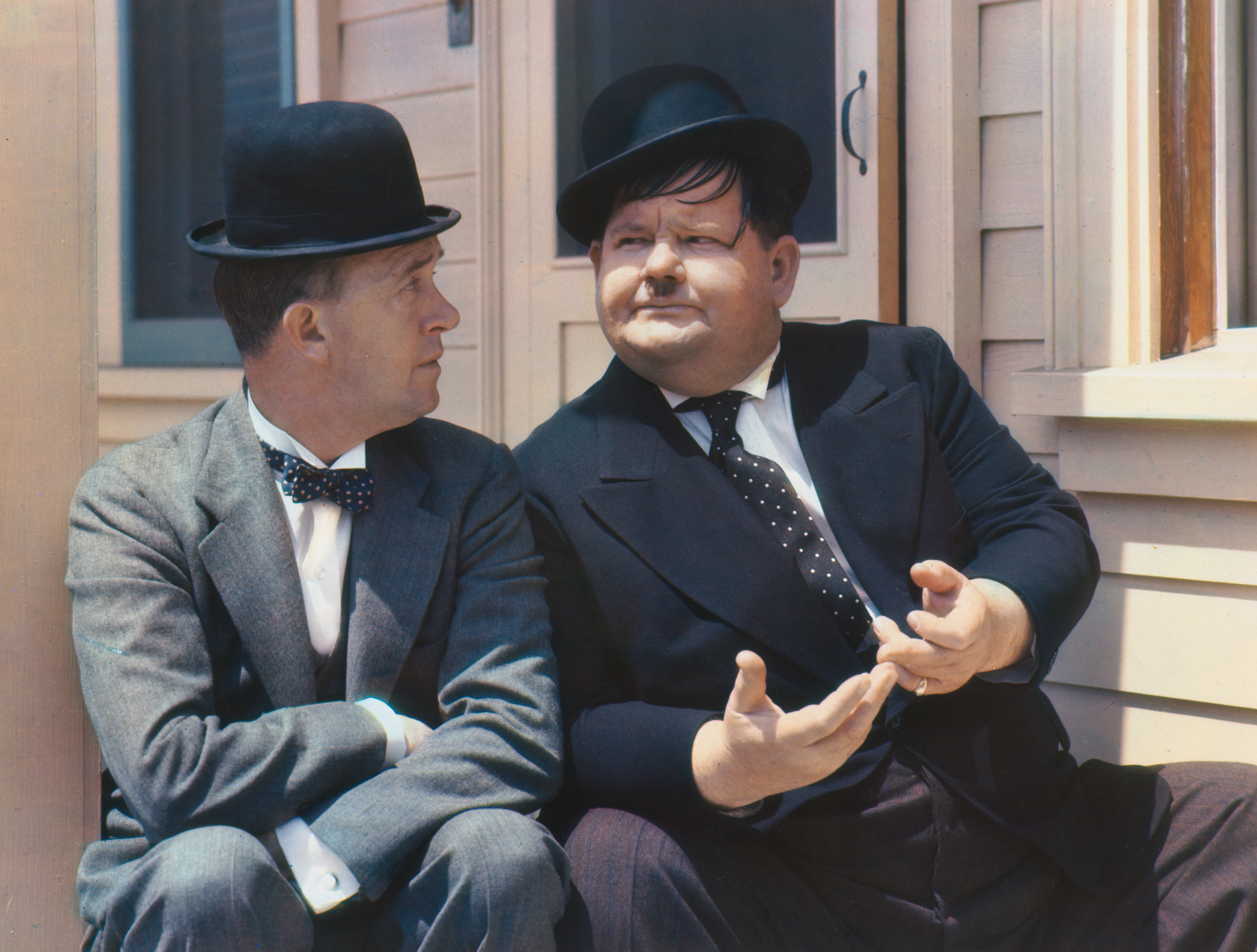
Stan Laurel and Oliver Hardy, circa 1938

Laurel and Hardy were primarily comedy film actors. However, many of their films featured songs, and some are considered as musicals in their own right. The composer Leroy Shield scored most of Laurel and Hardy sound shorts although they were often misattributed to Marvin Hatley.

== Cuckoo theme ==
Common cuckoo song, Kaluga region, Russia

The duo's "cuckoo" theme, entitled "Dance of The Cuckoos", was composed by Roach musical director Marvin Hatley as the on-the-hour chime for the Roach studio radio station, then known as KFVD. Laurel heard the tune on the station, and asked Hatley to use it as the Laurel and Hardy theme song. Generally known as "The Dance of the Cuckoos" it was copyrighted with the name "Coo ! coo ! radio time signal" and was first heard on the opening credits for Blotto (1930) and the Spanish version of Night Owls (1930). In Laurel's eyes, the song's melody represented Hardy's character (pompous and dramatic), while the harmony represented Laurel's own character (somewhat out of key, and only able to register two notes: "cu-coo"). The original theme, recorded by two clarinets in 1930, was re-recorded with a full orchestra in 1935. The cu-coo motif is based on the call of the common cuckoo.

== Dance routines ==
A number of their songs are accompanied with a dance routine, the most famous of which is their dance to the song "At The Ball, That's All" sung by The Avalon Boys in Way Out West (1937).

== Trail of the Lonesome Pine ==
The original cover of Trail Of The Lonesome Pine (1975)

A compilation of songs from their films, called Trail of the Lonesome Pine, was released in 1975. Oliver was a trained singer and sang many of the tracks solo with Stan singing in duet occasionally. A number of the songs were sung by neither Laurel nor Hardy.

| No. | Title | Writer(s) | Performer(s) | Length |
|---|---|---|---|---|
| 1. | "Dance of The Cuckoos" | | | 0:26 |
| 2. | "Introduction" | | | 0:16 |
| 3. | "The Trail of the Lonesome Pine" | Ballard MacDonald | | 2:01 |
| 4. | "At The Ball, That's All" | J. Leubrie Hill | | 2:01 |
| 5. | "I Want To Be In Dixie" | | | 2:01 |
| 6. | "Honolulu Baby" | Marvin Hatley | Ty Parvis with Laurel and Hardy | 2:07 |
| 7. | "Stan's Voice" | | | 0:37 |
| 8. | "Lazy Moon" | Bob Cole and J. Rosamond Johnson | | 3:06 |
| 9. | "Swing Along, Chillun" | | | 1:03 |
| 10. | "I Want To Go Back To Michigan" | | | 1:28 |
| 11. | "Dance of The Cuckoos" | | | 0:27 |
| 12. | "I Can't Get Over The Alps" | | | 2:29 |
| 13. | "The Mousetrap Song" | | | 0:38 |
| 14. | "The Cricket Song" | | | 1:45 |
| 15. | "Could You Say No" | | | 1:32 |
| 16. | "Let Me Call You Sweetheart" | | | 0:59 |
| 17. | "Never Mind Bo Peep" | | | 3:52 |
| 18. | "The Curse of An Aching Heart" | | | 1:43 |
| 19. | "The Ideal of My Dreams" | | | 1:24 |
| 20. | "Fra Diavolo" | | | 3:20 |
| 21. | "The Heart of A Gypsy" | | | 1:45 |
| 22. | "I Dreamt I Dwelt In Marble Halls" | | | 3:24 |
| 23. | "Shine On, Harvest Moon" | | | 1:13 |
| 24. | "The Dance of The Cuckoos" | | | 5:30 |

== Beau Hunks ==
In 1992 and 1995, the Dutch orchestra The Beau Hunks released two albums, The Beau Hunks Play the Original Laurel & Hardy Music, on which they recreated original background music as heard in Laurel & Hardy's movies. According to the Lambiek Comiclopedia, American cartoonist Robert Crumb was a fan of "Marvin Hatley's background music" for The Little Rascals and Laurel & Hardy.

== Stan & Ollie ==
The 2018 biographical film Stan & Ollie includes the actors recreating Laurel and Hardy's routine of singing of "The Trail of the Lonesome Pine" as done on stage, as well as depictions of their dance routine from Way Out West.
