= Francis Joins the WACS =

1954 film by Arthur Lubin

- VHS cover
- Directed by: Arthur Lubin
- Written by: Devery Freeman; James B. Allardice; Dorothy Davenport (add. dialogue); David Stern (characters)
- Based on: story "Mr WAC" by Herbert Baker
- Produced by: Ted Richmond
- Starring: Donald O'Connor; Julie Adams; Mamie Van Doren; Chill Wills
- Cinematography: Irving Glassberg
- Edited by: Ted Kent
- Music by: Irving Gertz; Henry Mancini; Frank Skinner
- Production company: Universal Pictures
- Distributed by: Universal-International
- Release date: July 30, 1954
- Running time: 95 minutes
- Country: United States
- Language: English
- Box office: $1.9 million (US and Canada rental)

Francis Joins the WACS is a 1954 American black-and-white comedy film from Universal-International, produced by Ted Richmond, directed by Arthur Lubin and starring Donald O'Connor, Julie Adams, ZaSu Pitts, Mamie Van Doren and Chill Wills in two roles, including that of the distinctive voice of Francis in voice-over.

This is the fifth film in Universal-International's Francis the Talking Mule series.

== Plot ==
A computer error mistakenly assigns junior officer Peter Stirling to the Women's Army Corps (WAC). Peter's old friend Francis, a talking mule, helps him through his various military and personal problems, including several familiar stays in the base's psychiatric ward. The WACs are initially highly suspicious of him, suspecting him of having been sent by General Ben Kaye to sabotage their efforts to prove themselves. However, with the assistance of Francis, he is able to win their trust and prove their worth.

The film is noteworthy for Chill Wills, the voice of Francis, appearing on screen as General Kaye and the mule, who very reluctantly talks to him in order to prove Peter is not crazy.

== Cast ==
- Donald O'Connor as Peter Stirling
- Julie Adams as Captain Jane Parker (as Julia Adams)
- Mamie Van Doren as Corporal Bunky Hilstrom
- Chill Wills as General Benjamin Kaye / voice of Francis
- Lynn Bari as Major Louise Simpson
- ZaSu Pitts as Lieutenant Valerie Humpert. Pitts played the same character in the first film of the series.
- Joan Shawlee as Sergeant Kipp
- Allison Hayes as Lieutenant Dickson
- Mara Corday as Kate
- Karen Kadler as Marge
- Elsie Holmes as Bessie

== Production ==
Donald O'Connor's contract with Universal had expired, so there was some doubt that he would reprise his role before he agreed to make another film.

Leonard Goldstein did not return as producer, being replaced by Ted Richmond.

Although Francis Joins the WACS was announced in late 1952, filming did not start until February 1954.

== Reception ==
The Variety review stated that "The boxoffice outlook is good, since the same type of screwball comedy that has characterized this series is put forth slickly in this one."

According to a later issue of Variety, the film outgrossed the second, third and fourth in the Francis series.

== Home media ==
Universal released all seven Francis films as a set on three Region 1 and Region 4 DVDs, Francis the Talking Mule: The Complete Collection.
