= Francis Goes to West Point =

1952 American black-and-white comedy film

- Theatrical release poster
- Directed by: Arthur Lubin
- Written by: Oscar Brodney; David Stern (characters)
- Produced by: Leonard Goldstein
- Starring: Donald O'Connor; Lori Nelson; Alice Kelley; Gregg Palmer
- Cinematography: Carl E. Guthrie
- Edited by: Milton Carruth
- Music by: Milton Rosen; Frank Skinner; Herman Stein
- Distributed by: Universal-International
- Release date: July 1952
- Running time: 81 minutes
- Country: United States
- Language: English
- Box office: $2 million (U.S. rentals)

Francis Goes to West Point is a 1952 American comedy film produced by Leonard Goldstein, directed by Arthur Lubin and starring Donald O'Connor, Lori Nelson, Alice Kelley and Gregg Palmer. The distinctive voice of Francis is provided by actor Chill Wills.

The film is the third in Universal-International's Francis the Talking Mule series.

== Plot ==
Bumbling former World War II serviceman Peter Stirling is sent to the United States Army's military academy at West Point as a reward for stopping a plot to bomb his government workplace. After enrolling, he is privately tutored by his old Army mule friend Francis, which causes trouble when he reveals that his tutor is one of West Point's mascots.

Peter is an important confidant to roommate Wilbur Van Allen, the football team's star quarterback. Van Allen feels pressured to attend West Point by his military family and is considering resigning to marry his fiancée Barbara Atwood, as cadets are not allowed to be married.

Francis is on the mascot sidelines for every Army football game, and his advice whispered to coach Chadwick helps the team to an undefeated season. When Army is losing to Navy at halftime, Francis reveals himself and delivers an inspirational locker-room speech that propels Army to victory.

Thinking that he is protecting Van Allen, Peter takes the blame when a false rumor spreads that an important cadet is married. The Army plans to submit Francis for scientific research, so he flees, but Peter remains behind because Francis assumes Peter has gained enough self-confidence to survive without him.

== Cast ==
- Donald O'Connor as Peter Stirling
- Lori Nelson as Barbara Atwood
- Alice Kelley as Cynthia Daniels
- Gregg Palmer as William Norton (as Palmer Lee)
- William Reynolds as Wilbur Van Allen
- Les Tremayne as Colonel Daniels
- Otto Hulett as Coach Chadwick
- David Janssen as Corporal Thomas
- James Best as Corporal Ransom
- Leonard Nimoy as Cadet football player #52 (uncredited)
- Pierre Watkin as Colonel Hedley (uncredited)

== Production ==
Soon after Francis Goes to the Races (1951), the previous film in the Francis series, was completed, screenwriter Oscar Brodney began work on a West Point film story for the next Francis feature.

Production began on November 27, 1951, with additional second-unit production on location at West Point.

== Reception ==
In a contemporary review for The New York Times, critic Oscar Godbout wrote: "[T]his foundation gag was curried pretty thin on the second lap. This third entry never gets away from the starting post. ... Oscar Brodney wrote the aging and familiar situations that seem to be the core of every West Point film, while Arthur Lubin directed the proceedings with stout disdain for anything imaginative."
