= Robert Arthur (film producer) =

American screenwriter and producer

- Born: Robert Arthur Feder; November 1, 1909; New York, New York, U.S.
- Died: October 28, 1986 (aged 76); Beverly Hills, California, U.S.
- Occupations: Screenwriter; producer
- Years active: 1937–1981
- Spouse: Goldie Appleby (1939–1986)

Robert Arthur (November 1, 1909 – October 28, 1986) was an American screenwriter and producer best known for his long association with Universal Studios.

== Early life and career ==
Born in New York as Robert Arthur Feder, he attended Southwestern University and the University of Southern California before going to work in the oil industry in 1929.

He began working as a screenwriter and joined MGM in 1937, where he wrote the screenplay for New Moon (1940) and the story for Chip Off the Old Block (1944).

During World War II, he served under Pare Lorentz in the Army's Air Transport Command and produced 600 short training films.

== Universal ==
After the war, he joined Universal Pictures and his first production was the successful Buck Privates Come Home (1947) starring Abbott and Costello. He produced five further films for Abbott and Costello - The Wistful Widow of Wagon Gap (1947), Abbott and Costello Meet Frankenstein (1948), Mexican Hayride (1948), Abbott and Costello Meet the Killer, Boris Karloff (1949) and Abbott and Costello in the Foreign Legion (1950).

He produced the first of the popular Francis the Talking Mule film series in 1950 as well as the last, Francis in the Haunted House (1956). He also wrote the story for Francis Goes to the Races.

Arthur produced Louisa (1950), which starred Ronald Reagan, who became a good friend. In 1965, Arthur said this was his favorite movie.

He left Universal and made Starlift (1951) and The Story of Will Rogers (1952) for Warner Bros. and The Big Heat (1953) and The Long Gray Line for Columbia Pictures before returning to Universal.

In 1955, MGM offered Arthur a contract, but he preferred to work at Universal. He later said, "they decided to hire me for as long as I care to work for. I'll tell you why I like this studio. When I turn out a clinker, my bosses say 'We made a flop.' Turn out a good one and they say 'You made a hell of a picture.'"

He signed Stanley Shapiro who wrote several commercially successful comedies for Arthur including The Perfect Furlough (1958), Operation Petticoat (1959), Lover Come Back (1961), and That Touch of Mink (1962). The first two films were directed by Blake Edwards, which helped launch his career. He also produced Bobby Darrin's debut film Come September (1961). During this time, he also produced The Spiral Road.

In 1965, he signed a "lifetime" contract with Universal. At that time, 5 of Universal's top 10 highest-grossing films had been produced by Arthur - Operation Petticoat, That Touch of Mink, Come September, Lover Come Back and Shenandoah (1965). A Man Could Get Killed (1966) was his 50th production.

His last film as producer was One More Train to Rob (1971) with George Peppard.

Arthur died in 1986 at the age of seventy-six and was interred in Forest Lawn – Hollywood Hills Cemetery in Los Angeles. Lew Wasserman said Arthur as "a true professional, a fine man and good friend. His associates at Universal will miss his talents and his warmth."

== Personal life ==
Arthur was married to Goldie Appleby, who served as an executive secretary to Irving Thalberg at MGM and to Samuel Goldwyn during World War II. They were married for forty-seven years, until his death. Goldie Arthur died on December 24, 1998, at Cedars-Sinai Medical Center in Los Angeles, following a stroke.

== Filmography ==
(producer unless otherwise specified)

- Meet the Boy Friend (1937) - story only
- New Moon (1940) - screenplay only
- Chip Off the Old Block (1944) - story only
- Buck Privates Come Home (1947)
- The Wistful Widow of Wagon Gap (1947)
- Are You with It? (1948)
- Abbott and Costello Meet Frankenstein (1948)
- For the Love of Mary (1948)
- Mexican Hayride (1948)
- Abbott and Costello Meet the Killer Boris Karloff (1949)
- The Gal Who Took the West (1949)
- Bagdad (1949)
- Francis (1950)
- Buccaneer's Girl (1959)
- Curtain Call at Cactus Creek (1959)
- Louisa (1950)
- Abbott and Costello in the Foreign Legion (1950)
- Francis Goes to the Races (1951) - story only
- The Golden Horde (1951)
- Starlift (1951)
- The Story of Will Rogers (1952)
- The Big Heat (1953)
- The Black Shield of Falworth (1954)
- Ricochet Romance (1954)
- The Long Gray Line (1955)
- Lady Godiva of Coventry (1955)
- A Day of Fury (1956)
- Francis in the Haunted House (1956)
- Pillars of the Sky (1956)
- Kelly and Me (1956)
- Mister Cory (1957)
- The Midnight Story (1957)
- Man of a Thousand Faces (1957)
- Flood Tide (1958)
- A Time to Love and a Time to Die (1958)
- The Perfect Furlough (1958)
- Operation Petticoat (1959)
- The Great Impostor (1960)
- Come September (1960)
- Lover Come Back (1961)
- That Touch of Mink (1962)
- The Spiral Road (1962)
- For Love or Money (1963)
- Captain Newman, M.D. (1963)
- The Brass Bottle (1964)
- Bedtime Story (1964)
- Father Goose (1964)
- Shenandoah (1965)
- A Very Special Favor (1965)
- A Man Could Get Killed (1966)
- Blindfold (1966)
- The King's Pirate (1967)
- Hellfighters (1968)
- Sweet Charity (1969)
- One More Train to Rob (1971)
