= Zenobia (film) =

1939 film by Gordon Douglas

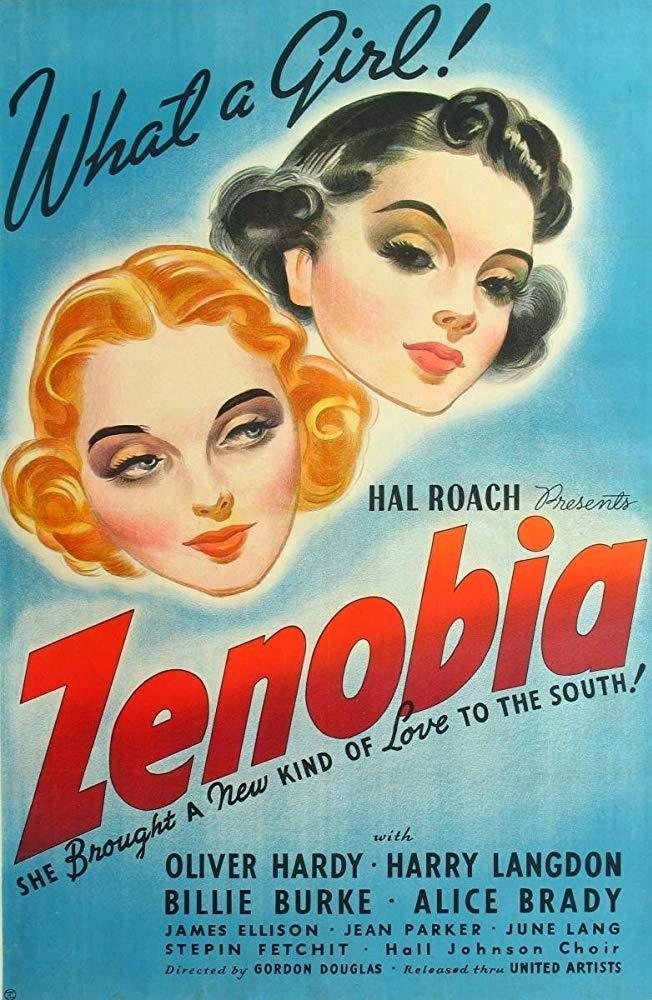
- Theatrical Poster
- Directed by: Gordon Douglas
- Written by: Corey Ford
- Based on: "Zenobia's Infidelity" by H. C. Bunner
- Produced by: Hal Roach
- Starring: Oliver Hardy; Harry Langdon; Billie Burke; Alice Brady; Hattie McDaniel
- Cinematography: Karl Struss; Norbert Brodine
- Edited by: Bert Jordan
- Music by: Marvin Hatley
- Distributed by: United Artists
- Release date: April 21, 1939
- Running time: 73 min. 65 min (colour cut edition)
- Country: United States
- Language: English
- Box office: $130,051

Zenobia (also known as Elephants Never Forget (UK) and It's Spring Again) is a 1939 comedy film directed by Gordon Douglas and starring Oliver Hardy, Harry Langdon, Billie Burke, Alice Brady, James Ellison, Jean Parker, June Lang, Stepin Fetchit and Hattie McDaniel. The source of the film was the 1891 short story "Zenobia's Infidelity" by H. C. Bunner, which was originally purchased by producer Hal Roach as a vehicle for Roland Young.

== Plot ==
In 1870, Dr. Henry Tibbett, a Mississippi country doctor is called on by a travelling circus trainer to cure his sick elephant. After the doctor heals the grateful beast, the elephant becomes so attached to him that it starts to follow him everywhere. This leads to the trainer suing Dr. Tibbett for alienation of affection.

The presence of the elephant also endangers the engagement of Dr. Tibbett's daughter Mary to the son of the prominent Carter family, who are social snobs looking for an excuse to call off the wedding.

Things are resolved to everyone's satisfaction when the "male" elephant is discovered to be pregnant; and Dr. Tibbett helps deliver a healthy baby pachyderm.

== Cast ==
- Oliver Hardy as Dr. Tibbett
- Harry Langdon as Prof. McCrackle
- Billie Burke as Mrs. Tibbett
- Alice Brady as Mrs. Carter
- James Ellison as Jeff Carter
- Jean Parker as Mary Tibbett
- June Lang as Virginia
- Olin Howland as Attorney Culpepper
- J. Farrell MacDonald as the Judge
- Stepin Fetchit as Zero
- Hattie McDaniel as Dehlia (credited as "Hattie McDaniels")
- Philip Hurlic as Zeke (Declaration of Independence)
- Hobart Cavanaugh as Mr. Dover
- Clem Bevans as the Sheriff
- Tommy Mack as the Butcher
- Robert Dudley as the Court Clerk
- The Hall Johnson Choir
- Zenobia as 'Miss Zenobia' - the Elephant
- Chester Conklin as Farmer (uncredited)
- Nigel De Brulier as Townsman (uncredited)

== Background ==
Zenobia is one of the few films after the teaming of Laurel and Hardy that features Hardy without Stan Laurel, the result of a contract dispute between Laurel and producer Hal Roach. Roach maintained separate contracts for each performer, rather than a team contract, which would have offered them more control over their careers. Zenobia was Roach's attempt to create a new comedic pair without Laurel, and a series of films with Hardy and Langdon was planned. The dispute was short-lived, however, and Laurel and Hardy were reunited shortly thereafter.

== Reception ==
The film performed poorly at the box office. United Artists even had trouble booking it into cinemas.

The New York Times wrote on May 15, 1939, that the film:

"...[was] a rough idea of what would happen to Gone With the Wind if Hal Roach had produced it ... an antebellum, costume romance in slapstick, in which an elephant adopts Oliver Hardy and, it appears, Harry Langdon has adopted the partnership perquisites formerly reserved for Stan Laurel."

Then—playing on the potential for a new comedy team of Hardy and Langdon—the reviewer said:

"Harry Langdon's pale and beautifully blank countenance ... has probably already excited the professional jealousy of Mr. Laurel."

== In popular culture ==
The film is mentioned quite frequently (referred to as "the elephant movie") during the biopic Stan and Ollie (2018). In the film, Laurel begrudged Hardy for doing the film; however, this was not the case in real life, as it was Laurel himself who encouraged Hardy to continue at Hal Roach Studios without him. After his contract was up, Hardy refused to form a new team with Langdon, left Roach, and followed Laurel to 20th Century Fox.

=== Restoration ===
The 35mm nitrate stock was digitally restored, and released on DVD in 2018. Unrestored and restored comparisons of the same scenes appear side-by-side in the menu's 'Special Features'. Millions of imperfections were removed.

== Music ==
- The music is by Marvin Hatley, the composer of "Dance of The Cuckoos", Laurel and Hardy's famous theme song.

== See also ==
- Filmography of Oliver Hardy
