= New Orleans Item-Tribune =

American newspaper

The New Orleans Item, March 7, 1916

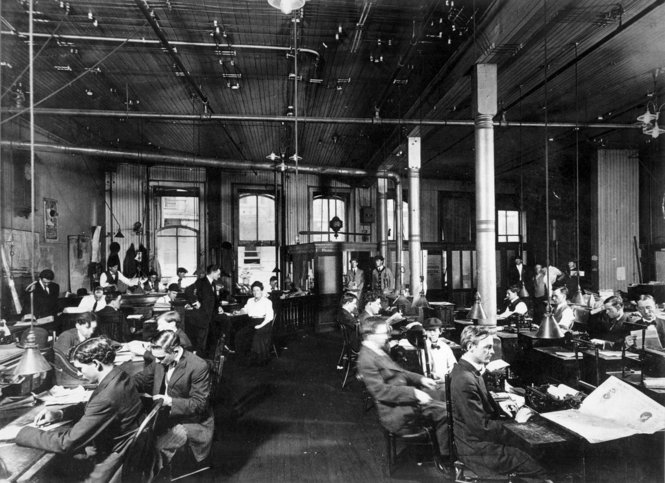
The New Orleans Item newsroom at work, circa 1900

The New Orleans Item-Tribune, sometimes rendered in press accounts as the New Orleans Item and Tribune, was an American newspaper published in New Orleans, Louisiana, in various forms from 1871 to 1958.

== Early history ==
The newspaper, referred to in 1941 as "the south's oldest afternoon daily paper", was first published in 1875 as The New Orleans Item, an afternoon paper. Subscriptions were six dollars a year, and the paper claimed to have the largest circulation in New Orleans, describing itself as "Impartial, Able, Newsy, and Bright."

In 1924, it spawned a morning sister, the Morning Tribune. The papers published a single Sunday edition, the Item-Tribune, beginning December 21, 1924. It expanded its name to become the Sunday Item-Tribune on February 10, 1935.

Comic-book artist Jack Sparling worked briefly as a gag cartoonist for the paper circa the late 1930s.

== Item-Tribune years ==
In 1936, the two papers' broadsheet format was changed to tabloid size, and on January 13, 1941, the papers merged as the daily and Sunday Item-Tribune. The term was already in use before this, with Time magazine, for example, referring to the two papers in this combined form in 1926. The Tribune ceased publication on January 11, 1941, though the Sunday Item-Tribune did not change its name.

On June 27, 1941, the newspaper's longtime publisher and president, Colonel James M. Thomson, announced the paper's sale to Ralph Nicholson, vice president, treasurer and general manager of the Tampa Times, with Thomson to serve as president of the Item Co., Inc., the newly formed entity that purchased the paper.

In 1949, David Stern III, author of the Francis the Talking Mule books that later became a film series, and the son of prominent Philadelphia publisher J. David Stern, purchased the paper for $2 million. He ran the paper until its 1958 merger.

The paper, which is preserved by the National Endowment for the Humanities and The Library of Congress from its June 11, 1902, issue through its last, September 14, 1958, was published daily until dropping the Saturday edition beginning December 17, 1950.

== Merger with Daily States ==
In 1958, the Item-Tribune merged with the Daily States (founded in 1880) to form the New Orleans Daily States-Item. In 1962, publisher and businessman Samuel I. Newhouse bought the morning Times-Picayune as well as the afternoon States-Item, which continued to be published separately until they were merged and combined in 1980.
