= The Philadelphia Record =

Defunct American newspaper

- Type: Morning daily
- Publisher: William M. Singerly (1877–1898); J. David Stern (1928–1947)
- Founded: 1877 (by Singerly)
- Ceased publication: 1947
- Political alignment: Democratic Party
- Language: English
- Headquarters: Philadelphia, Pennsylvania
- OCLC number: 15262211

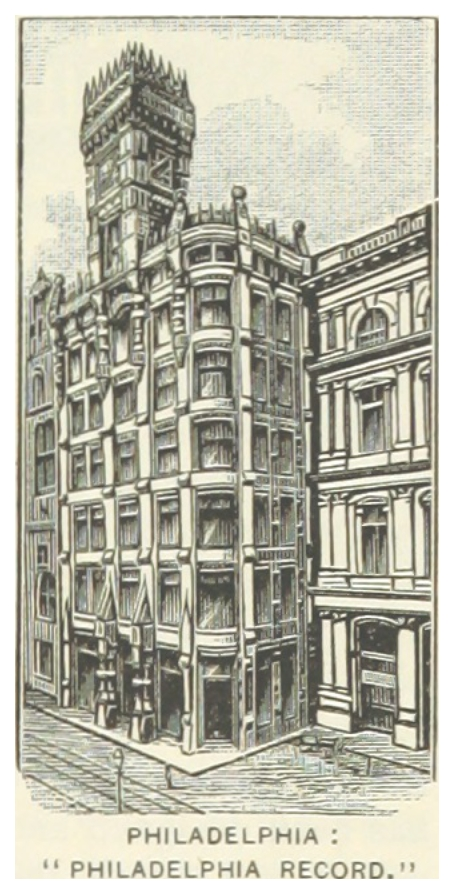
1891

The Philadelphia Record was a daily newspaper published in Philadelphia, Pennsylvania from 1877 until 1947. It became among the most circulated papers in the city and was at some points the circulation leader.

== History ==
The Public Record was a newspaper first published in Philadelphia on May 14, 1870; it was founded by William J. Swain, son of William Moseley Swain, who had founded the Public Ledger. At the time it was published at Clark's Hall at 3rd and Chestnut Streets.

In 1877, William M. Singerly acquired the small-circulation paper and renamed it the Record, and lowered its price to one-cent. By 1894, The New York Times praised it as "one of the best and most widely circulated newspapers in the United States." Despite the dire economic state at the time, the Record "held its own", and sold 57,000,000 copies in 1893. At that time, it was the most widely read newspaper in the city and equaled the combined circulation of any two of its Philadelphian competitors. Its printing facilities were lauded as modern and both its foreign and domestic reporting as accurate and prompt. The Record's headquarters were at 917–919 Chestnut Street, in a building designed by Willis G. Hale. After Singerly died in 1898, the paper was acquired by the Wanamakers. It was the first newspaper in Philadelphia to use the Linotype machine.

After Rodman Wanamaker died in 1928, the paper was bought by J. David Stern, owner of the Courier-Post in nearby Camden, New Jersey; he also moved the headquarters of the Record in November of that year from 917–919 Chestnut Street to the former Packard Motor Corporation Building at 317–319 N. Broad Street. Though the circulation of the Record was only 123,000 when he bought it, Stern was able to raise it to 315,000 within a few years.

During the Great Depression, the Record became one of only two morning newspapers in the city after the Public Ledger morning and Sunday editions were merged with The Philadelphia Inquirer in 1933. In 1936, the Record had a weekday circulation of 328,322 and Sunday circulation of 369,525. By comparison, it led the Inquirer during the week, when the competitor sold 280,093 copies, but trailed on Sundays, when the Inquirer sold 669,152 copies. That year, Moses Annenberg bought the Inquirer, and the rivalry between the publications significantly increased. The two papers, whose buildings were within sight of each other, engaged in a "duel of keep-the-lights-on", in which their employees attempted to log longer workdays than their competitors. Both newspapers during this time accused the other of attempts to steal stories.

In the 1930s, as the competition stiffened between the Record and its primary morning competitor, the Inquirer, both increased their daily price to 3 cents (about $0.7 in inflation-adjusted terms). From July 1936 to 1938, the Record's circulation fell by 40%. In the latter year, the Record's weekday circulation had fallen to 204,000 and its Sunday edition to 362,783. During the late 1930s, the Record, a Democratic Party-aligned publication led by publisher J. David Stern, was seen as a voice for the executives in both the federal and state governments. Red Smith, who would later win a Pulitzer Prize with the New York Times, was a sportswriter for the Record from 1936 to 1945.

The Record had a reputation for social activism. It ran stories that broke up bogus medical colleges, stopped the sale of dead bodies, campaigned against Sunday blue laws, and recommended going off the gold standard. Once, outraged at the high price of coal, the newspaper bought the output of a coal mine and sold it at discounted prices to the public. The Record made history in the early 1930s by hiring Orrin C. Evans as "the first black writer to cover general assignments for a mainstream white newspaper in the United States;" as a staff writer, Evans covered many topics including segregation in the armed services during World War II.

In 1947, the Record went out of business and sold its assets to the Philadelphia Bulletin after a drawn-out strike.
