= Stan & Ollie =

2018 film by Jon S. Baird

- Theatrical release poster
- Directed by: Jon S. Baird
- Written by: Jeff Pope
- Based on: Laurel and Hardy: The British Tours by A.J. Marriot
- Produced by: Faye Ward
- Starring: Steve Coogan; John C. Reilly; Shirley Henderson; Nina Arianda; Rufus Jones; Danny Huston
- Cinematography: Laurie Rose
- Edited by: Úna Ní Dhonghaíle; Billy Sneddon
- Music by: Rolfe Kent
- Production companies: Entertainment One; BBC Films; Fable Pictures; Sonesta Films
- Distributed by: Sony Pictures Classics (United States); Entertainment One (Canada, United Kingdom and Ireland)
- Release dates: 21 October 2018 (BFI London Film Festival); 28 December 2018 (United States); 11 January 2019 (United Kingdom)
- Running time: 98 minutes
- Countries: United Kingdom; Canada; United States
- Language: English
- Budget: $10 million
- Box office: $29 million

Stan & Ollie is a 2018 biographical comedy-drama film directed by Jon S. Baird. The script, written by Jeff Pope, was inspired by Laurel and Hardy: The British Tours by A.J. Marriot which chronicled the later years of the comedy double act Laurel and Hardy; the film stars Steve Coogan and John C. Reilly as Stan Laurel and Oliver Hardy. The film focuses on details of the comedy duo's personal relationship while relating how they embarked on a gruelling music hall tour of the United Kingdom and Ireland during 1953 and struggled to get another film made.

The film premiered on 21 October 2018 at the closing night gala of the BFI London Film Festival. It was released in the United States on 28 December 2018 and in the United Kingdom on 11 January 2019. At the 76th Golden Globe Awards, Reilly was nominated for Best Actor – Motion Picture Musical or Comedy, and at the 72nd British Academy Film Awards the film earned three nominations, including Best British Film and Best Actor in a Leading Role for Coogan.

== Plot ==
In 1937, while making Way Out West, Stan Laurel and Oliver Hardy discuss their contracts, agreeing they are not being justly compensated. Stan advocates leaving Hal Roach to set up their own production company while Oliver is reluctant to rock the boat. Later, at Fox Studios, Stan waits for Oliver so they can sign to Fox. Oliver does not arrive and remains tied to Roach, who puts him in the film Zenobia with an elephant, leading to a rift between the two men.

In 1953, they embark on a music hall tour of the UK and Ireland while trying to get a comedic movie of Robin Hood made. Poor publicity in Britain has the tour begin in near-empty backstreet theatres as producer Bernard Delfont focuses on his up-and-coming star Norman Wisdom. Public appearances improve ticket sales, and they sell out much larger prestigious venues.

Meanwhile, driven by Stan, they continue to write and develop the movie against an ominous silence from its London producer. Stan discovers the movie has been cancelled for insufficient funding. Unable to tell Oliver, he continues work on the script.

Their wives, Ida Laurel and Lucille Hardy, join them at the Savoy Hotel. They sell out the Lyceum Theatre where, at the opening night party, Ida mentions the "elephant movie" resulting in an argument over the contract fiasco 16 years earlier. Stan expresses resentment at Oliver's betrayal of their friendship and accuses him of laziness; Oliver says they were never true friends, that Stan is a hollow man hiding behind his typewriter. When Stan says, "I loved us", Oliver counters that Stan loved Laurel and Hardy, "but you never loved me."

Judging a beauty contest in Worthing, Oliver pointedly rebuffs Stan's attempts at conversation and collapses as Stan addresses the crowd. Delfont suggests Stan replace him with English comic Nobby Cook. Stan goes to Oliver who tells him he is retiring. Going on stage could be fatal, so Oliver has promised Lucille he will not, and they will leave for the United States as soon as possible. They agree it is for the best, that Stan will carry on with a new partner, and that they had not meant the things they said in their argument.

At the next show, Stan observes Nobby Cook onstage from the wings as the orchestra tunes up. Delfont and Ida watch from a box as the Laurel and Hardy Overture is played, only to be interrupted by an announcement that the performance has been cancelled. Ida finds Stan at the bar, he says he loves Oliver and will not continue the tour without him, and not to upset Oliver by telling him. Oliver, in his room, recalls the doctor's words while reminiscing appreciative fans. Lucille returns from an errand to find him gone; he is at Stan's door telling him not to leave as they have shows to perform.

On the boat to Ireland Stan confesses there is no longer a movie and Oliver says he knew, and thought Stan knew he knew. Stan asks why, then, did they continue to rehearse, and Oliver asks, "What else are we going to do?" A large crowd welcomes their arrival in Ireland as church bells ring out their tune. On stage, Stan expresses concern for Oliver's condition in moments when they are hidden from the audience and says they need not finish with the song. Oliver says he is fine, and surprises Stan by announcing to the audience that they will finish with a dance - to Lucille's consternation. As they perform "At the Ball, That's All" Ida takes, and squeezes, Lucille's hand. Stan and Ollie take their bow to wild cheering and applause.

A text epilogue explains they never performed together again; Oliver's health did not recover and he died in 1957. Stan refused all offers to perform without Oliver but continued, until his death in 1965, to write material for Laurel and Hardy.

== Real-life background ==
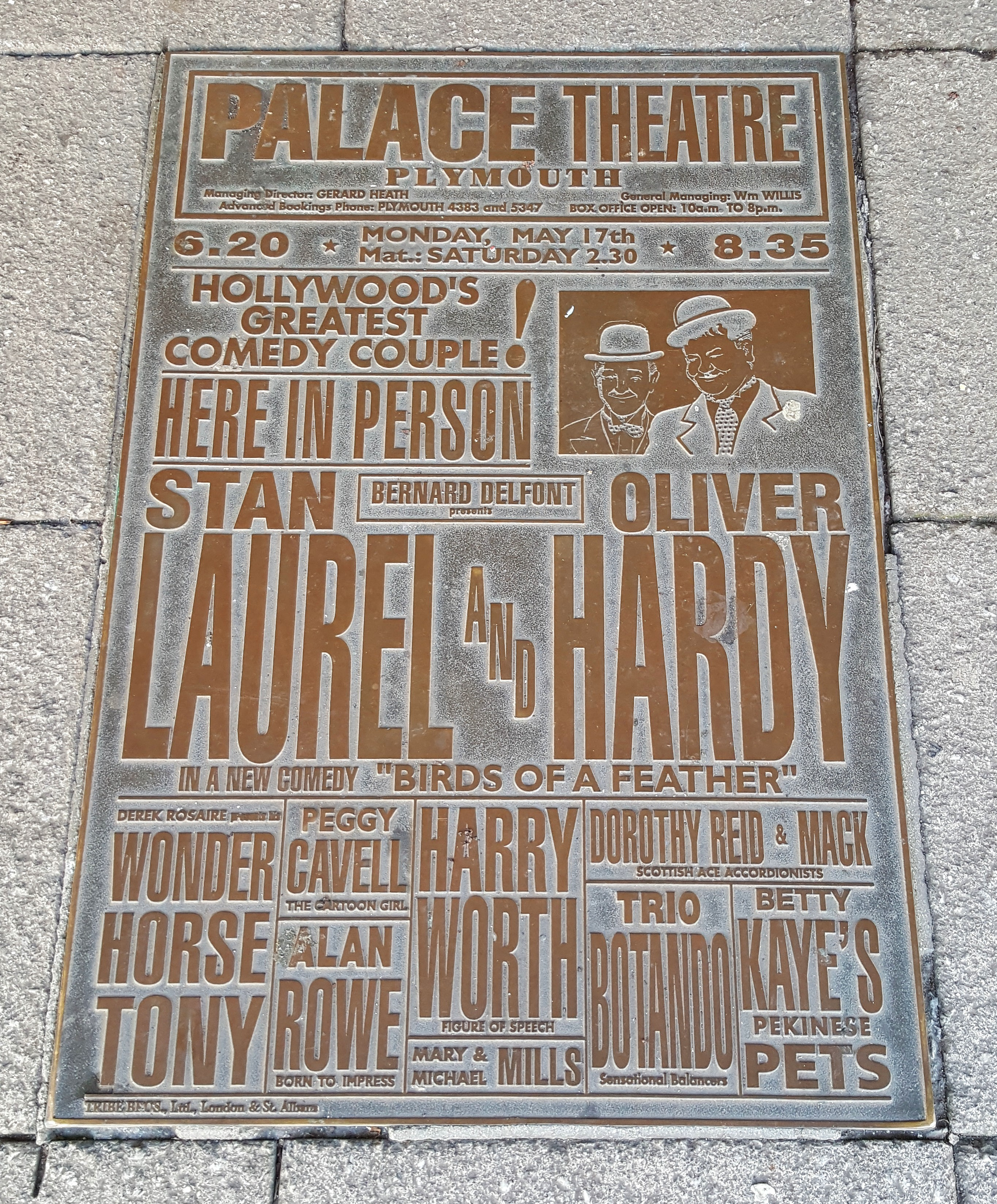
A brass plate on the pavement outside the Palace Theatre, Plymouth commemorates Laurel and Hardy's final stage appearance on 17 May 1954

The film's story differs from events as they actually happened; while the film is based on fact, the sequence of events has been altered. The "Mrs. Laurel" character is inaccurate: Laurel had married Ida Kitaeva Raphael in 1946, but the film character is based on one of his former wives, Countess Illeana. The scene of Laurel waiting for Hardy at the 20th Century-Fox studios, with Hardy preferring to remain with Hal Roach, is fictitious: while Laurel's contract with Roach had expired, Hardy's had not. Moreover, the team did not report to Fox until July 11, 1941, well after both had severed their connections with Roach. The scene of Laurel and Hardy arguing bitterly was staged for dramatic effect; in reality the comedians never argued. Lucille Hardy, his widow, remembered Hardy being angry with Laurel only once, out of Laurel's hearing: the comedians had agreed to present a strong, united front when negotiating with Hal Roach, only to have Laurel meekly agreeing to Roach's demands.

Starting in October 1953, Laurel and Hardy spent eight months on tour. On arriving at Cobh in Ireland on 9 September 1953 and disembarking from the SS America they were given a warm welcome, and this is recreated in the final scene of the film. Following their opening night at the Palace Theatre, Plymouth on 17 May 1954, Hardy had a mild heart attack. Hardy stayed at the Grand Hotel in Plymouth while recovering. The pair sailed back to the United States on 2 June. The remainder of the tour was cancelled, and Laurel and Hardy never performed together on stage again. The character of Nobby Cook portrayed in the film is fictional. There was never a plan to continue the tour without Hardy, as Laurel would have refused to work with anyone else.

== Cast ==
- Steve Coogan as Stanley "Stan" Laurel
- John C. Reilly as Oliver "Ollie" Hardy
- Shirley Henderson as Lucille Hardy
- Nina Arianda as Ida Kitaeva Laurel
- Rufus Jones as Bernard Delfont
- Danny Huston as Hal Roach
- Joseph Balderrama as James W. Horne
- John Henshaw as Nobby Cook
- Keith MacPherson as James Finlayson
- Richard Cant as Harry Langdon
- Susy Kane as Cynthia Clarke, Harold Miffin's Head of Production

== Production ==
=== Development ===
A biopic about Laurel and Hardy titled Stan and Ollie and set during their final tour in 1953 was first announced in December 2013 as a television film that was to be a co-production between the Weinstein Company, BBC Comedy, BBC Worldwide and Lookout Point, with Jeff Pope announced as the screenwriter and Faye Ward joining as producer in August 2014. By January 2016, the film had transitioned to a theatrical feature film produced by BBC Films, Ward's Fable Pictures and Pope's Sonesta Films, with Steve Coogan and John C. Reilly announced as lined up to play the duo and Jon S. Baird hired as director; Entertainment One joined as co-financier the following month, handling international sales and distributing in countries where it directly operated. Pope described the comedy duo as being his "heroes". Pope took inspiration from Laurel and Hardy: The British Tours by A.J. Marriot, which also served as a research tool. Pope also spoke with Stan Laurel's great-granddaughter Cassidy Cook, who gave Pope access to the Laurel family archive.

=== Filming ===
Principal UK photography began in spring 2017. It took place at the Black Country Living Museum in Dudley, in the West Midlands of England, the Old Rep theatre Birmingham, the West London Film Studios, and Bristol in south-west England. Various locations along the Great Central Railway out of Loughborough in Leicestershire were used for the rail sequences and MV Balmoral (1949) for ship scenes. Part of the filming also took place in Worthing, West Sussex.

Filming hours were limited due to Reilly needing four hours in the makeup chair each day.

== Release ==
The film premiered at the closing night gala of the BFI London Film Festival on 21 October 2018 at the Cineworld, Leicester Square. While Entertainment One Films handled distribution in the United Kingdom, Canada, Australia, New Zealand, Spain and Benelux, Sony Pictures Classics were given the right to distribute the film in the United States, Latin America, Eastern Europe, China, and South Africa.

== Reception ==
=== Critical response ===
Following Stan & Ollie's October 2018 debut at the BFI London Film Festival, the film received positive reviews from critics. On review aggregator Rotten Tomatoes, the film holds an approval rating of 92% based on 221 reviews, with an average rating of 7.5/10. The website's critical consensus reads, "Stan & Ollie pays tribute to a pair of beloved entertainers with an affectionate look behind the scenes – and a moving look at the burdens and blessings of a creative bond." On Metacritic, the film has a weighted average score of 75 out of 100, based on 41 critics, indicating "generally favorable reviews".

Guy Lodge of Variety wrote: "Portraying Laurel and Hardy's final comic collaboration with bittersweet affection, Jon S. Baird's film is a laid-back, gamely performed tribute". Todd McCarthy of The Hollywood Reporter had high praise for the lead actors, saying: "Much of the time, you feel like you're beholding the real duo, so thoroughly conceived are the actors' physicality and performances". He concluded: "Everything the film has to offer is obvious and on the surface, its pleasures simple and sincere under the attentive guidance of director Jon S. Baird".

=== Accolades ===
Award	Date of ceremony	Category	Recipient(s)	Result	Ref(s)
Boston Society of Film Critics Awards	16 December 2018	Best Actor	John C. Reilly	Won	
British Academy Film Awards	10 February 2019	Best Actor in a Leading Role	Steve Coogan	Nominated	
British Academy Film Awards	10 February 2019	Outstanding British Film	Jon S. Baird, Faye Ward, Jeff Pope	Nominated	
British Academy Film Awards	10 February 2019	Best Makeup and Hair	Mark Coulier, Jeremy Woodhead, Josh Weston	Nominated	
British Independent Film Awards	2 December 2018	Best Actor	Steve Coogan	Nominated	
British Independent Film Awards	2 December 2018	Best Supporting Actress	Nina Arianda	Nominated	
British Independent Film Awards	2 December 2018	Best Casting	Andy Pryor	Nominated	
British Independent Film Awards	2 December 2018	Best Costume Design	Guy Speranza	Nominated	
British Independent Film Awards	2 December 2018	Best Make Up and Hair Design	Mark Coulier and Jeremy Woodhead	Nominated	
British Independent Film Awards	2 December 2018	Best Production Design	John Paul Kelly	Nominated	
British Independent Film Awards	2 December 2018	Breakthrough Producer	Faye Ward	Nominated	
Critics' Choice Movie Awards	13 January 2019	Best Actor in a Comedy	John C. Reilly	Nominated	
Golden Globe Awards	6 January 2019	Best Actor – Motion Picture Musical or Comedy	John C. Reilly	Nominated	
San Diego Film Critics Society Awards	10 December 2018	Best Supporting Actress	Nina Arianda	Runner-up	
San Diego Film Critics Society Awards	10 December 2018	Best Costume Design	Guy Speranza	Nominated	
San Diego Film Critics Society Awards	10 December 2018	Best Production Design	John Paul Kelly	Runner-up	
San Diego Film Critics Society Awards	10 December 2018	Best Body of Work	John C. Reilly (also for The Sisters Brothers & Ralph Breaks the Internet)	Won	
