= Ricochet Romance (film) =

1954 film

- Theatrical poster
- Directed by: Charles Lamont
- Written by: Kay Lenard
- Produced by: Robert Arthur; Richard Wilson
- Starring: Marjorie Main; Chill Wills; Alfonso Bedoya; Pedro Gonzalez Gonzalez; Rudy Vallee
- Cinematography: George Robinson
- Edited by: Frank Ware
- Music by: Joseph Gershenson
- Production company: Universal Pictures
- Distributed by: Universal Pictures
- Release date: November 1, 1954
- Running time: 80 minutes
- Country: United States
- Language: English

Ricochet Romance is a 1954 American western comedy film directed by Charles Lamont and starring Marjorie Main, Chill Wills and Alfonso Bedoya. It was produced and distributed by Universal Pictures. Its title is derived from the song of the same name, which is also featured in the film. It is also known as The Matchmakers.

== Cast ==
- Marjorie Main as Pansy Jones
- Chill Wills as Tom Williams
- Pedro Gonzalez Gonzalez as Manuel González
- Alfonso Bedoya as Alfredo González
- Rudy Vallee as Worthington Higgenmacher
- Ruth Hampton as Angela Ann Mansfield
- Benay Venuta as Claire Renard
- Rachel Ames as Betsy Williams
- Darryl Hickman as Dave King
- Lee Aaker as Timmy Williams
- Irene Ryan as Miss Clay
- Philip Tonge as Mr. Webster
- Phil Chambers as Mr. Daniels
- Charles Watts as Mr. Harvey
- Marjorie Bennett as Mrs. Harvey

== Release and reception ==
The film premiered in Los Angeles on October 27, 1954.

TV Guide awarded the film 3 out of 5 stars, saying: "The plot is ultra-thin, merely a frame to hang some mild slapstick routines on. This film is little different from Main's other amiable comedies."
