= J. David Stern =

American newspaper publisher (1886–1971)

Julius David Stern
- Born: April 1, 1886; Philadelphia, Pennsylvania, US
- Died: October 10, 1971 (aged 85); West Palm Beach, Florida
- Occupation: Newspaper publisher
- Known for: Owner and publisher of The Philadelphia Record (1928–47) and other newspapers
- Spouse: Juliet Lit
- Children: 4 including David Stern III
- Parent(s): Sophie Muhr Stern; David Stern

Julius David Stern (April 1, 1886 – October 10, 1971) was an American newspaper publisher, best known as the liberal Democratic publisher of The Philadelphia Record from 1928 to 1947. He published other newspapers including the New York Post which he bought in 1933 and owned until 1939.

== Early life ==
Stern was born to a Jewish family in Philadelphia in 1886, the son of Sophie (née Muhr) and David Stern. In 1902 he graduated from William Penn Charter School. He attended the University of Pennsylvania for undergraduate work (1906) and law school (1909).

== Career ==
Stern got his start in the newspaper field in 1908 with a reporter position at the Philadelphia Public Ledger. Within three years he had moved on to become general manager of the Providence News. At age 25 he purchased the New Brunswick, New Jersey Times for $2,500, and later sold it for $25,000. In 1914 or 1915 he moved to Springfield, Illinois where he acquired and combined the city's two evening papers, subsequently selling the combined operation to the owners of the morning papers.

In 1919 Stern purchased the Camden, New Jersey Morning Courier. In 1926 he acquired the Camden Morning Post and combined the two to create the Courier-Post. And in June 1928, after the death of publisher Rodman Wanamaker, Stern purchased The Philadelphia Record with the help of $2.5 million loan from businessman Albert M. Greenfield. During the 1930s, disputes between Stern and Moses Annenberg, publisher of The Philadelphia Inquirer, became a "publisher's war".

Late in 1933, Stern acquired the New York Post, then known as the New York Evening Post until he removed the "Evening" from its name. He sold the Post to Dorothy Schiff and her husband George Backer in 1939.

Stern was the director of the Federal Reserve Bank of Philadelphia during 1935 and 1936, and he served the U.S. War Production Board on its printing and publishing advisory board.

In July 1940, Stern bought radio station WHAT in Philadelphia for a reported $10,000.

Stern was an early supporter of labor, and in 1934 the first to enter into a collective bargaining agreement with his editorial staff. He was forced to shut down the Record and sell all his holdings (including radio station WCAU and two Camden newspapers) to the Philadelphia Bulletin after a strike by the American Newspaper Guild against his papers in 1947. Stern announced publicly that he had made a "grave mistake in recognizing the Guild".

Politically Stern was a liberal Democrat. He supported Al Smith in the 1928 Presidential Election and gave early support to Franklin D. Roosevelt.

== Other work ==
Stern wrote a science fiction novel published in 1952, Eidolon: A Philosophical Phantasy Built on a Syllogism. The New York Times recalled it as "Eldoion, dealing with newspapers, science and religion". He also wrote an autobiography published in 1962, Memoirs of a Maverick Publisher.

== Personal ==
Long retired from the newspaper business and living in Florida, Stern died on October 10, 1971, at age 85 in West Palm Beach, Florida. He was survived by his wife, Juliet (Lit) Stern, and two sons and two daughters. Their son David Stern III, also in the newspaper business, was the creator of Francis the Talking Mule.
