= Francis in the Navy =

1955 film by Arthur Lubin

- Theatrical release half-sheet display poster
- Directed by: Arthur Lubin
- Written by: Devery Freeman; David Stern
- Produced by: Stanley Rubin
- Starring: Donald O'Connor; Martha Hyer
- Cinematography: Carl E. Guthrie
- Edited by: Milton Carruth; Ray Snyder
- Music by: Irving Gertz (uncredited); William Lava (uncredited)
- Production company: Universal Pictures
- Distributed by: Universal-International
- Release date: August 24, 1955
- Running time: 80 minutes
- Country: United States
- Language: English

Francis in the Navy is a 1955 American black-and-white comedy film from Universal-International, produced by Stanley Rubin and directed by Arthur Lubin. The film stars Donald O'Connor and Martha Hyer, and marked the first credited film role of Clint Eastwood. The distinctive voice of Francis is a voice-over by actor Chill Wills.

This is the sixth film in Universal-International Francis the Talking Mule series.

== Plot ==
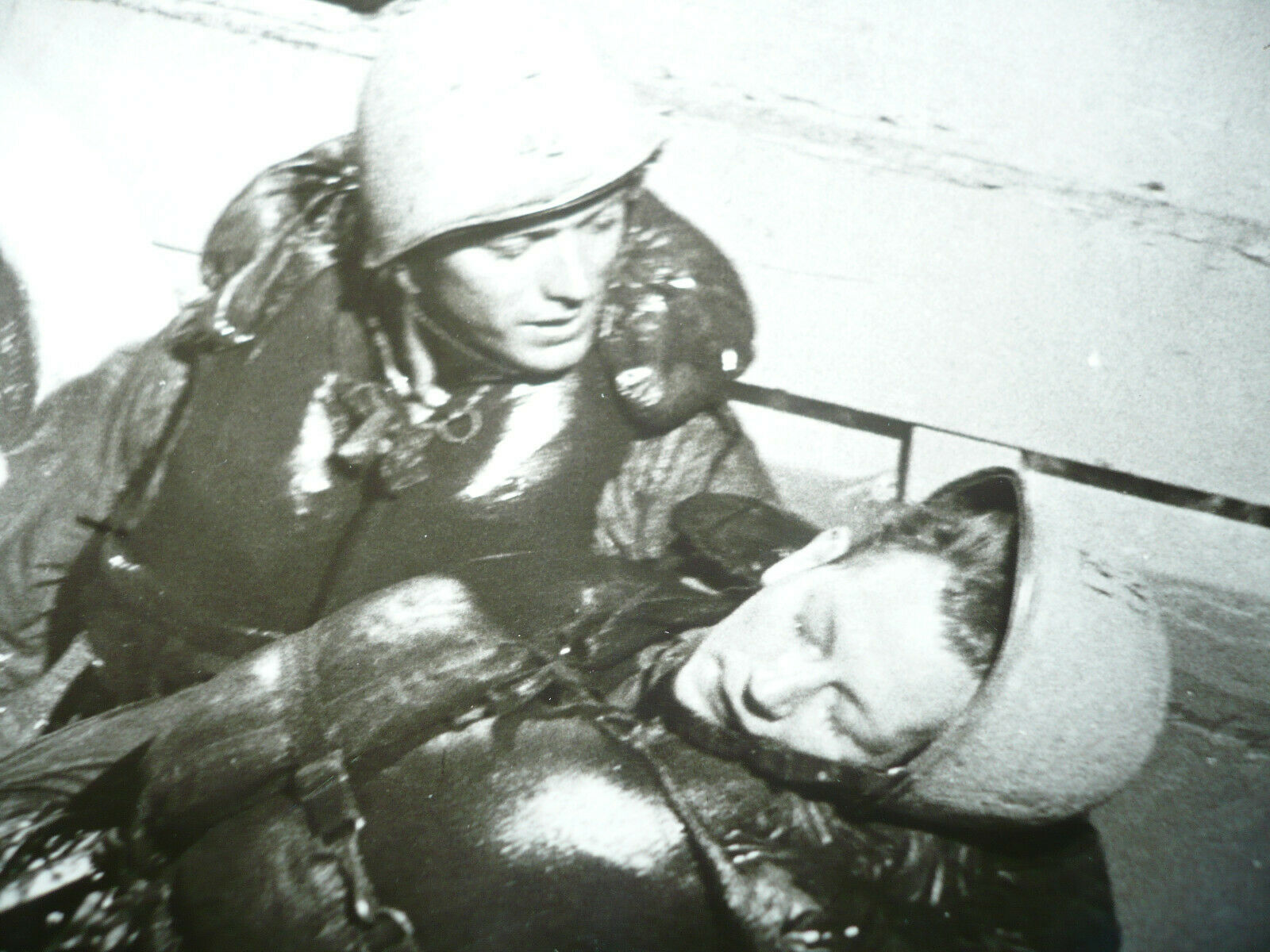
Clint Eastwood and Donald O'Connor in Francis in the Navy

U.S. Army officer Lt. Peter Sterling gets mistaken for his lookalike in the U.S. Navy, Bosun's Mate 'Slicker' Donevan, and as a result gets promptly shipped to Donevan's base. With his old pal Francis, Sterling continues his military career misadventures, this time in the Navy.

Getting word that Francis is about to be sold at auction, Sterling arrives at the Coronado base to bid for him---but is pickpocketed and must watch the Navy buy Francis as a lab test animal. Slicker Donevan is AWOL and the MP's waste no time arresting Peter. Peter's insistence they have the wrong man lands him the psychiatric ward, despite pleas to the base's semi-addled Commander Hutch. Francis advises that to gain his freedom, Peter must pretend to be Slicker. This is fine as far as it goes. But Slicker is regarded as a champion athlete, and Peter has to take part in a boxing exhibition against the bruiser Bull Bostwick. Peter is knocked out, despite Francis' effort to fix the fight (ringing the bell gong at odd times; greasing the opponent's shoes, etc.).

Peter is interested in pretty nurse Betsy, only to find out she is "his" sister.

Slicker is having too much fun with the situation and in a series of double-exposed scenes; refuses to help Peter. But when a huge Army vs. Navy war games exercise is announced, Slicker decides to call it off so he can get back on the Navy team. But the day of the Games, Slicker is out cold in the infirmary (thanks to Peter's clumsiness).

Peter's task is to drive a DUCK (amphibious vehicle) to a pre-arranged spot as a "vital supply delivery". Thanks to a heavy fog, they beach miles from the actual spot---and must drive highways around a mountain range. A traffic jam costs Peter his two shipmates, and then he runs out of gas. A service station attendant refuses to provide patriotic free gas. So Francis kicks and breaks a pump. The leaking gas must be preserved, even if it ends up in Peter's vehicle.

When the DUCK arrives, Francis is the only passenger. The Top Brass unanimously decide never to mention the incident.

Mistaken identities are straightened out with the top brass, but not the ever-present MP's. Peter must spend his train ride home hiding in the baggage car with Francis.

== Cast ==
- Donald O'Connor as Peter Stirling/Bosun's Mate 'Slicker' Donevan
- Martha Hyer as Betsy Donevan
- Richard Erdman as Murph
- Jim Backus as Commander E.T. Hutch
- Clint Eastwood as Jonesy
- David Janssen as Lieutenant Anders
- Leigh Snowden as Nurse Appleby
- Martin Milner as W.T. 'Rick' Rickson
- Paul Burke as Tate
- Myrna Hansen as Helen
- Phil Garris as Tony Stover
- Virginia O'Brien as Nurse
- Dick Wessel as Gas Station Attendant (uncredited)
- Carl(ALFALFA) Switzer as Boxing Match Timekeeper(uncredited)
- David Thursby as Pawnbroker( uncredited)
- Harvey Perry as Bull Bostwick, boxer (uncredited)
- James Craven as Lab Scientist (uncredited)
- Walter Woolf King as Jensen (uncredited)
- Kenneth Mac Donald as Motorcycle Cop (uncredited)
- Henry Kulky as Rival Bidder at Auction (uncredited)

== Production ==
Donald O'Connor was reluctant to make the film but agreed to do one more at the request of his daughter (in addition to a "financial inducement" from Universal studio head Edward Muhl). Lubin said O'Connor "got a little bored with it [the Francis series], on the last one. He got very difficult and was not very pleasant to work with."

It was once known as Francis Weighs Anchor and started filming February 15, 1955.

The film was partially shot at the U. S. Navy base in Coronado California, not far from downtown San Diego.

Stanley Rubin was producer on the film.

== See also ==
- List of American films of 1955
- List of media set in San Diego
