= Henry Cuyler Bunner =

American novelist, journalist and poet (1855–1896)

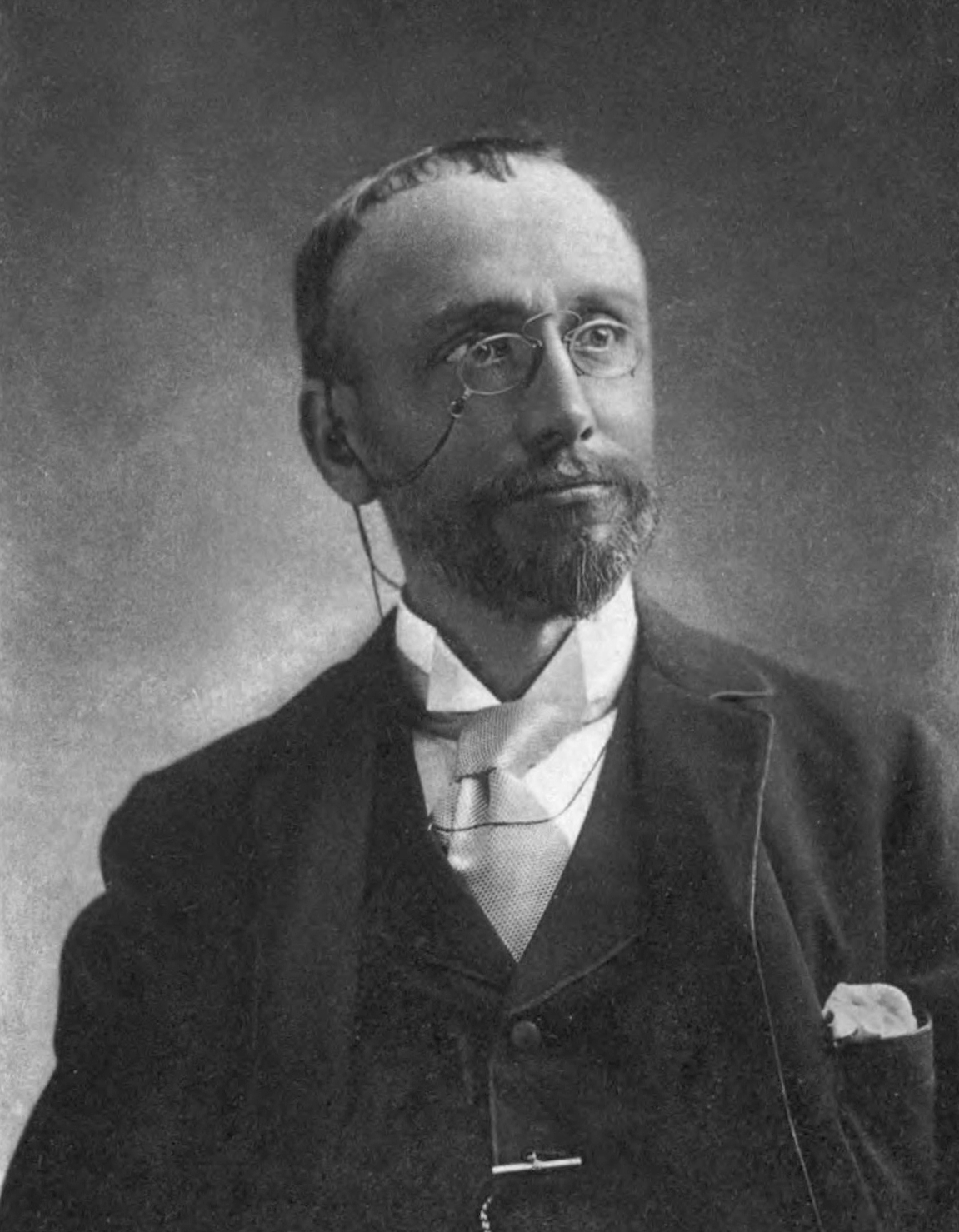
- Born: August 3, 1855; Oswego, New York, United states of America
- Died: May 11, 1896 (aged 40); Nutley, New Jersey, U.S.
- Occupations: Poet; novelist; journalist
- Spouse: Alice Learned
- Writing career
- Notable works: Zenobia's Infidelity; The Tower of Babel

Henry Cuyler Bunner (August 3, 1855 – May 11, 1896) was an American novelist, journalist and poet. He is known mainly for Tower of Babel.

Bunner's works have been praised by librarians for their "technical dexterity, playfulness and smoothness of finish".

== Biography ==
Bunner was born on August 3, 1855, in Oswego, New York, to Rudolph Bunner Jr. (1813–1875) and Ruth Keating Tuckerman (1821–1896) and was educated in New York City. His paternal grandparents were Rudolph Bunner (1779–1837) and Elizabeth Church (1783–1867), the daughter of John Barker Church (1748–1818) and Angelica Schuyler (1756–1814).

From being a clerk in an importing house, he turned to journalism, and after some work as a reporter, and on the staff of the Arcadian (1873), he became in 1877 assistant editor of the comic weekly Puck. He soon assumed the editorship, which he held until his death. He developed Puck from a new struggling periodical into a powerful social and political organ.

In 1886, he published a novel, The Midge, followed in 1887 by The Story of a New York House. Other efforts in fiction were his short stories and sketches: "Short Sixes" (1891), "More Short Sixes" (1894), "Made in France" (1893), Zadoc Pine and Other Stories (1891), Love in Old Cloathes and Other Stories (1896), and "Jersey Street and Jersey Lane" (1896). Among his poetic works Airs from Arcady and Elsewhere, published in 1884 and including one of his best known poems, "The Way to Arcady"; Rowen (1892), and Poems (1896), edited by his friend Brander Matthews and displaying a light play of imagination and a delicate workmanship. He also wrote clever vers de société and parodies. One of his several plays (usually written in collaboration) was The Tower of Babel (1883).

His short story "Zenobia's Infidelity" was made into a feature film called Zenobia starring Oliver Hardy and Harry Langdon by the Hal Roach Studio in 1939.

== Personal life ==
Bunner married Alice Learned (1863–1952), daughter of Joshua Coit Learned (1819–1892), and granddaughter of Joshua Coit (1758–1798), U.S. Representative from Connecticut. Together, they had:

- Rudolph Bunner (1887–1888)
- Ruth Tuckerman Bunner (1890–1946), who married Harold Edwin Dimock (1884–1967) in 1917, brother of Edith Dimock (1876–1955), the artist.
- Philip Schuyler Bunner (1892–1892)
- Laurence H. Bunner (1894–1974)

Bunner died on May 11, 1896, in Nutley, New Jersey.
