= Francis (film) =

1950 film by Arthur Lubin

- Theatrical release half-sheet display poster
- Directed by: Arthur Lubin
- Screenplay by: David Stern III; Dorothy Reid (uncredited)
- Based on: Francis; 1946 novel by David Stern
- Produced by: Robert Arthur
- Starring: Donald O'Connor; Patricia Medina; ZaSu Pitts; Ray Collins; John McIntire; Chill Wills
- Cinematography: Irving Glassberg
- Edited by: Milton Carruth
- Music by: Frank Skinner; Walter Scharf
- Production company: Universal Pictures
- Distributed by: Universal-International
- Release dates: February 8, 1950 (New Orleans); March 15, 1950 (New York)
- Running time: 91 minutes
- Country: United States
- Language: English
- Budget: $622,000
- Box office: $2.9 million (US rentals)

Francis is a 1950 American comedy film produced and distributed by Universal-International that launched the Francis the Talking Mule film series. The film was produced by Robert Arthur and directed by Arthur Lubin. It stars Donald O'Connor and Patricia Medina, with the distinctive voice of Francis provided by actor Chill Wills.

Six Francis sequels from Universal followed the film, all but one starring O'Connor; Mickey Rooney replaced O'Connor in the final film of the series.

== Plot ==
A bank manager speaks with teller Peter Stirling, who has been attracting public attention, and Stirling relates his story in a flashback.

Stirling, a second lieutenant, is caught behind Japanese lines in Burma during World War II. A talking Army mule named Francis carries him to safety. Stirling later insists that the mule had rescued him, so he is placed in a psychiatric ward. Francis helps Stirling thwart enemy plans twice, and each time Stirling is returned to the psychiatric ward when he insists on crediting Francis. In an effort to obtain his release, Stirling asks three-star general Stevens to order Francis to speak, but Francis does not obey until it becomes clear that Stirling will be arrested for treason if he remains silent. Stevens is convinced and orders Stirling's release.

During one of his hospital stays, Stirling is befriended by Maureen Gelder, a beautiful French refugee. He grows to trust her and tells her about Francis. Later, a propaganda radio broadcast from Tokyo Rose mocks the Allies for being advised by a mule, leading to the suspicion that Stirling or Gelder is a Japanese agent. The press is later informed that the absurd mule story was concocted to identify the spy. With help from Francis, the real culprit is identified as Gelder.

Francis is shipped to the U.S. for further study, but his military transport crashes in the wilderness of Kentucky. Stirling searches for him after the war and finds him alive and well.

== Cast ==
- Donald O'Connor as Peter Stirling
- Patricia Medina as Maureen Gelder
- Chill Wills as Francis the talking mule (voice)
- ZaSu Pitts as Nurse Valerie Humpert
- Ray Collins as Colonel Hooker
- John McIntire as General Stevens (as John McIntyre)
- Eduard Franz as Colonel Plepper
- Howland Chamberlain as Major Nadel
- James Todd as Colonel Saunders
- Robert Warwick as Colonel Carmichael
- Frank Faylen as Sergeant Chillingbacker
- Tony Curtis as Captain Jones (as Anthony Curtis)
- Mikel Conrad as Major Garber
- Loren Tindell as Major Richards
- Charles Meredith as Munroe, the banker

== Production ==
=== Development ===
Director Arthur Lubin became attached to the film in March 1948. He was attracted to the light material because "as a movie fan myself, I am tired of watching neurotic material on the screen. I can easily skip the latest psychiatric spell binders, but I've seen Miracle on 34th Street a half dozen times."

In September 1948, it was announced that Robert Stillman, Joseph H. Nadel and Lubin had purchased the film rights from David Stern, with Stillman to produce and Lubin to direct. Lubin took the film to Universal, which had a commitment to Donald O'Connor for $30,000 and was looking to produce something inexpensive. The studio advanced Lubin $10,000 as a test to determine whether he could create the illusion of the mule speaking. The test was successful and Universal agreed to finance the film as a starring vehicle for Donald O'Connor. Lubin worked on the script with Stern, and Dorothy Davenport Reid contributed to the screenplay but was not credited within the film.

Universal records show that Lubin was paid a flat fee of $25,000.

=== Shooting ===
Filming started on May 7, 1949 and continued until June. Parts of the film were shot at the Conejo Valley Airport in Thousand Oaks, California.

Producer Robert Arthur said that the film was budgeted at $580,000 but finished $42,000 over budget. Lubin later claimed that the film had cost $150,000 and said: "Donald got $30,000 at the time, the mule cost nothing. We had three mules then. And we made that picture in fifteen days."

== Reception ==
Francis was first shown in January 1950 to Army troops stationed in West Germany. Its premiere was held in New Orleans on February 8, 1950.

In a contemporary review for The New York Times, critic Bosley Crowther wrote: "[T]he whole gist and jesting of this farce are in an unsubtle demonstration that the mule is less of a jackass than is man—or, at least, than are men in the Army, in any eschelon [sic] above that of sergeant, especially second lieutenants and three-star 'brass.' And since this is an opinion to which millions of veterans will subscribe, the essential idea of 'Francis' is sure to be widely popular. Likewise its demonstration, for all its reliance on burlesque, is not beneath the mild appreciation of those who would have a good low laugh. ... Indeed, there are so many droll bits in 'Francis' that we hate to observe that it moves in a pretty small circle around one strictly fantastic joke and that it tends, in its limited revolutions, not only to repeat but to grow dull. Mr. Stern, with a very cute idea, has not endowed it with any real wit above the level of joke-book humor, which usually palls after the third time around. ... In short, we can't say that 'Francis' ... offers comedy of rich and subtle nature. But it holds a few good laughs—especially for mules."

The film was the 11th-most successful hit of the year in the U.S. In May 1950, Universal-International purchased all rights to the character Francis from author David Stern, including the right to produce an unlimited number of Francis the Talking Mule sequels.

Lubin soon became associated with films featuring animal characters having human traits. He was approached with ideas for a talking Navy goat, an Abbott and Costello film with chimpanzees and a talking goose. He later directed Rhubarb (1951), a film about a cat who owns a baseball team, and the Francis sequel films, and he developed the popular television sitcom Mister Ed, featuring a talking horse.

== Home media ==
Francis was released in 1978 as one of the first titles in the LaserDisc format (Discovision Catalog #22-003). It was then reissued on LaserDisc in May 1994 by MCA/Universal Home Video (Catalog #42024) as part of an Encore Edition Double Feature with Francis Goes to the Races (1951).

The first four Francis films were released in 2004 by Universal Pictures on Region 1 and Region 4 DVD as The Adventures of Francis the Talking Mule Vol. 1. Universal released all seven Francis films as a set on three Region 1 and Region 4 DVDs as Francis the Talking Mule: The Complete Collection.
