= One More Train to Rob =

1971 film

- Theatrical release poster
- Directed by: Andrew McLaglen
- Screenplay by: Don Tait; Dick Nelson
- Story by: William Roberts
- Produced by: Robert Arthur
- Starring: George Peppard; Diana Muldaur; John Vernon; France Nuyen
- Cinematography: Alric Edens
- Edited by: Robert L. Simpson
- Music by: David Shire
- Color process: Technicolor
- Production company: Universal Pictures
- Distributed by: Universal Pictures
- Release date: February 19, 1971
- Running time: 108 minutes
- Country: United States
- Language: English

One More Train to Rob is a 1971 American comedy Western film directed by Andrew McLaglen, starring George Peppard, and featuring Diana Muldaur, John Vernon and France Nuyen.

The shooting title for the film was Hark. It was one of a number of medium budgeted genre films Peppard made around this time. McLaglen called it "just an okay movie. It's played an awful lot on TV, but it isn't my favourite by a long shot."

== Plot ==
Train-robber Harker Fleet, set up by his former partner, Timothy Xavier Nolan, is sent to prison for assaulting a sheriff and his deputy while trying to escape a forced marriage. Fleet serves his time, but gets out of prison early, for good behavior. Once he is released from prison, he travels to the town of Calador, intending to settle the score with Nolan for railroading him and stealing his woman, Katy.

== Cast ==
- George Peppard as Harker Fleet
- Diana Muldaur as Katy
- John Vernon as Timothy Xavier Nolan
- France Nuyen as Ah Toy
- Soon-Tek Oh as Yung
- Steve Sandor as Jim Gant
- Pamela McMyler as Cora Mae Jones
- Richard Loo as Mr. Chang
- Robert Donner as Sheriff Adams
- John Doucette as Sheriff Monte
- C.K. Yang as Wong
- Marie Windsor as Louella
- Timothy Scott as Slim
- Joan Shawlee as Big Nellie
- Hal Needham as Bert Gant
- Harry Carey, Jr. as Red

== Production ==
George Peppard called his character Harker Fleet "a likable type of guy. I wanted to play the role a long time before the film was made." He originally became attached in 1969. It was going to be filmed that year with Tisha Sterling but the filming location was frozen. Then he was going to film it again but this was delayed when a new producer was put in charge. Peppard ultimately helped choose the music and suggested three violent deaths in the original script be deleted.

"There's a lot of fun in this picture," he said. "We made it before Butch Cassidy and the Sundance Kid but it has the same sense of fun."

Filming started 9 March 1970 under the name Hark. Gayle Hunnicutt was going to play the female lead Katy but Diana Muldaur played it instead. France Nuyen played the role of Ah Toy, her first film after a seven year absence.

The movie was then retitled The Last Bullet. Peppard disliked the title which he said "sounds like a 1942 Western" and was unhappy with the original ad campaign which he said played the film too straight. Peppard offered to promote the film for free if the film's title and campaign were changed. Peppard had proposed H. Fleet, Robber as an alternative title and for a time this was used. Eventually One More Train to Rob was reached as a compromise.

== Reception ==
Variety called it "a sometimes tongue-in-cheek, bawdy, fast-shootin' western with comedic overtones that should fit handily in the general action market. What marks Robert Arthur production particularly is the slick performance by George Peppard in what production notes observes as the "anti-hero." Enough novelty is inserted both in story line and character development to keep audiences engaged."

Andrew V. McLaglen's biographer wrote "though One More Train to Rob is scored with violence and tragedy — the plight of the trapped prostitute, in particular — it ranks as one of McLaglen's more overtly comic pictures. Much of the picture's humor arises from Hark's mannerisms, especially the pleasure he takes in being a train robber."

== See also ==
- List of American films of 1971
