= David Stern III =

American newspaper publisher, prose fiction and script writer (1909–2003)

David Stern III (September 2, 1909 – November 22, 2003), also known as David J. Stern was an American prose fiction writer and scriptwriter, sometimes under the name Peter Stirling—that of the human lead opposite his most famous character, Francis the Talking Mule. He was the publisher of a New Orleans newspaper for a time, and was the son of a much more prominent newspaper publisher, J. David Stern.

== Biography ==
During World War II, Stern became a captain in the US Army working on military newspapers. During this time he had an idea to write about a talking mule and published Francis in 1946. The Francis the Talking Mule books later became a film series, though his 1948 sequel Francis Goes to Washington was never filmed.

In 1949, he purchased the New Orleans Item-Tribune for $2,000,000. He ran the paper until its 1958 merger with the Daily States newspaper.

In 1958, the Item-Tribune merged with the Daily States (founded in 1880) to form the New Orleans Daily States-Item. In 1962, the publisher and businessman Samuel I. Newhouse bought the morning Times-Picayune as well as the afternoon States-Item, which continued to be published separately until they were merged and combined in 1980.
