= A.J. Marriot =

British writer

A. J. Marriot
- Born: Alan Johnson; 1950 (age 75–76)
- Occupations: Writer, comedian, comedy writer
- Notable work: Laurel and Hardy: The British Tours, Laurel and Hardy: The European Tours, Laurel: Stage by Stage, Chaplin: Stage by Stage

A. J. Marriot is the pen name of Alan Johnson (born 1950), a British writer known for his detailed biographies of Laurel and Hardy and Charlie Chaplin. His book Laurel and Hardy: The British Tours was adapted by screenwriter Jeff Pope into the 2018 film Stan and Ollie starring Steve Coogan and John C. Reilly.

== Career ==
Marriot grew up in Atherton, England and began his career as a comedian and comedy writer, providing material for Gary Wilmot, Russ Abbot and Brian Conley. His scripts were used in comedy routines featured on television shows including Live from the Palladium and Summertime Special.

He then began writing biographies of Laurel and Hardy, undertaking painstaking research to catalogue every live appearance made by the comedy duo.

== Books ==
- Laurel and Hardy: The British Tours
- Laurel and Hardy: The European Tours
- Laurel: Stage by Stage
- Chaplin: Stage by Stage
