= Way Out West (1937 film) =

1937 film by James W. Horne

- Theatrical release poster
- Directed by: James W. Horne
- Written by: Contributing (uncredited): Stan Laurel; James W. Horne; Arthur V. Jones
- Screenplay by: Charley Rogers; Felix Adler; James Parrott
- Story by: Jack Jevne; Charley Rogers
- Produced by: Stan Laurel; Hal Roach
- Starring: Stan Laurel; Oliver Hardy
- Cinematography: Art Lloyd; Walter Lundin
- Edited by: Bert Jordan
- Music by: Marvin Hatley
- Production company: Hal Roach Studios
- Distributed by: Metro-Goldwyn-Mayer
- Release date: April 16, 1937 (U.S.)
- Running time: 63 minutes
- Country: United States
- Language: English

Way Out West is a 1937 Laurel and Hardy comedy film directed by James W. Horne, produced by Stan Laurel, and distributed by Metro-Goldwyn-Mayer. It was the second picture for which Stan Laurel was credited as producer.

== Plot ==
Laurel and Hardy embark on a quest to locate Mary Roberts, the rightful heir to a substantial inheritance, including a gold mine deed, following news of her father's demise. Discovering Mary amidst the West's cabaret milieu, they encounter formidable obstacles in the form of her legal guardians, indifferent to her well-being and intent on usurping her wealth.

Their journey to Brushwood Gulch is beset with misfortune, from Ollie's mishap in a river sinkhole to their encounter with the stern sheriff and his wife. At Mickey Finn's saloon, a case of mistaken identity leads to the theft of Mary's deed by the unscrupulous Finns, triggering a frantic pursuit.

In a daring nighttime endeavor, Laurel and Hardy orchestrate a break-in to retrieve the deed, facing numerous obstacles. Their efforts culminate in a showdown with the Finns, wherein Ollie's improvised coercion secures the deed's return. With Mary in tow, they escape, leaving the Finns confined to their own establishment.

== Cast ==
Credited:

- Stan Laurel as Stanley
- Oliver Hardy as Ollie
- Sharon Lynn as Lola Marcel
- James Finlayson as Mickey Finn
- Rosina Lawrence as Mary Roberts
- Stanley Fields as Sheriff
- Vivien Oakland as Sheriff's wife
- The Avalon Boys as themselves
- Laughing Gravy as Dog in saloon
- Dinah the mule as herself

Uncredited:

- Harry Bernard as man eating at bar
- Flora Finch as Maw
- Mary Gordon as Cook
- Jack Hill as Finn's employee
- Sam Lufkin as stagecoach baggage handler
- Fred Toones as Janitor
- May Wallace as Cook
- James C. Morton as Bartender

== Reception ==
=== Critical response ===
Pauline Kael praised the film: "This satire of Westerns is probably Laurel and Hardy's most comically sustained feature ... They do a classic soft-shoe shuffle outside a saloon; Hardy's lolling elephantine grace has never been more ingratiating ... The film is leisurely in the best sense; you adjust to a different rhythm and come out feeling relaxed, as if you'd gone on vacation." Leonard Maltin gave it three and a half of four stars: "One of their best features ... Another bonus: some charming musical interludes, and the boys perform a wonderful soft-shoe dance." Leslie Halliwell gave it one of his rare four of four stars: "Seven reels of perfect joy, with the comedians at their very best in brilliantly-timed routines ... "

== Soundtrack ==
The film's score was composed by Marvin Hatley and nominated for an Academy Award for Best Music (Scoring). The film includes two well-known songs: firstly J. Leubrie Hill's "At the Ball, That's All", sung by the Avalon Boys and accompanied by Laurel and Hardy performing an extended dance routine, one that they rehearsed endlessly, and secondly Macdonald and Carroll's "Trail of the Lonesome Pine", sung by Laurel and Hardy (except for a few lines by Chill Wills and Rosina Lawrence, lip-synched for comedic effect by Laurel).

"Trail of the Lonesome Pine" was released as a single in Britain in 1975, backed by "Honolulu Baby" from Sons of the Desert; it reached number 2 in the British charts.

== In popular culture ==
- Way Out West is referenced in the 1979 film The Sheriff and the Satellite Kid when the Sheriff (Bud Spencer) ends up replicating Stan Laurel's thumb fire trick featured in the film.
- The opening scene of the 2018 biopic Stan & Ollie depicts a shooting of the film, with Laurel and Hardy arriving on the set for one of the dance scenes.
- The original BBC version of "Song of Summer", Ken Russell's 1968 biopic of Frederick Delius, begins with Eric Fenby (Christopher Gable) anachronistically playing cinema organ accompaniment to a silent showing of the "Commence to Dancin'" dance episode. It was cut from the 2001 DVD release, as permission could not be obtained to use it.
