= Donald O'Connor =

American film actor (1925–2003)

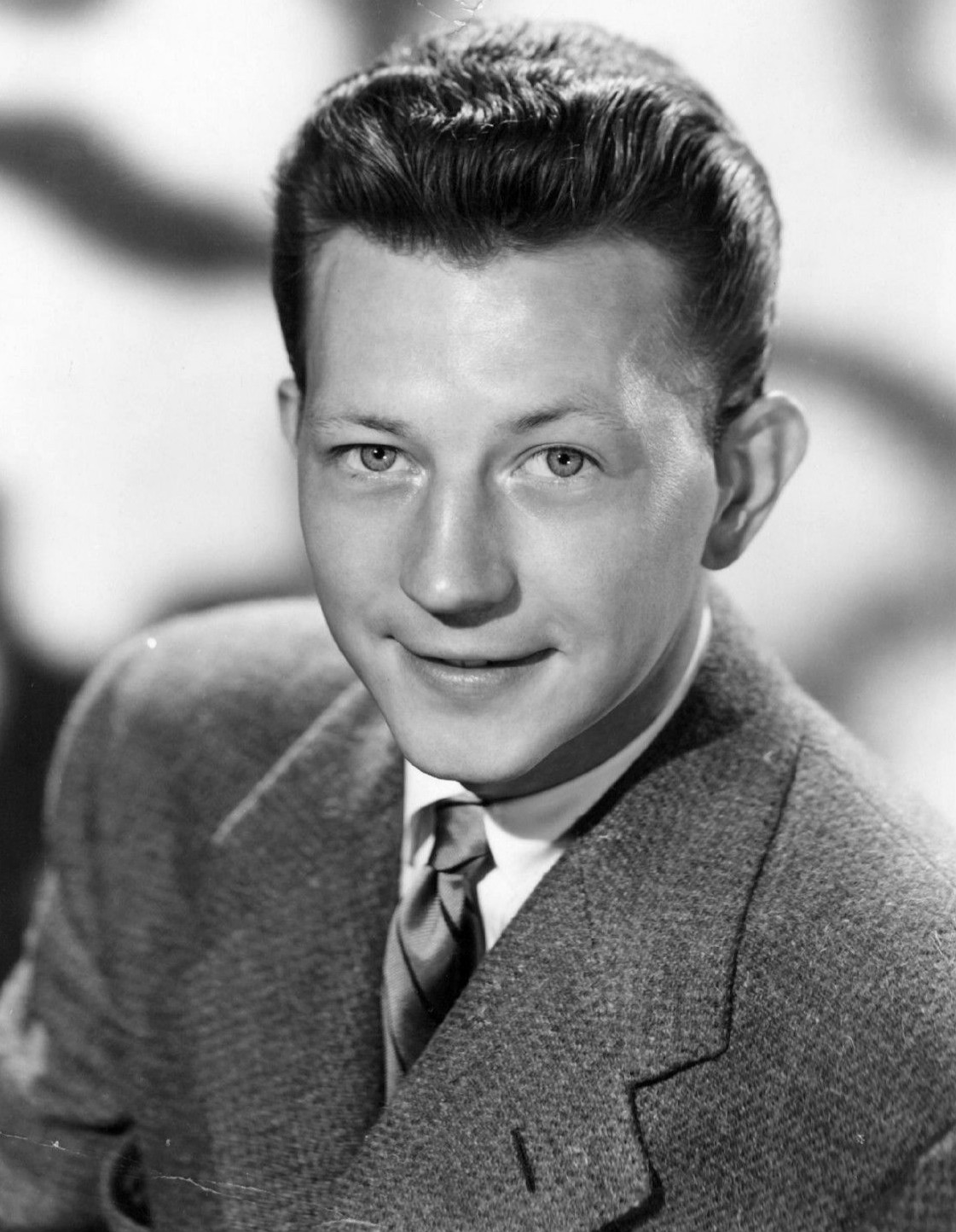
- O'Connor in 1952
- Born: Donald David Dixon Ronald O'Connor; August 28, 1925; Chicago, Illinois, U.S.
- Died: September 27, 2003 (aged 78); Los Angeles, California, U.S.
- Occupations: Dancer; singer; actor
- Years active: 1932–1999
- Spouses: Gwen Carter (m. 1944; div. 1954) Gloria Noble (m. 1956)
- Children: 4

Donald David Dixon Ronald O'Connor (August 28, 1925 – September 27, 2003) was an American dancer, singer and actor. He came to fame in a series of films in which he co-starred, in succession, with Gloria Jean, Peggy Ryan, and Francis the Talking Mule.

O'Connor was born into a vaudeville family, where he learned to dance, sing, play comedy, and perform slapstick. The most distinctive characteristic of his dancing style was its athleticism, for which he had few rivals. Yet it was his boyish charm that audiences found most engaging, and which remained an appealing aspect of his personality throughout his career. In his Universal musicals of the early 1940s, O'Connor was a wisecracking, fast-talking teenager, much like Mickey Rooney of Metro-Goldwyn-Mayer (MGM). But by 1952 and Singin' in the Rain, MGM had cultivated a much more sympathetic sidekick persona for him, and that remained O'Connor's signature image.

His best-known work was his "Make 'Em Laugh" dance routine in Singin' in the Rain (1952), for which O'Connor was awarded a Golden Globe. He also won a Primetime Emmy Award from four nominations and received two stars on the Hollywood Walk of Fame.

== Early years ==
O'Connor was born on August 28, 1925 in Chicago to Vaudevillians Edward "Chuck" O'Connor and Effie Irene (née Crane), the 200th child born at St. Elizabeth Hospital there. Both the O'Connors struggled to remember where and when exactly Donald was born, due to the family's extensive travel. Effie was a bareback rider and Chuck was a circus strongman and acrobat. His father's family was from Ireland.

O'Connor later said, "I was about 13 months old, they tell me, when I first started dancing, and they'd hold me up by the back of my neck and they'd start the music, and I'd dance. You could do that with any kid, only I got paid for it."

When O'Connor was only two years old, he and his seven-year-old sister, Arlene, were hit by a car while crossing the street outside a theater in Hartford, Connecticut; Donald survived, but his sister died. A few weeks later, his father died of a heart attack while dancing on stage in Brockton, Massachusetts.

O'Connor's mother was extremely possessive of her youngest son due to these traumas, not allowing him to cross the street on his own until he turned 13. Effie also stopped O'Connor from learning hazardous dance routines, and made sure she always knew where he was when he was not performing.

== Career ==
=== O'Connor Family ===
O'Connor joined a dance act with his mother and elder brother Jack. They were billed as the O'Connor Family, the Royal Family of Vaudeville. They toured the country doing singing, dancing, comedy, and acting. "Our entire family composed an act," he says. "We really didn't have a choice; if you were in the family you appeared in the act. I loved vaudeville. The live audiences created a certain spontaneity."

When they were not touring they stayed with O'Connor's Uncle Bill in Danville, Illinois. O'Connor never went to school, but performed in the Danville High School dramatic club with Dick Van Dyke and Bobby Short.

He later said, "I learned two dance routines. I looked like the world's greatest dancer. I did triple wings and everything. But I had never had any formal training. So, when I went into movies and started working with all those great dancers, I had a terrible time. I couldn't pick up routines because I didn't have any formal training. At the age of 15 — from 15 on, I really had to learn to dance. And that's quite old for someone to start dancing real heavy, professionally."

Contrasting the vaudevillian style of dance with that of ballet and musicals he observed, "All hoofers, they dance from the waist down. And I had to learn to dance from the waist up. And then, I became what's known as a total dancer."

O'Connor began performing in movies in 1937, making his debut at age 11 in Melody for Two appearing with his family act. He was also in Columbia's It Can't Last Forever (1937).

=== Paramount ===
O'Connor signed a contract at Paramount Studios. He appeared in Men with Wings (1938), directed by William Wellman, as Fred MacMurray's character as a boy. He was billed fifth in Sing You Sinners (1938) playing Bing Crosby's and MacMurray's younger brother.

He was in Sons of the Legion (1938), then had the second lead in a B-picture, Tom Sawyer, Detective (1938), playing Huckleberry Finn opposite Billy Cook's Tom Sawyer. O'Connor third billed in both Boy Trouble (1939) and Unmarried (1939), playing John Hartley as a young boy in the latter.

O'Connor was billed fourth in Million Dollar Legs (1939) with Betty Grable. He played Gary Cooper as a young boy in Beau Geste (1939), directed by Wellman.

Night Work (1939) was a sequel to Boy Trouble and O'Connor was in Death of a Champion (1939).

He went to Warner Bros to play Eddie Albert as a young boy in On Your Toes (1939). He then returned to his family act in vaudeville for two years.

=== Universal ===
In 1941, O'Connor signed with Universal Pictures for $200 a week, where he began with What's Cookin'? (1942), a low-budget musical with The Andrews Sisters, the studio's teenage singing star Gloria Jean, and Peggy Ryan. The film was popular and Universal began to develop O'Connor and Ryan as their version of Mickey Rooney and Judy Garland.

He, Ryan, and the Andrews Sisters were in Private Buckaroo (1942) and Give Out, Sisters (1942); then he was co-starred opposite Jean in four films: Get Hep to Love (1942), When Johnny Comes Marching Home (1943), It Comes Up Love (1943), and School for Jive, which showed O'Connor to such good advantage that he became the focal point of the film, retitled Mister Big (1943). Universal added $50,000 to the budget and elevated the "B" movie to "A" status.

O'Connor and Ryan were in Top Man (1943), with Susanna Foster, and Chip Off the Old Block (1944), with Ann Blyth. O'Connor and Ryan both had cameos in Universal's all-star Follow the Boys (1944).

During World War II, on his 18th birthday in August 1943, O'Connor was drafted into the United States Army. Before he reported for induction on February 6, 1944, Universal already had four O'Connor films completed. They rushed production to complete four more by that date, all with Ryan: This Is the Life (1944), with Foster; The Merry Monahans (1944), with Blyth and Jack Oakie; Bowery to Broadway (1945), another all-star effort where O'Connor had a cameo; and Patrick the Great (1945).

=== Return from war service ===
Upon O'Connor's return from military service, he found that his employers had changed hands. A merger in 1946 had reorganized the studio as Universal-International, with new executives in charge. They didn't know O'Connor, now nearly broke, and didn't know what to do with him. Finally, the studio paired O'Connor opposite their biggest female star, Deanna Durbin, in Something in the Wind (1947), and kept him busy in musical comedies: Are You with It? (1948) with Olga San Juan, Feudin', Fussin' and A-Fightin' (1949) with Marjorie Main and Percy Kilbride, and Yes Sir, That's My Baby (1949) with Gloria DeHaven.

"I wasn't really a dancer, a good dancer, until I got older," he said later. "I could do those wings and stuff and I looked very good, but my heavens, it was very, very hard for me to pick up on — pick up steps. It was just oh — so laborious for me. I didn't have a short cut like the other dancers do."

=== Francis ===
In 1949, O'Connor played the lead role in Francis, the story of a soldier befriended by a talking mule. Directed by Arthur Lubin, the film was a huge success. As a consequence, his musical career was constantly interrupted by production of one Francis film per year until 1955. O'Connor later said the films "were fun to make. Actually, they were quite challenging. I had to play straight in order to convince the audience that the mule could talk."

O'Connor followed the first Francis with comedies: Curtain Call at Cactus Creek (1950), The Milkman (1950), and Double Crossbones (1951).

He did Francis Goes to the Races (1951), another big hit. In February 1951 he signed a new contract with Universal for one film a year for four years, enabling him to work outside the studio.

=== Singin' in the Rain ===
In January 1952, O'Connor signed a three-picture deal with Paramount. He also received an offer to play Cosmo the piano player in Singin' in the Rain (1952) at Metro-Goldwyn-Mayer

That film featured his widely known rendition of "Make 'Em Laugh," which he choreographed with help from the assistant dance directors and his brother. The number featured dozens of jumps, pratfalls, and two backflips launched by running halfway up a wall.

"The scene was building to such a crescendo, I thought I'd actually have to kill myself," said O'Connor.

He acted alongside Gene Kelly, and earned the 1953 Golden Globe Award for Best Performance by an Actor in a Comedy or Musical.

O'Connor went back to Universal for Francis Goes to West Point (1952) then returned to MGM for I Love Melvin (1953) a musical with Debbie Reynolds.

He began appearing regularly on television. One review in 1952 called him "1952's new star. Movie bred, he has the versatility of a Jimmy Durante and the effervescence of youth. He can dance, he can sing, he can act, and he can spout humor, but not yet with the finesse of a veteran."

He supported Ethel Merman in Call Me Madam (1953) at 20th Century Fox, later saying the film contained his best dancing. He co-starred in another Fox musical, There's No Business Like Show Business (1954), which featured Irving Berlin's music and also starred with Ethel Merman, Marilyn Monroe (O'Connor's on screen love interest), Dan Dailey, Mitzi Gaynor, and Johnnie Ray.

After Francis Covers the Big Town (1953), Universal put O'Connor in a musical in color, Walking My Baby Back Home (1953) with Janet Leigh.

O'Connor's industry and public recognition reached a peak in 1954, when he was asked to emcee that year's Academy Awards ceremony.

He received excellent notices for Francis Joins the WACS (1954) and was scheduled to play Bing Crosby's partner in White Christmas (1954). O'Connor was forced to withdraw because he contracted an illness transmitted by the mule and was replaced in the film by Danny Kaye.

O'Connor, resentful of how the Francis series had interfered with his musical career, reluctantly agreed to star in Francis in the Navy (1955). Arthur Lubin, who directed the series, later recalled that O'Connor "got very difficult" to work with: "He'd sit in his dressing room and stare into space, and I think he had problems at home."

Universal did not renew O'Connor's contract after 13 years with the company. At a farewell luncheon, the studio executives presented him with a gift: a camera and 14 rolls of film. O'Connor was stunned at the insignificance of the gift after all the millions of dollars he had made for the studio, and in later life recalled, "What can I say about these people?"

O'Connor and Bing Crosby united on Anything Goes (1956) at Paramount. That studio also released The Buster Keaton Story (1957), in which O'Connor had the title role.

The Brussels Symphony Orchestra recorded some of his work, and in 1956 he conducted the Los Angeles Philharmonic in a performance of his first symphony, "Reflections d'Un Comique."

=== Television ===
O'Connor was a regular host of NBC's Colgate Comedy Hour, and starred in The Donald O'Connor Show (1954–55) for one season.

He hosted a color television special on NBC in 1957, one of the earliest color programs to be preserved on a color kinescope; an excerpt of the telecast was included in NBC's 50th anniversary special in 1976.

In the late 1950s, he began guest starring on shows like Playhouse 90, The DuPont Show of the Month, and The Red Skelton Hour. But his focus moved increasingly to touring live shows.

=== 1960s ===
O'Connor teamed with Glenn Ford in Cry for Happy (1961) at Columbia and he played the title role in The Wonders of Aladdin (1961) for MGM.

He subsequently focused on theatre work and his nightclub act, performing in Las Vegas. He returned to Universal for the first time in ten years to make the Sandra Dee comedy That Funny Feeling (1965).

He did episodes of Bob Hope Presents the Chrysler Theatre, Vacation Playhouse, ABC Stage 67 and The Jackie Gleason Show. He also appeared in several productions of Little Me.

In 1968, O'Connor hosted a syndicated talk show also called The Donald O'Connor Show. The program was canceled because the dancer was becoming "too political," and O'Connor was reprimanded by the studio.

He was among the first to receive a star on the Hollywood Walk of Fame in 1960.

=== 1970s ===
He began to use nitroglycerin pills before performances so that he would have the stamina to complete them. He then suffered a heart attack in 1971, leading him to quit taking the medication.

He was in a TV production of Li'l Abner (1971) and continued to perform on stage, notably in Las Vegas.

He guest-starred on episodes of The Girl with Something Extra, Ellery Queen, The Bionic Woman, Police Story, and Hunter.

O'Connor claimed to have overcome his depression after being hospitalized for three months after collapsing in 1978. He wrote letters to his friends and family explaining that his life had "completely changed." The dancer was paralyzed from the waist down, but recovered by way of physical therapy. The letters detail the lives of other patients, particularly a 30-year-old man who was completely immobilized.

"I won't take anything I have for granted again," was written in each letter. O'Connor credited the patients he met and thanked God for allowing him to recover.

=== 1980s ===
He appeared as a gaslight-era entertainer in the 1981 film Ragtime, notable for similar encore performances by James Cagney and Pat O'Brien. It was his first feature film role in 16 years.

O'Connor appeared in the short-lived Bring Back Birdie on Broadway in 1981. The following year he was in I Ought to Be in Pictures in Los Angeles.

He was Cap'n Andy in a short-lived Broadway revival of Show Boat (1983) and continued to tour in various shows and acts.

"I've been on the road forever," he said in 1985, adding "I'd consider another movie or a TV series, but I won't play an old man. Art Carney is about my age and he's making a career out of being old. I'm still singing and dancing. I'm not ready to be old."

O'Connor guest starred on The Littlest Hobo, Fantasy Island, Simon & Simon, Hotel, Alice in Wonderland, The Love Boat, and Highway to Heaven, and was in the films Pandemonium (1982), A Mouse, a Mystery and Me (1988), and A Time to Remember (1988).

He bought a theatre, the Donald O'Connor Theatre, and would perform in it with his children. In a 1989 interview he said "There's an element out there that wants to be entertained-and they can't find this kind of thing I do. And yeah, I think I wear well. I sing, I dance, I do comedy. I'm not threatening. When you grow up in a circus family, the more things you learn, the more you get paid. So I can do straight comedy without the song and dance; I can do all kinds of combinations. Whatever's in at the time, I can fit into."

He developed heart trouble and underwent successful quadruple-bypass surgery in 1990.

=== 1990s ===
O'Connor continued to make film and television appearances into the 1990s, including the Robin Williams film Toys (1992) as the president of a toy-making company. He continued to perform live.

He had guest roles in Murder, She Wrote, Tales from the Crypt, The Building, The Nanny and Frasier, and was in the films Bandit: Bandit's Silver Angel (1994), and Father Frost (1996).

In 1992, he said, "I never wanted to be a superstar. I'm working on being a quasar, because stars wear out. Quasars go on forever... I look for the parts where I die and they talk about me for the rest of the movie."

In 1998, he received a Golden Palm Star on the Palm Springs, California, Walk of Stars.

O'Connor's last feature film was the Jack Lemmon-Walter Matthau comedy Out to Sea, in which he played a dance host on a cruise ship. O'Connor was still making public appearances well into 2003. He said he went on the road "about 32 weeks a year. I do my concert work and I do night clubs and that kind of stuff. So I don't dance much any more, but I do enough to show people I can still move my legs."

== Personal life ==
O'Connor was married twice and had four children. His first marriage was in 1944 to Gwendolyn Carter, when he was 18 and she was 20. They married in Tijuana. Together they had one child, a daughter Donna. The couple divorced in 1954.

He was married to Gloria Noble from October 11, 1956 until his death. They had three children: Alicia, Fred, and Kevin. They were married for 47 years and lived in Thousand Oaks, California. Gloria died on June 11, 2013, of natural causes.

O'Connor had undergone quadruple heart bypass surgery in 1990, and he nearly died from pleural pneumonia in January 1999. He died from complications of heart failure on September 27, 2003, at age 78 at the Motion Picture & Television Country House and Hospital, in Woodland Hills, California.

== Filmography ==
=== Film ===
Year	Title	Role	Notes
1937	Melody for Two	Specialty Act	Uncredited
1937	It Can't Last Forever	Kid Dancer	Uncredited
1938	Men with Wings	Young Pat Falconer	
1938	Sing You Sinners	Mike Beebe	
1938	Sons of the Legion	Butch Baker	
1938	Tom Sawyer, Detective	Huckleberry Finn	
1939	Boy Trouble	Butch	
1939	Unmarried	Young Ted Streaver	
1939	Million Dollar Legs	Sticky Boone	
1939	Beau Geste	Young Beau Geste	
1939	Night Work	Butch Smiley	
1939	Death of a Champion	Small Fry	
1939	On Your Toes	Young Phil Dolan Jr.	
1942	What's Cookin'?	Tommy	
1942	Private Buckaroo	Donny	
1942	Give Out, Sisters	Don	
1942	Get Hep to Love	Jimmy Arnold	
1942	When Johnny Comes Marching Home	Frankie Flanagan	
1943	It Comes Up Love	Ricky Ives	
1943	Mister Big	Donald J. O'Connor, Esq.	
1943	Top Man	Don Warren	
1944	Chip Off the Old Block	Donald Corrigan	
1944	Follow the Boys	Donald O'Connor	
1944	This Is the Life	Jimmy Plum	
1944	Patrick the Great	Pat Donahue Jr.	
1944	The Merry Monahans	Jimmy Monahan	
1944	Bowery to Broadway	Specialty Number #1	
1947	Something in the Wind	Charlie Read	
1948	Are You With It?	Milton Haskins	
1948	Feudin', Fussin', and A-Fightin'	Wilbur McMurty	
1949	Yes Sir That's My Baby	William Waldo Winfield	
1949	Screen Snapshots: Motion Picture Mothers, Inc.	Himself	Short film
1950	Francis	Peter Stirling	
1950	Curtain Call at Cactus Creek	Edward Timmons	
1950	The Milkman	Roger Bradley	
1951	Double Crossbones	Davey Crandall	
1951	Francis Goes to the Races	Peter Stirling	
1952	Singin' in the Rain	Cosmo Brown	
1952	Francis Goes to West Point	Peter Stirling	
1953	Call Me Madam	Kenneth Gibson	
1953	I Love Melvin	Melvin Hoover	
1953	Francis Covers the Big Town	Peter Stirling	
1953	Walking My Baby Back Home	Clarence 'Jigger' Millard	
1954	Francis Joins the WACS	Peter Stirling	
1954	There's No Business Like Show Business	Tim Donahue	
1955	Francis in the Navy	Lt. Peter Stirling/Slicker Donovan	
1956	Anything Goes	Ted Adams	
1957	The Buster Keaton Story	Buster Keaton	
1961	Cry for Happy	Murray Prince	
1961	The Wonders of Aladdin	Aladdin	
1965	That Funny Feeling	Harvey Granson	
1974	Just One More Time	Himself	Short film/uncredited
1974	That's Entertainment!	Himself	
1978	The Big Fix	Francis Joins the Navy	
1981	Ragtime	Dance Instructor	
1982	Pandemonium	Mr. Dandy	
1989	A Time to Remember	Father Walsh	
1992	Toys	Kenneth Zevo	
1994	Bandit's Silver Angel	Uncle Cyrus	
1996	Father Frost	Baba Yaga	
1997	Out to Sea	Jonathan Devereaux	

=== Television ===
Year	Title	Role	Notes
1950	All Star Revue	Himself	Episode: "1x5"
1951–1954	Colgate Comedy Hour	Himself	20 episodes
1953-1962	The Ed Sullivan Show	Himself	3 episodes
1954	The Jimmy Durante Show	Himself	Episode: "1x1"
1954–1955	The Donald O'Connor Show	Himself	19 episodes
1956–1961	The Dinah Shore Chevy Show	Himself	2 episodes
1957	Playhouse 90	Himself/Dr. Robert Harrison	2 episodes: The Clouded Image & The Jet Propelled Couch
1958	DuPont Show of the Month	Johnny Shaw	Episode: "The Red Mill"
1958	The Red Skelton Hour	Himself	Episode: "Friends of the Red Skelton Variety Show"
1959	Pontiac Star Parade	Himself	Television special
1962	Tonight Starring Jack Paar	Guest Host	5 episodes
1963	The Judy Garland Show	Himself	Episode: "1x7"
1964–1967	The Hollywood Palace	Host	6 episodes
1964	Petticoat Junction	—N/a	Director episode: "The Ladybugs"
1964	The Bob Hope Thanksgiving Special	Himself	Television special
1964—1966	The Bell Telephone Hour	Himself	3 episodes
1964–1969	The Bob Hope Show	Himself	2 episodes
1966	The Chrysler Theatre	Benjamin Boggs	Episode: "Brilliant Benjamin Boggs"
1966	Vacation Playhouse	Donald Dugan	Episode: "The Hoofer"
1966	ABC Stage 67	Hermes	Episode: "Olympus 7-0000"
1967–1974	The Dean Martin Show	Himself	5 episodes
1968	...and Debbie Makes Six	Himself	Television special
1968–1969	The Donald O'Connor Show	Himself	5 episodes
1969–1970	The Carol Burnett Show	Himself	2 episodes
1969	The Jackie Gleason Show	Charlie Ryan/Charlie Pineapple	Episode: "The Honeymooners: Hawaii, Oh! Oh!"
1970	The Engelbert Humperdinck Show	Himself	Episode: "1x1"
1970	The Andy Williams Show	Himself	2 episodes
1970	The Don Knotts Show	Himself	Episode: "1x10"
1971	Li'l Abner	General Bashington T. Bullmoose	Television special
1972	The Bobby Darin Amusement Company	Himself	Episode: "1x4"
1972–1973	The Julie Andrews Hour	Himself	2 episodes
1973	The Bobby Darin Show	Himself	Episode: "1x7"
1974	The Girl with Something Extra	William	Episode: "Irreconcilable Sameness"
1975	Ellery Queen	Kenneth Freeman	Episode: "The Comic Book Crusader"
1976	The Bionic Woman	Harry Anderson	Episode: "A Thing of the Past"
1976	Police Story	Holly Connor	Episode: "Payment Deferred"
1976	Tony Orlando and Dawn	Himself	Episode: "Donald O'Connor/Soupy Sales"
1977	Hunter	Lou Martin	Episode: "The Costa Rican Connection"
1980	Lucy Moves to NBC	Himself	Television film
1980	The Steve Allen Comedy Hour	Himself	Episode: "Donald O'Connor, Martin Mull, Joey Forman"
1981–1986	The Love Boat	Howard Enicker/Leo Halbert/Oscar Tilton	3 episodes
1981	Alice	Himself	Episode: "Guinness on Tap"
1981	Standing Room Only	George M. Cohan	Episode: "The Last Great Vaudeville Show"
1982	The Littlest Hobo	Freddie the Clown	Episode: "The Clown"
1982	Fantasy Island	Dr. Johnn Watson	Episode: "The Cast Against Mr. Roarke/Save Sherlock Holmes"
1983	Simon & Simon	George Decova/Barnaby the Great	Episode: "Grand Illusion"
1983	Alice in Wonderland	Mock Turtle	Television film
1983	Hotel	David Connelly	Episode: "The Offer"
1985	Half Nelson	Director	Episode: "The Deadly Vase"
1985	Alice in Wonderland	The Lory Bird	Miniseries
1987	Highway to Heaven	Jackie Clark	Episode: "Playing for Keeps"
1987	A Mouse, a Mystery and Me	Alex the Mouse (voice)	Television special
1990	Murder, She Wrote	Barry Barnes	Episode: "The Big Show of 1965"
1992	Tales from the Crypt	Joseph Renfield	Episode: "Strung Along"
1993	The Building	Mr. Kennedy	Episode: "Father Knows Best"
1996	Frasier	Harlow Safford	Episode: "Crane vs. Crane"
1996	The Nanny	Fred	Episode: "Freida Needa Man"

=== Stage ===
- Little Me (1964; 1965; 1968; 1980)
- Promises, Promises (1972)
- Where's Charley? (1976)
- Weekend with Feathers (1976)
- Sugar (1979)
- Wally's Cafe (1980)
- Bring Back Birdie (1981)
- Say Hello to Harvey (1981)
- Show Boat (1982; 1983)
- I Ought to Be in Pictures (1982)
- How to Succeed in Business Without Really Trying (1985)
- Two for the Show (1989)
- Charley's Aunt (1989)
- The Sunshine Boys (1990)
- The Fabulous Palm Springs Follies (1998)

== See also ==
- List of dancers
