= Chill Wills =

American actor and singer (1902–1978)

- Wills in 1941
- Born: Theodore Childress Wills; July 18, 1902; Seagoville, Texas, U.S.
- Died: December 15, 1978 (aged 76); Encino, California, U.S.
- Resting place: Grand View Memorial Park Cemetery; Glendale, California, U.S.
- Occupations: Actor, singer
- Years active: 1934–1978
- Spouses: Hattie Chappelle (m. 1928; died 1971) Novadeen Googe (m. 1973)

Theodore Childress "Chill" Wills (July 18, 1902 – December 15, 1978) was an American actor and a singer in the Avalon Boys quartet.

== Early life ==
Wills was born in Seagoville, Texas, on July 18, 1902.

== Career ==
Wills was a performer from early childhood, forming and leading the Avalon Boys singing group in the 1930s. He provided the deep voice for Stan Laurel's performance of "The Trail of the Lonesome Pine" in Way Out West (1937), in which the Avalon Boys Quartet appeared. After appearing in a few Westerns, he disbanded the group in 1938, and struck out on a solo acting career.

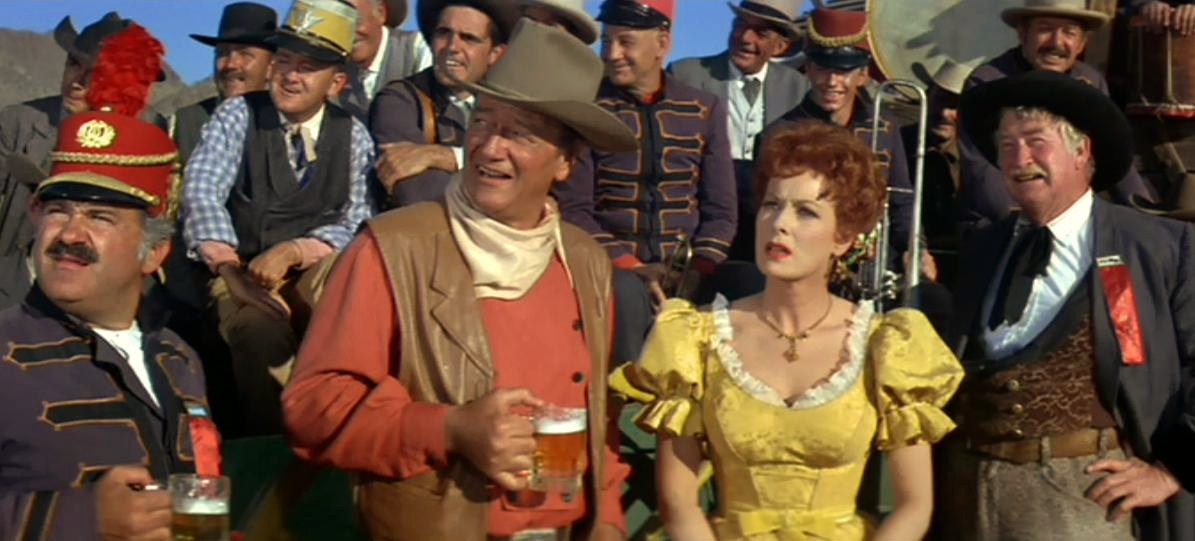
Jack Kruschen, John Wayne, Maureen O'Hara, and Wills in McLintock! (1963)

During the 1940s, Wills was a contract player for Metro-Goldwyn-Mayer, appearing in Westerns. He was also cast in a number of dramatic roles, including "the City of Chicago" as personified by a phantom police sergeant in the film noir City That Never Sleeps (1953), and Uncle Bawley in Giant (1956).

For his role as Davy Crockett's companion, Beekeeper, in The Alamo (1960), Wills was nominated for the Academy Award for Best Supporting Actor. However, his aggressive campaign for the award was considered tasteless by many, including the film's star/director/producer John Wayne, who publicly apologized for Wills. His publicity agent, Wojciechowicz "Bow Wow" Wojtkiewicz (former husband of gossip columnist Sheilah Graham), accepted blame for the ill-advised effort, claiming Wills knew nothing about it. The Oscar was won by Peter Ustinov for his role as Lentulus Batiatus in Spartacus.

Wills voiced Francis the Talking Mule in a series of 1950s comedy films. His deep, rough voice, with its Western twang, was matched to the personality of the cynical, sardonic mule. As was customary at the time, Wills was given no billing for his vocal work, though he was featured prominently on-screen as blustery General Ben Kaye in the fourth entry, Francis Joins the WACS.

In 1959, he starred as Bije Wilcox in "The Bije Wilcox Story" on Wagon Train. In Rory Calhoun's Western series The Texan, Wills appeared in the lead role in the 1960 episode titled "The Eyes of Captain Wylie". Wills starred in the series Frontier Circus, which aired for only one season (1961–62) on CBS.

Wills guest-starred as title character "Abe Blocker" on Gunsmoke in 1962 as a deranged mountain man and old friend of Matt Dillon, preying on homesteaders. In 1966, he was cast in the role of a shady Texas rancher, Jim Ed Love, in the short-lived comedy/Western series The Rounders (reprising his role in the 1965 film The Rounders, starring Henry Fonda), with co-stars Ron Hayes, Patrick Wayne, and Walker Edmiston.

Two years later, Wills starred in the 1968 Gunsmoke episode "A Noose for Dobie Price", where he played Elihu Gorman, a former outlaw who joins forces with Marshal Matt Dillon, played by James Arness, to track down a member of his former gang who has escaped jail. In 1971, he appeared as Pat Reedy on The Men from Shiloh (rebranded name of the TV Western The Virginian) in the episode titled "The Angus Killer".

His last role was in 1978, as a janitor in Stubby Pringle's Christmas.

== Political involvement ==
In 1963–1964, Wills joined William Lundigan, Walter Brennan, and Efrem Zimbalist Jr. in making appearances on behalf of U.S. Senator Barry Goldwater, the Republican nominee in the campaign against U.S. President Lyndon B. Johnson.

Wills additionally supported Gordon McLendon, a conservative Democrat, against liberal incumbent Ralph Yarborough in the Democratic primary in the 1964 U.S. Senate election in Texas. McLendon ran on an anti-civil rights platform opposed to Yarborough, who was supportive of the act. McLendon lost the primary with 43% of the vote.

Later, in 1968, Wills refused to support Richard Nixon for the presidency and served as master of ceremonies for the California campaign stops of the George Wallace 1968 presidential campaign. Wills and Walter Brennan were among the few Hollywood celebrities to endorse Wallace's bid against Nixon and Hubert H. Humphrey.

== Other interests ==
Wills was a poker player and friend of Benny Binion, founder of the World Series of Poker and former owner of Binion's Horseshoe Casino in Las Vegas, Nevada. Wills participated in the first World Series held in 1970, and is seated in the center of a photo taken at the event.

== Death ==
On December 15, 1978, Wills died of cancer in Encino, California, aged 76. He was cremated and his ashes interred at Grand View Memorial Park Cemetery in Glendale, California.

== Partial filmography ==
- It's a Gift (1934) as Campfire Singer (uncredited)
- Bar 20 Rides Again (1935) as Background Singer / Henchman
- Anything Goes (1936) as Member of The Avalon Boys (uncredited)
- Call of the Prairie (1936) as Singing Cowhand
- Hideaway Girl (1936) as Lead Singer of Avalon Boys
- Way Out West (1937) as Lead Singer of the Avalon Boys / Stan's Bass Singing (uncredited)
- Nobody's Baby (1937) as Amateur Hour Lead Quartet Singer
- Block-Heads (1938) as Midget in Elevator (voice, uncredited)
- Lawless Valley (1938) as Deputy Speedy McGow
- Arizona Legion (1939) as Whopper Hatch
- Trouble in Sundown (1939) as Whopper
- Sorority House (1939) as Mr. Johnson
- Racketeers of the Range (1939) as Whopper Hatch
- Timber Stampede (1939) as Whopper Hatch
- The Day the Bookies Wept (1939) as Man on Bus (uncredited)
- Allegheny Uprising (1939) as John M'Cammon
- Boom Town (1940) as Deputy Harmony Jones
- Wyoming (1940) as Lafe (uncredited)
- The Westerner (1940) as Southeast
- Sky Murder (1940) as Sheriff Beckwith
- Tugboat Annie Sails Again (1940) as Shiftless
- Western Union (1941) as Homer Kettle
- The Bad Man (1941) as 'Red' Giddings
- Billy the Kid (1941) as Tom Patterson
- Belle Starr (1941) as Blue Duck
- Honky Tonk (1941) as The Sniper
- The Bugle Sounds (1942) as Sgt. Larry Dillon
- Tarzan's New York Adventure (1942) as Manchester Montford
- Her Cardboard Lover (1942) as Judge
- The Omaha Trail (1942) as Henry Hawkins
- Apache Trail (1942) as 'Pike' Skelton
- Stand by for Action (1942) as Chief Boatswain's Mate Jenks
- A Stranger in Town (1943) as Charles Craig
- Best Foot Forward (1943) as Chester Short
- See Here, Private Hargrove (1944) as First Sergeant Cramp
- Rationing (1944) as Bus Driver (scenes deleted)
- Barbary Coast Gent (1944) as Sheriff Hightower
- Meet Me in St. Louis (1944) as Mr. Neely
- I'll Be Seeing You (1944) as Swanson
- Sunday Dinner for a Soldier (1944) as Mr. York
- What Next, Corporal Hargrove? (1945) as Sergeant Cramp
- Leave Her to Heaven (1945) as Leick Thome
- The Harvey Girls (1946) as H.H. Hartsey
- Gallant Bess (1946) as Chief Petty Officer
- The Yearling (1946) as Buck Forrester
- High Barbaree (1947) as Lars (uncredited)
- Heartaches (1947) as 'Breezie' Mann
- The Sainted Sisters (1948) as Will Twitchell
- Northwest Stampede (1948) as Mileaway
- The Saxon Charm (1948) as Captain Chatham
- That Wonderful Urge (1948) as Homer Beggs, Justice of the Peace, Monroe Township
- Family Honeymoon (1948) as Fred
- Loaded Pistols (1948) as Sheriff Cramer
- Tulsa (1949) as Pinky Jimpson (Narrator)
- Red Canyon (1949) as Brackton
- Francis (1950) as Francis the Talking Mule (voice, uncredited)
- The Sundowners (1950) as Sam Beers
- Rock Island Trail (1950) as Hogger McCoy
- Stella (1950) as Chief Clark (uncredited)
- High Lonesome (1950) as Boatwhistle, Ranch Cook
- Rio Grande (1950) as Dr. Wilkins (regimental surgeon)
- Oh! Susanna (1951) as Sergeant Barhydt
- Francis Goes to the Races (1951) as Francis the Talking Mule (voice, uncredited)
- Cattle Drive (1951) as Dallas
- The Sea Hornet (1951) as Swede
- Bronco Buster (1952) as Dan Bream
- Francis Goes to West Point (1952) as Francis the Talking Mule (voice, uncredited)
- Ride the Man Down (1952) as Ike Adams
- Small Town Girl (1953) as 'Happy', Jailer (uncredited)
- Francis Covers the Big Town (1953) as Francis the Talking Mule (voice, uncredited)
- City That Never Sleeps (1953) as Sergeant Joe, the 'Voice of Chicago'
- The Man from the Alamo (1953) as John Gage
- Tumbleweed (1953) as Sheriff Murchoree
- Francis Joins the WACS (1954) as General Benjamin Kaye / Francis the Talking Mule (voice)
- Ricochet Romance (1954) as Tom Williams
- Hell's Outpost (1954) as Kevin Russel
- Timberjack (1955) as Steve Riika
- Kentucky Rifle (1955) as Tobias Taylor
- Francis in the Navy (1955) as Francis the Talking Mule (voice, uncredited)
- Santiago (1956) as Captain 'Sidewheel' Jones
- Giant (1956) as Uncle Bawley
- Gun for a Coward (1957) as Loving
- Gun Glory (1957) as Preacher
- From Hell to Texas (1958) as Amos Bradley
- Alfred Hitchcock Presents (1958) (Season 4 Episode 2: "Don't Interrupt") as Mr. Kilmer
- The Sad Horse (1959) as Captain Connors
- The Alamo (1960) as Beekeeper
- Where the Boys Are (1960) as Police Captain
- Gold of the Seven Saints (1961) as Doc Wilson Gates
- The Little Shepherd of Kingdom Come (1961) as Major Buford
- The Deadly Companions (1961) as Turk, "a half-crazed card shark"
- Gunsmoke (1962) as Abe Blocker
- Young Guns of Texas (1962) as Preacher Sam Shelby
- McLintock! (1963) as Drago
- The Wheeler Dealers (1963) as Jay Ray Spinelby
- The Cardinal (1963) as Monsignor Whittle
- The Rounders (1965) as Jim Ed Love
- Fireball 500 (1966) as Big Jaw Harris
- Big Daddy (1969)
- The Over-the-Hill Gang (1969) as George Asque, retired Texas Ranger
- The Liberation of L.B. Jones (1970) as Mr. Ike
- The Over-the-Hill Gang Rides Again (1970) as George Asque
- Night Gallery (1970) as Heppelwhite (segment "The Little Black Bag")
- The Steagle (1971) as Tall-Guy McCoy
- Alias Smith and Jones (1972) in Season 2 Episode 19: "The Biggest Game in the West"
- Guns of a Stranger (1973) as Tom Duncan
- Pat Garrett & Billy the Kid (1973) as Lemuel
- Mr. Billion (1977) as Colonel Clayton T. Winkle
- Poco... Little Dog Lost (1977) as Big Burt
