= The Avalon Boys =

Quartet of singers popular in the 1930s

The Avalon Boys were a quartet of singers popular in the 1930s. They appeared in a number of comedy films and had a memorable role in Laurel and Hardy's Way Out West.

== Members ==
- Chill Wills (bass), b. July 18, 1902, d. December 15, 1978
- Art Greene
- Walter Weyland Trask (guitar), b. 26 November 1911, d. 27 June 1999
- Don Brookins (baritone, arranger, and piano), b. 29 January 1909 - d. 4 November 1994

== Film appearances ==
- It's a Gift (1934)
- Bar 20 Rides Again (1935)
- Call of the Prairie (1936)
- Anything Goes (1936)
- Way Out West (1937)
- Hideaway Girl (1937)
