= Francis Goes to the Races =

1951 film by Arthur Lubin

- Directed by: Arthur Lubin
- Written by: Robert Arthur (story); Oscar Brodney (screenplay); David Stern (screenplay and characters)
- Produced by: Leonard Goldstein
- Starring: Donald O'Connor; Piper Laurie; Chill Wills; Cecil Kellaway; Jesse White
- Cinematography: Irving Glassberg
- Edited by: Milton Carruth
- Music by: Frank Skinner
- Production company: Universal Pictures
- Distributed by: Universal-International
- Release date: May 1, 1951
- Running time: 88 minutes
- Country: United States
- Language: English
- Box office: $2.3 million (US rentals)

Francis Goes to the Races is a 1951 American Universal-International black-and-white comedy film produced by Leonard Goldstein, directed by Arthur Lubin and starring Donald O'Connor, Piper Laurie and Cecil Kellaway. The distinctive voice of Francis the Talking Mule is a supplied by actor Chill Wills. The film is a sequel to the 1950 film Francis and the second of seven films in the franchise.

== Plot ==
Francis the Talking Mule and his sidekick Peter Sterling visit Colonel Travers and his granddaughter on their family horse farm, where Peter becomes involved in the world of horse racing. A crime boss and his men trying to fix races involving the Travers' horses. Peter accepts an offer to have Francis boarded at the race track stables as a companion animal. Peter also takes a job there..

Peter learns that horse racing is an expensive sport. The Traverses are in debt and are counting on their horse Sudden Storm to win the big handicap race, but creditor "Square Deal" Mallory claims the horse before the race. Frances Travers gives Peter her life savings of $25,000.00 with instructions to purchase Sudden Storm, but Peter buys Oakwood Gal, a filly of doubtful talent.

Francis can talk to horses, so he is able to provide Peter with some solid tips on the next day's races. Peter wins seven races in a row and repays the $25,000.00 to the Traverses. However, this attracts the attention of the racing commission, which demands to know the source of Peter's information. Racetrack detective Frank Damer shadows Peter night and day but only grows more confused.

Mallory kidnaps Peter and demands that he work his racetrack magic for them. Without Francis to guide him, Peter costs the gamblers $200,000. Mallory is furious but decides against killing Peter.

Francis is convinced that he can coach Oakwood Gal to victory and reveals his talking ability to the Traverses. Thugs enter Oakwood Gal's stable to injure her, but Francis kicks them into submission. Francis is shot in the rear end and insults the veterinarians who treat the wound.

Oakwood Gal wins the big race by a nose over Sudden Storm, but the racing commission suspects a fix. Francis says that Sudden Storm and Oakwood Gal are siblings, and that Sudden Storm was only doing the gentlemanly thing. The commission is worried that Francis may take his race-prediction skills nationwide, but Peter and Francis leave town.

== Cast ==
- Donald O'Connor as Peter Stirling
- Piper Laurie as Frances Travers
- Cecil Kellaway as Colonel Travers
- Jesse White as Frank Damer
- Barry Kelley as 'Square Deal' Mallory
- Hayden Rorke as Rogers
- Vaughn Taylor as Harrington
- Larry Keating as Head Steward
- Don Beddoe as Dr.Quimby, Vet (uncredited)
- Bill Walker as Sam, the groomer (uncredited)
- Dick Wessel as Chuck (uncredited)
- Kenneth Mac Donald as Racing Steward (uncredited)
- Willard Waterman as Track Exerciser (uncredited)

== Production ==
Francis had been a success, and in May 1950 Universal announced its purchase of the film rights to David Stern's character of Francis. These included rights to his 1948 novel Francis Goes to Washington and to any other Francis books that he may write. Universal could produce an unlimited number of film sequels and use the character for television, radio and commercials. For these rights, Stern was paid a reported $60,000.

Francis Goes to Washington was intended as be the first sequel, but its production was postponed as there were "too many complications" for the film "to be made as things stand at the present". As a result, the film was never made.

The production of Francis Goes to the Races was announced in October 1950, with production starting the following month. The film was shot at Santa Anita Park, and Hill Prince, Coaltown and Moonrush were among the real-life horses who appeared in the film.

== Reception ==
In a contemporary review for The New York Times, critic Howard Thompson wrote: "Of course, it's the fantastic, unkissable mouth of Francis, tipping off Mr. O'Connor about the winners, that is still the root of the gaiety. Occasionally, as in one very adroit scene where he suavely psychoanalyzes a brow-beaten filly into saving the day on the turf, it makes the picture sparkle. But for the most part he comments disgustedly—in fact, more and more like the scathing Clifton Webb—on the pedantic behavior of Mr. O'Connor, Mr. Kellaway and Miss Laurie and the others, and no wonder. A mule is a mule, enough is enough and we suspect that Francis, until he's pushed headlong into the role of Hamlet, would be the first to admit it."

== Home media ==
The first two Francis films were rereleased in 2004 by Universal Pictures on Region 1 and Region 4 DVD, along with the next two in the series, as The Adventures of Francis the Talking Mule Vol. 1. Several years later, Universal released all seven Francis films as a set on three Region 1 and Region 4 DVDs, Francis The Talking Mule: The Complete Collection.

== See also ==
- List of films about horses
- List of films about horse racing
