= Francis the Talking Mule =

Mule character in a 1946 novel and series of American films in the 1950s

- Seven Francis the Talking Mule movies character
- First appearance: Francis (1946)
- Created by: David Stern III

In-universe information
- Species: Mule
- Gender: Male

Francis the Talking Mule is a fictional mule who first appeared in three short stories written for Esquire magazine by David Stern, which he later combined into the 1946 novel Francis. This was the basis of a series of seven Universal-International comedy films released from 1950 to 1956.

== The beginning ==
From the Francis book jacket:

David Stern says: "When I joined the Army in 1943, I had been publishing a couple of newspapers. I told this to the classification interviewer, who dutifully recorded my civilian background on a large card. They say the Army always finds the job to fit the man. I was assigned as assistant on a garbage truck.

"Circumstances led me, via Officer Candidate School, to Hawaii, where I was assigned as Co-Officer-in-Charge of an Army newspaper called MIDPACIFICAN. One night I was sitting looking at a blank, unpainted wall. To pass the time I wrote four pages of dialogue between a second lieutenant and an Army mule. I had no intention of writing more. But that little runt of a mule kept bothering me. With memories of OCS fresh in my mind I thought I might rid myself of the creature by shipping him off to become a second lieutenant. Francis outwitted me. He refused to go".

Stern wrote several short stories for Esquire under the name of Peter Stern about an Army 2nd lieutenant fighting the Japanese in the jungles of Burma. Following the war, he connected the stories "I Meet Francis," "Francis and the Golden," and "Francis Unmasked" into the 1946 novel Francis.

In 1948, Stern published the sequel Francis Goes to Washington, with the former lieutenant (now named Peter Sterling) running for Congress with the help of Francis. Stern gave up fiction writing to become editor of the New Orleans Item, a newspaper that he purchased in 1949 and ran until 1958.

Mickey Rooney was originally considered for a United Artists Francis feature film before Universal-International acquired the rights. Rooney took the lead after Donald O'Connor left, doing the final film in the series, Francis in the Haunted House.

== Themes ==
The book and film series focused on the exploits of Francis, an experienced Army mule, and Peter Stirling (played by Donald O'Connor), the young soldier whom he befriends. Francis then stays with Peter through civilian life and back in the military. In the original 1950 film, the mule identifies himself to the commanding general as "Francis...123rd Mule Detachment...[serial number] M52519." With a plot device like the later series Mister Ed, Francis would usually talk only to Peter, thus causing problems for his nominal "master." The first six films were directed by Universal comedy veteran Arthur Lubin, previously known for helming Abbott and Costello vehicles, who would go on to produce and direct Mister Ed for television.

As the titles indicated, each film had a different setting or gimmick, exposing the world-wise mule and the naive GI to race track excitement, the world of journalism, and many branches of the military, from West Point to the WACs to the Navy. The basic plots were fairly similar, however. Stirling, with the sage but sardonic advice of Francis (gleaned from overhearing generals plan strategy or from discussions with other equines), would triumph over his own incompetence. However, inevitably he would be forced to reveal that his adviser was a mule, and be subject to mental analysis (sometimes more than once per film) until the grand reveal, when Francis displayed his talent (usually either to individuals, or to a large group). The astonishing existence of a talking mule, however, was conveniently forgotten in the next film.

Some of the Francis films had animated trailers.

== Films ==
- Francis (1950) a.k.a. Francis the Talking Mule
- Francis Goes to the Races (1951)
- Francis Goes to West Point (1952)
- Francis Covers the Big Town (1953)
- Francis Joins the WACS (1954)
- Francis in the Navy (1955)
- Francis in the Haunted House (1956)

Francis Goes to Washington, based on the 1948 novel by Stern, was meant to be the first Francis sequel, but filming was postponed as there were "too many complications" for it "to be made as things stand at the present".

== Film series actors ==
The distinctive voice of Francis was provided by veteran character actor Chill Wills, who lent his deep, rough vocal texture and Western twang to the cynical and sardonic mule. As was customary at the time, Wills never received billing for his vocal work, though he was featured prominently on-screen as blustery General Ben Kaye in the fifth film, Francis Joins the WACS.

The mule who appeared on-screen was a female named Molly, selected because she was easy to handle. She was purchased from Ed Frazier in Drexel, Missouri. According to author Pauline Bartel, Universal paid $350 for the animal but made millions from the film series. Molly was trained by Les Hilton, an apprentice of Will Rogers; Hilton went on to train Bamboo Harvester, the horse that played Mister Ed. To create the impression that the mule was actually talking, Hilton used a thread fed into the animal's mouth which would cause Molly to try to remove it by moving her lips, the same technique used for Mister Ed.

The final film in the series, Francis in the Haunted House, was made without any of the key creative personnel. Leonard Maltin's Movie Guide states that O'Connor quit, and Mickey Rooney replaced him as a new character. Director Lubin and Chill Wills were also absent, replaced by Charles Lamont and voice actor Paul Frees, who did a close approximation of Wills's voice.

== Later appearances ==
David Stern and Frank Thomas scripted a 1952–53 syndicated comic strip, Francis, the Famous Talking Mule, illustrated by Cliff Rogerson, who also drew the gag panel, Tee Vee Laffs (1957–85). Seventeen issues of Francis the Famous Talking Mule were published as part of Dell's Four Color Comics series from 1951 to 1960, illustrated, alternately, by David Gantz and Don Gunn. Francis appeared on the television show What's My Line? on August 3, 1952.

== Video releases ==
The original film, Francis (1950), was released in 1978 as one of the first-ever titles in the new LaserDisc format, DiscoVision Catalog #22-003. It was later reissued in May 1994 on LaserDisc by MCA/Universal Home Video (Catalog #: 42024) as part of an Encore Edition Double Feature with Francis Goes to the Races (1951).

The first two Francis films were released again in 2004 by Universal Pictures on Region 1 and Region 4 DVD, along with the next two in the series, as The Adventures of Francis the Talking Mule Vol. 1. Several years later, Universal released all 7 Francis films as a set on three Region 1 and Region 4 DVDs, Francis The Talking Mule: The Complete Collection.. Kino Lorber would also release all 7 films on Blu-ray with new 2k masters and audio commentaries in 2022, under license from Universal.

== In popular culture ==
- The UPA cartoon short How Now Boing Boing (1954) featured a reference to Francis voiced by Marvin Miller.

== Sources ==
- Bartel, Pauline. Amazing Animal Actors. Dallas: Taylor Publishing, 1997. 0878339744
