= Harry Revier =

Film director

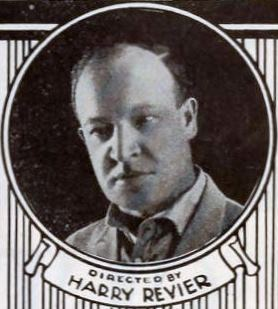
- Born: March 16, 1890; Philadelphia, Pennsylvania, United States
- Died: August 13, 1957 (aged 67); Winter Park, Florida, United States
- Occupation: Film director
- Years active: 1914 – 1957

Harry Jack Revier (16 March 1890 – 13 August 1957) was an independent American director, producer and first generation exploitation film maker best known for his sound films The Lost City (1935), Lash of the Penitentes (1936), and Child Bride (1938).

== Biography ==
Harry Revier was born in Philadelphia, Pennsylvania, in 1890. Some sources state that he gained early experience as a cinematographer in Europe, Italy, but his name is absent from passenger lists from that time. His earliest known screen credit is as the director of the Victor Film Company’s The Imp Abroad (1914), starring James W. Horne. Although Revier worked in the film industry for about 40 years, he only occasionally worked for any of the major studios. Most of his output consisted of low-budget programmers distributed on the "states rights" market, one-shot features or serials often made for companies organized only to make that one film, distributed haphazardly if at all (then, as now, it was much easier to actually get a film made than to get it distributed). Two exceptions are the Tarzan films that Revier co-directed for Edgar Rice Burroughs; one of these, The Son of Tarzan (1920), was a considerable hit. Shortly afterward he discovered actress Dorothy Revier, whom he married and launched in her film debut, The Broadway Madonna (1922). Though she did go on to some popularity in the 1920s, it was without her husband as they divorced in 1926.

With the dawn of sound, Harry traveled to England to make a "quota quickie"—low-budget films made to satisfy a British government requirement that a certain percentage of films shown in Britain had to be made in Britain—and worked on a couple of routine westerns. He scored notoriety of a sort with the infamous "Poverty Row" serial The Lost City (1935) featuring William "Stage" Boyd, an actor known for his alcoholism who died shortly after the film’s completion (in one famous incident, he was arrested in a drunken escapade and a newspaper story covering it the next day mistakenly published a photo of actor William Boyd, later to become famous as "Hopalong Cassidy"; the mistake put a screeching halt to his at the time rising career)--the film is regarded many many aficionados as "the worst serial ever made".

In 1936 Revier discovered some ethnographic footage of flagellant monks shot in New Mexico several years previously and built a racy feature around it, with star Marie DeForrest presented in a nude crucifixion scene. The resulting film, which was now called Lash of the Penitentes, became infamous and played on the states-rights market for years afterward. The notorious Child Bride followed. The film—the first produced by exploitation-film legend Kroger Babb, who marketed it as an "educational" picture—was a somewhat cheesy tale of early-teen and pre-teen girls being married off to elderly men, a long-standing practice in some of the more backward areas of the American South. Its signature scene was a lengthy skinny-dipping sequence featuring pre-pubescent starlet Shirley Mills. Afterwards, Revier disappears from the rolls of feature production, but reappears for a final time in 1953 with Planet Outlaws. Through the use of creative editing Revier converted the 1939 sci-fi serial Buck Rogers into an Atomic Age, Cold War context.

Harry Revier died in Winter Park, Florida, in 1957 at age 67.

== Legacy ==
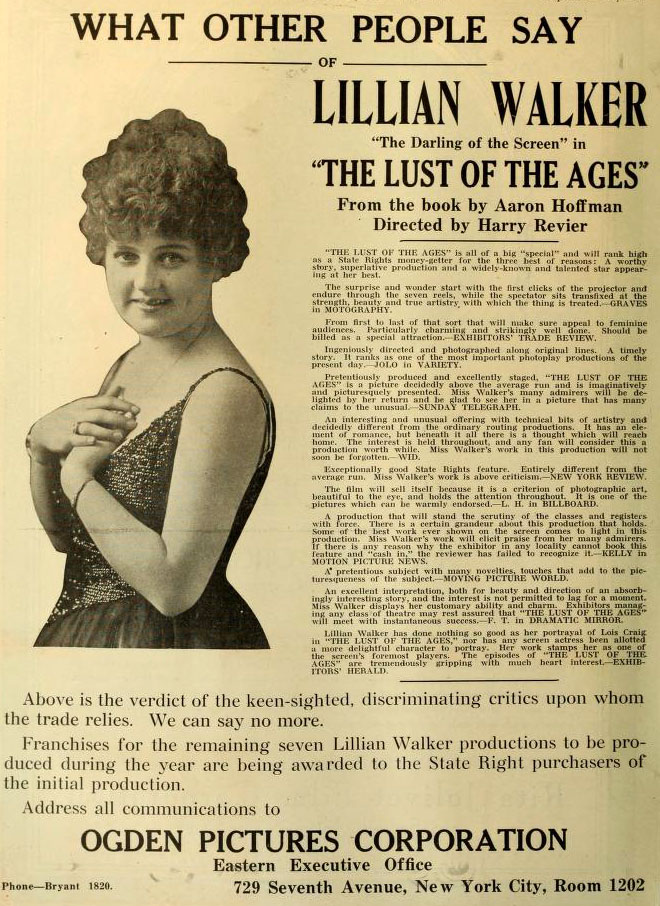
The Lust of the Ages (1917)

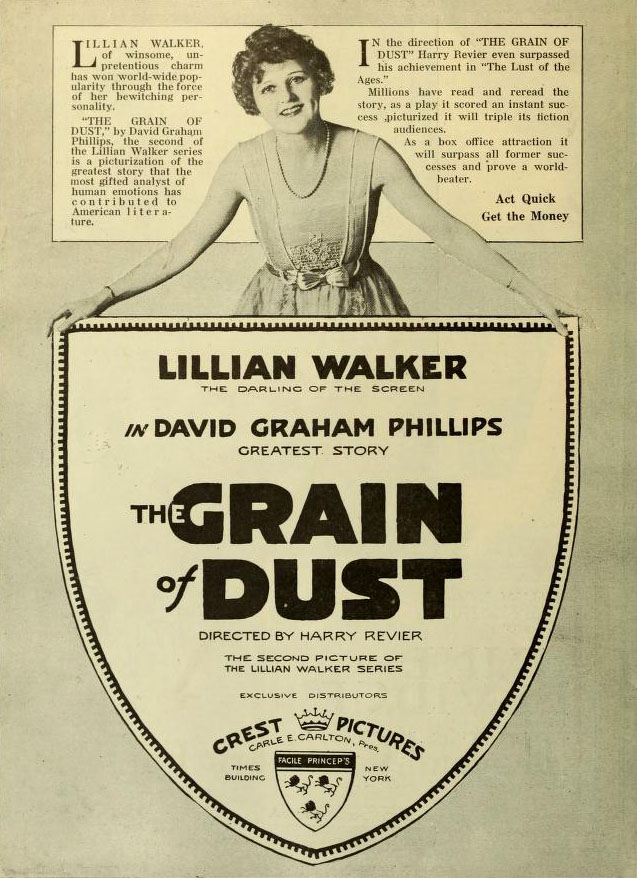
The Grain of Dust (1918)

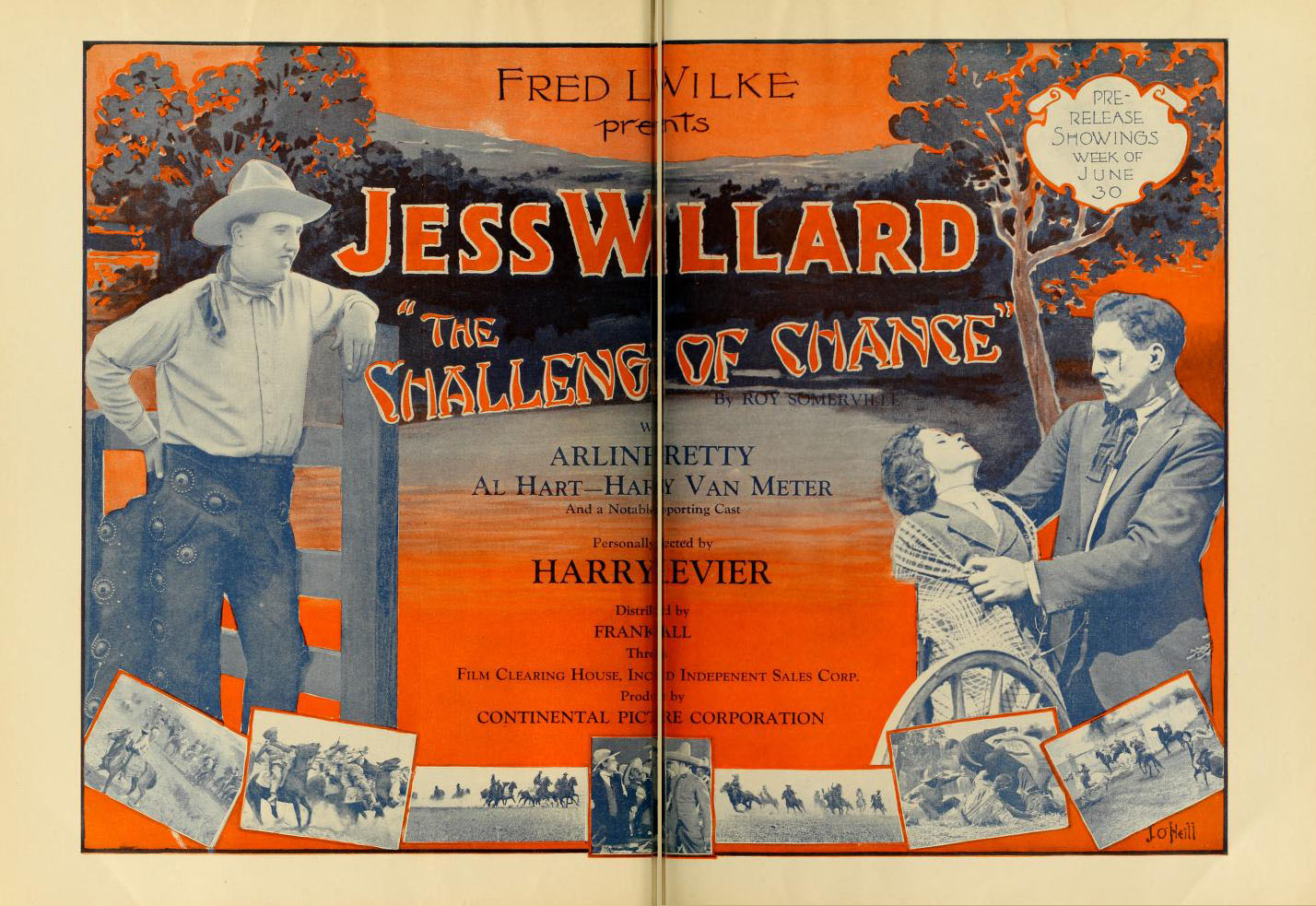
The Challenge of Chance (1919)

Harry Revier did the bulk of his film work in the silent era, and most of that output is lost. Confirmed extant is the serial The Son of Tarzan (1920) and the melodrama What Price Love? (1927) starring Jane Novak. Among the missing is the predecessor to The Son of Tarzan, The Revenge of Tarzan (1920); The Challenge of Chance (1919) starring prizefighter Jess Willard; and at least one of his talkies, Convict's Code (1930). (A short surviving portion of Convict's Code was preserved by the Academy Film Archive in 2013.) Some of his sound films are, to some extent, lost as well; censors butchered Lash of the Penitentes and in its longest known version—kept in the Library of Congress—only 42 minutes remain of its original 65-minute running time. Moreover, one of the feature-length condensations of his serial The Lost City—there were at least four-—has been lost as well. Although Revier's remaining output is slim, his films are quite unlike others of the time; his work, while lacking technical polish, is completely without regard for the production code in effect at the time. In that respect he precedes by a number of years the far better known work of Ed Wood and his films share the somewhat careless scripting and handling of actors evident in Wood's pictures, though he had little—if any—of Wood's artistic ambition.

== Filmography (incomplete) ==
- The Imp Abroad (1914)
- The Weakness of Strength (1916)
- Lust of the Ages (1917)
- The Grain of Dust (1918)
- A Romance of the Air (1918)
- What Shall We Do With Him? (1919)
- The Challenge of Chance (1919)
- The Son of Tarzan (serial; 1920)
- The Revenge of Tarzan (serial; 1920)
- Life's Greatest Question (1921)
- The Heart of the North (1921)
- The Broadway Madonna (1922)
- Dangerous Pleasure (1925)
- The Silk Bouquet (1926)
- What Price Love? (1927)
- The Thrill Seekers (1927)
- The Slaver (1927)
- The Mysterious Airman (serial; 1928)
- The Lone Wolf's Daughter (writer; 1929)
- The Gay Caballero (1929) starring Frank Crumit
- The Convict's Code (1930)
- Bill's Legacy (1931)
- When Lightning Strikes (1934)
- The Lost City (serial; 1935)
- The Lost City (first condensation, 1935)
- The Lost City (second condensation, 1935)
- Lash of the Penitentes (1937) co-directed with Roland Price
- Child Bride (1938)
- City of Lost Men (third condensation of The Lost City, 1940)
- Planet Outlaws (writer; 1953)
- City of Lost Men (fourth condensation of The Lost City, 1966)
