= The Weakness of Strength =

1916 film

The Weakness of Strength (aka:'The Evil That Men Do)
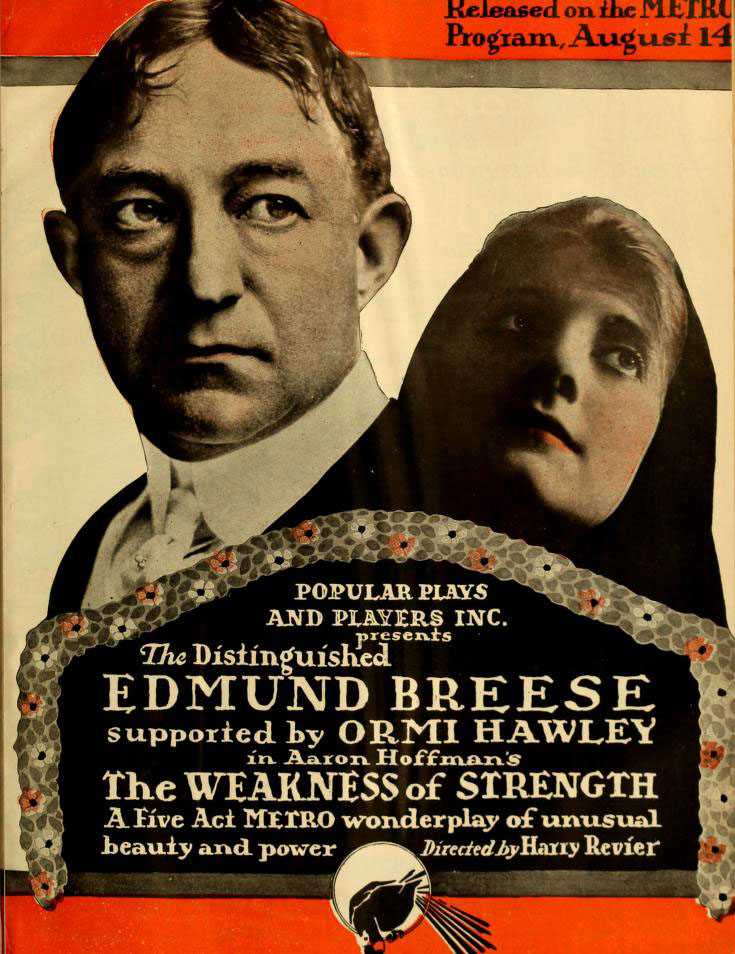
- Advertisement
- Directed by: Harry Revier
- Written by: Wallace Clifton; Aaron Hoffman
- Starring: Edmund Breese
- Cinematography: Joseph Seiden
- Distributed by: Metro Pictures
- Release date: August 20, 1916
- Running time: 50 minutes
- Country: United States
- Language: Silent (English intertitles)

The Weakness of Strength is a 1916 American silent drama film directed by Harry Revier. It is considered to be a lost film.

== Cast ==
- Edmund Breese as Daniel Gaynor
- Clifford Bruce as Bill Jackson
- Ormi Hawley as Mary Alden
- Evelyn Brent as Bessie Alden
- Florence Moore as Little Bessie
- Clifford Grey as Richard Grant (as Clifford B. Gray)

== See also ==
- List of lost films
