= The Heart of the North =

1921 film

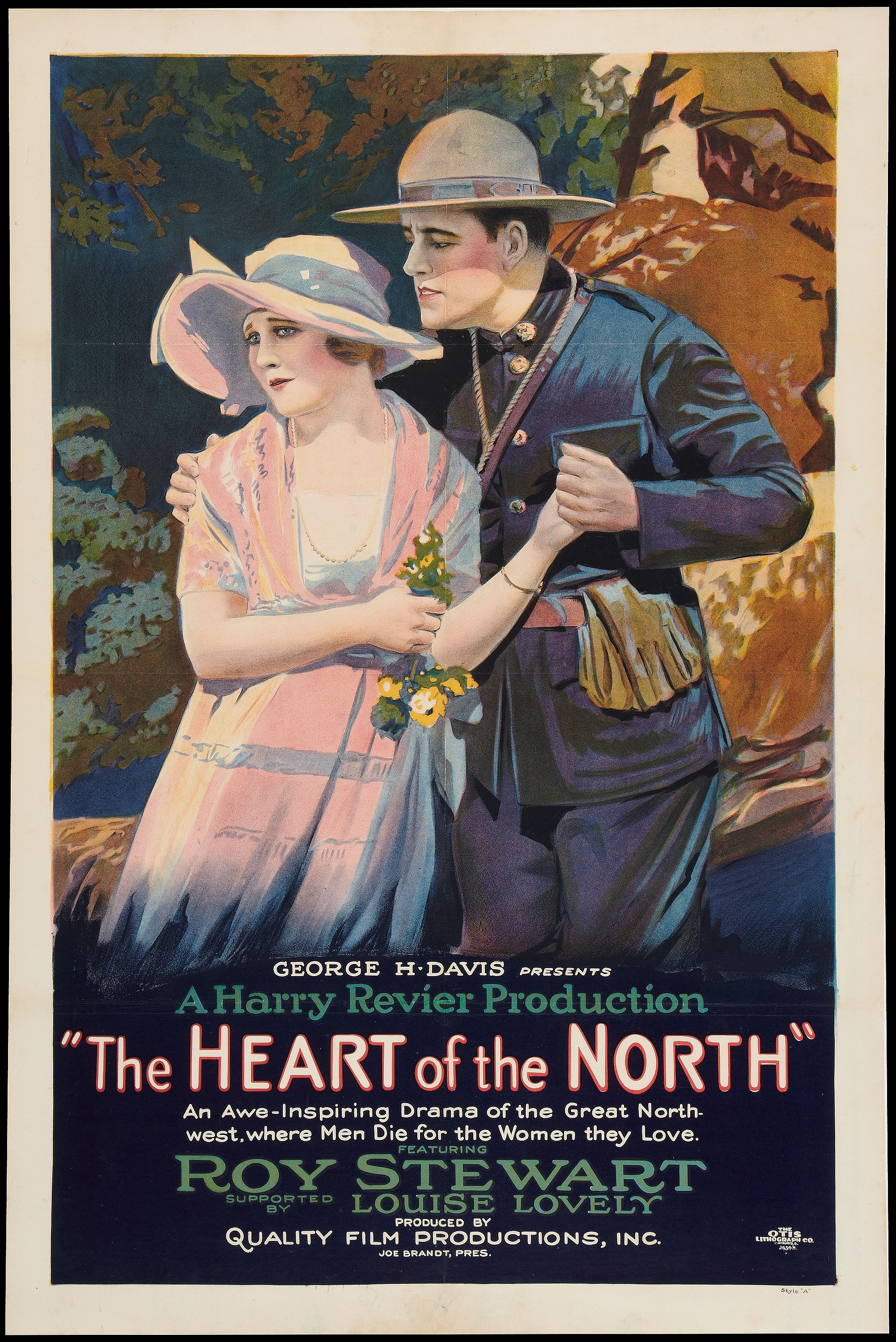
- Directed by: Harry Revier
- Written by: Eddie Dowling
- Produced by: George H. Davis
- Starring: Roy Stewart; Harry von Meter; Louise Lovely
- Cinematography: Lee Humiston
- Production company: Quality Film Productions
- Distributed by: C. B. C. Film Sales
- Release date: September 10, 1921
- Running time: 60 minutes
- Country: United States
- Languages: Silent; English intertitles

The Heart of the North is a 1921 American silent Western film directed by Harry Revier and starring Roy Stewart, Harry von Meter and Louise Lovely. Produced by the independent Quality Film Productions, it is a Northern featuring an officer of the Royal Canadian Mounted Police.

== Cast ==
- Roy Stewart as Sgt. John Whiley / 'Bad' Maupome
- George Morrell as Father Ormounde
- Harry von Meter as De Brac
- Roy Justi as Sir Archibald
- William Lion West as Mad Pierre Maupome
- Louise Lovely as Patricia Graham
- Betty Marvin as Rosa De Brac

== Preservation ==
The film survives in the Library of Congress collection and George Eastman House.

== Bibliography ==
- Munden, Kenneth White. The American Film Institute Catalog of Motion Pictures Produced in the United States, Part 1. University of California Press, 1997.
