= Child Bride =

1938 American film by Harry Revier

- Theatrical release poster
- Directed by: Harry Revier
- Written by: Harry Revier
- Produced by: Raymond L. Friedgen
- Starring: Shirley Mills; Angelo Rossitto; Warner Richmond
- Cinematography: Marcel Le Picard
- Edited by: Helene Turner
- Music by: Felix Mills
- Production company: Astor Pictures
- Distributed by: Astor Pictures
- Release date: March 2, 1938 (United States)
- Running time: 62 minutes
- Country: United States
- Language: English
- Budget: $24,000 (est.)

The film

Child Bride, also known as Child Brides, Child Bride of the Ozarks and Dust to Dust (US reissue titles), is a 1938 American drama film written and directed by Harry Revier, and produced by Raymond L. Friedgen. It was promoted as educational in an attempt to draw attention to the lack of laws banning child marriage in many states.

Set in a remote town in the Ozarks, the film was very controversial at the time—both for its theme and because of a topless and nude swimming scene by then–12-year-old Shirley Mills. The film bypassed the onscreen nudity ban under the Hays Code by being produced and distributed independently of the studio system, and by claiming to be educational. Although the film was banned in many areas, its controversial nature gave it a certain infamy and it played on the so-called exploitation circuit for many years.

Child Bride was one of Revier's last. His previous work included a variety of low-budget, independent features including The Lost City series and Lash of the Penitentes.

== Plot ==
Miss Carol (Diana Durrell) is an idealistic teacher in a remote one-room schoolhouse. A native of the Ozarks herself, she is determined to stop the practice of child marriage, in which older men marry teen or preteen girls. Her campaign raises the ire of some local men, led by Jake Bolby (Warner Richmond), who one night drags her into the woods and ties her to a tree, with the intention of tarring and feathering her. Before this can be done, however, Angelo the dwarf (Angelo Rossitto) and Mr. Colton (George Humphreys) arrive with a shotgun to save the day.

Following this, Jake Bolby comes across young Jennie Colton (Shirley Mills) swimming naked. When her father dies, Bolby decides to take advantage of the opportunity to blackmail her mother into letting him marry the girl, threatening that otherwise he will see her hanged for murder. After he "courts" Jennie by giving her a doll, the two are married. It later turns out that this ceremony was illegal, as child marriage had been banned several days prior, but this point quickly becomes moot. Before Bolby can consummate the union, he is gunned down by Angelo. Jennie leaves his house with Freddie Nulty (Bob Bollinger).

== Cast ==
- Shirley Mills as Jennie Colton (Girl)
- Bob Bollinger as Freddie Nulty (Boy)
- Warner Richmond as Jake Bolby
- Diana Durrell as Miss Carol (Teacher)
- Dorothy Carrol as Flora "Ma" Colton
- George Humphreys as Ira "Pa" Colton
- Frank Martin as Charles, Asst. D.A.
- George Morell (Rex Baxter) as Mike Nulty
- Angelo Rossitto (Don Barrett) as Angelo the dwarf
- Al Bannon as Happy

Cast notes:

- This was Shirley Mills' first role and she would later appear in The Grapes of Wrath in 1940. She would go on to appear in many films over the next decade, mostly in supporting roles. She quit acting in her twenties to become a singer.
- This was Bob Bollinger's only film role. According to Mills' website, now offline, the two young actors became friends, and Bollinger later asked her to marry him, which she declined. His ultimate fate is unknown.
- Angelo Rossitto had a long career in movies, stretching from the 1920s to the 1980s, usually in less heroic roles than in this film. He is perhaps best known for his role as Master in Mad Max: Beyond Thunderdome (1985). The reason he was billed as "Don Barrett" in this film is unknown.
- Along with Mills and Rossitto, Warner Richmond was one of the few actors involved in this film who had any sort of film career. He appeared in over 140 films between 1912 and 1946, including the Gene Autry serial The Phantom Empire (1935).

== The nude swim scene ==
The movie is perhaps best known for the topless and lengthy nude swimming scene by 12-year-old Jennie, which begins with Jennie and Freddie, her closest friend, sneaking slyly to a secluded pond in the woods, where they had swum naked many times in the past. Freddie tells Jennie that he will "beat [her] undressed", but Jennie tells him that they can no longer swim naked together. Freddie asks her why, and Jennie replies "because we're not what we used to be" because she is now grown up. She repeats what she has been told by her teacher, Miss Carol.

Freddie asks how they are different, pointing out that he had seen her many times in the nude, and Jennie turns to answer him, briefly exposing her breasts and nipples to the camera. The film then cuts to a lengthy long shot showing Jennie and Freddie, both topless and separated by a stand of trees, as they discuss how these changes will affect their relationship. Freddie asks if he can still kiss Jennie; she replies that he can but only when she is wearing her clothes.

Jennie then removes her dress entirely, runs naked through the woods and dives into the water. The next two minutes consist of shots of Jennie swimming nude and frolicking with her dog. Jake Bolby appears on a ridge above the pond, and watches the naked girl. An old woman sees what Bolby is doing, and says to him, "Purty, ain't she?" Freddie hears this and alerts Jennie to the fact that someone is watching her, and she swims for cover. She asks Freddie to bring her clothes to her, without looking at her. He uses a long stick to pass her the dress. She pulls the dress on, unseen to the camera, and climbs out of the water.

Some prints and screenings of the film have cut out the topless scene, leaving only the long shot nude swim sequence.

== Production ==
Child Bride was the first film produced by noted exploitation film producer and promoter Kroger Babb, who marketed it as an educational film and who would reissue it under various titles, including Child Brides, Child Bride of the Ozarks and Dust to Dust. The movie is perhaps best known for the lengthy nude child swimming scene, which AllMovie described as "completely gratuitous" and "obviously Child Bride's main selling point and the reason for its longevity on the exploitation circuit."

The film had been submitted to the Production Code Administration for a certificate of approval, but was denied because of its subject matter, which was said to be "a sexually abhorrent abnormality which violates all moral principles", and because of the onscreen child nudity. The censors also objected to the murderer never being punished for his deeds.

The production of the film in 1938 followed shortly after mass media coverage of the 1937 marriage of 9-year-old Eunice Winstead to Charlie Johns, causing the film to be compared to it.

== Home media ==
Alpha Video's DVD release presents the film in its uncensored form, while Mill Creek Entertainment included a censored version of the film in its 20 Movie Pack Cult Classics collection. Kino Lorber has published the uncensored film on Blu-ray as a double feature with Tomorrow's Children. The film is now in the public domain.

== Legacy ==
According to an interview with Mystery Science Theater 3000 writers Michael J. Nelson and Kevin Murphy, Child Bride was considered for potential use, but was considered too awful and disturbing, with Murphy saying that he needed "a good cry and a shower" afterwards. In a separate interview with staff writer Frank Conniff, who was responsible for selecting films for riffing, Child Bride was cited as the worst film watched as a potential selection—alongside Manos: The Hands of Fate, which was used on the series in January 1993.

== See also ==
- List of films in the public domain in the United States
- Nudity in film
