= The Slaver =

1927 film directed by Harry Revier

- Directed by: Harry Revier
- Written by: Mabel Z. Carroll; James Oliver Curwood (story)
- Produced by: Morris R. Schlank
- Starring: Pat O'Malley; Carmelita Geraghty; John Miljan
- Cinematography: Dal Clawson
- Production company: Morris R. Schlank Productions
- Distributed by: Anchor Film Distributors
- Release date: December 7, 1927
- Country: United States
- Languages: Silent; English intertitles

The Slaver is a 1927 American drama film directed by Harry Revier and starring Pat O'Malley, Carmelita Geraghty and John Miljan.

== Summary ==
On the coast of Africa, the captain of a ship is about to make a deal to sell a white captive to an African chief as a slave. A cabin boy who discovers the captain's plans determines to thwart them and save the girl.

== Cast ==
- Pat O'Malley as Dick Farnum
- Carmelita Geraghty as Natalie Rivers
- John Miljan as Cyril Blake
- J.P. McGowan as 'Iron' Larsen
- Billie Bennett as Mrs. Rivers
- William Earle as Gumbo
- Leo White
- Philip Sleeman

== Bibliography ==
- Munden, Kenneth White. The American Film Institute Catalog of Motion Pictures Produced in the United States, Part 1. University of California Press, 1997.
