= Nude swimming =

Swimming without clothing

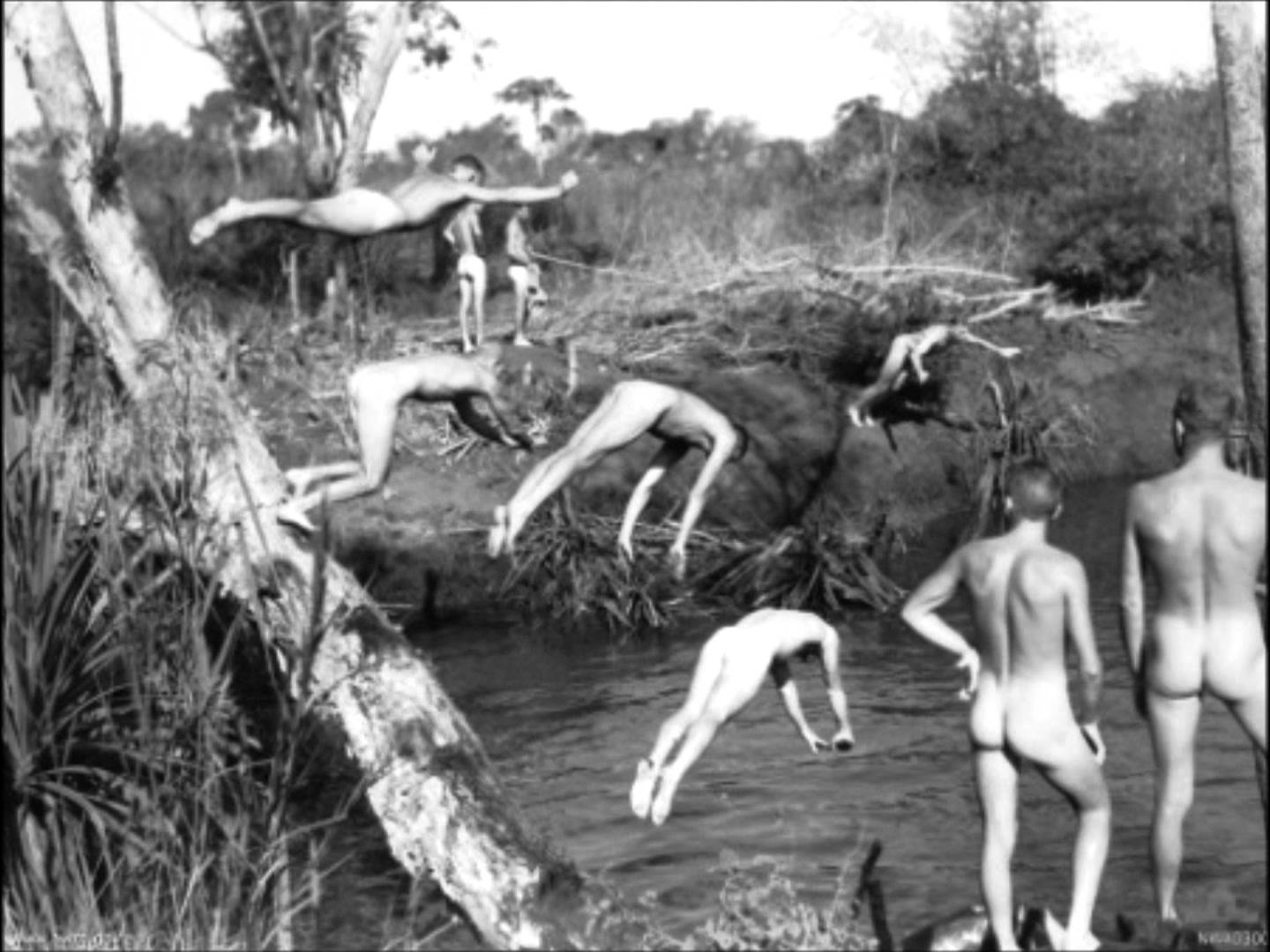
Members of the Royal Australian Air Force diving into a river, 1943

Nude swimming is the practice of swimming without clothing, whether in natural bodies of water or in swimming pools. "Skinny dipping" is a colloquial term for nude swimming.

In prehistory and for much of ancient history, both swimming and bathing were done without clothing. In Western societies into the 20th century, nude swimming was common for men and boys, particularly in male-only contexts; however, swimwear began to be expected in mixed-sex environments. The widespread acceptance of naturism in many European countries led to legal recognition of clothing-optional swimming in locations open to the public.

Nude swimming has been depicted in art and in film.

== History ==
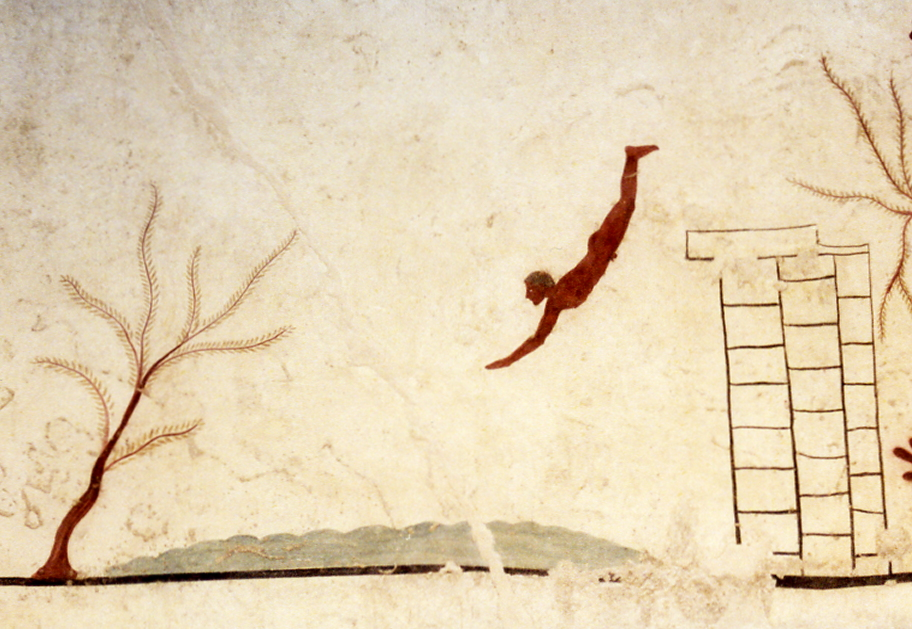
Fresco "Tomb of the Diver" – Paestum, Italy, c. 470 BCE

Based upon rock painting found in caves, the human activity of swimming existed for many thousands of years prior to the first civilizations, during which humans were generally naked.

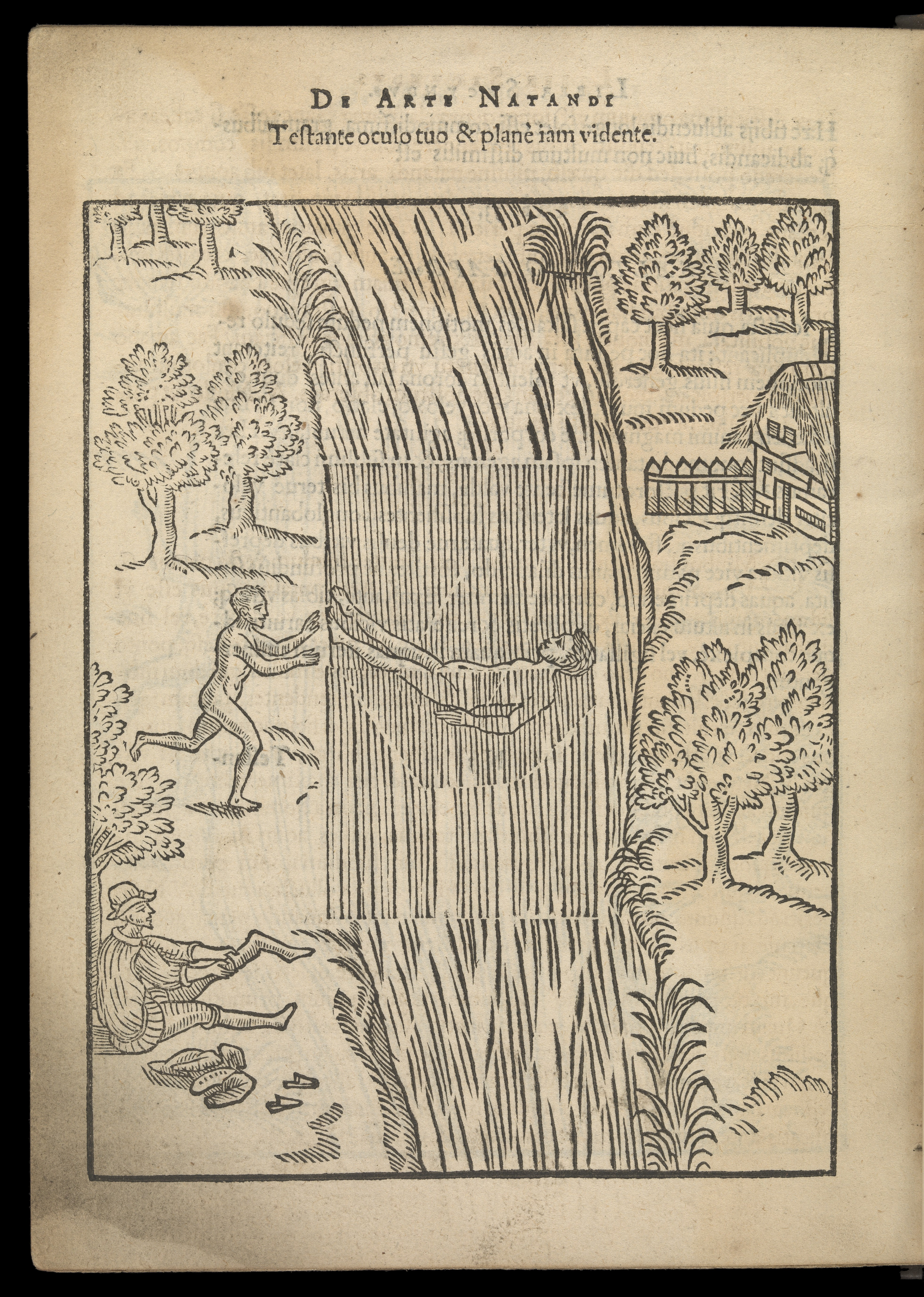
Illustration from Everard Digby's The Art of Swimming (De Arte Natandi) (1587)

=== Ancient to early modern ===
In Ancient Egypt, clothing was symbolic of social status, making adult nudity an indicator of low status or poverty. However, children, even of the upper classes, would be naked until puberty. Manual laborers of either sex would wear a loincloth or skirt unless their tasks included swimming; fishermen and boatmen often being nude.

In ancient Rome, clothing also represented social status, but public bathhouses were an exception. Bathhouses might include swimming pools that were located in open courtyards.

Swimming became increasingly unpopular after the fall of the Western Roman Empire, being viewed by the Christian church as both sinful and unhealthy. In spite of church teaching, swimming and bathing returned in the 12th century, sometimes without segregation of the sexes. Defying the Church of England, Everard Digby's book The Art of Swimming (De Arte Natandi) was published in 1587. Melchisédech Thévenot's 1696 instruction book, also called The Art of Swimming, was illustrated by 40 copperplate etchings that showed swimming was normally nude.

Indigenous peoples swimming naked were depicted by colonists in the Americas beginning in the 16th century.

=== Modern era ===
==== Australia ====
In the Victorian era, public baths and swimming pools were built in Adelaide to address problems of health and safety, but also to reduce the persistence of nude swimming in open waters. Swimming costumes were issued to pool patrons.

==== England ====
Modest clothing for bathing or swimming was not considered until the 15th century, when women began wearing bathing dresses and men linen drawers. In male-only groups, men continued to swim nude in rivers and the sea until the mid-19th century. The Bath Corporation official bathing dress code of 1737 prohibited men and women from swimming nude either in the day or in the night.

In the early 1730s, fashionable sea bathing initially followed the inland health-seeking tradition. Sea bathing resorts modelled themselves on Bath, and provided promenades, circulating libraries, and assembly rooms. While sea bathing or dipping, men and boys were naked, women and girls were encouraged to dip wearing loose clothing. Scarborough was the first resort to provide bathing machines for changing. Some men extended this to swimming in the sea, and by 1736, it was seen at Brighton and Margate, and later at Deal, Eastbourne, and Portsmouth.

In England, bathing in the sea by the lower classes was noted in Southampton by Thomas Gray in 1764, and in Exmouth in 1779. In Lancashire, working women and men bathed naked in the sea together in 1795: "Lower classes of people of both sexes made an annual pilgrimage to Liverpool where they dabbled in the salt water for hours at each tide in promiscuous numbers and not much embarrassing themselves about appearance."

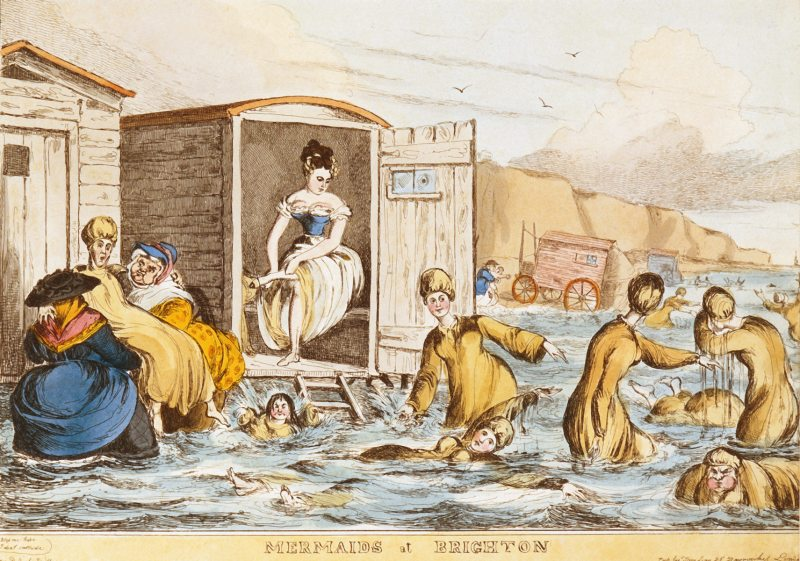
"Mermaids at Brighton" by William Heath, c. 1829, depicts women sea bathing with bathing machines.

At the beginning of the Victorian period in England, men and boys typically swam naked in the sea near bathing machines that were used by women. Some efforts were made to designate separate beach sections for males and females. An 1842 review of seaside resorts noted that naked men in the sea were a primary attraction for visitors to Ramsgate, including women. The writer finds this no different from women viewing images of nude men in art galleries, near-naked men in the opera, or workers in the water. On the River Cherwell near the University of Oxford, an area for male nude bathing was known as Parson's Pleasure.

In the latter half of the 19th century, the rise of the influence of Christian Evangelicals caused arrangements for mixed bathing to be reassessed. Moral pressures led some town councils to establish zones for the women and men to bathe separately. These areas were not policed; mixed bathing was a popular activity. Resorts attempted to placate the Evangelicals without upsetting traditional bathers. There are very few records of magistrates enforcing the bylaws. In 1895, Cosmopolitan reported: "At most English resorts, buff bathing is available before eight o'clock in the morning" while Brighton, Worthing, Hastings, Bexhill, Bognor and Folkestone still tolerated nude bathing at any time of the day, in areas away from the central bathing areas.

However at Margate, the conventions regarding both gender segregation and male nudity were ignored, resulting in what was called "promiscuous bathing"; clothed women in the same location as naked men. Rather than being avoided, beach-goers gathered to enjoy the spectacle, often using telescopes.

Drawers, or caleçons as they were called (fr:caleçon de bain), came into use in the 1860s. Even then, many protested against them and wanted to remain in the nude. Rev. Francis Kilvert, an English clergyman and nude swimmer, described men's bathing suits coming into use in the 1870s as "a pair of very short red and white striped drawers". Excerpts from Kilvert's diary show the transition in the England of the 1870s from an acceptance of nude bathing to the acceptance of bathing suits. Kilvert describes "a delicious feeling of freedom in stripping in the open air and running down naked to the sea."

In 1895, The Daily Telegraph, Standard, Daily Graphic and Daily Mail newspapers ran a campaign to reintroduce mixed bathing in all resorts, pointing out that its prohibition split up families and encouraged them to take their holidays abroad. Commercial pressure defeated the moral pressures. Sea bathing had ceased to be done for health reasons and was done overwhelmingly for pleasure. As the segregated beaches in town disappeared, bathing costumes for men became part of the commercial package, and nude bathing ceased.

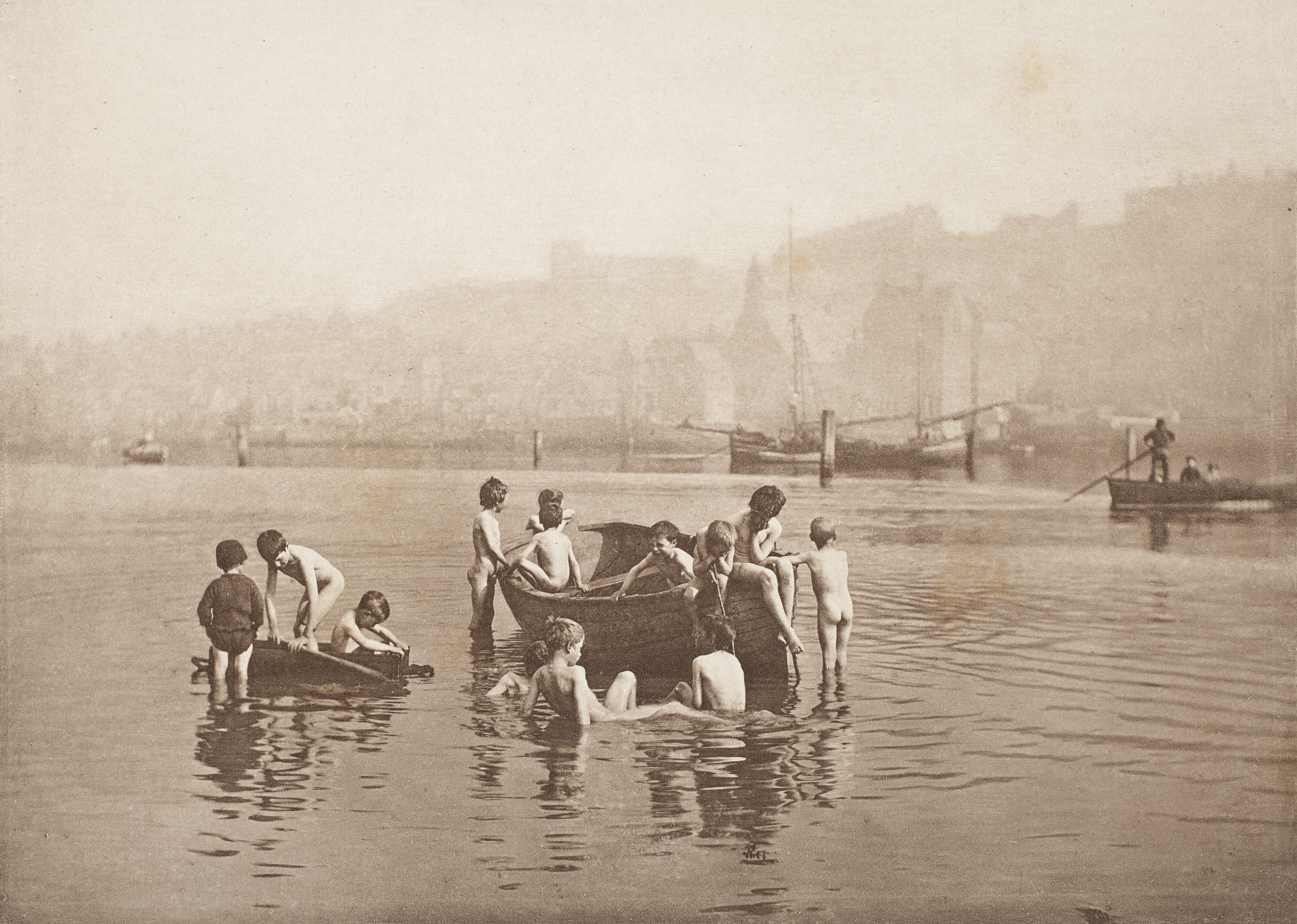
"Water Rats", Francis Sutcliffe, 1886

The introduction of mixed bathing throughout Europe and elsewhere certainly created pressure towards bathing costumes being worn by both genders. However, well into the latter days of the Victorian Era, whereas all females were routinely wearing modest bathing attire, many boys well into their teens in Victorian England, even when in a mixed gender setting, were still swimming and playing at the beach resorts completely naked. An article published on August 23, 1891, in the Syracuse Sunday Herald suggests naked boys of up to 15 years in age were problematic for American parents with daughters, and read:

A 'Bewildered American' writes to the London Standard that he can't take his little girl to play in the sand at a British seaside resort without her being surrounded by crowds of naked boys. An English friend told him that they let their daughters play with naked boys of ten years of age, but draw the line at fifteen.

==== South Africa ====
From 1873, the East London, Eastern Cape town council promulgated measures to control swimming hours, apparel and especially separate swimming areas for men and women. These regulations were too conservative and constraining for the taste of the residents of this coastal town and for several decades they were the subject of legal battles, or were simply ignored. The dispute was finally settled in 1906 when mixed bathing was permitted with the proviso that both men and women should wear suitable swimming costumes.

== 20th century ==
Since the early 20th century, the naturist movement has developed in western countries, seeking a return to non-sexual nudity when swimming and during other appropriate activities.

=== Canada ===
In the late 19th to early 20th century, using tax revenue to provide public bathing facilities for working-class men was not politically popular in London, Ontario, while private establishments served the middle and upper classes. These included swimming at the YMCA, which required membership or payment of fees. However, the problem of men being publicly naked while swimming and bathing in open water was recognized. Efforts to regulate nude swimming with laws against doing so during daylight hours did not prevent increases in incidents in the 1860s through the 1880s by laborers and boys.

In the 19th century, boys and working-class men in Toronto swimming nude in the Humber and Don Rivers was allowed in secluded swimming holes, while officially prohibited elsewhere. "Skinny dipping" (a colloquial term for nude swimming) was seen by many as an innocent activity for young males, as long as it did not intrude upon the sensibilities of females. In the 20th century, urban growth had encroached upon this isolation, and also created the problem of water pollution. The development of beaches in the Sunnyside district on the Lake Ontario waterfront marked the end of nude outdoor swimming.

As in the United States, men swam nude at YMCAs until they became coed.

=== China ===
In 2004 after some local university students went skinny dipping there, signs were placed at a riverside beach in a public park in Zhejiang province declaring a section to be a nudist beach. Following complaints from other park visitors, the signs were removed, although officially China has no law forbidding swimming nude. In a July 2005 heat wave, a number of incidents of men skinny dipping were noted.

=== England ===
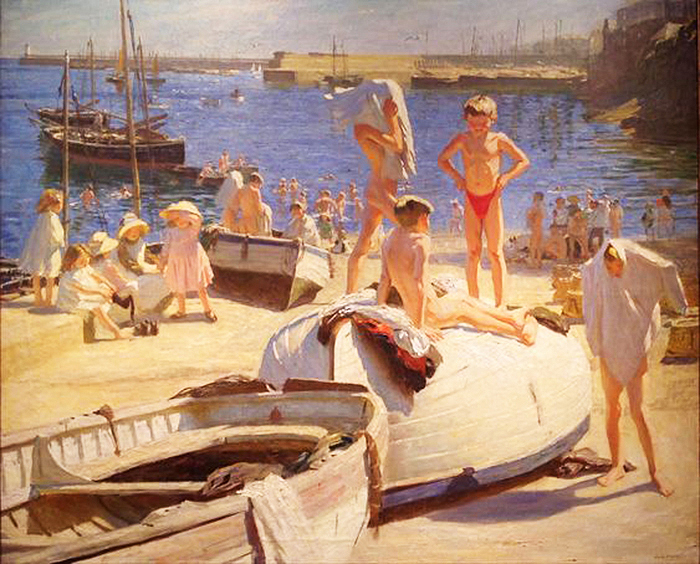
Laura Knight – "Boys" – Cornwall, 1910. Naked boys casually lounging and playing in sea with dressed girls.

In English boys' schools (Manchester Grammar School, for example), students recall nude swimming being required at least from the 1930s until the 1970s. No official reason for the practice was given, but some mention the problem in the early years of fibres from wool swimsuits clogged pool filters. However, nude swimming continued when modern swimsuit materials were available.

In a less formal setting, young boys might be nude in mixed company, as shown in a home movie of an outing featuring young Brownies, Girl Guides and Scouts playing in the grounds of a stately home in 1940s Britain. While the girls and older boys wore suits, the boys of about 10 years of age played in the river naked.

Children swimming in early 20th century England
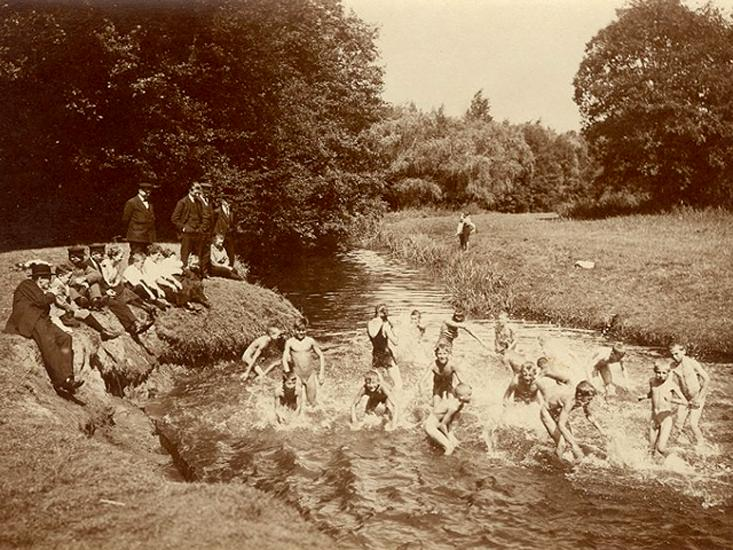
In England, boys swimming nude and girls in suits, 1910

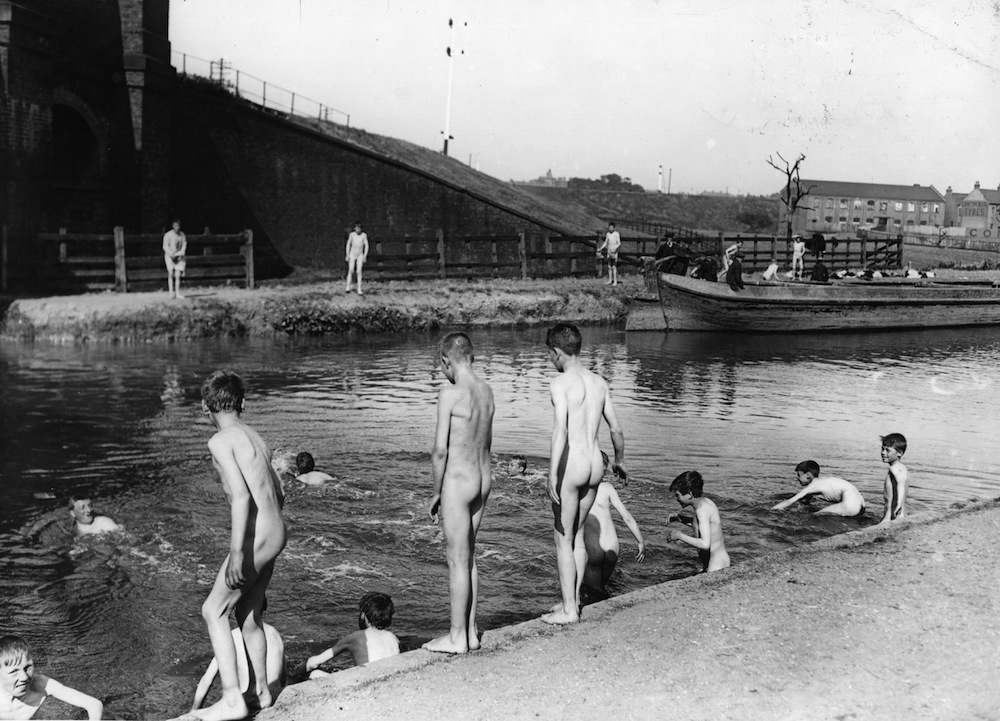
Boys swimming nude in Regents canal during a heatwave, 1911

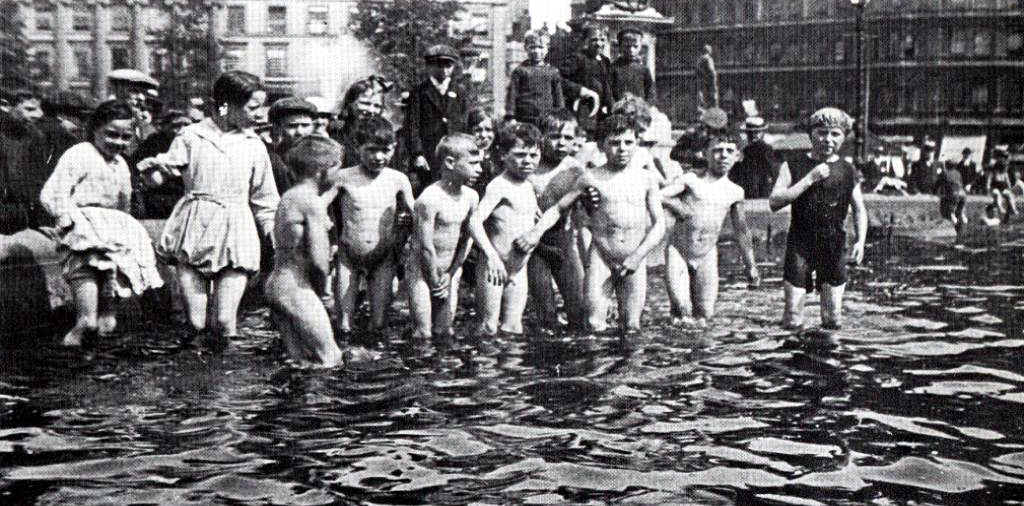
Naked boys, clothed girls in Trafalgar Square, c. 1912

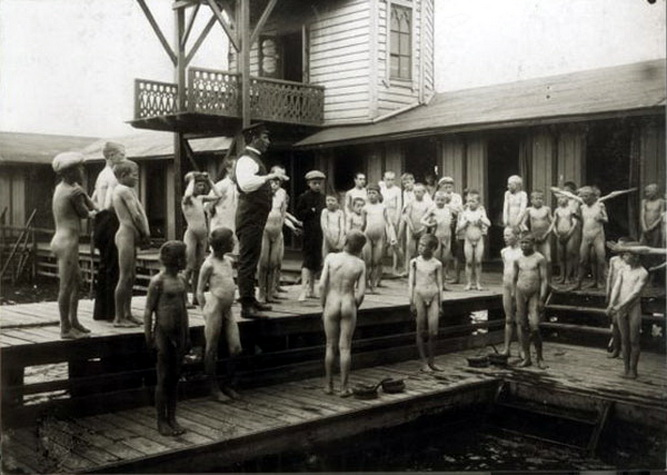
Swim class for boys, England, c. 1914

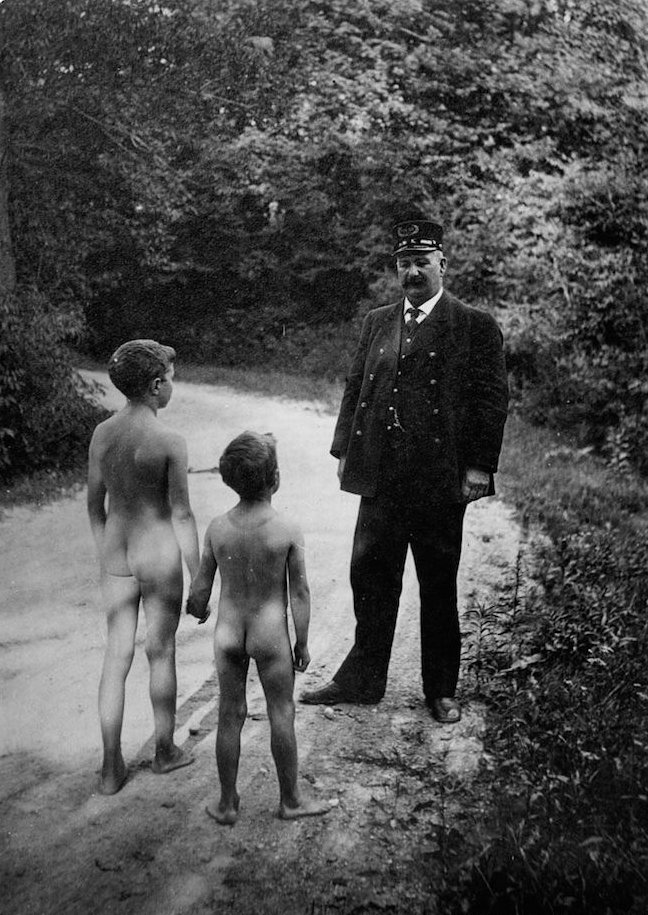
Two nude boys walking down road to a swimming hole, 1919

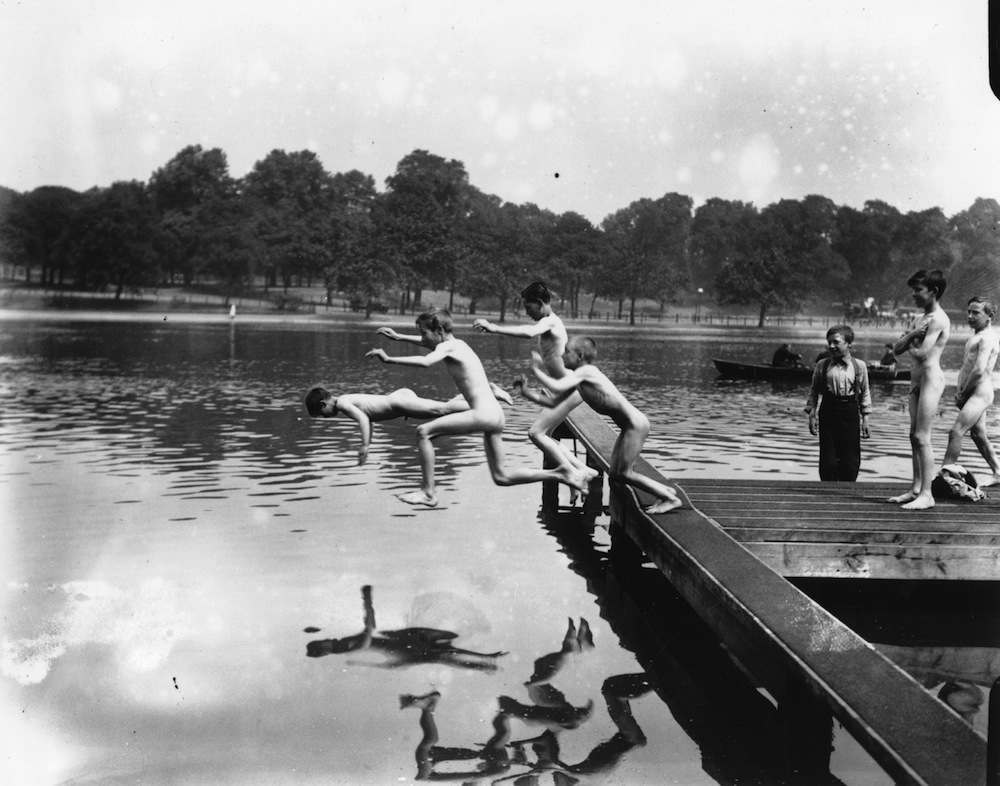
A group of naked boys jumping into a lake in Hyde Park during a heat wave, 1920

=== Germany ===
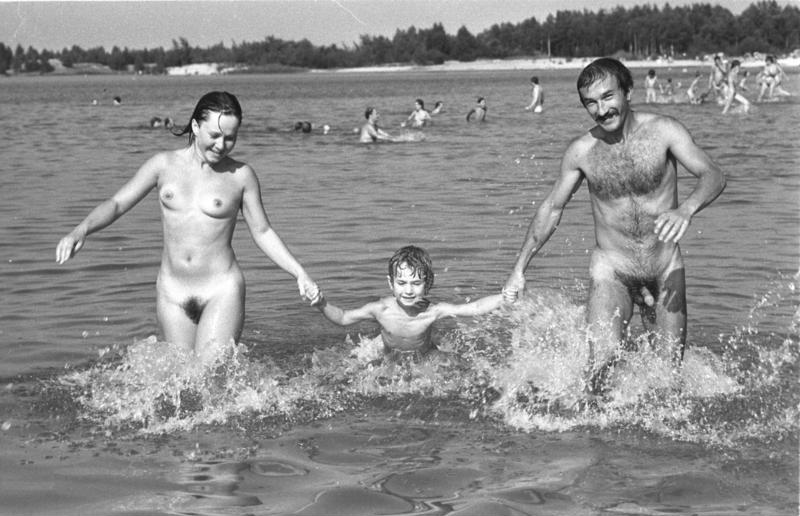
Nude swimmers at Lake Senftenberg, East Germany, 1983

Mixed gender nude swimming in lakes, rivers and on sea beaches following World War I was part of the social liberalization in the Weimar Republic. Some swimmers were part of the organized naturist movement (Freikörperkultur), others sought only an escape from economic and political turmoil. Economic problems had eliminated support for swimming pools and other recreational facilities, these needs being replaced by "wild swimming" in natural bodies of water.

In planning for the 1976 Summer Olympics in Montreal, the West German swim coach suggested that men's events be nude, which cut seconds from their times. The suggestion was not taken seriously by Olympic officials.

=== Greece ===
In the 1870s, sea bathing at the Athenian seafront was an activity dominated by working class men who swam naked. With the beginning of the 20th century, resorts for the middle class were established, a transition which was at odds with male nudity. This was dealt with by having separate male and female bathing areas, but these became difficult to enforce. In the 1910s, mixed gender bathing began, and became actual swimming away from shore rather that wading. Female beach attire became "semi-nude" by the standard of prior years, exposing women's arms and legs.

=== United States ===
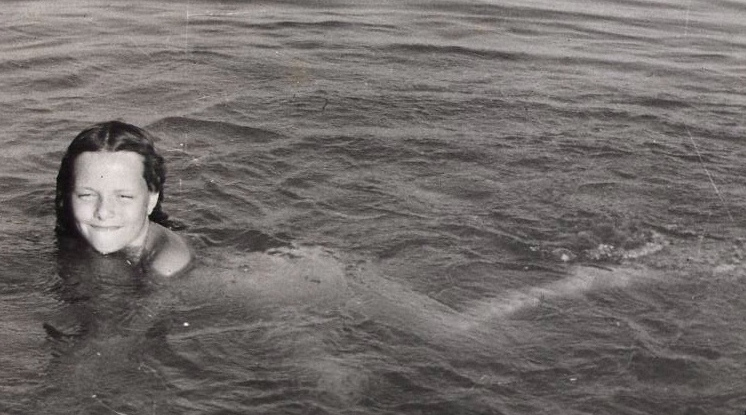
A girl swimming nude in a lake in 1942

The 18th, 19th, and early 20th centuries saw the rise of a subculture of boys and young men who swam nude in any available body of water. This extended to well-known historical figures; Benjamin Franklin and John Quincy Adams were known to skinny dip. U.S. President Theodore Roosevelt described nude swims in the Potomac with his "tennis cabinet" in his Autobiography: "If we swam the Potomac, we usually took off our clothes".

As towns such as Logan, Utah, Humboldt, Iowa, and Dixon, Illinois, grew in the 1890s, the traditional locations became more visible to the public, and local ordinances were implemented prohibiting nude swimming, but were difficult to enforce, or involved very young children who did not receive punishment. In 1850, Grand Rapids, Michigan addressed the issue of both men and women swimming nude in the Grand River by passing an ordinance allowing the activity only at night, between 8 pm and 5 am. In 1907, Nashville, Tennessee deputy sheriffs took no action to stop men and boys from swimming nude in the Cumberland River outside of populated areas.

The 1927 California Channel Swim between Catalina Island and the mainland was declared clothing optional by the sponsor, William Wrigley. Two Black American swimmers stated their intention to swim nude, as did several other women, saying the suits available were a handicap. In the 1927 Lake George 24 mile marathon, suits were optional if swimmers chose to cover their bodies with grease.

Outdoor nude swimming in isolated American summer camps also existed as a socially accepted practice usually, but not always, segregated by gender. Ernest Thompson Seton describes skinny dipping as one of the first activities of his Woodcraft Indians, a forerunner of the Scout movement, in 1902. A 1937 article on swimming at Boy Scout summer camps in Washington makes no mention of the boys being naked in almost all the photographs. Descriptions of special "carnival" days that were coed did not mention whether swimsuits were available. It does state "Both boys and girls enjoy the thrill of swimming in the nude, so on occasion, suits may be discarded for the night plunge." Night swimming was allowed only in camps where this was safe. In 1937, boys swimming nude in creeks of Atlanta, Georgia received only warnings.

An editorial mentions the removal of forests in rural Vermont being that sheltered ponds where boys had been swimming naked for 200 years during the 1970s. Older residents of Duncanville, Texas, remembered the "Blue Hole" on Ten Mile Creek a few hundred feet west of Main Street as the place to skinny dip for decades. In 1967, misbehavior including drinking, fighting, and accidents led to complaints and calls to make the place off-limits.

Outdoor nude swimming in early America
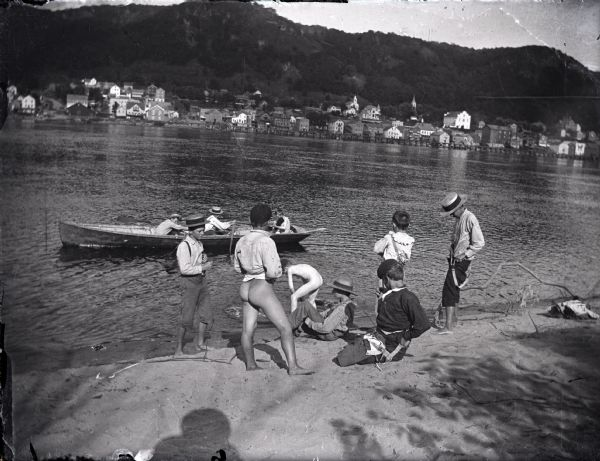
Boys take off their clothes for nude swimming in the Mississippi River in Wisconsin (1900)

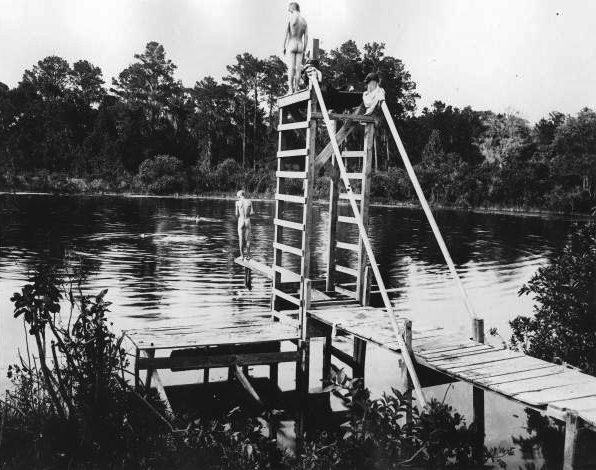
Two boys prepare to dive into a lake near Gainesville, Florida (c.1900)

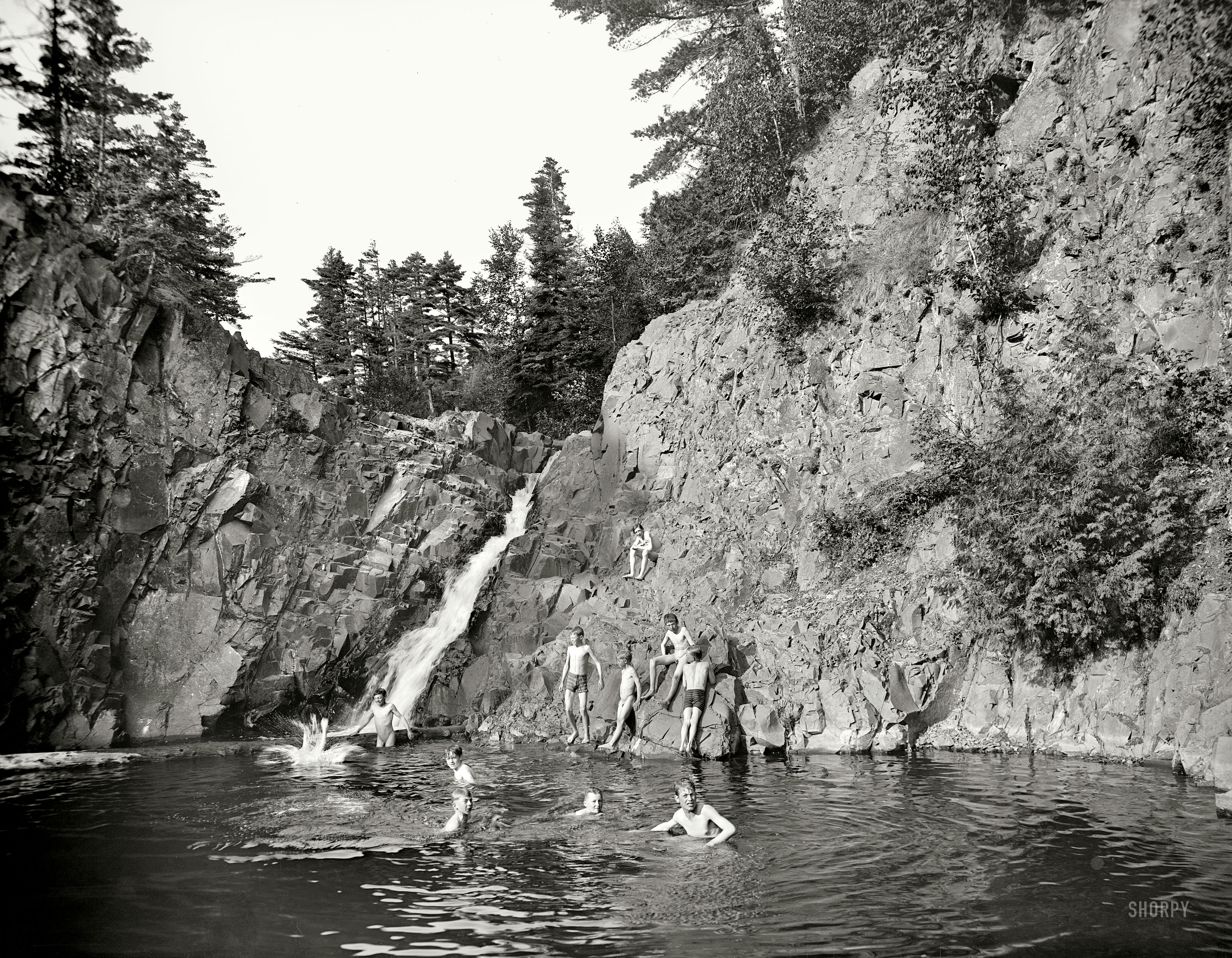
A group of children swim nude in Duluth, Minnesota (1904)

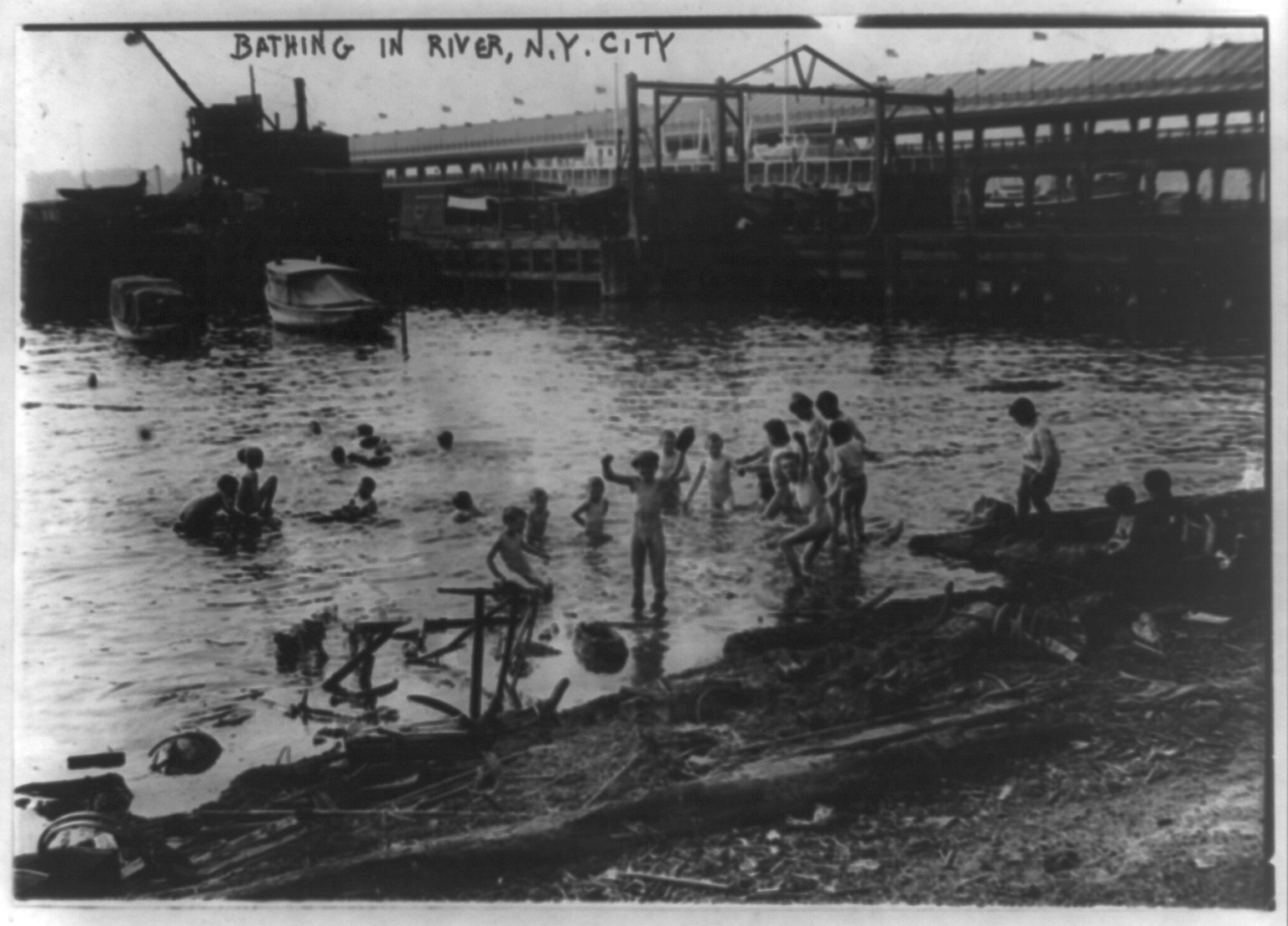
Children swimming nude in the East River, New York City (c.1908)

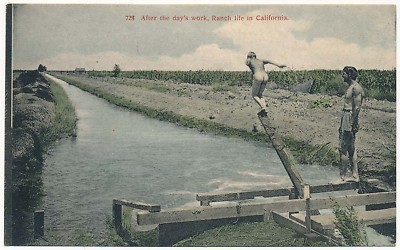
A nude boy jumping into an agricultural ditch in California (c. 1910)

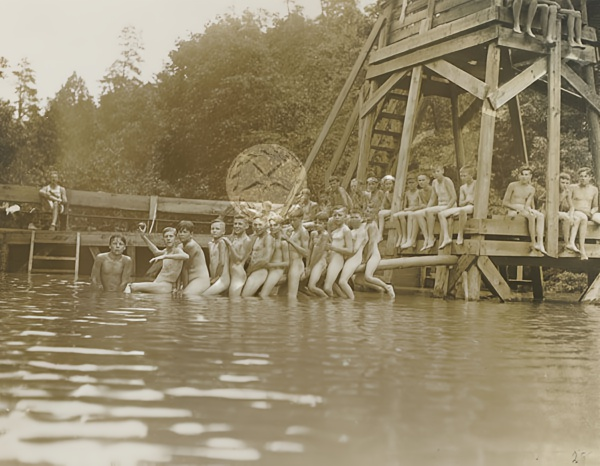
Nude swimming at Camp Dixie for Boys in Wiley, Georgia (1925)

==== Swimming in indoor pools ====
As urbanization in the Northern United States brought outdoor nude swimming into public view, cities and towns responded by constructing swimming pools that continued the practice indoors. American YMCAs had nude swimming from the 1890s until gender desegregation in the 1960s. The unavailability of chlorination encouraged nude swimming in indoor swimming pools to maintain hygiene. In 1933, all bathers needed to urinate and shower before entering the pool nude. In 1940, health experts continued to favor boys wearing bathing suits only in pools visible to both sexes. Girls wore cotton suits that could be boiled to disinfect them between uses; wool suits that had previously been used in salt water could not be washed effectively because salt prevents soap from lathering. In 1926, the American Public Health Association (APHA) standards handbook recommended that indoor swimming pools used by men adopt nude bathing policies and that indoor swimming pools used by women require swimsuits "of the simplest type". Swimming pool owners discouraged boys from bringing their own swimming suits because the institutions could not control decontamination.

In 1947, girls at the Liberty School in Highland Park, Michigan, also swam nude in their classes. As boys had not worn suits for years, girls requested to do the same to give them more time in the pool by eliminating changing. After six weeks, officials ordered the girls in the middle school to wear suits, but the elementary school girls continued to swim nude. While following the wishes of parents who believed older girls should behave modestly, all the board members disagreed, stating that there was "no moral issue involved".

White residents often excluded African Americans from these nude swimming locations through a pseudoscientific claim stating that African Americans served as disease vectors and could easily transmit infectious diseases to white Americans. A strict social taboo against interracial relationships also prohibited African American men and boys, even if not nude, from swimming in front of white women and girls. Several instances of violence erupted when African Americans entered formerly segregated facilities during the civil rights movement.

New developments in pool chlorination, filtration, and nylon swimsuits led the APHA to abandon its recommendation of nude swimming for males in 1962. However, the custom did not immediately cease. During the 1970s, the adoption of mixed-gender swimming led to the gradual abandonment of nude male swimming in schools. Federal Title IX rules mandating equality in physical education led most schools to switch to co-educational gym classes by 1980, ending nude swimming in public schools. In the 21st century, the practice has been forgotten, denied having existed, or viewed as an example of questionable behaviors in the past that are no longer acceptable. However, Jungian psychoanalyst Barry Miller views the sexualization of nudity in male-only situations such as locker rooms and swimming pools as a loss of a healthy practice.

Indoor nude swimming in 20th century America
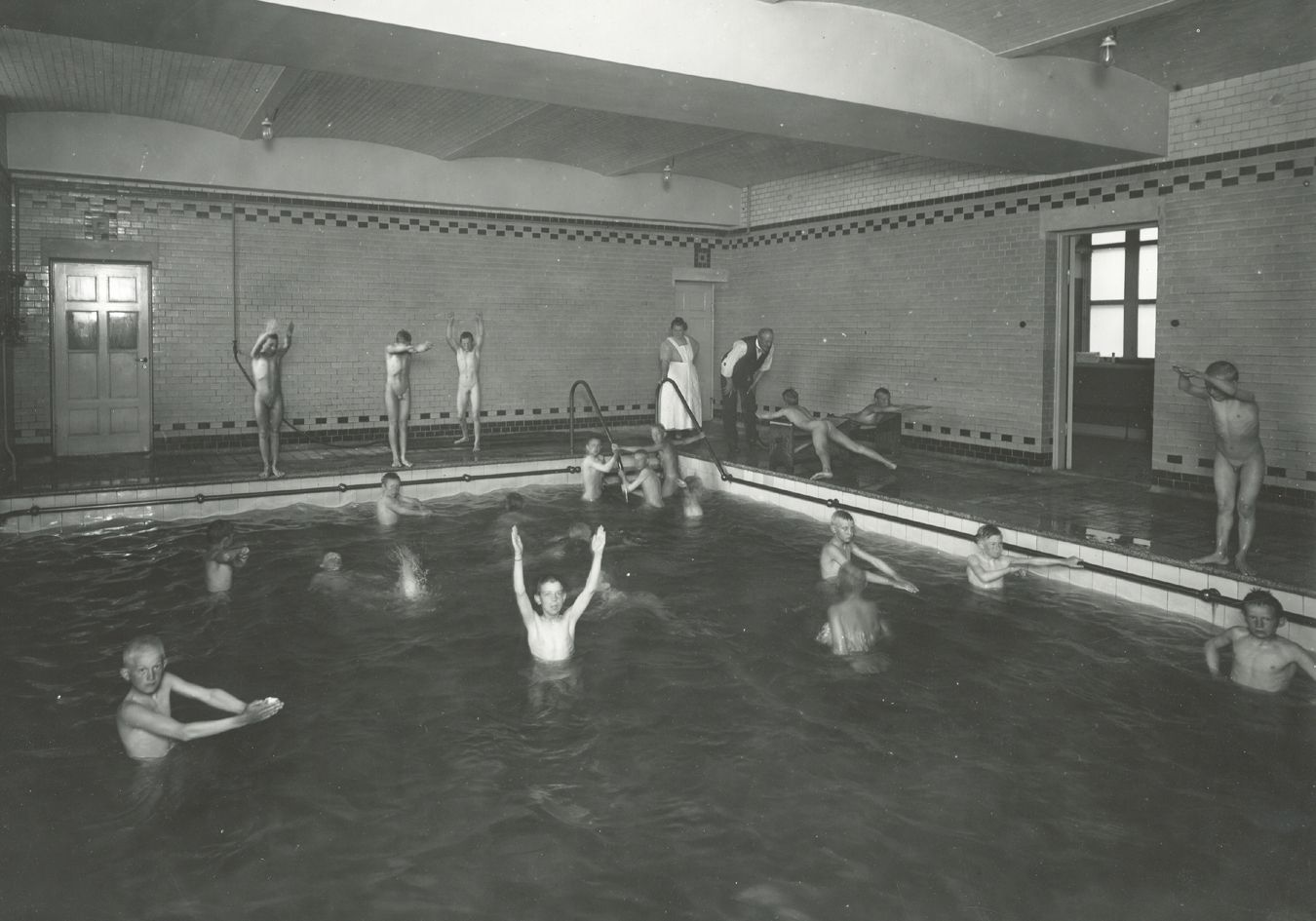
Man and woman teaching boys how to swim (1902)

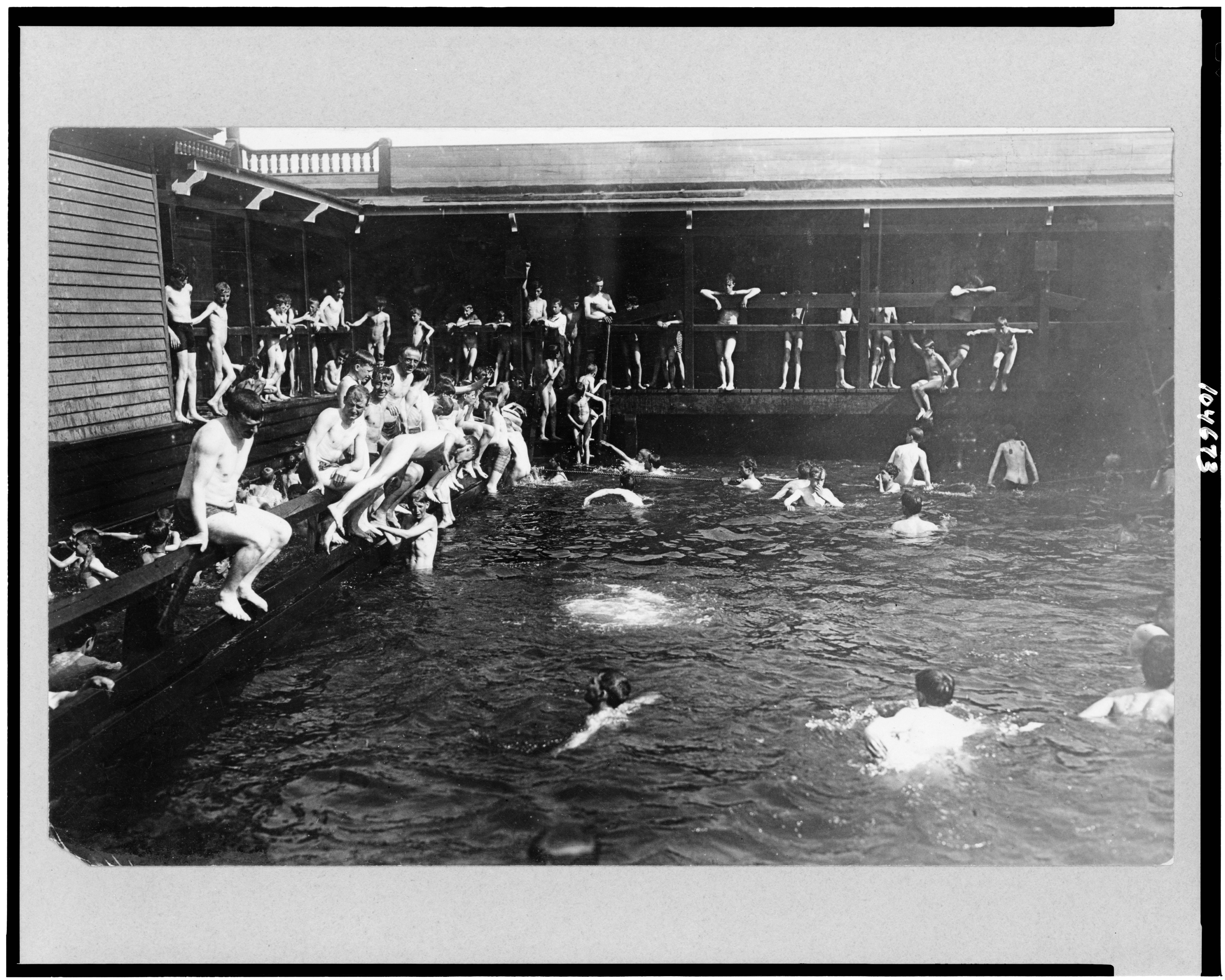
Swimming at The Battery, New York City (1908)

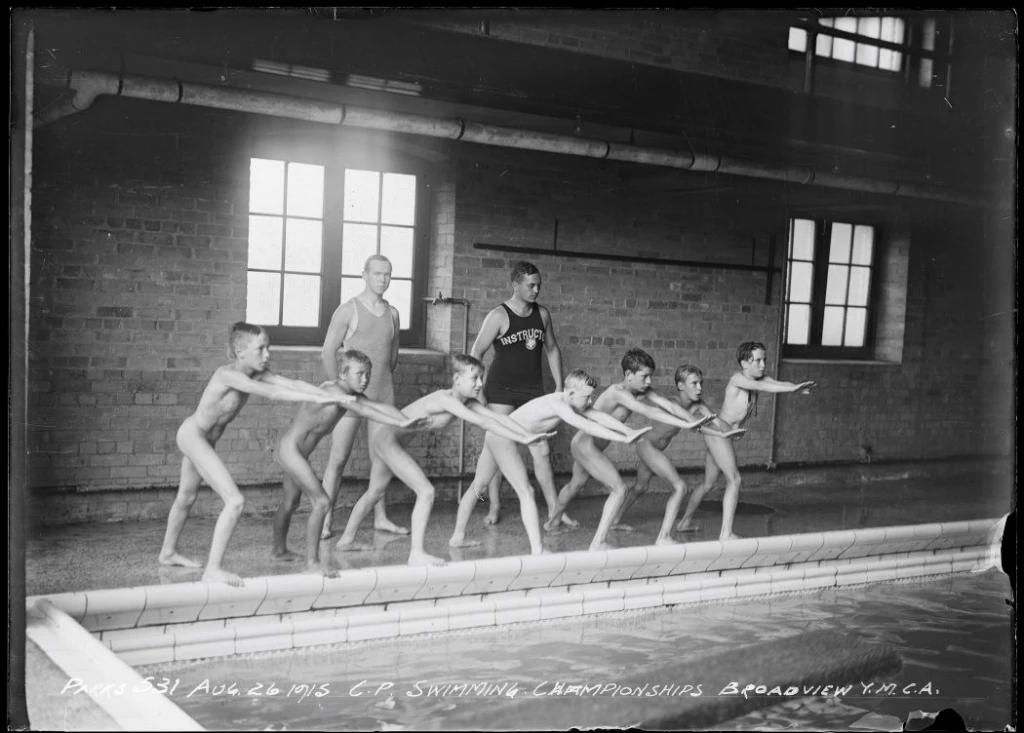
A swim lesson in a YMCA (1915)

== 21st century practices ==
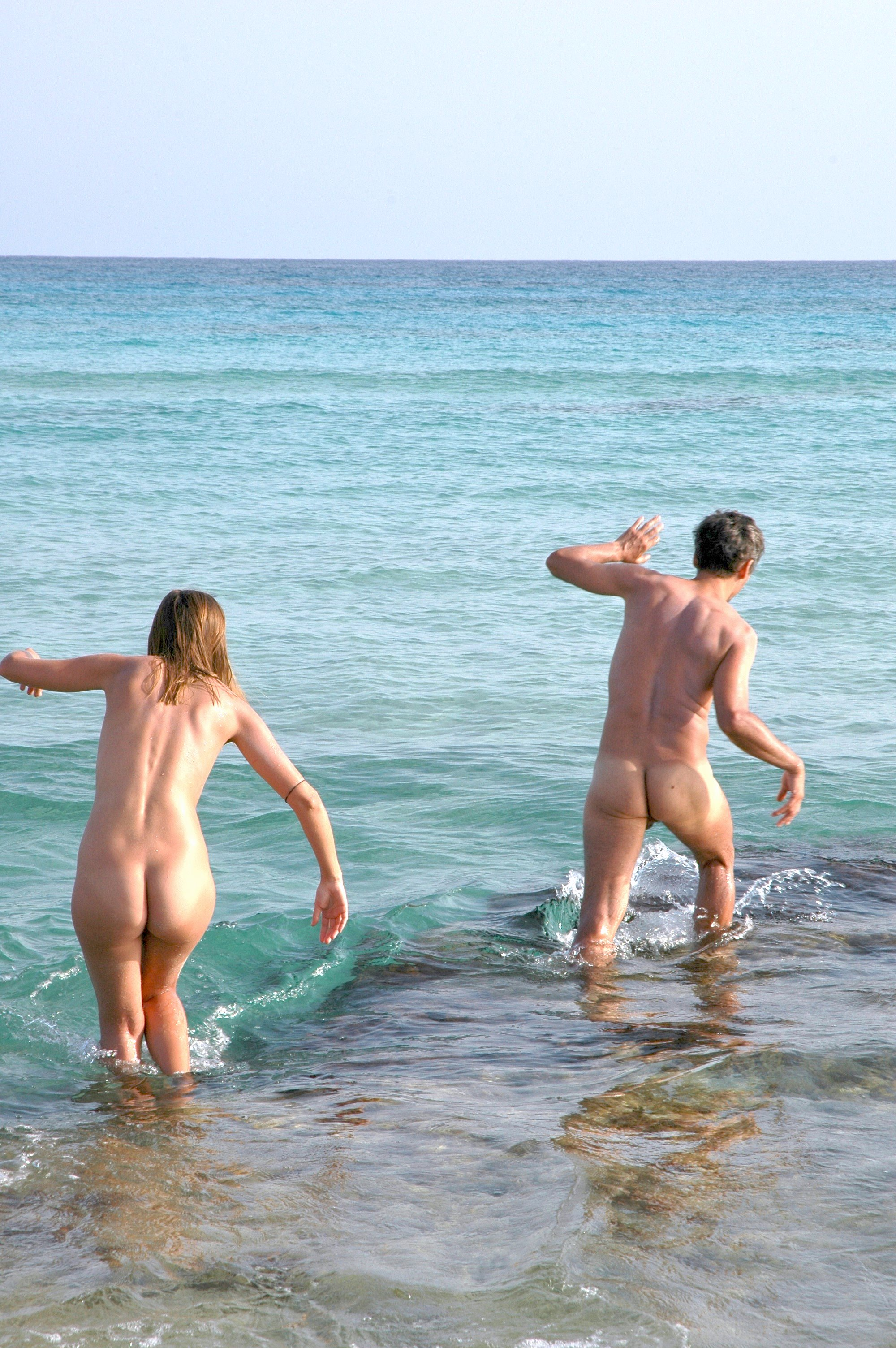
Nude man and woman entering the water at Formentera Beach, Spain

In many countries in the 21st century, nude swimming mostly takes place at nude beaches, naturist facilities, private swimming pools, or secluded or segregated public swimming areas. Nude swimming remains common and socially accepted in a significant number of developing countries. Some countries around the world strictly enforce various laws against public nudity, including nude swimming. Some jurisdictions which maintain laws against public nudity may ignore incidents of skinny dipping depending on the circumstances.

A 2006 Roper poll showed that 25% of all American adults had swum nude at least once, and that 74% believed nude swimming should be tolerated at accepted locations. Nude swimming is fairly common in rural areas of the United States, where unexpected visitors are less likely. However, in some places, even that type of swimming is prohibited by law. There is no federal law against nudity. Nude beaches such as Baker Beach in San Francisco operate within federal park lands in California. However, under a provision called concurrent jurisdiction, federal park rangers may enforce state and local laws against nudity or invite local authorities to do so. Skinny dippers generally deal with this by keeping an eye out for local patrols, who generally do not go out of their way to find violators. Many swimmers in the United States confine nude swimming to private locations due to concerns about attitudes to public nudity.

In Germany, nude bathing is more widespread than in many other countries. A 2014 study revealed Germans (28%) were the most likely of all nations surveyed to have been nude at a beach. As urban rivers in Europe become cleaner, and residents more often seek relief from rising temperatures, many swim or sunbathe nude.

The world record for the largest skinny dip—2,505 persons—was set on 9 June 2018 at Meaghermore beach in County Wicklow, Ireland. The record was set at an annual all-women's event known as Strip and Dip, which was created by cancer survivor Deirdre Featherstone. The 2018 event raised money for a national children's cancer charity.

Nude swimming in the 21st century
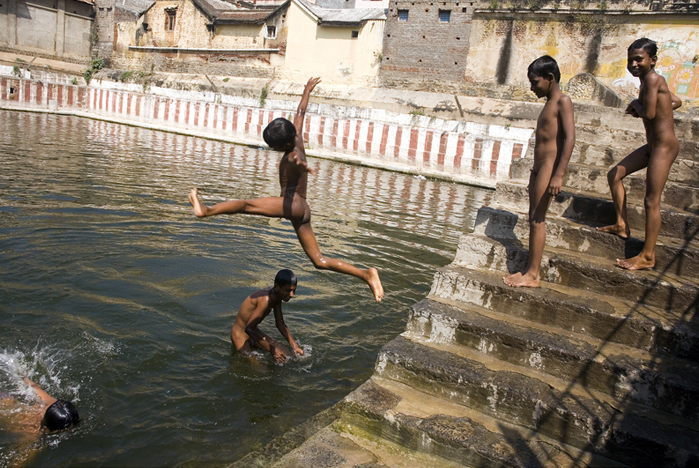
Boys nude swimming in a sacred tank in Tiruvannamalai, India (2006)

Young boys playing joyfully in the mud in Bangladesh (2008)

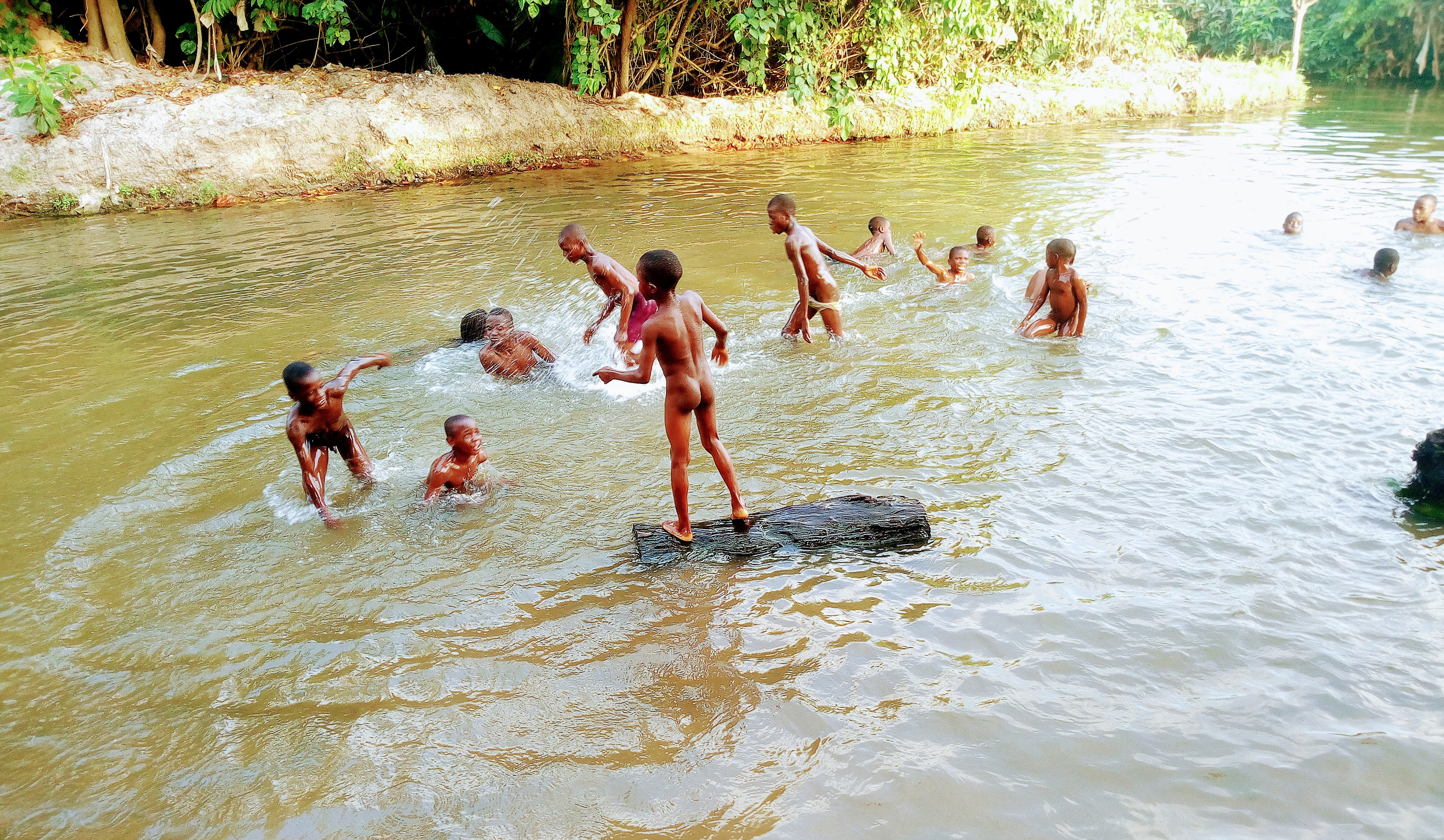
Boys swimming in the creeks of Ikorodu, Lagos, Nigeria (2019)

== Artistic depictions ==
Modern representations
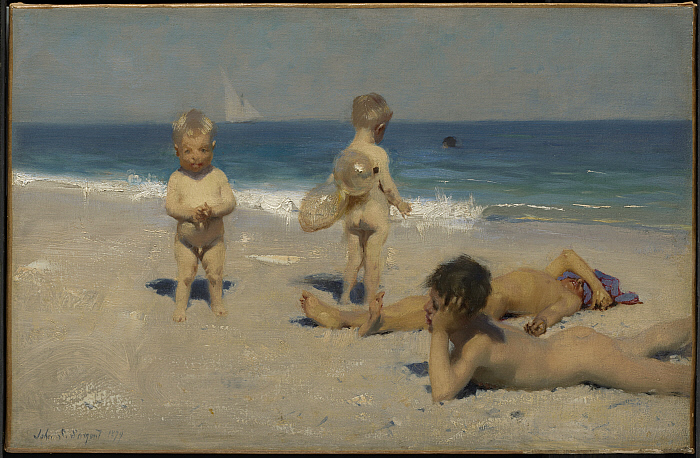
Neapolitan Children Bathing (1879) by John Singer Sargent

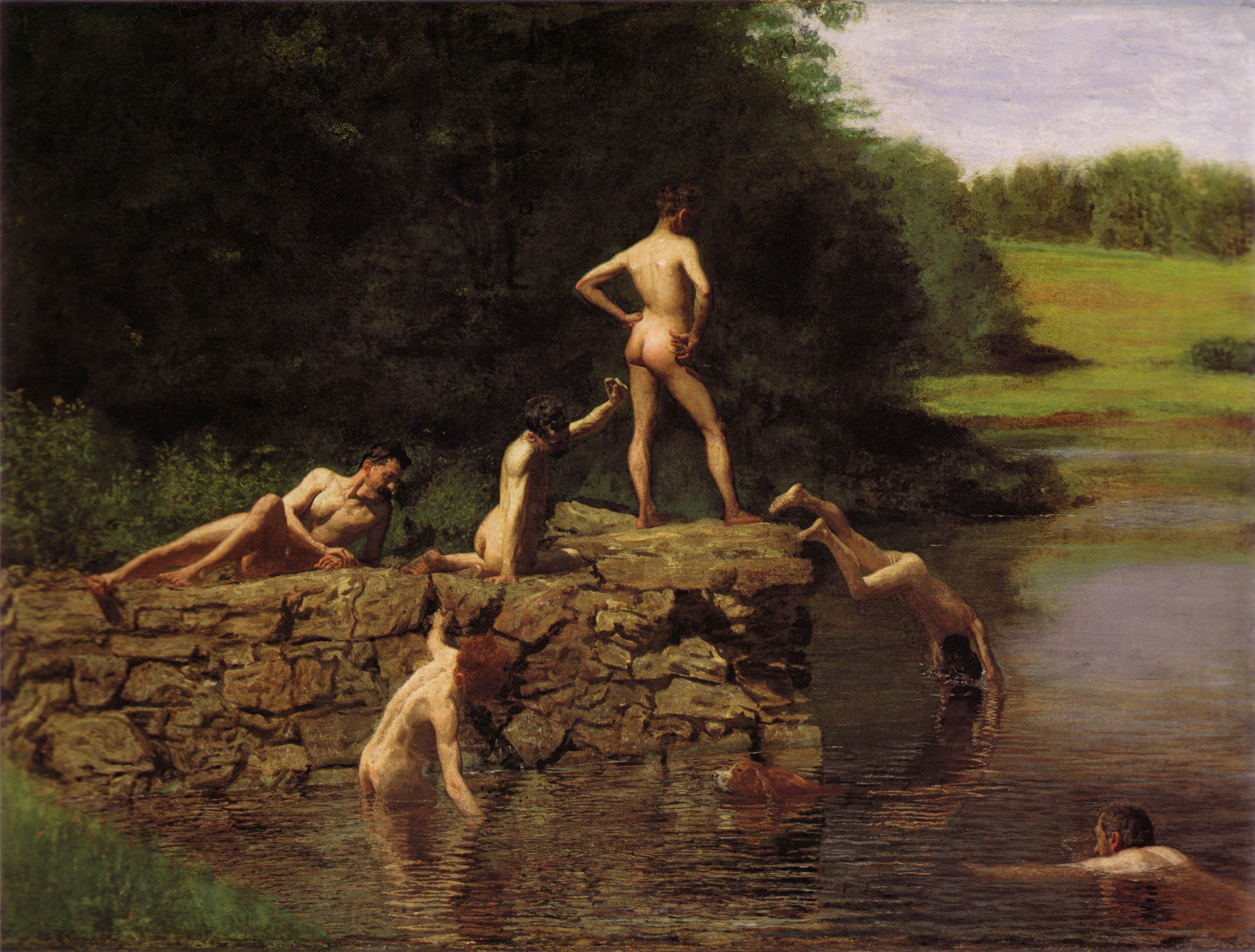
The Swimming Hole by Thomas Eakins (1885)

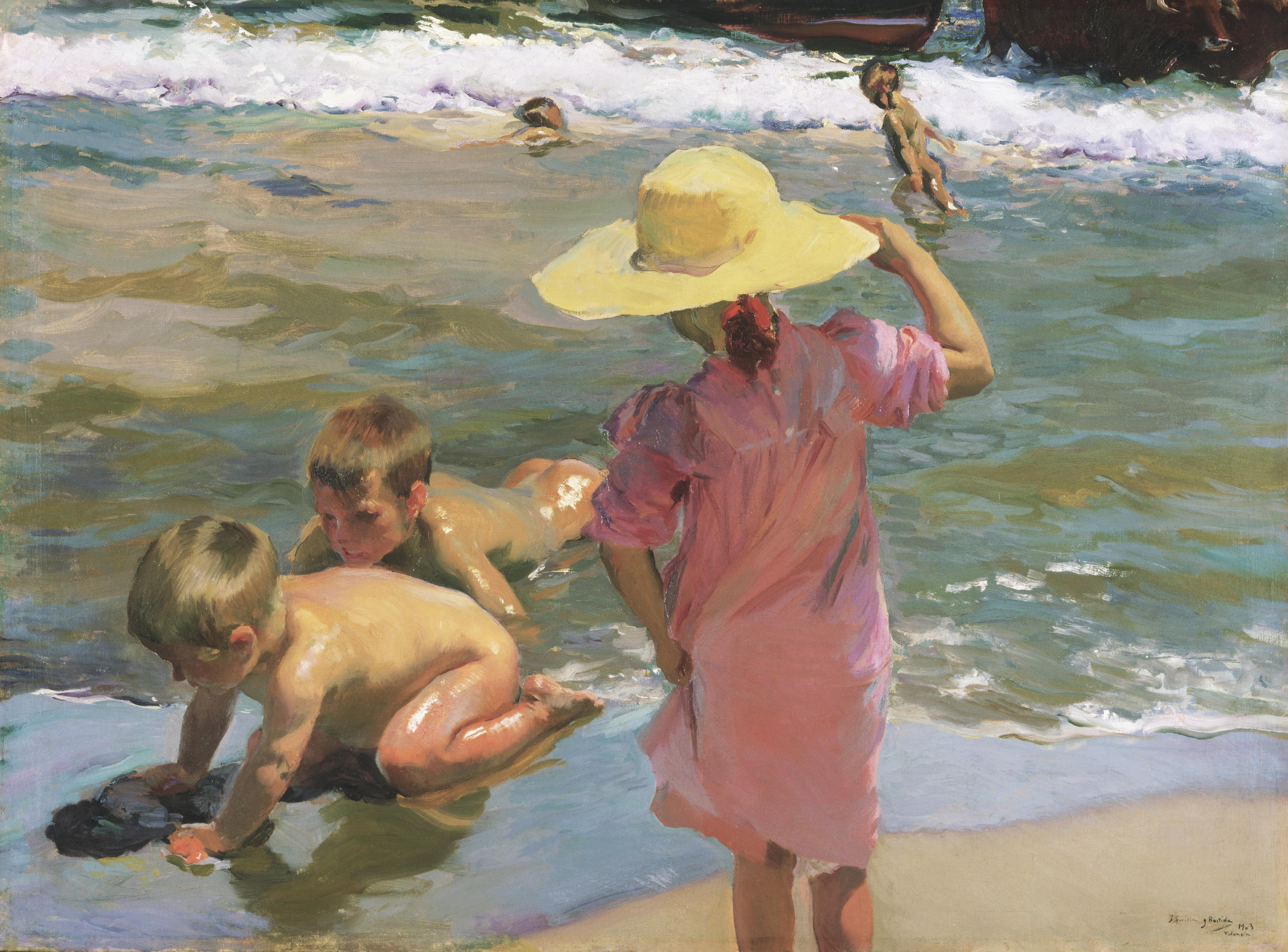
Children at the Seashore (1903) by Joaquín Sorolla

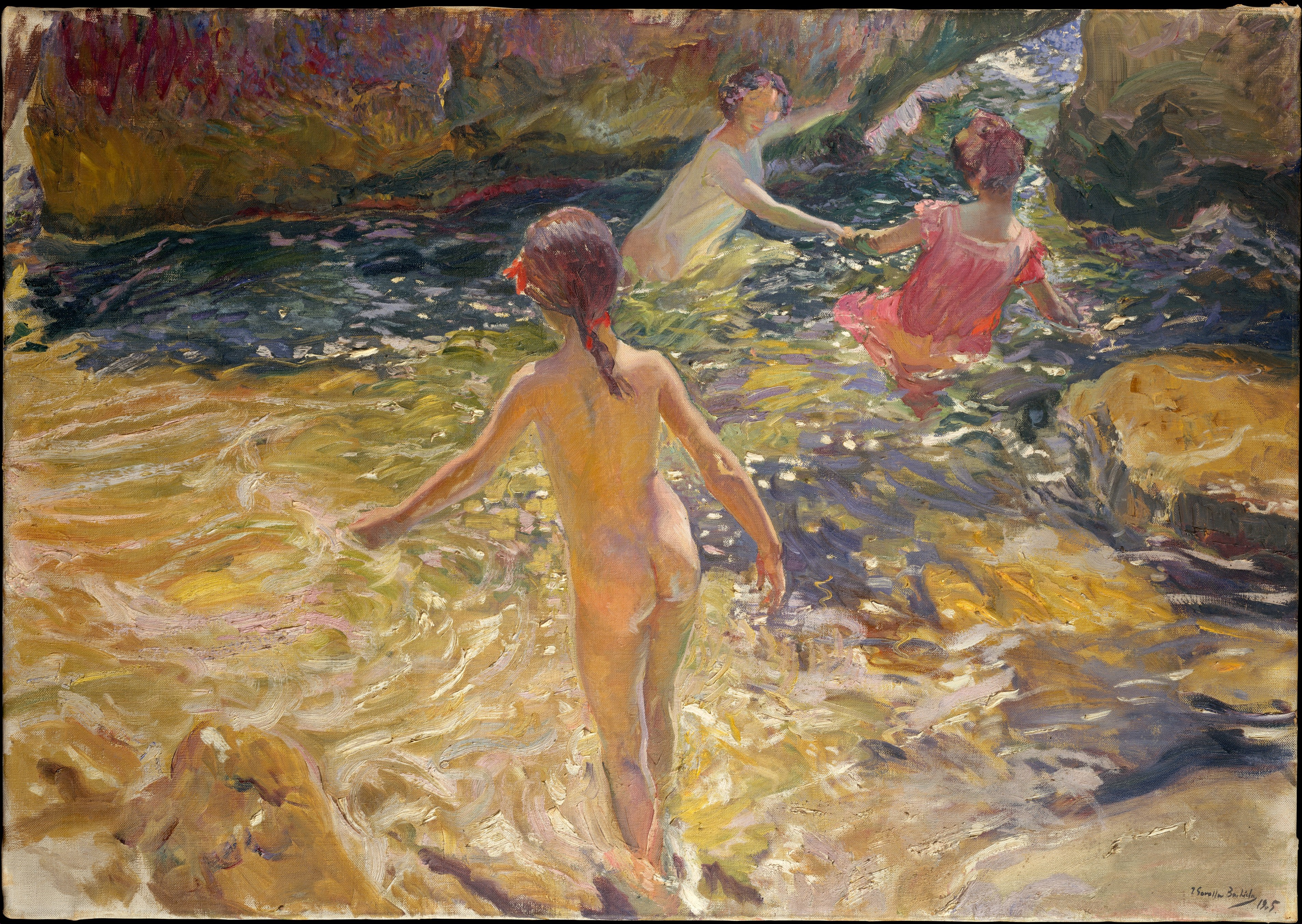
The Bath, Jávea (1905) by Joaquín Sorolla depicts the arist's wife and daughters.

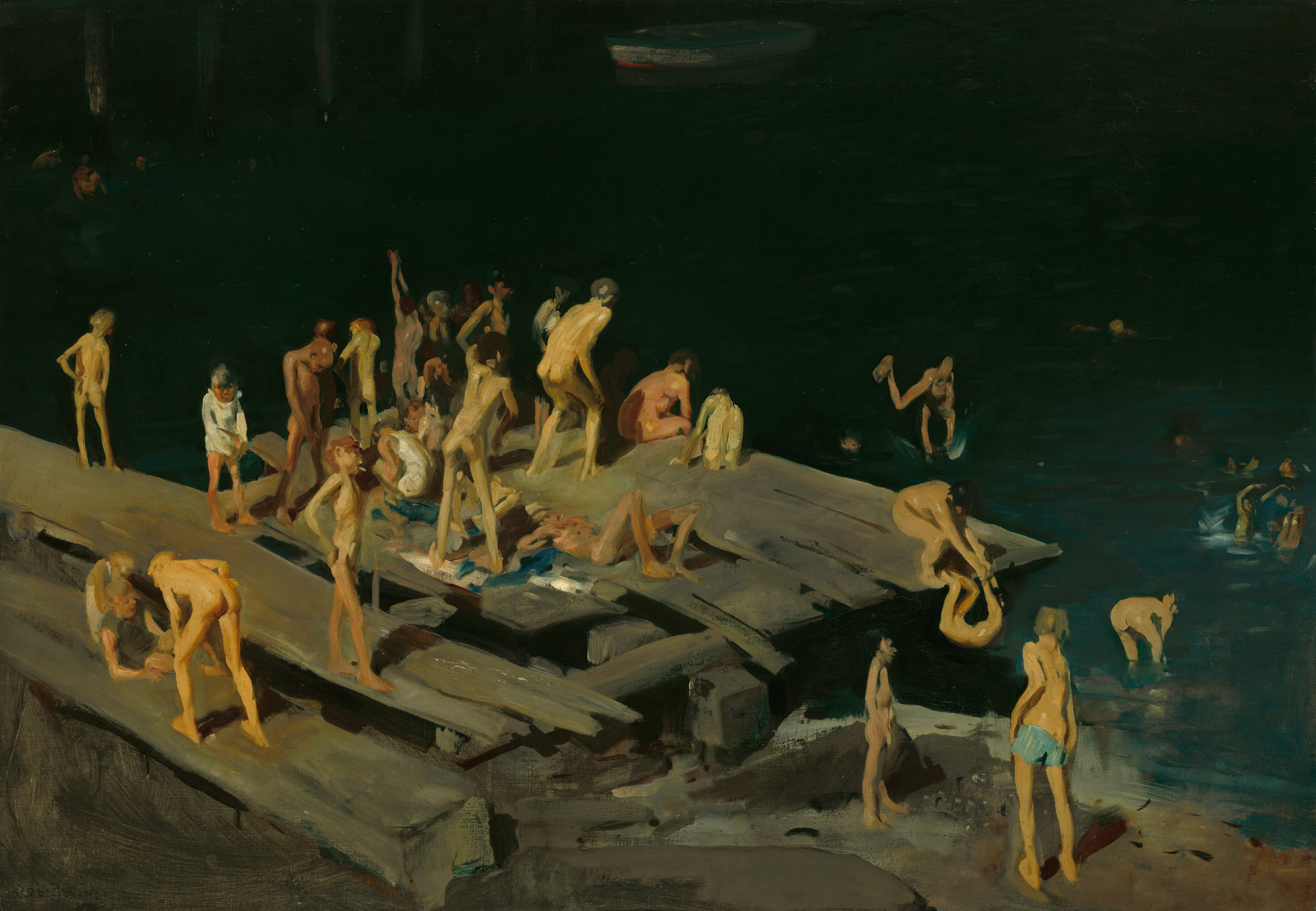
Forty-Two Kids by George Bellows (1907)

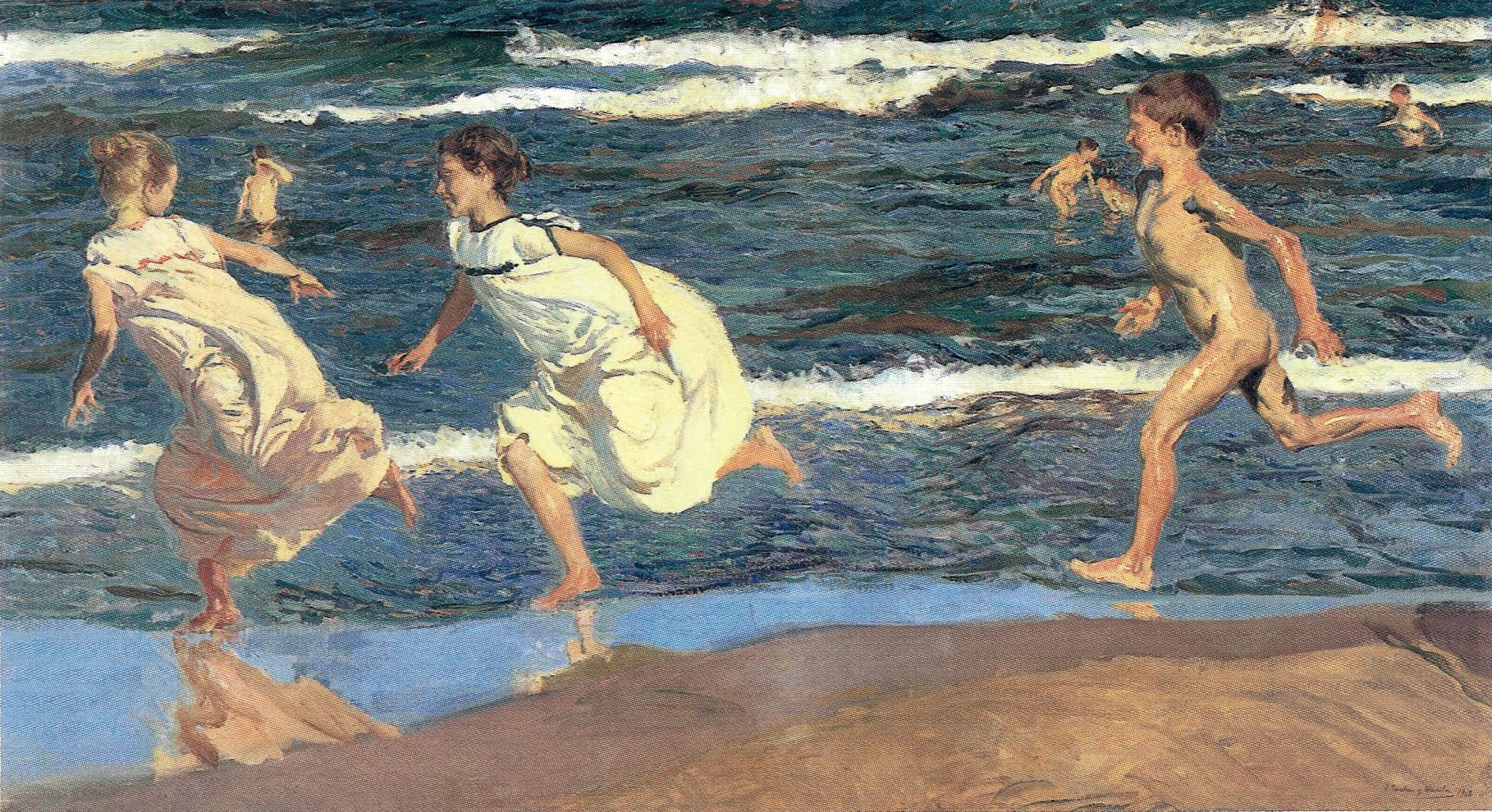
Running along the Beach, Valencia (1908) by Joaquín Sorolla

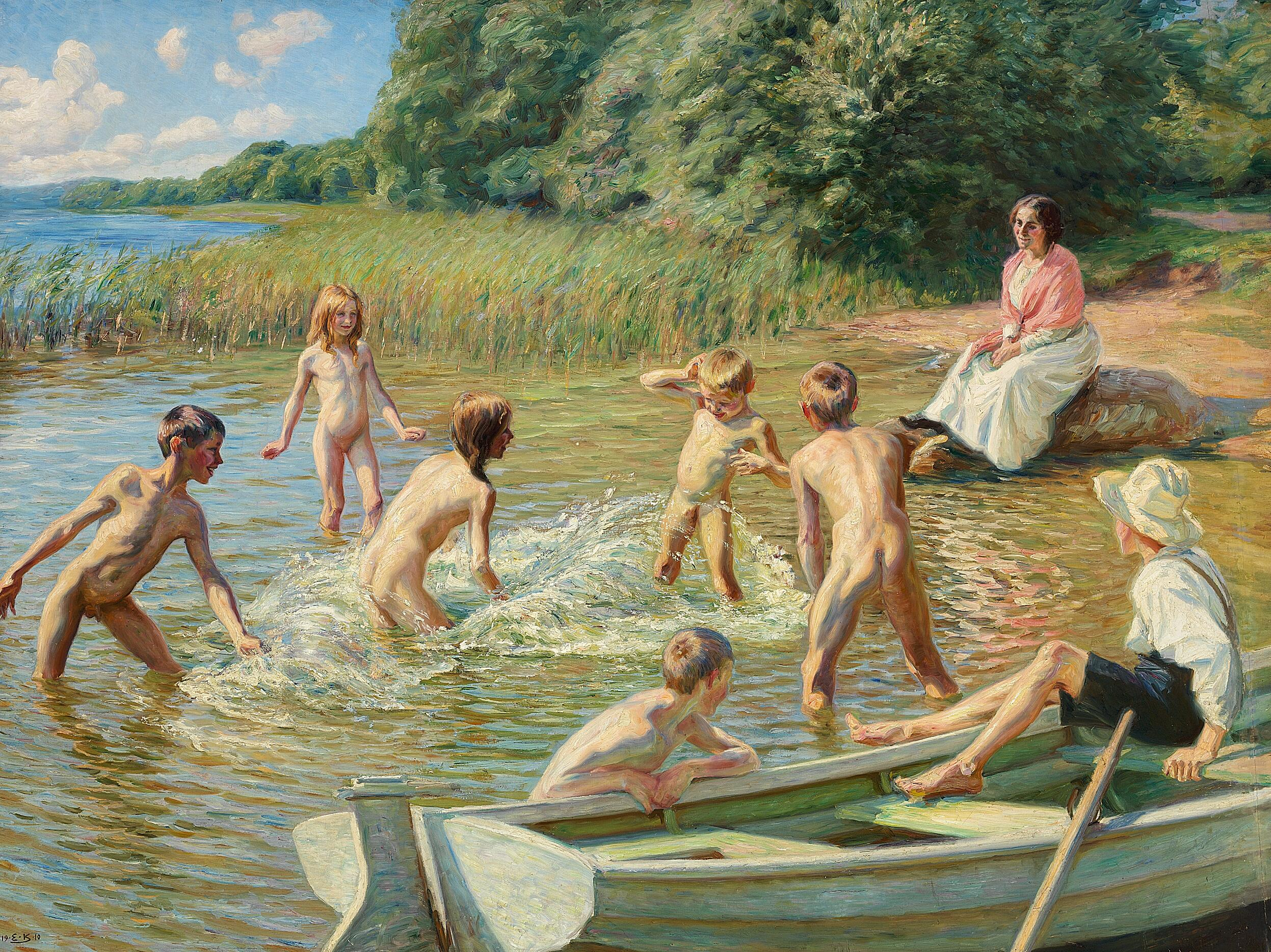
Children bathing near a rowboat (1910) by Danish painter Emil Axel Krause (1871–1945)

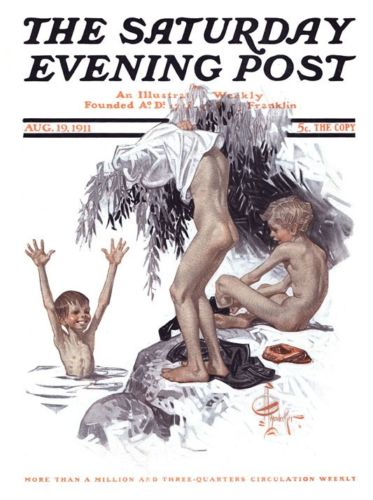
Saturday Evening Post cover by J. C. Leyendecker (August 19, 1911)

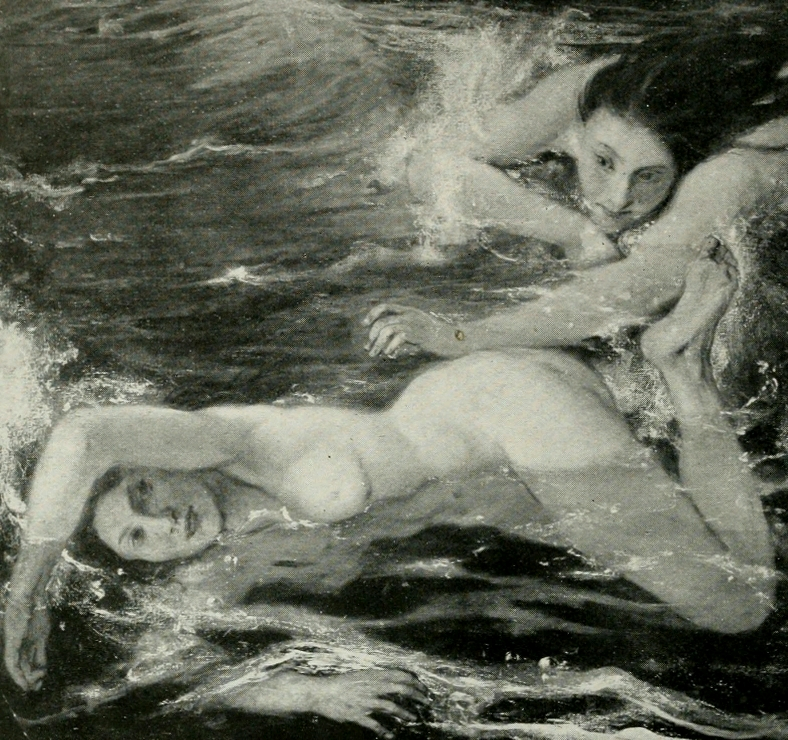
The Pursuit – Nudes Swimming by Charles Shannon (1922)

Late in the 19th century, painters started to render nude boys and men in realistic settings. Daumier's Bathers shows youths clumsily hauling off their clothes (a symbol of repression) and a naked short stocky youth stepping cautiously into the water that represents freedom. Seurat's Bathers Asnières uses similar symbolism to show the bathers removing their everyday identities to step into the momentary sunlight.

The bathers in Thomas Eakins' The Swimming Hole each represent different stages in the artist's life. He prepared for this canvas by taking multiple photographs of his students frolicking at this location. The painting portrays a happy physical un-selfconsciousness seen through the perspective of age; a nostalgia for youth. By the 1880s, this nostalgia for youth was a veneer carefully disguising a latent homosexuality. In contrast, there were poets and painters who would contrast the free young beauty of bodies in the water with the approaching grind of maturity and responsibility. Henry Scott Tuke painted naked bathers in a soft, idealized style, deliberately avoiding overt sexuality.

Cezanne's monumental male bathers derive from memories of a happy childhood rather than direct observation. This was described by his friend Emile Zola as a time when "they were possessed with the joys of plunging (naked) into the deeper pools where the waters flowed, or spending the days stark naked in the sun, drying themselves on the burning sand, diving in once more to live in the river..."

In later periods, depictions of nude swimming scenes became rarer, but more likely to depict straightforward contemporary scenes. The cover of the August 19, 1911, edition of the Saturday Evening Post had a Leyendecker painting of three boys; the cover of the June 4, 1921, edition had Norman Rockwell's painting No Swimming, depicting boys in various states of undress escaping from the local authorities.

== In film ==
A number of films have included nude swimming scenes, which have received varying reactions from reviewers and the public.

=== 20th century ===
- 1918 – Tad's Swimming Hole was a silent comedy film by King Vidor; it had frontal shots of nude boys that were censored in some places, including Chicago.
- 1933 – Ecstasy, a Czech film directed by Gustav Machatý, was banned in many places and censored in others. The film included a nude swimming scene with Hedy Lamarr in her film debut.

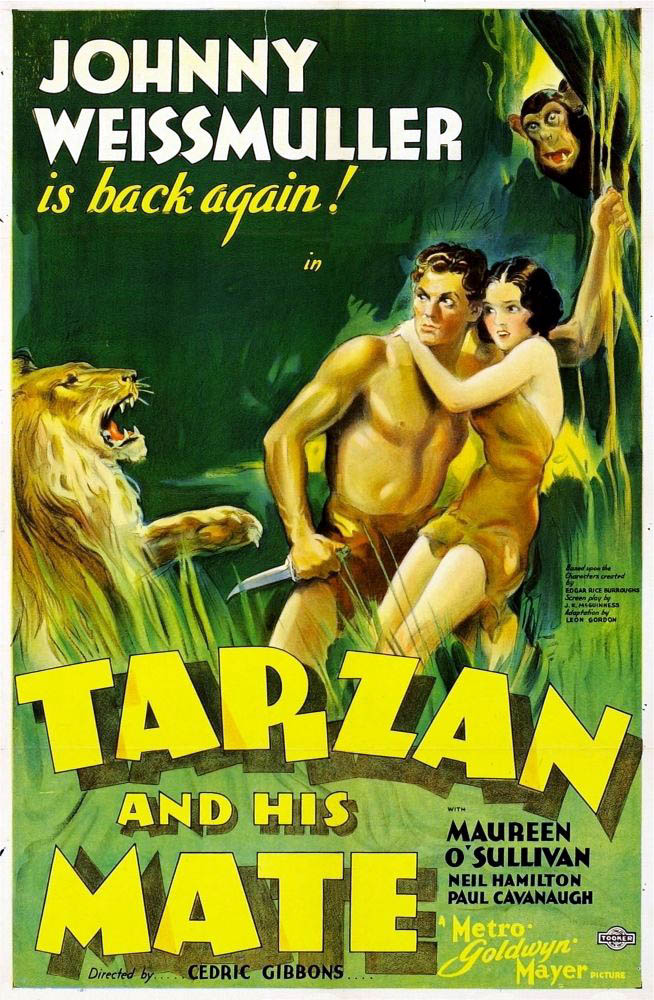
Poster for "Tarzan and His Mate"

- 1934 – Tarzan and His Mate featured the female lead (played by a double) swimming nude. However, religious groups lobbied to have the scene removed. Three versions of this movie now exist.
- 1943 – Child Bride featured the female lead, 12-year-old Shirley Mills, swimming nude. It is considered the most notable scene of the film.
- 1954 – Garden of Eden is a nudist film directed by Max Nosseck. In Excelsior Pictures v. New York Board of Regents the New York State Court of Appeals ruled that onscreen nudity was not obscene, allowing more open depictions of nudity in film.
- 1960 – The Nudist Story is a British film directed by Ramsey Herrington set in the Avonmore Sun Camp, with people of all ages swimming in the camp pool.
- 1960 – Pollyanna starts with a close-up of the nude buttocks of a 6-year-old blond boy, played by William Betz, on a rope swing dropping into White Sulfur Springs, Santa Rosa, California; his mother was an extra on the film. The scene includes several other boys swimming nude in the river.
- 1964 - The Girl and the Echo, a Soviet film in which a young girl on vacation named Vika is seen skinny dipping in a couple of scenes.
- 1968 – Robby, an American film directed by Ralph C. Bluemke and inspired by the Robinson Crusoe story. It features the male leads, 8-year-old Robby (Warren Raum) and 10-year-old Friday (Ryp Siani), walking, playing and sea bathing in the nude together. Several lengthy scenes depict full frontal nudity and rear nudity of both boys. The film failed to attain a wide distribution deal, as prospective distributors were wary about the extensive nudity featured in the film. The film was shot on location on Vieques Island in Puerto Rico, the same island on which Lord of the Flies was shot five years earlier.
- 1969 – Age of Consent, a UK/Australian film by director Michael Powell which includes an extended scene showing a 24-year-old Helen Mirren playing a teenage girl and swimming nude underwater in an Australian reef.
- 1971 – Christa is a Danish film directed by Jack O'Connell (renamed Swedish Fly Girls in English) about flight attendants sharing an apartment in Copenhagen. The film features much domestic nudity as well as visits to a nude beach where there are families with children.
- 1971 – Walkabout, an Australian/British film directed by Nicolas Roeg, shows actress Jenny Agutter and actors David Gulpilil and Luc Roeg swimming nude. The nude swimming scenes are set in several water holes in the Australian outback during an extended time disconnected from civilization.
- 1972 – The Genesis Children, an art film directed by Anthony Aikman. Although it was called "very benign" by the US rating administration, it received an X rating. It has remained controversial ever since because of several lengthy scenes featuring full frontal nudity and rear nudity which show a large group of teenage and preteen boys walking, dancing and swimming nude on a beach.
- 1975 – Jaws, an American film directed by Steven Spielberg, features a brief scene showing Chrissie Watkins (Susan Backlinie) swimming nude in the ocean at night before being killed by a great white shark.
- 1979 - 1941, a woman, played again by Susan Backlinie, goes for a skinny dip in the ocean. She doesn't get eaten or otherwise die, but instead finds herself naked on top of a Japanese submarine.
- 1980 – The Blue Lagoon, an American film directed by Randal Kleiser based on a novel, features teenaged nudity. In the film, two cousins are shipwrecked on a tropical island. They survive, reach puberty, fall in love, and have a child together. The female lead was played by Brooke Shields (aged 14 at the time), and the male lead was played by 18-year-old Christopher Atkins. All of the nude scenes involving Shields's character were performed by the film's 32-year-old stunt coordinator, Kathy Troutt. Shields performed many of her own topless scenes with her hair glued to her breasts. Atkins performed his own nude scenes, which included brief frontal nudity.
- 1981 - On Golden Pond, Katherine Hepburn and Jane Fonda, playing a mother and her adult daughter, go skinny dipping together late at night in a lake by the family cabin.
- 1981 - Heavy Metal, the heroic Taarna is seen swimming naked towards a giant statue. Once she arrives there she dons her warrior attire and flies off on a dangerous mission.
- 1984 - Ronia, the Robber's Daughter, the main character Ronia is seen swimming naked by herself. Later on she is seen swimming and sunbathing with her friend Mattis.
- 1986 - Children of a Lesser God, Sarah Norman (Marlee Matlin) goes skinny-dipping in a school pool for a couple of different scenes. She's a janitor at the same school for the Deaf she went to as a student, and thus has access to the pool when it would otherwise be closed.
- 1991 – The Man in the Moon, an American film in which Reese Witherspoon plays a 14-year-old tomboy who goes skinny dipping in a nearby creek and finds that the long-vacant property is occupied. Witherspoon's character, "Dani", is briefly shown nude from behind running into and then out of the water; this scene was not performed by Witherspoon, but by a double.
- 1995 - Now and Then, A group of boys are caught skinny-dipping by the female leads, who then proceed to steal their clothes.
- 1997 - Hermes – Love Blows Like the Wind, This is an anime film created by the controversial religious group Happy Science. Aphrodite (depicted as a princess rather than a goddess) is first seen swimming naked in the ocean. After drying off on land one of her handmaidens dresses her up.
- 1998 - Mulan, The main character swims and bathes at one point, and her male comrades join in. She does her best to hide the fact that she's a woman and leaves.

=== 21st century ===
- 2003 - I Am David, shortly after escaping a forced labor camp in communist-era Bulgaria, the main character enjoys a bath and skinny dip in a pond outdoors. While swimming he sees a plane fly above as well, just as free as he is now.
- 2007 - Wild Hogs, the main characters go skinny dipping together, and much to their surprise a family on a road trip stops by to have a picnic where they're at.
- 2010 – Piranha 3D, a 3D comedy horror film which features nude underwater swimming by Danni (Kelly Brook) and Crystal (Riley Steele).
- 2012 - The Artist and the Model, Aida Folch plays a young woman named Mercè who works as a life model, and thus spends much of the film in the nude. She skinny dips in a couple of scenes, including one scene in which she grabs a fish with her bare hands.
- 2025 – Chainsaw Man – The Movie: Reze Arc, a Japanese anime film shown Denji and Reze skinny dip in the outdoor pool and she teaches him to swim.

== See also ==
- Naturism
- Nude beach
- "Nightswimming" – song by R.E.M. that refers to skinny dipping.
- Nude recreation
- Public bathing
