= Shirley Mills =

American actress and dancer (1926–2010)

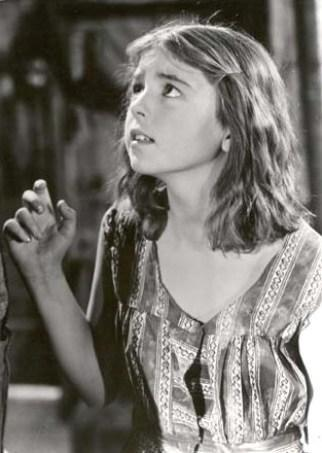
- Shirley Mills in Child Bride
- Born: April 8, 1926; Tacoma, Washington, US
- Died: March 31, 2010 (aged 83); Arcadia, California, US
- Other name: Shirley O'Mills
- Years active: 1938–1956
- Spouse: Mel Hanson (m. 1977; died 1994)

Shirley Olivia Mills (April 8, 1926 – March 31, 2010) was an American actress. She played the roles of the youngest daughter in The Grapes of Wrath and the title character in Child Bride. In the latter, she is shown nude in a nude swimming scene, filmed when she was about 12 years old, which became the basis for Child Bride being classified for many years as an exploitation film.

== Biography ==
Born on April 8, 1926, in Tacoma, Washington, Mills started her career as a child dancer, and later appeared in films such as Child Bride (1938 (Note: Sources conflict on this year. AllMovie lists 1938, and another source lists 1941, while the American Film Institute catalogs it at 1943.)) at the age of 12, The Grapes of Wrath (1940), and the Shirley Temple film Young People (1940).

She stopped making films in her early twenties but was later a pioneer in selling data-processing services in the 1960s, becoming the first female president of the Data Processing Management Association in Los Angeles and later vice president of marketing and public relations for Management Applied Programming, a major data processing center, for which she started a division for nonprofit organizations. Hanson also launched her own wedding planning company, A Party for All Seasons.

Mills married Mel Hanson, a minister, in 1977 who died 18 years later; they had no children.

Mills died from complications of pneumonia in Arcadia, California, on March 31, 2010.

== Filmography ==
Film
Year	Title	Role	Notes
1938	Child Bride	Jennie Colton	Alternative titles: Child Bride of the Ozarks; Child Brides; Dust to Dust
1939	The Under-Pup	Cecilia Layton	
1940	The Grapes of Wrath	Ruth "Ruthie" Joad	
1940	Virginia City	Crying young Southern girl	Uncredited
1940	Young People	Mary Ann	
1940	Five Little Peppers in Trouble	June	
1940	Diamond Frontier	Girl in Bonnet playing in Street	Uncredited
1942	Miss Annie Rooney	Audrey Hollis	
1943	Shadow of a Doubt	Shirley	Alternative title: Shadow of Doubt
1943	Reveille with Beverly	Laura Jean Oliver	Uncredited
1943	Henry Aldrich Gets Glamour	Hortense	Uncredited; Alternative title: Henry Gets Glamour
1943	Mister Big	Member, Jivin' Jacks and Jills	Uncredited
1943	Top Man	Dancer	Uncredited; Alternative title: Man of the Family
1943	Always a Bride's Maid	Member of The Jivin' Jacks and Jills	Uncredited
1943	True to Life	Radio Sister	Uncredited
1944	Chip Off the Old Block	Member, Jivin' Jacks and Jills	Uncredited
1944	None Shall Escape	Anna Oremska	
1944	Nine Girls	"Tennessee" Collingwood	
1945	Patrick the Great	Member, Jivin' Jacks and Jills	Uncredited
1945	Snafu	Student	Uncredited; Alternative title: Welcome Home
1946	Blondie's Lucky Day	Grace Perkins	(scenes deleted)
1946	Betty Co-Ed	Gloria Campbell	Alternative title: The Melting Pot
1946	That Brennan Girl	Olivette the Babysitter	Uncredited; Alternative title: Tough Girl
1949	An Old-Fashioned Girl	Belle	
1950	It's a Small World	Susan Musk at Age 16	Credited as Shirley O. Mills
1950	What Happened to Jo Jo	Jennifer Van Zandt	Short; Credited as Shirley O. Mills
1951	Fighting Coast Guard	Verna	Uncredited
1951	The Family Secret	File Girl	Uncredited
1951	The Model and the Marriage Broker	Ina Kuschner	Uncredited
1952	My Six Convicts	Blonde Tilly	Uncredited; Alternative title: My 6 Convicts
Television
Year	Title	Role	Notes
1954	My Little Margie	Muriel Joyner	1 episode Credited as Shirley O'Mills
1956	Ford Star Jubilee		1 episode
