= Tommy Rall =

American actor and dancer (1929–2020)

- Born: Thomas Edward Rall; December 27, 1929; Kansas City, Missouri, U.S.
- Died: October 6, 2020 (aged 90); Santa Monica, California, U.S.
- Occupations: Actor, dancer, singer
- Years active: 1942–1988
- Spouse(s): Monte Amundsen (1959–19??; divorced); Karel J. Shimoff (1967–2020)

Thomas Edward Rall (December 27, 1929 – October 6, 2020) was an American actor, ballet dancer, tap dancer, and acrobatic dancer who was a prominent featured player in 1950s musical comedies. He later became a successful operatic tenor in the 1960s, making appearances with the Opera Company of Boston, the New York City Opera, and the American National Opera Company.

== Life and career ==
Rall was born in Kansas City, Missouri to Edward and Margaret Rall, but raised in Seattle, Washington. An only child, he had a crossed eye which made it hard for him to read books, so his mother enrolled him in dancing classes. In his early years he performed a dance and acrobatic vaudeville act in Seattle theaters and attempted small acting roles.

His family moved to Los Angeles in the 1940s, and Rall began to appear in small movie roles. His first film appearance was a short MGM film called Vendetta. He began taking tap dancing lessons and became a member of the jitterbugging Jivin' Jacks and Jills at Universal Studios.

Rall joined Donald O'Connor, Peggy Ryan, and Shirley Mills in several light wartime Andrews Sisters vehicles including Give Out, Sisters (1942), Get Hep to Love (1942), and Mister Big (1943), among others. He appeared in the films The North Star and Song of Russia (1944).

Rall took ballet lessons and danced in classical and Broadway shows, including Milk and Honey, Call Me Madam, and Cry for Us All. Jerry Herman said of Rall in Milk and Honey: "[Donald] [Saddler] did extraordinary choreography for Tommy Rall, who was suddenly so admired by the audience that [the producer] put his name on the marquee under the three stars. It was very, very earned by him. He was a terrific singer and dancer."

He is best known for his acrobatic dancing in several classic musical films of the 1950s, including Kiss Me, Kate as "Bill" (1953), Seven Brides for Seven Brothers as "Frank" (1954), Invitation to the Dance (1956), Merry Andrew as "Giacomo Gallini" (1958), and My Sister Eileen as "Chick" (1955).

Rall's film career waned as movie musicals went into decline. He had a role in the movie Funny Girl, as "The Prince" in a parody of the ballet Swan Lake. On Broadway he danced to acclaim as "Johnny" in Marc Blitzstein and Joseph Stein's 1959 musical Juno (based on Seán O'Casey's play Juno and the Paycock). Ken Mandelbaum wrote: "DeMille provided two fine ballets: her second act 'Johnny' in which Tommy Rall danced out Johnny's emotions...was the evening's highlight."

He took the title role in a production of Massenet's Le jongleur de Notre-Dame by the New England Opera Theatre in Boston in 1961 in a role which required both singing and juggling and dancing.

Of Rall, contemporary dancer and choreographer Gene Kelly said: "The best all-around dancer we had over at MGM was Tommy Rall. He could do anything and do it better than any other dancer."

=== Personal life ===
Rall was briefly married to his Juno co-star Monte Amundsen. He later married former ballerina Karel Shimoff.

In 2007, a Texas dance instructor by the name of Fredric Brame was found to have been posing as Tommy Rall since the late 1960s. When Rall found out about the masquerade decades later, through a friend of the family, Rall contacted the Montgomery County, Texas Sheriff's office. No legal action was taken against Brame. Rall wanted Brame to stop taking credit for his work and warned that if he continued or did it again a lawsuit would be filed.

=== Death ===
In September 2020, Rall had heart surgery and recovered at the Fireside Health Center (Santa Monica, California). Subsequently, in October, he had additional heart surgery at Providence Saint John's Health Center (Santa Monica, California). He died of congestive heart failure on October 6, aged 90. He was survived by his wife, Karel, and their son, Aaron, a lieutenant colonel in the United States Army. Another son, David, predeceased his parents.

== Filmography ==
Sources: TCM; MasterWorks Broadway

Features:

- What's Cookin'? (1942) as Member, The Jivin' Jacks and Jills (uncredited)
- Private Buckaroo (1942) as Member of the Jivin' Jacks and Jills (uncredited)
- Give Out, Sisters (1942) as Member of the Jivin' Jacks and Jills
- Get Hep to Love (1942) as Member - Jivin' Jacks (uncredited)
- It Comes Up Love (1943) as Stag (uncredited)
- Mister Big (1943) as 'Jivin' Jacks and Jills' Member (uncredited)
- Always a Bridesmaid (1943) as Member of The Jivin' Jacks and Jills (uncredited)
- The North Star (1943) as Dancing Peasant (uncredited)
- Song of Russia (1944) as Dancing Peasant (uncredited)
- Ziegfeld Follies (1945) as Chorus Boy (uncredited)
- Kiss Me Kate (1953) as Bill Calhoun 'Lucentio'
- Seven Brides for Seven Brothers (1954) as Frank (Frankincense) Pontipee
- My Sister Eileen (1955) as Chick
- The Second Greatest Sex (1955) as Alf Connors
- World in My Corner (1956) as Ray Kacsmerek
- Invitation to the Dance (1956) as The Sharpie in 'Ring Around the Rosy'
- Walk the Proud Land (1956) as Taglito
- Merry Andrew (1958) as Giacomo Gallini
- Funny Girl (1968) as Prince in 'Swan Lake' Parody (uncredited)
- Pennies from Heaven (1981) as Ed
- Dancers (1987) as Patrick
- Saturday the 14th Strikes Back (1988) as The Werewolf (final film role)
- Broadway: Beyond the Golden Age (2018, Documentary) as Himself

Short Subjects:

- Vendetta (1942) Bit Part (uncredited)
- Trumpet Serenade (1942) as Himself - Member, 'The Jivin' Jacks and Jills'

== Stage work, Broadway ==
Source: MasterWorksBroadway; Internet Broadway Database

- American Concertette (1945)
- Ballet Theatre (1946)
- Look Ma, I'm Dancin'! (as Tommy) (1948)
- Small Wonder (1948)
- Miss Liberty (as The Boy, The Dandy, Another Lamplighter) (1949)
- Call Me Madam (Principal Dancer) (1950) (also understudy for Russell Nype)
- Juno (as Johnny Boyle) (1959)
- Milk and Honey (as David) (1961)
- Cafe Crown (as David Cole) (1964)
- Cry for Us All (as Petey Boyle) (1970)

== Sources ==
- Koegler, Horst (1998). "Rall, Tommy", Dizionario della danza e del balletto, p. 392. Gremese Editore. ISBN 88-7742-262-9. (in Italian)
- Mordden, Ethan (2002). Open a new window: the Broadway musical in the 1960s. Palgrave Macmillan, p. 102. ISBN 1-4039-6013-5
