= Arthur Rubin (theater producer) =

American actor, theater manager and producer (1926–2023)

- Born: June 16, 1926
- Died: July 22, 2023 (aged 97); Great Neck, New York, U.S.
- Occupations: Actor, Producer, Theater Manager

Arthur Rubin (June 16, 1926 – July 23, 2023) was an American actor, stage manager, and Tony Award-winning theatrical producer.

== Performer and stage manager ==
Rubin began his professional career in the Radio City Music Hall glee club in 1950. The following year he made his Broadway debut in the revue Two on the Aisle—starring Bert Lahr and Dolores Gray—the first of numerous Broadway productions, including Can-Can, Silk Stockings, and The Most Happy Fella.

To supplement his income as an actor, Rubin also worked as a stage manager and assistant stage manager on Broadway productions of Silk Stockings, The Most Happy Fella, The Music Man, Greenwillow, West Side Story, and Wildcat.

Even after transitioning to producing, Rubin continued to perform periodically. From 1960 to 1980 Rubin appeared in the annual Milliken Breakfast Show, an industrial musical presented by Milliken & Company. He lent his talents to two Mel Brooks films, appearing in The Producers as a would-be Hitler and dubbing Cary Elwes's singing in the title role of Robin Hood: Men in Tights.

While Rubin was already vice president and general manager of the Nederlander Organization, he appeared in the 1985 Lincoln Center concert revival of Follies as Roscoe, and in 1991 he returned the role of Giuseppe in a revival of The Most Happy Fella at New York City Opera.

== Theater manager and Broadway producer ==
Following the closing of Here's Love in 1964 (a musical adaptation of Miracle on 34th Street), Rubin decided to focus on offstage roles: "I thought … I'm never going to make it as a lead and make the big money. But I think I can make it on the business side because I've always had a business sense." That same year he worked on the general manager of the Broadway Theatre during the run of Folies Bergère. Subsequently he worked as the general manager for the Lunt-Fontanne, Mark Hellinger, and Biltmore theaters.

Rubin turned his hand to producing with the 1981 revival of Can-Can. Over the next dozen years he was producer or associate producer for another 13 theatrical events on Broadway, including the infamous Legs Diamond, concerts by Shirley Bassey and Smokey Robinson, and revivals of Cafe Crown, Peter Pan, and Sweet Charity, winning a Tony Award for the latter.

== Nederlander Organization ==
Rubin joined the Nederlander Organization in 1975, first as general manager and eventually assuming the role of vice president. Over this period Nederlander theaters hosted a wide variety of theatrical fare, notably Black and Blue, Fences, Lost in Yonkers, The Will Rogers Follies, as well as circus, dance, pop music, and revivals of Shakespeare, Eugene O'Neill, Tennessee Williams.

During his tenure the organization expanded its portfolio to include the Marquis Theatre, and conversely saw the lease and eventual sale of the Mark Hellinger Theatre to the Times Square Church.

In 1992 the Nederlander Organization complained to the Manhattan District Attorney's office of $300,000 in missing box office receipts from its Lunt-Fontanne Theater, where the comedy Catskills on Broadway was running. As supervisor of the Nederlander's box office operations, Rubin initially survived the subsequent corporate reorganization, but shortly after resigned "to pursue other personal business interests."

== Personal life and death ==
Rubin had two children. He died on July 22, 2023 at the age of 97 in Great Neck, New York.

== Stage credits ==
=== As actor and stage manager ===
Theatre credits
| Year | Title | Role(s) | Venue | Refs. |
|---|---|---|---|---|
| 1951 | Two on the Aisle | Conductor | Mark Hellinger Theatre, Broadway | |
| 1953 | Can-Can | Policeman, Second | Shubert Theatre, Broadway | |
| 1955 | Silk Stockings | Reporter; assistant stage manager | Imperial Theatre, Broadway | |
| 1956 | The Most Happy Fella | Giuseppe; assistant stage manager | Imperial Theatre, Broadway | |
| 1957 | The Most Happy Fella | Giuseppe; assistant stage manager | Broadway Theatre, Broadway | |
| 1957 | The Music Man | assistant stage manager | Majestic Theatre, Broadway | |
| 1958 | The Most Happy Fella | Giuseppe (replacement) | US national tour | |
| 1959 | Juno | Foley | Winter Garden Theatre, Broadway | |
| 1960 | Greenwillow | stage manager | Alvin Theatre, Broadway | |
| 1960 | West Side Story | understudy: Krupke, Gladhand; assistant stage manager | Winter Garden Theatre, Broadway | |
| 1960 | Wildcat | stage manager | Alvin Theatre, Broadway | |
| 1961 | Kean | Francis | Broadway Theatre, Broadway | |
| 1963 | Here's Love | Tammany O'Halloran; stage manager | Shubert Theatre, Broadway | |
| 1985 | Follies in Concert | Roscoe | Avery Fisher Hall | |
| 1991 | The Most Happy Fella | Giuseppe | New York State Theater | |

=== As producer ===
Theatre credits
| Year | Title | Venue | Refs. |
|---|---|---|---|
| 1981 | Can-Can | Minskoff Theatre, Broadway | |
| 1983 | La Tragédie de Carmen | Vivian Beaumont Theatre, Broadway | |
| 1984 | Doug Henning & His World of Magic | Lunt-Fontanne Theatre, Broadway | |
| 1986 | Sweet Charity | Minskoff Theatre, Broadway | |
| 1986 | Shirley Bassey | Marquis Theatre, Broadway | |
| 1986 | Smokey Robinson Plus Jean Carne | Mark Hellinger Theatre, Broadway | |
| 1987 | Sweet Charity | North American tour | |
| 1987 | Mort Sahl on Broadway! | Neil Simon Theatre, Broadway | |
| 1988 | Kenny Loggins on Broadway | Neil Simon Theatre, Broadway | |
| 1988 | Legs Diamond | Mark Hellinger Theatre, Broadway | |
| 1989 | Cafe Crown | Brooks Atkinson Theatre, Broadway | |
| 1989 | Barry Manilow at the Gershwin | Gershwin Theatre, Broadway | |
| 1989 | Freddie Jackson: Up Close & Personal | Lunt-Fontanne Theatre, Broadway | |
| 1989 | Dangerous Games | Nederlander Theatre, Broadway | |
| 1990 | Peter Pan | Lunt-Fontanne Theatre, Broadway | |
| 1990 | Ain't Broadway Grand? | Lunt-Fontanne Theatre, Broadway | |

== Filmography ==
=== Film ===
| Year | Title | Role | Notes |
|---|---|---|---|
| 1967 | The Producers | Auditioning Hitler | |
| 1988 | Crossing Delancey | Happy Birthday Singer | |
| 1993 | Robin Hood: Men in Tights | Robin Hood (singing voice) | |

=== Television ===
| Year | Title | Role | Notes |
|---|---|---|---|
| 1963 | Car 54, Where Are You? | Night Court Prisoner | Episode: "See You At The Bar Mitzvah" |
| 1964 | The Patty Duke Show | Pat | Episode: "The Drop Out" |
| 1965 | The Patty Duke Show | Mr. Brown | Episode: "Will The Real Sammy Davis Please Stand Up?" |
| 1986 | Great Performances | Roscoe | Episode: "Follies in Concert" |

== Awards and nominations ==
| Year | Award | Category | Nominated work | Result | Ref. |
|---|---|---|---|---|---|
| 1984 | Drama Desk Award | Unique Theatrical Experience | La Tragédie de Carmen | Won | |
| 1986 | Tony Award | Best Reproduction | Sweet Charity | Won | |
| 1989 | Tony Award | Best Revival | Cafe Crown | Nominated | |
| 1991 | Tony Award | Best Revival | Peter Pan | Nominated | |
