= Get Hep to Love =

1942 film by Charles Lamont

- Film poster
- Directed by: Charles Lamont
- Written by: Jay Dratler; M. M. Musselman
- Produced by: Bernard W. Burton
- Starring: Gloria Jean; Donald O'Connor; Jane Frazee; Robert Paige; Peggy Ryan
- Cinematography: L. William O'Connell
- Distributed by: Universal Pictures
- Release date: October 2, 1942
- Running time: 77 minutes
- Country: United States
- Language: English

Get Hep to Love is a 1942 musical film starring Gloria Jean, Donald O'Connor, Jane Frazee, Robert Paige and Peggy Ryan. The film was directed by Charles Lamont.

== Plot ==
Doris Stanley is an adolescent singer ("14 going on 15") billed as an 11-year-old "child prodigy" by her money-hungry aunt. When Doris finds that her Aunt Addie has reneged on her promise to give her a break from her singing tour, she runs away, and finds herself in a small town. Doris presents herself as a potential adoptee to a young married couple (Ann and Steve Winters). Unbeknownst to Doris, Ann was on the verge of breaking up with Steve due to his preoccupation with golf and refusal to find a real job. Her arrival gives the couple a reason to stay together.

Ann makes both friends and enemies at her new high school, as she vies for the affections of Jimmy, who is stuck on a girl (Elaine) who is toying with him. The school's music teacher, Miss Roberts, takes an interest in Doris when she realizes what a good singing voice she has. A newspaper story appears offering a 5,000 dollar reward for finding the missing Doris. The music teacher makes a trip to the city, ostensibly to claim the reward, but really to find out why Doris ran away. She then claims that the girl she knows is not Doris. The aunt is suspicious and sends a detective to follow her back to the small town.

Meanwhile, Steve is determined to stay with Ann and to keep their adoptive daughter Doris, but he will need some income for the expected court battle. He applies for an insurance job, and successfully talks a stingy client into buying a large policy, thus securing a good commission and a job.

After initially being written out of a music recital, Doris is allowed to perform, wowing the crowd and catching the eye and ear of the detective. The film's climax occurs in the small town courtroom, in which it is revealed that the aunt never properly adopted Doris, and that she is just old enough to freely choose her adoptive parents. She chooses the Winters couple, with the aunt being granted visitation rights. With Jimmy's prospective Prom date down with the mumps (which she caught from another boy), Jimmy sees Doris with new eyes and escorts her to the Prom.

The main cast in this film had also appeared in Gloria Jean's previous film, earlier in 1942, What's Cookin'?. Gloria Jean, Donald O'Connor, and Peggy Ryan would star in two more films together during 1942-1943: It Comes Up Love, and Mister Big.

== Cast ==
- Gloria Jean as Doris Stanley
- Donald O'Connor as Jimmy Arnold
- Jane Frazee as Ann Winters
- Robert Paige as Steve Winters
- Peggy Ryan as Betty Blake
- Edith Barrett as Miss Roberts
- Cora Sue Collins as Elaine Sterling
- Nana Bryant as Aunt Addie
- The Jivin' Jacks and Jills as themselves
- Ray Walker as Gas Station Attendant
- Mary Field as Woman Judge

== Soundtrack ==
Romantic composer Eva Dell'Acqua's song "Villanelle" for coloratura soprano appeared on the soundtrack of the film but was uncredited.
