= Michael G. Fitzgerald =

American historian (1950–2006)

- Born: December 19, 1950; El Dorado, Arkansas, U.S.
- Died: February 14, 2006 (aged 55)
- Occupations: Film historian, author, accountant
- Parent(s): John F. Fitzgerald (father); Tommie Mae Fitzgerald (mother)
- Relatives: Jon David Fitzgerald (nephew); Jerry Wayne Fitzgerald (brother)

Michael G. Fitzgerald (December 19, 1950 – February 14, 2006) was a film historian and author.

Fitzgerald was a native of El Dorado, Arkansas. His best-known work was 1977's Universal Pictures: A Panoramic History in Words, Pictures, and Filmographies (published by Arlington House), which chronicled the history of the studio.

He also co-authored two books with Boyd Magers, Western Women and Ladies of the Western, both from McFarland & Co., which consisted of interviews with many leading ladies of western films. He dedicated this book to his nephew, Jon Fitzgerald, who grew up watching old movies with Michael as a small boy.

Fitzgerald was also noted for co-hosting the annual Jivin' Jacks and Jills Hollywood Reunion in Studio City, California for over 20 years. Named after a dance troupe that performed in Universal films in the 1940s, the event began as a reunion for Universal actors. Fitzgerald was also an active participant in organizing the annual Memphis Film Festival from the early 2000s.

He worked as an accountant in Shreveport, Louisiana, until retiring about 2004. He died at the age of 55 from a staph infection in his foot.

Fitzgerald's family includes his father, John F. Fitzgerald, his mother Tommie Mae Fitzgerald, his brother, Jerry Wayne Fitzgerald; and his nephew, Jon David Fitzgerald. Some time in the late 1960s, Michael's fiancée was killed in an automobile accident, and he never married.

Fitzgerald's favorite movies included musicals with Donald O'Connor, Peggy Ryan, and Gloria Jean, Abbott and Costello films; and classic horror movies such as Frankenstein (1931) and The Wolfman (1941). Fitzgerald spent hours every weekend in his screening room watching these classics on old reel-to-reel films.
