= An Old-Fashioned Girl =

1869 novel by Louisa May Alcott

- Author: Louisa May Alcott
- Language: English
- Genre: Fiction, romance, friendship
- Publisher: Roberts Brothers
- Publication date: 1869
- Publication place: United States
- Media type: Print

An Old-Fashioned Girl is a novel by Louisa May Alcott first published in 1869. The book revolves around Polly Milton, the 'old-fashioned' girl of the title, who visits her friend Fanny Shaw's wealthy family in the city and is overwhelmed by the fashionable life they lead and disturbed to see how the family members fail to understand one another and demonstrate little affection. She is largely content to remain on the fringes of their social life but exerts a powerful influence over their emotional lives and family relations.

The first six chapters of the novel were serialized in the Merry's Museum magazine between July and August 1869. Alcott added another thirteen chapters before publishing the novel.

The novel was the basis of a 1949 musical film starring Gloria Jean as Polly.

== Plot ==
Polly Milton, a bright 14-year-old country girl who is sweet and kind, visits her friend Fanny Shaw and her wealthy family in Boston, Massachusetts for the first time. Polly is overwhelmed by the splendor of the Shaws' household and their urbanized, fashionable lifestyles, expensive clothes and other habits she has never been exposed to, and, for the most part, dislikes. Fanny's friends ignore her because of her different behavior and simple clothing, Fanny's brother Tom teases her, and Fanny herself can't help considering her unusual sometimes.

Despite feeling odd and out of place, and amid the new fashions and the constant demands of the Shaws, Polly keeps on being kind to the Shaw family, and eventually, her warmth, support, and kindness eventually win the hearts of all the family members, and her old-fashioned ways teach them a lesson they will never forget. Polly's actions touch the heart of Fanny's grandmother, who has the same ideals as Polly, and the two become fast friends. Polly grows closer to Fanny and creates strong bonds with Tom and his younger sister, Maud. After six weeks with the Shaws, Polly returns to her country home.

Over the next six years, Polly visits the Shaws every year and comes to be considered a member of the family. Six years after the events of the first several chapters, Grandma has died. Polly comes back to the city to become a music teacher. She learns that Tom is engaged to Fanny's bratty friend, Trix. Polly rents a room in the home of an elderly lady named Miss Mills, who tells her about a teenage girl named Jane who attempted suicide. Polly takes Jane under her wing and shows her that life is truly worth living.

Later, Polly goes to the opera with Fanny and Tom. They happen to meet Mr. Sydney, a friend of the Shaws. Though Polly never plays up her looks and normally dresses simply, on this particular night she dresses up in Fanny’s borrowed finery so she can make an impression. Mr. Sydney and Tom both take notice of Polly, and, enjoying the attention, Polly "innocently" flirts with both of them. Mr. Sydney becomes attracted to Polly, and lonely Polly enjoys the attention and appreciates Mr. Sydney’s friendship. He begins to learn her routine and “coincidentally” runs into her and accompanies her during her walks to her students’ homes.

When Fanny becomes suddenly gloomy one day, Polly understands that, since Fanny became a young woman so early in her life, she is already tired of life. She takes Fanny to visit her friends, Becky, Bess, and Kate, the latter happening to be an author Fanny is fond of. Becky is carving a statue that, she tells the other women, embodies feminism.

A few days later, Polly forces herself to let go of her love for Mr. Sydney, knowing that loving him will damage her relationship with Fanny, who fancies Mr. Sydney. Polly takes a different road to work so she won't see him in the streets anymore. However, their paths cross, and when Mr. Sydney offers to walk Polly home, she reluctantly turns him down, driving a rift between the two.

Later in the book, Tom tells Polly that he has wasted his money on frivolous expenditures and is now in great debt. Polly persuades him to tell his father. When he does, his father tells him that they are on the brink of bankruptcy. As the Shaws' lavish lives become laced with poverty, Polly guides them to the realization that wholesome family life is the only thing they will ever need, not money or decoration. Though Ms. Shaw has a difficult time adjusting, Tom, Fanny, Maud, and Mr. Shaw become a closer family. Furthermore, Tom's debts are paid by Mr. Sydney.

With the comfort of the ever-helpful Polly, the family changes for the better, and despite their lack of money, their lives become happier. After Trix calls off their engagement, Tom procures a job out West with Polly's brother Ned, and heads off to help his family and compensate for all the money he wasted. Throughout the year he is gone, Tom writes Polly letters telling them about a girl named Maria Bailey he and Ned have met. Fanny strikes up a relationship with Mr. Sydney, and the two get engaged.

A year later, Tom returns from the West and tells Polly that a couple has just gotten engaged. Polly assumes he means himself and Maria. Tom clarifies that it is actually Ned and Maria who are engaged, and that he could never love Maria, because he has loved Polly the whole time. They become engaged and look forward to spending the rest of their lives together. It is concluded that Maud never marries, but remains with her father, taking care of him and keeping house for him, but that Polly and Tom have a joyful married life.

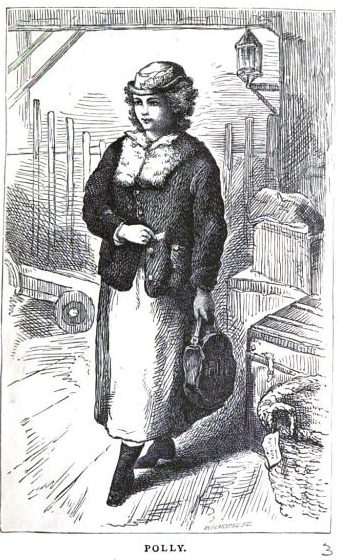
An original illustration of Polly

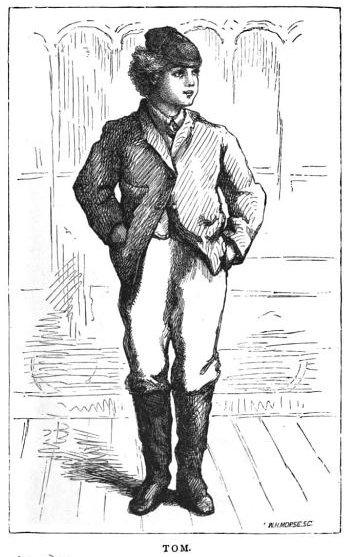
An original illustration of Tom

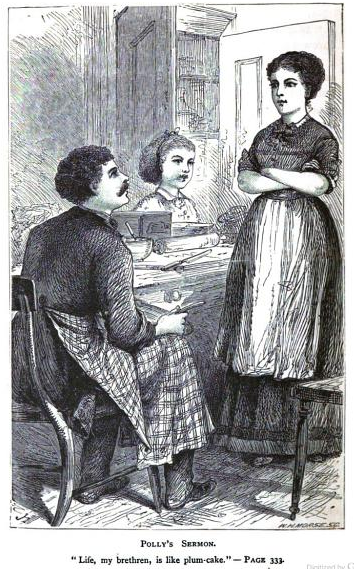
An original illustration of Polly teaching Tom and Fanny about how treasures in life are like plums in a cake

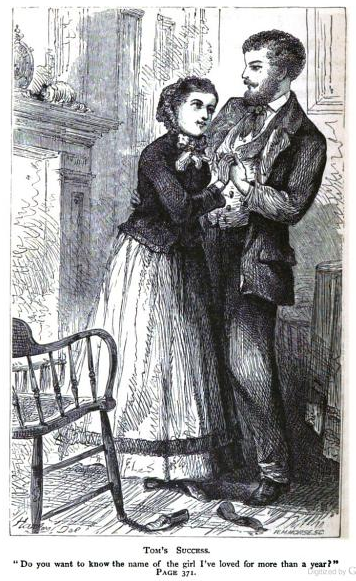
An original illustration of Polly and Tom celebrating their engagement

== Adaptations ==
The novel was the basis of a 1949 musical film starring Gloria Jean as Polly.

== Sources ==
- Anonymous review. The Daily Graphic [New York] [September 1875?]. Reprinted in Louisa May Alcott: the contemporary reviews. Ed. by Beverly Lyon Clark. Cambridge: Cambridge University Press, 2004. ISBN 0-521-82780-9.
- Anonymous review. The Literary World 6.4 (1 September 1875), 55. Reprinted in Louisa May Alcott: the contemporary reviews. Ed. by Beverly Lyon Clark. Cambridge: Cambridge University Press, 2004. ISBN 0-521-82780-9.
- Anonymous review. Taunton Daily Gazette 43.65 (18 September 1875), 2:1. Reprinted in Louisa May Alcott: the contemporary reviews. Ed. by Beverly Lyon Clark. Cambridge: Cambridge University Press, 2004. ISBN 0-521-82780-9.
- Lamb, Robert Paul, and Gary Richard Thompson. A Companion to American Fiction, 1865 - 1914. New Jersey: Wiley-Blackwell, 2006. ISBN 1-4051-0064-8.
- Macleod, Anne Scott (Spring 1992). "From Rational to Romantic: The Children of Children's Literature in the Nineteenth Century". Poetics Today. 13 (1): 141–153. doi:10.2307/1772794. JSTOR 1772794.
- Saxton, Martha. Louisa May Alcott: a modern biography. New York: Macmillan, 1994. ISBN 0-374-52460-2.
- Schultz, Lydia A. (Fall 2002). "'Work with a Purpose': Alcott's 'An Old-Fashioned Girl' and the American Work Ethic". College Literature. 29 (4): 26–46.
- Wadsworth, Sarah A. (2001). "Louisa May Alcott, William T. Adams, and the Rise of Gender-Specific Series Books". The Lion and the Unicorn. 25 (1): 17–46. doi:10.1353/uni.2001.0015.
