= Robin Hood: Men in Tights =

1993 film by Mel Brooks

- Theatrical release poster
- Directed by: Mel Brooks
- Screenplay by: Mel Brooks; J. David Shapiro
- Story by: J. David Shapiro
- Produced by: Mel Brooks
- Starring: Cary Elwes; Richard Lewis; Roger Rees; Amy Yasbeck; Dave Chappelle; Isaac Hayes; Tracey Ullman
- Cinematography: Michael D. O'Shea
- Edited by: Stephen E. Rivkin
- Music by: Hummie Mann
- Production companies: Brooksfilms; Gaumont
- Distributed by: 20th Century Fox (United States and Canada); Gaumont Buena Vista International (France); Columbia TriStar Film Distributors International (International)
- Release dates: July 28, 1993 (United States); December 15, 1993 (France)
- Running time: 104 minutes
- Countries: United States; France
- Language: English
- Budget: $20 million
- Box office: $72 million

Robin Hood: Men in Tights is a 1993 adventure comedy film and a parody of the Robin Hood story. The film was produced and directed by Mel Brooks, co-written by Brooks and J. David Shapiro based on a story by Shapiro, and stars Cary Elwes, Richard Lewis, and Dave Chappelle (in his film debut). It includes frequent comedic references to previous Robin Hood films, particularly Prince of Thieves (upon which the plot is loosely structured), and the 1938 Errol Flynn adaptation The Adventures of Robin Hood. Brooks himself had previously created the short-lived sitcom When Things Were Rotten in the mid-1970s, which also spoofed the Robin Hood legend.

The film also features Brooks in a minor role – the first time since Young Frankenstein he had appeared in one of his own films in which he does not receive top billing or play the lead role. In addition to Brooks, it features Brooks regulars Dom DeLuise and Dick Van Patten (who had been a cast member on When Things Were Rotten) in minor roles, as well as Rudy De Luca in a cameo as a party guest.

Reflecting its spoof nature, while some character names (such as Robin of Loxley and Maid Marian) remain unchanged from the source material, other names are altered: Nottingham becomes "Rottingham" and one of the Merry Men is given the name Will Scarlet O'Hara, referencing the character from Gone with the Wind. Brooks, being Jewish, changed his cameo character from Friar Tuck to "Rabbi Tuckman".

Though the film received mixed reviews from critics, it was a box-office success, grossing $72 million on a $20 million budget.

== Plot ==
Robin of Loxley is captured during the Crusades and is imprisoned in Jerusalem. With the help of fellow inmate Asneeze, he escapes and frees the other inmates. Upon returning to England, Robin finds Asneeze's son, Ahchoo, and discovers that Prince John has assumed control while King Richard is away fighting in the Crusades. Richard is unaware that the prince is abusing his power. Robin returns to his family home, Loxley Hall, only to find it being repossessed by John's men. His family's blind servant, Blinkin, informs Robin that his family is dead, and his father left him a key which opens "the greatest treasure in all the land."

Robin recruits Little John and Will Scarlet O'Hara to help regain his father's land and oust Prince John from the throne. On his quest, Robin attracts the attention of Maid Marian of Bagelle, who wants to find the man who has the key to her Everlast-branded chastity belt. They are also joined by Rabbi Tuckman, who shares with them his sacramental wine and bargain circumcisions.

While Robin is training his band of tights-clad Merry Men, the Sheriff of Rottingham hires the mafioso Don Giovanni to assassinate Robin at the Spring Festival. They plan to hold an archery tournament to attract Robin. Maid Marian hears of the plot, and sneaks out of her castle to warn Robin, accompanied by her heavyset German lady-in-waiting, Broomhilde.

At the archery tournament, a disguised Robin makes it to the final round, but loses after his arrow is split in two by his opponent. Confused that he lost, Robin reviews the movie's script to discover that he gets another shot. Giovanni's assassin attempts to kill Robin by shooting at him from the Royal Folio Depository with a scoped crossbow, but Blinkin catches the arrow in midair. Robin then takes the second shot, this time using a special "PATRIOT arrow", hitting the target. Robin is arrested, with Marian promising to marry the Sheriff to spare his life.

Robin and the Merry Men interrupt the wedding between the Sheriff and Maid Marian. She is carried off to the tower by the Sheriff, who wants to deflower her but cannot open her chastity belt. Robin arrives and duels the sheriff, during which Robin's key falls into the lock of Marian's chastity belt.

After winning the fight, Robin spares the Sheriff's life, only to miss his sheath and accidentally run the Sheriff through. The witch Latrine, Prince John's cook and adviser, saves him by giving him a magical Life Saver in exchange for marriage. Before Robin and Marian can attempt to open the lock, Broomhilde arrives, insisting they get married first. Rabbi Tuckman conducts the ceremony, but they are suddenly interrupted by King Richard, recently returned from the Crusades, who orders Prince John to be taken away to the Tower of London and made part of the tour.

Robin and Marian are married, and Ahchoo is made the new sheriff of Rottingham. That night, Robin and Maid Marian attempt to open the chastity belt, only to discover that even with the key, the lock won't open. The film ends with Robin calling for a locksmith.

== Cast ==
- Cary Elwes as Robin Hood
- Richard Lewis as Prince John
- Roger Rees as Sheriff of Rottingham
- Amy Yasbeck as Maid Marian
- Dave Chappelle as Ahchoo, son of Asneeze
- Mark Blankfield as Blinkin
- Eric Allan Kramer as Little John
- Matthew Porretta as Will Scarlet O'Hara
- Isaac Hayes as Asneeze
- Tracey Ullman as Latrine
- Patrick Stewart as King Richard
- Dom DeLuise as Don Giovanni
- Steve Tancora as Filthy Luca
- Joe Dimmick as Dirty Ezio
- Dick Van Patten as The Abbot
- Mel Brooks as Rabbi Tuckman
- Megan Cavanagh as Broomhilde
- Avery Schreiber as Tax Assessor
- Chuck McCann as Villager
- Brian George as Dungeon Maitre D' Falafel
- Clive Revill as Fire Marshall
- Carol Arthur as Complaining Villager
- Kelly Jones as Buxom Lass
- Clement von Franckenstein as Royal Announcer
- Robert Ridgely as The Hangman
- Corbin Allred as Young Lad
- Chase Masterson as Giggling Court Lady
- Steffon as Sherwood Forest Rapper
- David DeLuise as Villager
- Rudy De Luca as Party Guest

== Reception ==
=== Critical response ===
On the review aggregator website Rotten Tomatoes, 42% of 45 critics' reviews are positive. The website's consensus reads: "Undisciplined, scatological, profoundly silly, and often utterly groan-worthy, Robin Hood: Men in Tights still has an amiable, anything-goes goofiness that has made it a cult favorite." Metacritic, which uses a weighted average, assigned the film a score of 44 out of 100, based on 22 critics, indicating "mixed or average" reviews. Audiences polled by CinemaScore gave the film an average grade of "B" on an A+ to F scale. Over time, the film has developed a cult following.

Vincent Canby of The New York Times wrote, "What's missing is the kind of densely packed comic screenplay that helped to make Young Frankenstein and High Anxiety two of the most delectable movie parodies of the last 20 years. Men in Tights has the manner of something that wasn't argued over long enough. A few good gags are supplemented by dozens of others that still need to be worked on or tossed out entirely." Caryn James wrote, "Men in Tights is not as relentlessly clever and comic as his '70s films, but its funniest moments prove that Mr. Brooks has not lost his shrewd, nutty irreverence." Gene Siskel of the Chicago Tribune gave the film half of one star out of four and called it "a most disappointing Mel Brooks movie parody that suggests that the once hilarious Brooks has lost his way. The pacing is agonizingly slow, and many of the jokes are recycled from his earlier, better work." On At the Movies, Siskel's colleague Roger Ebert criticized the jokes and pacing and said he "genuinely didn't laugh once," and compared Brooks's circumcision jokes to a "second rate Friars Club roast." Both critics gave the film a "thumbs down."

Rita Kempley of The Washington Post called it "a pointless and untimely lampoon of Robin Hood: Prince of Thieves from the increasingly creaky spoofmeister Mel Brooks." Peter Rainer of the Los Angeles Times was mixed, writing that "what's enjoyable about the best parts of Men in Tights is its grab-bag, throwaway style", but also finding "something a little dutiful and desperate about portions of the film, as if Brooks were trying to capture an audience he didn't really connect with." Jay Boyar of the Orlando Sentinel called the film "crashingly unfunny" and a sign that "the 67-year old comedian's sense of humor isn't nearly as sharp as it once was." In his book, Reel Bad Arabs, Jack Shaheen saw the movie positively, describing it as a "funny fable" that spoofs Robin Hood: Prince of Thieves, containing "harmless visual and verbal puns".

=== Box office ===
Robin Hood: Men in Tights debuted at number six at the weekend box office in the United States, with a gross of $6.8 million and a total of over $10 million, after opening on the previous Wednesday. Fox was reportedly "thrilled" with the film's performance.

The film went on to gross $35.7 million in the United States and Canada. It is Brooks' fifth-highest-grossing film. Internationally it grossed $36.3 million for a worldwide total of $72 million.

== Soundtrack ==
Title	Artist	Written by
"Men in Tights"	The Merry Men Singers (Steve Lively, Randy Crenshaw, Kerry Katz, Geoff Koch & Rick Logan)	Mel Brooks
"Marian"	Debbie James	Mel Brooks
"Sherwood Forest Rap"	Kevin Dorsey & The Merry Men Singers	Mel Brooks
"The Night Is Young and You're So Beautiful"	Arthur Rubin & the Merry Men Singers	Billy Rose, Irving Kahal (music by Dana Suesse)
"Marian" (end credit duet)	Cathy Dennis & Lance Ellington	Mel Brooks, Diane Warren
"Row, Row, Row Your Boat"	uncredited	
"Hava Nagila"	uncredited	
"Bridal Chorus"	uncredited	Richard Wagner
"Rule, Britannia!"	uncredited	James Thomson, Thomas Arne

== Home media ==
Robin Hood: Men in Tights was released via LaserDisc and VHS in 1994 by Fox Video. A Region 1 DVD was released by 20th Century Fox Home Entertainment and was doubled-featured with Spaceballs on February 6, 2007. Columbia TriStar also released the film on DVDs, VHS and LaserDisc in other territories from 1994 to 2002, while Sony Pictures Home Entertainment re-released the DVDs from 2006 to 2016. The film was released on Blu-ray on May 11, 2010, and was re-released in a DVD Combo Pack on October 1, 2018, in the United States, Fabulous Films on April 22, 2019, in Europe, and Umbrella Entertainment on December 15, 2021, in Australia.

== See also ==
- List of films and television series featuring Robin Hood
