= The Jivin' Jacks and Jills =

The Jivin' Jacks and Jills were an American dance group of the World War II era.

The group was assembled by Universal Pictures via open audition. The intent was to assemble a group of young dancers with appeal to a teen audience. John Mattison and Louis DaPron were the group's choreographer. The Jivin' Jacks and Jills first appeared in the 1942 musical What's Cookin'? and appeared in 14 movies altogether. Their high-energy style may be contrasted with the more precision-oriented approach of rival musical-film studio MGM.

There were originally fourteen members in the group, all teenagers, among them future stars Donald O'Connor and Peggy Ryan. Other members included Roland Dupree, Bobby Scheerer, Dottie Babb, Dolores Mitchell, Jack McGee, Grace MacDonald, Jean McNab, Jane McNab, David Holt, and Corky Geil. Membership was fluid: at the time of Chip Off the Old Block (1944) there were twenty members: Scheerer and Harold Bell, Jerry Antes, Jack Coffey, Dante DiPaolo, Lowell McPeek, Lou Payetta, Pat Phelan, George Rowland, Jerry Singer, Ronald Stanton, Jean Davis, Dorothy Web, Shirley Mills, Peggy Brant, Elaine Campbell, Arlyne Gladden, Verda Jenkins, Irma Jeter, Lu Anne Jones, Iris Kirksey, Connie Roberts, and Barbara Strong (O'Connor and Ryan were by this time separately billed stars). Helene Stanley, then going under the name Dolores Diane, was at one time a member. Tommy Rall was at one time a member.

In Private Buckaroo, the Jivin' Jacks and Jills performed a dance number to "Don't Sit Under the Apple Tree (with Anyone Else but Me)", which became one of the Andrews Sisters' biggest hits. In Mister Big the group performed "Rude, Crude, and Unattractive". This was the breakout film for group members Donald O'Conner and Peggy Ryan. Because of the rising popularity of O'Connor and Ryan, the movie was re-shot to include more dance scenes for the pair, was retitled (from School For Jive), and was distributed as an A movie. Although O'Connor was probably the group's weakest dancer at first, he went on to become a star.

The group gave its name to the "Jivin' Jacks and Jills Hollywood Reunion", a reunion originally of Universal players (not just the dance team) later expanded to all Hollywood personalities, which was hosted for many years by Michael G. Fitzgerald in Studio City.

== Filmography ==
The Jivin' Jacks and Jills' appeared in 14 films:

- What's Cookin'? (1942)
- Private Buckaroo (1942)
- Trumpet Serenade (short, 1942)
- Give Out, Sisters (1942)
- Get Hep to Love (1942)
- Moonlight in Havana (1942)
- Always a Bridesmaid (1943)
- Mister Big (1943)
- Moonlight in Vermont (1943)
- Jitterbugs (1943)
- Chip Off the Old Block (1944)
- Patrick the Great (1945)
