= Holy Terror =

The Holy Terror or Holy Terror may refer to:

== Music ==
- Holy Terror (album), a funk/spoken word album by The Last Poets
- Holy Terror (band), a thrash metal band
- Holy terror hardcore, an early style of metalcore pioneered by Cleveland bands Integrity and Ringworm
  - Holy Terror Records, an independent record label owned by Dwid Hellion, vocalist for Integrity

== Literature ==
- Holy Terror (graphic novel), a 2011 graphic novel by Frank Miller
- Batman: Holy Terror, an Elseworlds one-shot from DC Comics
- Les Enfants terribles (The Holy Terrors) a 1929 novel by Jean Cocteau, translated with this English title in 1955
- The Holy Terror (Goodman novel), a 1959 novel within Paul Goodman's The Empire City epic novel tetralogy
- The Holy Terror (Wells novel), a 1939 novel by H.G. Wells
- The Holy Terror (short story collection), a 1932 Simon Templar novel by Leslie Charteris

== Film and television ==
- Holy Terror, an alternative title for the 1976 horror film Alice, Sweet Alice
- The Holy Terror (1929 film), an Our Gang short
- The Holy Terror (1937 film), directed by James Tinling
- The Holy Terror (1965 film), a Hallmark Hall of Fame television film

== Other uses ==
- The Holy Terror (audio drama), an audio drama based on the television show Doctor Who
- Holy Terror, houseboat built at the shipyard of James Lenox for William Gillette
- Holy Terror, capitalised political term used in book of same name by Amir Taheri 1987
