= Cafe Crown =

1942 three-act play by Hy Kraft

Cafe Crown is a three-act play by Hy Kraft that premiered on Broadway on January 23, 1942, at the Cort Theatre. The cast included Sam Jaffe and Morris Carnovsky. Its action presented "a motley group of amiable squatters found in a Second Avenue restaurant ... members of the Yiddish theatre", 21 characters in all. Elia Kazan directed and Boris Aronson designed the set. Brooks Atkinson, writing in The New York Times, called it a "hospitable comedy", "simple but warm-hearted", set in the cafe where:

Every one knows every one else. Business is conducted with tremendous outbursts of temperament. No one has any secrets and no one stands on ceremony. They are not exactly one happy family, but they are clannish, emotional, self-contained, cultivated, and loyal to Second Avenue.

It ended its run on May 23 after 140 performances. It was revived at the Public Theatre in 1988 with Eli Wallach and Anne Jackson. It moved to Broadway, pared to two acts, in the spring of 1989 and ran for 45 performances.

A musical version with the same name premiered in 1964. It had music by Albert Hague, lyrics by Marty Brill and a book by Kraft. It opened in previews on Broadway at the Martin Beck Theatre on March 21, 1964. After 30 preview performances, the musical officially opened on April 17, 1964. It received less than stellar reviews and closed after three performances on April 18. The Broadway musical version starred actors Sam Levene and Theodore Bikel and co-starred Alan Alda, sopranos Monte Amundsen and Brenda Lewis, dancer Tommy Rall, and Betty Aberlin.
