= Eva Dell'Acqua =

Belgian singer and composer

Eva Dell'Acqua (also Dall'Acqua, 28 January 1856, Schaerbeek – 12 February 1930, Ixelles) was a Belgian singer and composer of Italian ancestry. She wrote fifteen operas and operettas, as well as orchestral works, pieces for chamber orchestra, and other works for piano and solo voice. Dell'Acqua's song "Villanelle" for coloratura soprano has been widely performed and recorded, and has appeared on film soundtracks including Get Hep to Love (1942) and I Married an Angel (1942).

== Biography ==
Eva Dell'Acqua was born in 1856 in Schaerbeek, Brussels, Belgium, the daughter of the Italian painter Cesare Dell'Acqua and his wife Carolina van der Elst. Dell'Acqua had a younger sister, Aline, born July 18th, 1857.

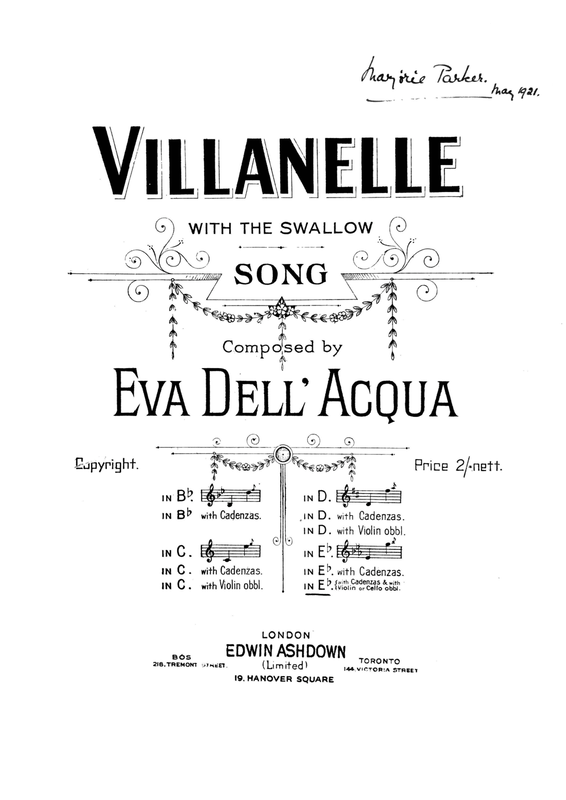
Sheet music of 'Villanelle' with translation, published ca. 1910

Dell'Acqua's name does not appear in documents from the Royal Conservatory of Brussels, suggesting that her formal music education took place at home through private instruction. Given her father's connections within Brussels' artistic circles, she may have had access to influential musicians in the city, though no specific teacher has been definitively identified. She also shared patrons with her father, like the Errera and van der Elst families. Dell'Acqua is known to have collaborated with Frédéric van der Elst, André Lénéka, de Launay, Varin, Desvergers, Paul Errera, and Angèle van Loo.

Dell'Acqua composed in the Romantic style and produced orchestral works, pieces for chamber orchestra, and other works for piano and solo voice, opera and stage. Publishers' catalogs list approximately 57 mélodies, of which only 38 scores survive, 19 are unlocated as of April 2026, and 14 additional titles are of uncertain origin due to possible duplication under variant titles or translations. She was active in the Brussels art scene during the Belle Époque, particularly within salon culture and private theatre tradition. She mostly composed vocal works, including fifteen operas and operettas. Her work used 'characteristic dance rhythms'. Dell'Acqua's lyrical œuvre includes both small-scale salon works and larger theatre compositions, demonstrating a range of scales, instrumentation, and dramaturgical ambition. Her earlier work was often performed privately at the time, in Brussels and Paris, although five works are recorded to have been performed widely in Belgium. Those five include the 1890 La ruse de Pierrette (translated as Pierrot the Liar), in which Dell'Acqua sang the title role of Pierrette. Her operettas La bachelette (1895), Tambour battant (1900), and Zizi (1906) were all performed publicly at the Théâtre Royal des Galeries in the Royal Saint-Hubert Galleries.

In terms of instrumental work, Dell'Acqua composed approximately 14 instrumental works, including four published works, six surviving manuscripts, and four works known only through references in literature. Incomplete dating in manuscripts and publishing catalogs make it difficult to establish reliable chronologies.

Dell'Acqua's song "Villanelle" for coloratura soprano has been widely performed and recorded, and has appeared on film soundtracks including Get Hep to Love (1942) and I Married an Angel (1942). Dell'Acqua died on 12 February 1930 in Ixelles, Brussels, Belgium.

== Works ==
Bezdelīga

=== Instrumental ===
- Gavotte pour Piano et Violoncelle (1889)
- Aveu romance (1891)
- Romance pour violon avec accompagnement de piano (1891)
- Sérénade joyeuse (1897)
- Aline. Polka pour piano (1910)
- Tambour battant (1910)
- Tirailleurs (1910)
- Valse nº 1 (1912)
- Valse lente (1912)
- Sac au dos (1914)
- Gavotte
- Italia. Polka Mazurka
- Menuet. Air de ballet
- Valse pour piano

=== Mélodies ===
- Ghazel (1892)
- Pourquoi rêver? (1892)
- Quand même (1892)
- Reproche (1892)
- Dernier vœu (1899)
- C'est une fauvette (1902)
- Le coffret (1902)
- Demande (1903)
- Pour la bercer (1906)
- Le printemps est là (1906)
- Vains regrets (1906)
- Ne cherchez pas (1910)
- Pour l'avril vainqueur (1911)
- Le ravin (1911)
- Au jardin de mon cœur
- Enfant, pourquoi pleurer
- Je voudrais
- Les roses de Saadi
- Soir de rêve

=== Operettas and opéras comiques ===
- Une passion (1880)
- Le prince noir (1882)
- Le trésor de l'Emir (1883)
- Quintin Metzys (1884)
- Le secret de l'Alcade (1887)
- Les fiançailles de Pasquin (1888)
- Feu de paille (1889)
- L'oeillet blanc (1889)
- Au clair de lune (1891)
- La bachelette (1895)
- Une ruse de Pierrette (1890)
- Le guzla (1895)
- Tambour battant (1900)
- Zizi (1906)
- Pierrot menteur (1918)
- La visite imprévue (1921)
- Marraine de guerre (1921-1922)
- L'oiseau bleu

=== Other vocal works ===
- Chanson de mai (1878)
- Amour défunt (1894)
- Aubade
- Chanson provençale (1899)
- Villanelle (1889)
- Menuet (1892)
- Noël d'enfant (1892)
- La valse des songes (1893)
- Sonnet d'amour (1896)
- Sérénade joyeuse (1897)
- Reviens! (1899)
- La Vièrge à la Crèche (1899)
- Bonjour Suzon (1902)
- Prière (1902)
- Je donnerais (1903)
- Les songes. Valse (1903)
- Les étoiles filantes (1904)
- Les anciens souvenirs (1905)
- Dors, mon chéri (1905)
- Mignarde (1905)
- Résignation (1906)
- Rondel sur l'eau (1906)
- A Mignonne (1907)
- Le pays du bonheur (1907)
- En regardant vos mains (1909)
- La chanson du rouet (1910)
- Le clavecin (1910)
- Ein Traumbild (1910)
- Kehre zurück (1910)
- Liebesbitte (1910)
- Liebes Sonnet (1910)
- Première feuille (1910)
- Prière d'amour (1910)
- Prière d'enfant (1910)
- Quand les pommiers sont fleuris (1910)
- Ritournelle. Joli mai (1910)
- Si vous consentiez (1910)
- Springtime (1910)
- Trüben Tage sind gekommen (1910)
- Valse tendre (1910)
- Verlassen
- Virelai. Ils sont venus les jours moroses... (1910)
- Vision (1910)
- État d'âme (1911)
- Sac au dos (1914)
- Droombeeld (1916)
- Nanette et son Seigneur (1919)
- A des yeux
- Le baiser d'Eunice
- J'ai dit aux fleurs
- Rondel à l'absente
- Une sérénade
