= The Under-Pup =

- Theatrical release poster
- Directed by: Richard Wallace
- Written by: Grover Jones (screenplay); I. A. R. Wylie (story)
- Produced by: Joe Pasternak
- Starring: Gloria Jean; Robert Cummings
- Cinematography: Hal Mohr
- Edited by: Frank Gross
- Music by: Charles Previn
- Distributed by: Universal Pictures
- Release date: September 1, 1939 (United States)
- Running time: 88 minutes
- Country: United States
- Language: English
- Budget: over $465,000

The Under-Pup is a 1939 American feature film by Richard Wallace that introduced soprano singing star Gloria Jean to the screen.

== Plot ==
Pip-Emma Binns is a New York tomboy with 11 uncles, who wear uniforms and teach her the professional tricks of their trades. Pip-Emma is invited—as a charity case—to a summer camp for wealthy girls. The snobby "Purple Order of Penguins" resent Pip-Emma's brash behavior, plain-spoken opinions, and streetwise skills learned from her uncles, and she is bullied by the other girls. Her only girlfriend is Janet Cooper, a poor little rich girl whose parents are on the verge of divorce. Pip-Emma calls upon her beloved grandfather to visit Janet's parents and talk some sense into them. Camp counselor Priscilla Adams and her football-playing suitor Dennis Lane carry on a reluctant romance while trying to sort out Pip-Emma's problems. Camp caretaker Tolio befriends Pip-Emma while his two bratty sons pester her. Pip-Emma stands up for herself and wins everyone over, including the girl who had bullied her the most.

== Cast ==
- Gloria Jean - Pip-Emma Binns
- Robert Cummings - Dennis Lane
- Nan Grey - Priscilla Adams
- C. Aubrey Smith - Grandpa
- Beulah Bondi - Miss Thornton
- Virginia Weidler - Janet Cooper
- Margaret Lindsay - Mrs. Cooper
- Raymond Walburn - Mr. Layton
- Ann Gillis - Letty Lou
- Paul Cavanagh - Mr. Franklin Cooper
- Billy Gilbert - Tolio
- Shirley Mills - Cecilia Layton
- Bill Lenhart and Kenneth Brown as Tolio's sons
- Frank Jenks as Uncle Dan
- Doris Lloyd - Mrs. Binns
- Dickie Moore - Jerry Binns
- Ernest Truex - George Binns
- Selmer Jackson as Mrs. Cooper's attorney
- Harry Hayden as Mr. Cooper's attorney
- Samuel S. Hinds as Dr. McKay
- Cecil Kellaway as Mr. Wendelhares
- Jean Porter as Penguin member

== Production ==
The screenplay by Grover Jones was based on a story by I.A.R. Wylie, which was published in 1938.

Joe Pasternak held extensive auditions to find the lead throughout 1938, during which he discovered Gloria Jean. She later recalled:

There were hundreds of beautiful little girls there [at the audition]. I had been grabbed out of the sandbox, and I didn’t look so nice. I had pigtails and my teeth were a little crooked. But that’s what Joe liked.... I said, ‘I can’t sing, the piano’s out of tune.’ My mother almost shot me. Joe said, ‘I like this kid. Let’s get the piano tuned and bring her back tomorrow.’ I got all kinds of lectures on the way home about being a little more subdued. When I sang the next day, I knew it went very well.

Filming took place from May to June 1939. It was originally budgeted at $445,000.

Robert Cummings had just appeared in Three Smart Girls Grow Up and been signed to a long-term contract with Universal. Although The Under-Pup was his first above-the-title lead, he was overshadowed by screen newcomer Gloria Jean, on whom the publicity was focused.

== Reception ==
The film had its premiere in Gloria Jean's hometown of Scranton, Pennsylvania on Thursday, August 24, 1939. As Gloria Jean's biographers recounted, "In a surprise move that amazed both the studio publicity men and the national press corps, the local coal miners declared a strike, and shut down the community's major industry for the day in Gloria's honor."

Variety called the film "surefire entertainment" and singled out Gloria Jean: "Typical American girl of her age, youngster has warm poise, winsome personality, and a screen presence that is remarkable considering this is the first time she faced the cameras."

The film was well received, and was followed by an unofficial sequel, A Little Bit of Heaven (1940). Many of the cast members from The Under-Pup appear in the second film, but with different character names.

In 1946, Hollywood studios joined forces to create a special film library of feature films, intended specifically for children's matinées. All the studios contributed a few of their greatest hits with juvenile appeal; Universal supplied The Under-Pup.

== Radio adaptation ==
The film script was adapted for radio and was presented on Lux Radio Theater on April 15, 1940, with Gloria Jean and Nan Grey reprising their film roles.
