= The Night Is Young and You're So Beautiful =

1936 song by Irving Kahal & Billy Rose

"The Night Is Young and You're So Beautiful" is a 1936 song written by Irving Kahal and Billy Rose, with music by Dana Suesse.

It was made popular after singer Dean Martin released a cover of the song in 1947. Singer Jack Jones included the song on his 1965 album There's Love & There's Love & There's Love, which spotlighted several traditional pop standards.

The song was featured in the 1993 comedy film Robin Hood: Men in Tights, directed by Mel Brooks.
