= Joe E. Lewis =

American singer (1902–1971)

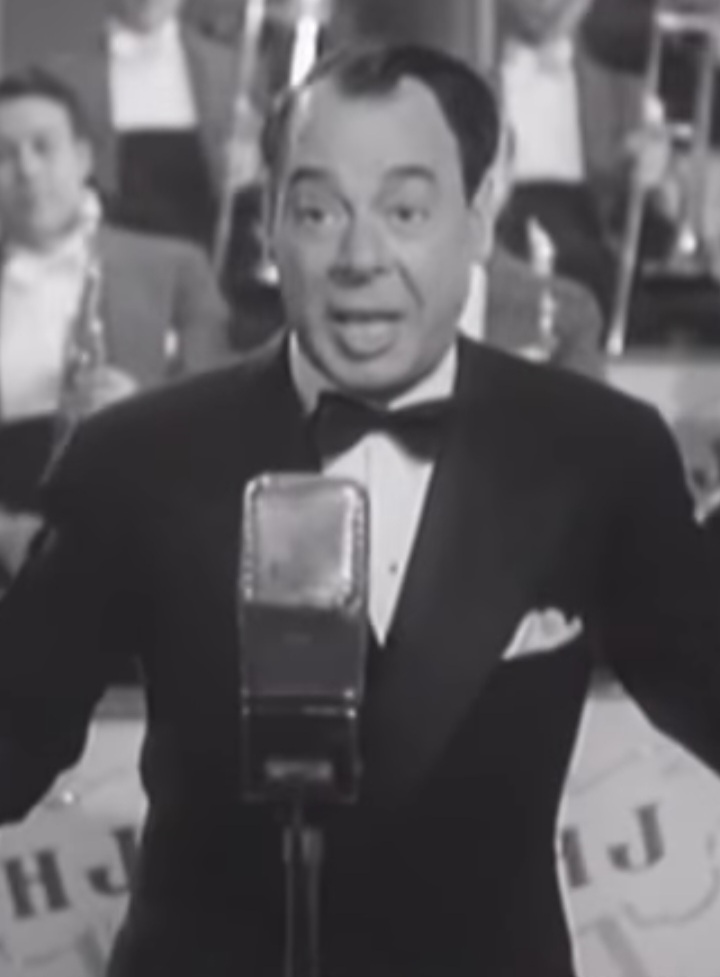
- Lewis in Private Buckaroo (1942)
- Born: Joseph Klewan; January 12, 1902; New York City, U.S.
- Died: June 4, 1971 (aged 69); New York City, U.S.
- Resting place: Cedar Park Cemetery, Emerson, New Jersey
- Other name: Joey Lewis
- Occupations: Comedian; actor; singer
- Years active: 1926–1971
- Spouse: Martha Stewart (m. 1946; div. 1948)

Joe E. Lewis (born Joseph Klewan; January 12, 1902 – June 4, 1971) was an American comedian, actor, and singer.

== Early life ==
Lewis was born to Russian Jewish immigrant parents on January 12, 1902 in New York City, New York. He added the E. to distinguish himself from the boxer.

Dropping out of De Witt Clinton High School after two years, the 15‐year‐old Lewis enlisted in the Marine Corps, but was found out and released. He got into third‐rate burlesque and vaudeville in 1923.

He made his breakthrough as a nightclub star in Chicago in the days of what he liked to call “the Great Drought,” Prohibition. As portrayed in his 1957 biographic film, The Joker Is Wild, Lewis started out as a popular crooner in a gang-owned speakeasy during the prohibition years of the 1920s.

== Biography ==
=== Gangster assault ===
In Chicago in 1927, Lewis refused the request of Jack "Machine Gun" McGurn (a lieutenant of Al Capone) to renew a contract that would have bound him to sing and perform at the Green Mill Cocktail Lounge, which was partly owned by Capone. He refused, because he had been offered more money by a rival gang to appear at their own club, The New Rendezvous.

According to a Chicago Tribune account the day after the assault, on November 8, 1927, Lewis was stabbed repeatedly at his hotel room at the Commonwealth Hotel by three assailants. According to police, Lewis "had lived for months in fear that he was to be assassinated." Lewis said he was about to sign a contract at the Rendezvous cafe at a salary of $1,000 a week; at the time he was getting $600 a week singing at the Green Mill. Lewis identified McGurn as threatening to "take him for a ride" if he went to the Rendezvous. The Green Mill's owner denied McGurn's involvement. Lewis suffered twelve cuts, nearly all on the face and head, and was so seriously hurt that physicians initially held little hope for his recovery. The enforcers, who included Sam Giancana and Leonard "Needles" Gianola, cut the singer's throat and tongue and left him for dead. He spent six weeks in the hospital and required a long recovery. At the time of the assault, Lewis was described as "Joseph Lewis" and as a "cabaret singer and comedian."

Capone, who was fond of Lewis, was displeased with the assault, but would not take action against one of his top lieutenants. He instead gave Lewis $10,000 (equal to $185,345 today) to recover properly and eventually resume his career.

=== Subsequent career ===
Lewis toured in the USO shows with Ray Bolger in the Pacific Theater during World War II. Joe appeared in the movies "Too Many Husbands" (the 1931 short comedy), Private Number (1936), The Holy Terror (1937), Private Buckaroo (1942), and (playing himself) Lady in Cement (1968). He appeared frequently on The Ed Sullivan Show, was the "Mystery Guest" three times on What's My Line?, and was interviewed on Person to Person in 1956. In 1946 he married actress Martha Stewart; they divorced in 1948. Random House published Lewis' biography, The Joker Is Wild, written by Art Cohn, in 1955.

Lewis and Frank Sinatra had a longtime friendship predating Sinatra's portrayal of the comedian in The Joker Is Wild. In 1961, Sinatra signed Lewis to record for his label, Reprise Records. The result, It Is Now Post Time, is one of the first LPs released by Reprise, and one of the few recorded examples of Lewis at work as a stand-up comedian. The title references a well-known part of his act, holding up a drink on stage and saying “Post time!” This is a horse racing term, meaning the race is about to start; its use here implies that the drinker is about to start on a long binge. On his live album Sinatra at the Sands (1966), Sinatra says that even though he recently celebrated his 50th birthday, he would have the body of a 22-year-old man "if I hadn't spent all those years drinking with Joe E. Lewis."

== Death ==
Lewis died of a heart attack in 1971, aged 69, and was buried in Cedar Park Cemetery, Emerson, New Jersey. He was reportedly in a diabetic coma at the time of his death.

== Filmography ==
- The Big Show (1926) – Abie
- Private Number (1936) – Smiley Watson
- The Holy Terror (1937) – Pelican Beek
- Private Buckaroo (1942) – Lancelot Pringle McBiff
- Lady in Cement (1968) – Himself (uncredited; final appearance)
