= Louis DaPron =

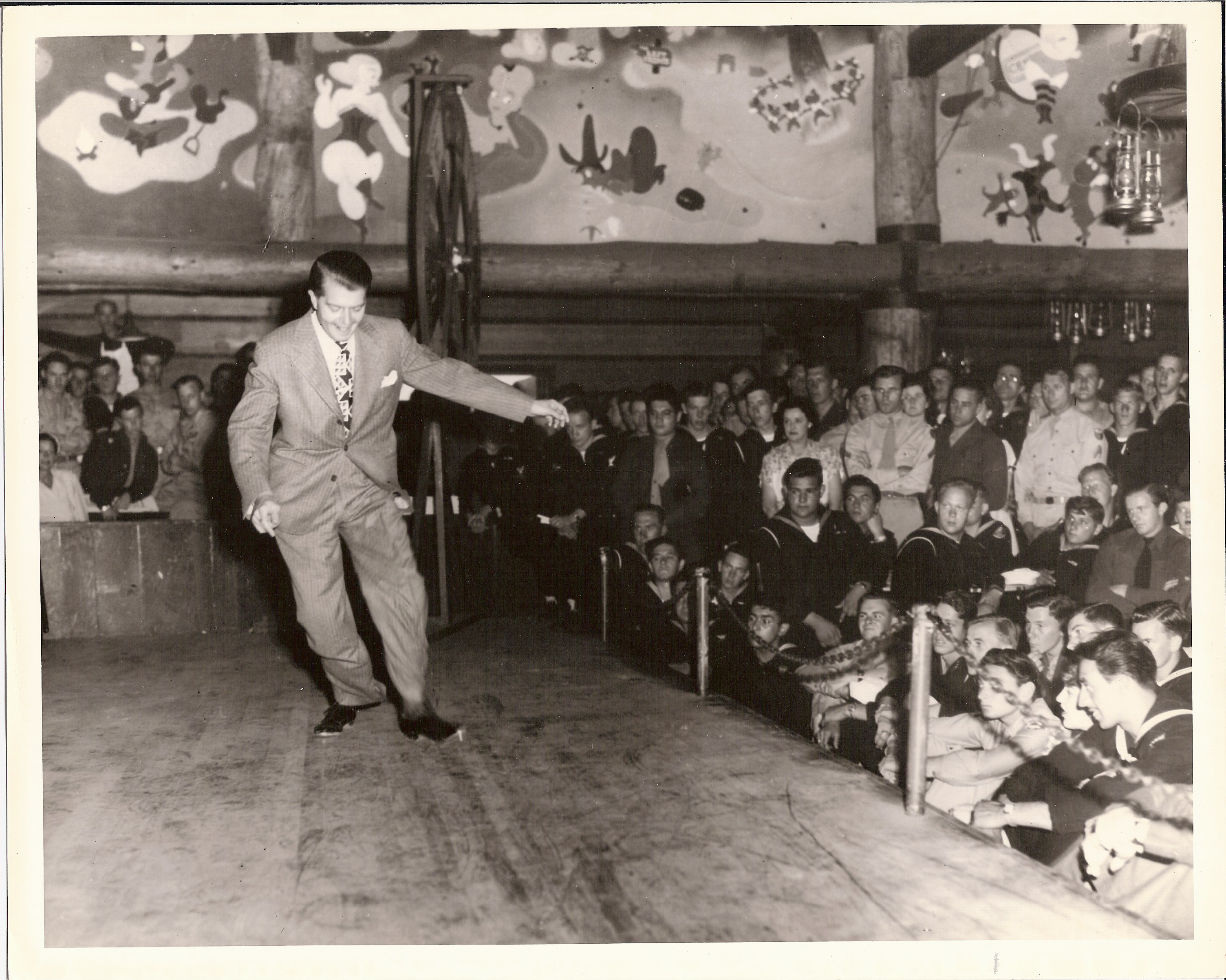
- Louis DaPron
- Born: February 13, 1913; Indiana, U.S.
- Died: July 21, 1987 (aged 74); Agoura, California, U.S.
- Occupations: Tap dancer, choreographer, teacher

Louis Francis DaPron (February 13, 1913 – July 21, 1987) was an American dancer, choreographer and dance instructor. He worked often with tap dancer Donald O'Connor.

== Early days ==
His parents were Elizabeth Kurtz (b. around 1890) and Louis I DaPron, and the family shows up on the 1930 Federal Census as living in Denver. Both parents were professional dancers, and at some point in the 1930s they settled in Hollywood to open a dance school.

== Professional beginnings ==
Louis, who had been dancing and teaching dance with his parents since he was a child, was hired by choreographer LeRoy Prinz and actor/choreographer Nick Castle in 1936 to assist with dance direction for films at Paramount. He seems not to have been under contract, but to have worked for various studios for the next few years. By 1941 he was the primary choreographer for Ruby Keeler in Columbia Pictures' Sweetheart of the Campus, her last musical film.

== Universal ==
In 1941, Universal Studios was assembling a group of the best teenage dancers in the country for a dance group to be marketed as the "Jivin' Jacks and Jills" in musical comedy films, and DaPron was put under contract by Universal to be the choreographer for this group. The Jivin' Jacks and Jills were popular with teen audiences, primarily for the dancing and comedy efforts of Donald O'Connor and Peggy Ryan, who were frequently teamed together. As O’Connor became increasingly popular, Universal focused on him, and the Jivin’ Jacks and Jills were disbanded after 14 films. DaPron stayed on, as O'Connor's choreographer and as head choreographer at Universal, a role he retained well into the 1950s. In 1948, DaPron served as dance director and appeared as a bartender in Are You with It?; he also received a specialty cast credit in Feudin', Fussin' and A-Fightin'.

== Television ==
DaPron provided choreography for The Colgate Comedy Hour, again working with Donald O'Connor, and The Louis DaPron dancers were regulars on the popular Perry Como Show from 1955 to 1960.
