= Wonder Valley =

1953 film

- Directed by: Jo Graham
- Written by: Frederick Jackson; Viva Ruth Liles
- Produced by: Viva Ruth Liles
- Starring: Gloria Jean
- Cinematography: Feston Leonard Jr. Henry Sharp
- Edited by: George Amy; Michael R. McAdam
- Music by: Marge Patric; Pat Patrick
- Production company: Liles Wonder State Motion Pictures
- Release date: December 1953
- Running time: 73 minutes
- Country: United States
- Language: English

Wonder Valley is a 1953 American film starring Gloria Jean.

It was shot in Arkansas in 1951 and is considered a lost film. It is believed to be the first motion picture shot entirely in Arkansas.

== Cast ==
- Gloria Jean
- Lance Devro
- John Fontaine
- Walter Kingsford
- then-Arkansas Gov. Sid McMath as himself
