= Giorgio Tozzi =

American bass singer (1923–2011)

- Giorgio Tozzi in Simon Boccanegra
- Born: January 8, 1923; Chicago, Illinois, U.S.
- Died: May 30, 2011 (aged 88); Bloomington, Indiana, U.S.
- Occupation: Operatic bass

Giorgio Tozzi (January 8, 1923 – May 30, 2011) was an American operatic bass. He was associated with the Metropolitan Opera for many years and sang principal bass roles in nearly every major opera house worldwide.

== Career ==
Giorgio Tozzi in Medea, Teatro La Fenice, Venice.

Tozzi was born George John Tozzi in Chicago, Illinois. He studied at DePaul University with Rosa Raisa, Giacomo Rimini and John Daggett Howell. He later studied singing in New York City with Beverley Peck Johnson. He made his professional debut in the Broadway production of Britten's The Rape of Lucretia in 1948 as Tarquinius. His signature roles included Figaro in Mozart's The Marriage of Figaro, Philip II in Verdi's Don Carlo, Hans Sachs in Wagner's Die Meistersinger von Nürnberg, and Méphistophélès in Gounod's Faust.

Tozzi made his debut at the Metropolitan Opera on March 9, 1956, as Alvise in Ponchielli's "La Gioconda". Over the next 20 years, he sang more than 500 performances with the company in the "old house" at 39th Street and Broadway, the "new house" at Lincoln Center, and on tour.

In 1957 he portrayed the title role in a nationally broadcast performance of Mussorgsky's Boris Godunov with the NBC Opera Theatre.

In 1958, he created the role of The Doctor in Samuel Barber's Vanessa. In July 1958, Tozzi also recorded an album alongside Dame Julie Andrews in the operetta Rose Marie. The album was conducted by Lehman Engel, with the New Symphony Orchestra of London. Tozzi was the recipient of three Grammy Awards: in 1960 the Grammy Award for Best Classical Performance, Operatic or Choral for The Marriage of Figaro with Erich Leinsdorf; in 1961 the Grammy Award for Best Opera Recording for Puccini's Turandot, with Erich Leinsdorf; and in 1963 the Grammy Award for Best Opera Recording for Sir Georg Solti's recording of Verdi's Aida (with Leontyne Price and Jon Vickers). Tozzi also sang the bass part in the recording of Sir Thomas Beecham's version of Handel's Messiah for RCA Victor in 1959.

After dubbing the singing voice for the character of Emile de Becque (portrayed by Rossano Brazzi) in the 1958 film version of South Pacific, Tozzi spent many years playing the role of de Becque himself in various revivals and road tours of the show, including one at Lincoln Center in the late 1960s. In a return to live national television in 1964, he collaborated with the conductor Alfredo Antonini in the role of Herod in CBS Television's adaptation of Berlioz's oratorio L'enfance du Christ. In 1980, Tozzi earned a Tony Award nomination for Best Leading Actor in a Musical for his work as Tony in The Most Happy Fella.

Tozzi was a professor at the Juilliard School, Brigham Young University, and Indiana University. He served as Distinguished Professor of Voice at Indiana University's Jacobs School of Music from 1991 until he retired in 2006.

Tozzi also acted on television and appeared on several TV shows in the 1970s and 1980s, including The Odd Couple, Baretta, Kojak, and Knight Rider.

In 1997, Tozzi published a novel, The Golem of the Golden West.

== Personal life ==
Tozzi was twice married. He first married Catherine Dieringer, who died in 1963; in 1967 he married Monte Amundsen, a singer, with whom he had a son and a daughter.

Tozzi died on May 30, 2011, in Bloomington, Indiana, aged 88, of a heart attack.

== Partial filmography ==
- South Pacific (1958) – Emile De Becque (singing voice)
- Die Meistersinger von Nürnberg (1971) – Hans Sachs
- Shamus (1973) – Dottore
