= Don't Sit Under the Apple Tree (with Anyone Else but Me) =

1942 song made famous by Glenn Miller and by the Andrews Sisters

- 1942 sheet music featuring Glenn Miller

Song
- Published: 1942 by Robbins Music
- Genre: Pop; big band; jazz
- Songwriters: Lew Brown and Charles Tobias
- Composer: Sam H. Stept

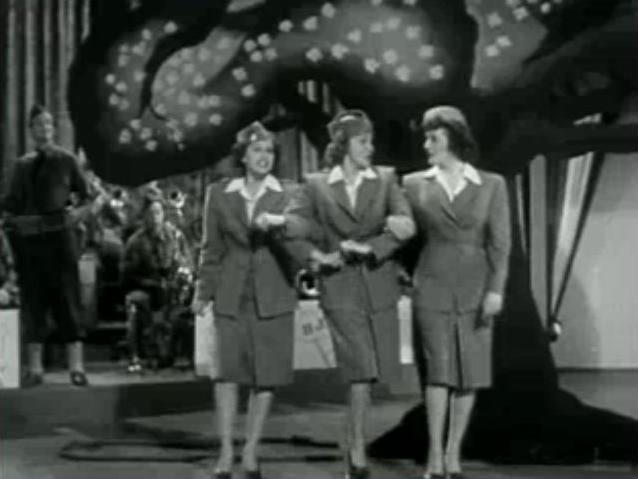
The Andrews Sisters singing "Don't Sit Under the Apple Tree" in Private Buckaroo.

"Don't Sit Under the Apple Tree (with Anyone Else but Me)" is a popular song that was made famous by Glenn Miller and by the Andrews Sisters during World War II. Its lyrics are the words of two young lovers who pledge their fidelity while one of them is away serving in the war.

The Glenn Miller recording on RCA Bluebird Records reached no. 2 on the Billboard pop singles chart in 1942.

Also sung by sailors and nurses in a beach scene in the John Wayne/Otto Preminger movie In Harm's Way. In June 2026, CBS News included the song in its list of the 250 essential American songs of the past 250 years.

== Background ==
Originally titled "Anywhere the Bluebird Goes", the melody was written by Sam H. Stept as an updated version of the nineteenth-century English folk song "Long, Long Ago". Lew Brown and Charles Tobias wrote the lyrics and the song debuted in the 1939 Broadway musical Yokel Boy. After the United States entered the war in December 1941, Brown and Tobias modified the lyrics to their current form, with the chorus ending with "...till I come marching home".

"Don't Sit Under the Apple Tree" remained in Your Hit Parade's first place from October 1942 through January 1943. It was the longest period for a war song to hold first place.

On February 18, 1942, Glenn Miller and his Orchestra recorded the song with vocals by Tex Beneke, Marion Hutton, and The Modernaires. The 78 single was released on RCA Bluebird Records on March 6, peaking at no. 2 on Billboard. This record, the B side to "The Lamplighter's Serenade", spent thirteen weeks on the Billboard charts and was ranked as the nation's twelfth best-selling recording of the year.

In May the song was featured in the film Private Buckaroo as a performance by the Andrews Sisters with the Harry James orchestra and featuring a tap dancing routine by The Jivin' Jacks and Jills. This scene is often considered one of the most memorable of the film.

The Andrews Sisters then released the song on Decca Records as a 78 single that month, peaking at no. 16 on Billboard. (In a 1971 interview, Patty Andrews reported that this was their most requested song.)

Many other artists released records of the song that year, including Kay Kyser. With the Miller, Andrews, and Kyser records all being popular on the radio, "Don't Sit Under the Apple Tree" became one of the few songs in history to have three different versions on the radio hit parade at the same time. The Andrews version was inducted into the Grammy Hall of Fame in 2016.

== Other versions ==
- Bing Crosby included the song in a medley on his album On the Happy Side (1962).
- In 2012, Broadway icon Carol Channing released a duet of the song with country singer T. Graham Brown on her album True To The Red, White, and Blue.
- Glen Gray
- Kay Kyser
- The King Sisters
- Bob Crosby
- Barry Wood
- Dick Rogers
- Frankie Masters
- Jimmy Joy
- Barry Manilow, 1994 Singin' with the Big Bands album

== Parodies ==
- In 1943, Harold Adamson and Jimmy McHugh wrote "They Just Chopped Down the Old Apple Tree" for the film Around the World as a humorous parody of this song, which was recorded by The Dinning Sisters.
- Frank Loesser's and Arthur Schwartz's "They're Either Too Young or Too Old" from Thank Your Lucky Stars, also references the song when a woman tells her lover that she "can't sit under the apple tree with anyone else but me" because all of the other men her age are also fighting in the war.
