= The Holy Terror (1937 film) =

1937 film by James Tinling

- Film poster
- Directed by: James Tinling
- Written by: John Patrick; Lou Breslow
- Produced by: Sol M. Wurtzel
- Starring: Jane Withers; Tony Martin; Leah Ray; Joe E. Lewis; El Brendel; John Eldredge
- Cinematography: Daniel B. Clark
- Edited by: Nick DeMaggio
- Music by: Gene Rose
- Production company: 20th Century Fox
- Distributed by: 20th Century Fox
- Release date: February 5, 1937
- Running time: 80 minutes
- Country: United States
- Language: English

for others with the same name, see The Holy Terror (disambiguation)

The Holy Terror is a 1937 American comedy drama film directed by James Tinling as a vehicle for child star Jane Withers. The film follows the comic adventures of 11-year-old Withers as she causes mild havoc and catches spies on her father's naval base.

== Plot ==
After U.S. Navy Commander Captain J. J. Otis (Andrew Tombes) complains to Lieutenant Commander Wallace (John Eldredge) about his daughter Cork (Jane Withers), the darling of the enlisted men but getting under foot. H. D. Phelps (Raymond Brown) of the House Appropriations Committee is investigating a request for an increase in appropriations, Corky flies a miniature aircraft with her two pals, Axel Svenson (El Brendel) and Pelican Beek (Joe E. Lewis) but the aircraft flies into Otis' window disrupting the meeting with Phelps. Corky gets one more chance with seaman Dan Walker (Tony Martin) looking after her. Dan's girl friend, Marjorie Dean (Leah Ray), works at the Golden Anchor cafe where Danny sees Chief Petty Officer Carson (Fred Kohler Jr.) flirting with her. Corky sees the shore patrol coming, and makes out their fight is just an act.

Two sinister figures, Redman (Gavin Muir) and Maria Blair (Gloria Roy), want to buy the cafe to watch the hangar where a secret aircraft is being built. Marjorie refuses to sell the cafe but a worry about being declared off-limits, may force her hand. Corky and Pelican get into trouble, Redman starts a riot and the cafe is declared out of bounds for sailors. The two spies break into the cafe.

Next morning, Phelps is there for an exhibition flight, but Corky is sure there are spies about. She enters the radio room and commands all the flyers to parachute and land at the Golden Anchor where they capture the spies. Some of the flyers end up in hospital where Corky's new miniature aircraft, which creates havoc as it flies through the recovery room.

== Cast ==
- Jane Withers as "Corky" Wallace
- Tony Martin as Danny Walker
- Leah Ray as Marjorie Dean
- El Brendel as "Bugs" Svenson
- Joe E. Lewis as Pelican Beek
- Joan Davis as Lili
- Andrew Tombes as Commander Otis
- Fred Kohler Jr. as Carson
- Victor Adams as Flandro
- Raymond Brown as Phelps
- Gloria Roy as Maria Blair
- Gavin Muir as Redman
- John Eldredge as Lt. Comdr. Wallace

== Production ==
Principal photography on The Holy Terror took place from late October to late November 1936. The title of the film was taken from a play by Winchell Smith and George Abbott, owned by 20th Century Fox, which was the basis of the 1927 Fox film Hills of Peril.

== Reception ==
The Holy Terror had its premiere in Brooklyn, New York on January 22, 1937. Aviation film historian James Farmer in Celluloid Wings: The Impact of Movies on Aviation (1984) considered The Holy Terror, "a minor piece of sentiment and song built around the able talents of Miss Withers as the resident under-age trouble-maker with a passion for flying."
