= An Old-Fashioned Girl (film) =

1949 American film

- Directed by: Arthur Dreifuss
- Screenplay by: Arthur Dreifuss
- Based on: An Old-Fashioned Girl by Louisa May Alcott
- Produced by: Arthur Dreifuss
- Starring: Gloria Jean; Jimmy Lydon; John Hubbard; Frances Rafferty
- Cinematography: Philip Tannura
- Edited by: Arthur A. Brooks
- Production company: Equity-Vinson Productions
- Distributed by: Eagle-Lion Films
- Release date: January 19, 1949
- Running time: 82 minutes
- Country: United States
- Language: English

An Old-Fashioned Girl is a 1949 American musical comedy film based on the novel of the same name by Louisa May Alcott, directed by Arthur Dreifuss and starring Gloria Jean.

Jean had just made two films for Dreifuss at Columbia, then signed to do two more for the director. It was made by Vinson Productions for Eagle-Lion.

Filming started 20 September 1948.

== Cast ==
- Gloria Jean as Polly Milton
- Jimmy Lydon as Tom Shaw
- John Hubbard as Mr. Sydney
- Frances Rafferty as Frances Shaw
- Mary Eleanor Donahue as Maud Shaw
- Irene Ryan as Mrs. Shaw
- Douglas Wood as Mr. Shaw
- Barbara Brier as Trix Parker
- Claire Whitney as Miss Mills
- Rosemary LaPlanche as Emma Davenport
- Quenna Norla as Miss Perkins
- Shirley Mills as Belle
- Saundra Berkova as Irma
- Milton Kibbee as Farmer Brown
