= Manhattan Angel =

1949 film by Arthur Dreifuss

- Directed by: Arthur Dreifuss
- Screenplay by: Albert Derr
- Story by: George H. Plympton (original story); Albert Deer (original story)
- Produced by: Sam Katzman
- Starring: Gloria Jean; Patricia Barry; Thurston Hall
- Cinematography: Ira H. Morgan
- Edited by: Richard Fantl
- Color process: Black and white
- Production company: Sam Katzman Productions
- Distributed by: Columbia Pictures
- Release date: March 17, 1949
- Running time: 68 minutes
- Country: United States
- Language: English

Manhattan Angel is a 1949 American comedy musical film directed by Arthur Dreifuss and starring Gloria Jean, Patricia Barry and Thurston Hall.

It was originally called Sweetheart of the Blues. It was made after I Surrender Dear.

== Plot ==
Gloria Cole and Eddie Swenson are working to keep an old house, now being used as a youth center, from being razed to make room for a new skyscraper in Manhattan. Gloria enters a friend in a beauty contest with a $25,000 first prize and, after some iffy-maneuvering, her friend wins the contest and the money goes to preserving the youth center.

== Cast ==
- Gloria Jean as Gloria Cole
- Ross Ford as Eddie Swenson
- Patricia Barry as Maggie Graham (as Patricia White)
- Thurston Hall as Everett H. Burton
- Alice Tyrrell as Queenie Walters
- Benny Baker as Aloysius Duff
- Russell Hicks as J.C. Rayland
- Fay Baker as Vi Langdon
- Jimmy Lloyd as Elmer
- Toni Harper as Toni
- The Sweetheart Choristers as Singers

== See also ==
- List of American films of 1949
