= A Little Bit of Heaven (1940 film) =

- Film poster
- Directed by: Andrew Marton
- Screenplay by: Daniel Taradash; Gertrude Purcell
- Story by: Grover Jones
- Produced by: Joe Pasternak
- Starring: Gloria Jean
- Cinematography: John F. Seitz
- Edited by: Lásló Benedek
- Production company: Universal Pictures
- Distributed by: Universal Pictures
- Release date: October 11, 1940
- Running time: 87 minutes
- Country: United States
- Language: English

A Little Bit of Heaven is a 1940 musical film starring teenage soprano singer Gloria Jean.

The film's title comes from a traditional Irish song that Gloria Jean sings at a family gathering. Her 2005 biography is similarly titled: Gloria Jean: A Little Bit of Heaven. The film is an unofficial sequel to 1939's The Under-Pup, featuring several cast members from that film, but as different characters. The group of girls in The Under-Pup was called "The Penguins", and Gloria Jean sings the group's song early in this film.

== Plot ==
Midge Loring is a young member of a large Irish working-class family who becomes a singing sensation on a local radio station. The family's new-found wealth causes some discord until the family realizes that their closeness is what they value the most.

== Cast ==
- Gloria Jean as Midge Loring
- Robert Stack as Bob Terry
- Hugh Herbert as Pop Loring
- C. Aubrey Smith as Grandpa
- Stuart Erwin as Cotton
- Nan Grey as Janet Loring
- Eugene Pallette as Herrington
- Billy Gilbert as Tony
- Kenneth Brown as Tony's son
- Billy Lenhart as Tony's son
- Nana Bryant as Mom Loring
- Tommy Bond as Jerry
- Charles Previn as Radio Conductor
- Kitty O'Neil as Mrs. Mitchell
- Helen Brown as Herrington's secretary

== Production ==
In January 1940, Universal announced that Gloria Jean's third movie would be Our City, the tale of two sisters, based on a story by Grover Jones. Loretta Young was to play the sister and the cast would include Robert Cummings, Eugene Pallette, Lewis Howard and Billy Gilbert.

By May the title had been changed to Straight from the Heart and Young was replaced by Nan Grey. Then it became A Little Bit of Heaven and Cummings was replaced by Robert Stack. Filming began in June.
