= I Surrender Dear (1948 film) =

1948 film by Arthur Dreifuss

- Directed by: Arthur Dreifuss
- Produced by: Sam Katzman
- Starring: Gloria Jean
- Cinematography: Vincent J. Farrar
- Edited by: Richard Fantl
- Production company: Columbia Pictures
- Distributed by: Columbia Pictures
- Release date: October 7, 1948
- Running time: 67 minutes
- Country: USA
- Language: English
- Budget: $140,000

I Surrender Dear is a 1948 American musical film directed by Arthur Dreifuss and starring Gloria Jean. It was the first of two films the singer made for producer Sam Katzman.

== Plot ==
Radio stations across America are signing big-name disc jockeys like Dave Garroway, Jack Eigen, and Peter Potter to entertain listeners with running chatter while playing the latest pop-music records. Los Angeles radio station KXIW has a problem: its own record spinner Russ Nelson plays sedate classical music. Meanwhile, Nelson's daughter Patty auditions for a job as a singer, under the alias "Patty Hart." She is hired by bandleader Al Tyler and goes on tour with the orchestra. The KXIW management signs Tyler as a disc jockey, replacing Nelson. Patty leaves Tyler abruptly and joins her father on the air as a vocalist. The "Patty and Russ" program catches on during Nelson's last days at the station, so much so that the sponsors want to forget Tyler and keep Patty and Russ. Tyler is angered by Patty's sudden defection and the station's change of heart, but Tyler's assistant Tommy Tompkins pulls some strings behind the scenes to iron out the difficulties. The Tyler orchestra goes on the air as scheduled, with Patty singing and Russ announcing.

== Cast ==
- Gloria Jean as Patty Nelson, also known as Patty Hart
- David Street as Al Tyler
- Don McGuire as Tommy Tompkins
- Alice Tyrrell as Trudy Clements
- Robert Emmett Keane as Russ Nelson
- Regina Wallace as Mrs. Nelson
- Douglas Wood as R. H. Collins
- Byron Foulger as George Rogers
- The Novelites as nightclub trio
- Jack Eigen as himself
- Dave Garroway as himself
- Peter Potter as himself

== Production ==
I Surrender Dear was originally the title of what became Glamour Girl (1948). The title was reused here. Producer Sam Katzman budgeted the film at $140,000.

== Reception ==
The film turned out nicely, and no one was more surprised than the star, Gloria Jean: "The biggest audience reaction, more so than anything I can ever remember — laugh if you like — was I Surrender Dear... People were all enthusiastic, everybody went crazy. Then when they saw me, they cheered and applauded... They never had that reaction with my other movies. I Surrender Dear gave me a new lease on life." Katzman reused the I Surrender Dear formula, repeating many of the script situations and some of the staging, for his very successful Columbia musical Rock Around the Clock (1956).

I Surrender Dear was meant to be followed by a film called Sweetheart of the Blues, which became Manhattan Angel. When producer Katzman's Superman became a blockbuster in 1948, Columbia insisted that Katzman should make more action pictures, so Columbia's Gloria Jean series stopped after only two films. Director Arthur Dreifuss and Gloria Jean continued the musical series for other studios.
