= Laffing Time =

1959 film by Alf Goulding

Laffing Time is a 1959 American film starring Gloria Jean and El Brendel and directed by Alf Goulding. The film's producer, Edward Finney, also took the leading comic role, under the pseudonym "Eddie Finn."

== Plot ==
Well-meaning but clumsy husband Musty Suffer lives with his wife Sally and his tough-talking mother-in-law. His Swedish-dialect pal is next-door neighbor Efrem Blobbs. Musty and Blobbs plan an elaborate birthday party for Musty's daughters Betsy and Netsy. When the tax collector takes Musty's handy money, Musty and Blobbs stage the party themselves. Still in need of cash, Musty and his family hire on as servants for a society matron, whose important dinner party goes from bad to worse.

== History ==
In 1959 producer Finney had seen a newspaper report that former singing star Gloria Jean was now working as a hostess, in a restaurant with Hollywood clientele. Finney had always been a Gloria Jean fan, and he sponsored her return to the screen. The finished film, edited by Finney himself, was retitled The Madcaps for release in 1964. Finney recut it and shot additional scenes for a new children's-matinee version, Tobo the Happy Clown (1966).
