= Air Strike (1955 film) =

1955 film

- Theatrical film poster
- Directed by: Cy Roth
- Written by: Cy Roth (screenplay)
- Based on: story by Cy Roth
- Produced by: Cy Roth
- Starring: Richard Denning; Gloria Jean; Don Haggerty
- Narrated by: Richard Denning
- Cinematography: Alan Stensvold
- Edited by: Duncan Mansfield
- Music by: André Brummer
- Production company: Cy Roth Productions Inc.
- Distributed by: Lippert-Universal
- Release date: May 6, 1955
- Running time: 67 minutes
- Country: United States
- Language: English

Air Strike is a 1955 American drama film written, directed and produced by Cy Roth and starring Richard Denning, Gloria Jean and Don Haggerty; the supporting cast features former child star Billy Halop. The plot involves pilots training at a United States Navy squadron preparing for the Korean War. The film features the original song, "Each Time You Leave Me" by composers Sylvia Ostrow and André Brummer.

== Plot ==
U.S. Navy Commander Stanley Blair, is in charge of a fighter-bomber squadron during the Korean War based on the USS Essex aircraft carrier. While training in the Atlantic Ocean, Blair's second-in-command, Lieutenant Dick Huggins demands Ensign James Delaney be transferred because he has exhibited a "lone wolf" attitude and an aggressive flying style. Blair intercedes explaining to the younger man that teamwork in the squadron is important.

Huggins also is facing family pressure as his wife, Marg is pressuring him to take a shore assignment. Other men in the squadron are also facing difficult decisions: Lieutenant Anthony Perini states that he is only serving his term and then will return to law school, while Lieutenant Hal Alexander wonders if he "has the stuff" to become a career Navy man like his father, who received the Navy Cross during World War II. Lieutenant Smith reveals that Blair also received the Navy Cross in the war, during a fight near the Mariana Islands, where he bombed an enemy cruiser.

While on maneuvers, after Huggins disputes Delaney's claim that he has spotted an unidentified submarine, the conflict between the two results in Blair offering Huggins a transfer out of the squadron. On a training flight, when the squadron runs into dense fog, each pilot has to try to reach the carrier before running out of fuel. With his instruments out and fuel running low, Huggins gets lost. Delaney runs out of fuel and crash-lands, but is rescued. When he finds that Huggins is still in the air, he volunteers to lead Huggins to safety. When both are safely back on the aircraft carrier, they reconcile and the squadron is praised for coming out of a difficult situation with skill and bravery.

== Cast ==
- Richard Denning as Cmdr. Stanley Blair
- Gloria Jean as Marg Huggins
- Don Haggerty as Lt. Richard Huggins
- William Hudson as Lt. John Smith (credited as Bill Hudson)
- Alan Wells as Anthony Perini
- John Kirby as David Loring
- Billy Halop as Lt. Cmdr. Orville Swanson (credited as William Halop)
- James Courtney as Ensign James Delaney
- Stanley Clements as G.H. Alexander

== Production ==
Air Strike relied heavily on stock footage, noting before this film's opening credits, a foreword reads: "With grateful appreciation for the cooperation of the Department of the Navy and the Department of Defense." At the film's end, the following dedication appears: "The mighty air arm of the United States Navy with its control of the seas is a great part of this nation's security. Aggression can be stopped and peace maintained with a strong Navy. This story is dedicated to the men at sea with wings." In a news item appearing in the November 1953 issue of The Hollywood Reporter, producer Cy Roth had "obtained complete financial backing from San Francisco interests for his Coyt Productions schedule." Air Strike would become the first of the films produced by Roth.

This movie underwent many changes at the request of the Department of Defense. For example, the lead characters were a young Jewish flyer and a young black flyer who are constantly being subjected to anti-Semitism and racism on the ship. The military said, "No, we don't want to show any kind of racism or anti-Semitism in this picture, you've got to change that." They also said, "We don't want a World War II-era picture, we want a movie set in the modern jet age." And Roth went nuts. He called his congressman, he wrote a letter to President Eisenhower — and the day after the White House got his letter of complaint, they sicced the FBI on him to see whether he was a Communist or not. Well, he finally caved in; he made the picture the way they wanted. So it was no blacks, no Jews, no propellers. If you look at this film, it's so bad, it looks like a home movie shot on an aircraft carrier. So this film was completely changed.

— David Robb, in Jeff Fleischer, Mother Jones, Operation Hollywood

=== Aircraft used ===
As noted in the onscreen film credits of Air Strike and in The Hollywood Reporter, sequences were filmed aboard the USS Essex (CVA-9) aircraft carrier, stationed in San Diego. The onscreen cast credit for the military extras reads: "The officers and men of the U.S.S. Essex (CVA 9); The "Fighting Falcons" of VF 142 Cougar Squadron." Additional sequences were shot at the Samuel Goldwyn Studios in 1954. The aircraft that appeared in Air Strike are:

- Curtiss SB2C Helldiver
- Douglas AD Skyraider
- Douglas SBD Dauntless
- Grumman F9F Cougar
- McDonnell F2H Banshee
- McDonnell FH-1 Phantom
- Mikoyan-Gurevich MiG-15
- Mitsubishi A6M Zero
- North American FJ-3 Fury
- Sikorsky HO3S-1
- Vought F7U Cutlass

== Reception ==
Air Strike was primarily a B film, and although aerial scenes were notable, fell short in other aspects. In a later appraisal, film historian Michael Paris in From the Wright Brothers to Top Gun: Aviation, Nationalism, and Popular Cinema (1995) noted that the film was a "studio-based" approach to the Korean War era. Film historians Jack Hardwick and Ed Schnepf dismissed the film as "propaganda", claiming that "the film credits should read: 'Made free by U.S. Navy'." Aviation film historian Christian Santoir considered Air Strike as a historical document with "rare" film footage of U.S.Navy postwar jet aircraft.
