= Monte Amundsen =

American actress (1930–2011)

- Born: January 15, 1930
- Died: December 24, 2011 (aged 81); Tampa, Florida, U.S.
- Occupations: Singer, entertainer
- Spouse: Tommy Rall (m. 1959, divorced) Giorgio Tozzi (m. 1967; died 2011)
- Children: 2

Monte Amundsen (January 15, 1930 – December 24, 2011) was an American opera and musical singer who appeared on Broadway in Marc Blitzstein's musical Juno in 1959, which starred Shirley Booth.

== Biography ==
Composer Marc Blitzstein was reportedly so delighted with Amundsen that he expanded her role in Juno to include three major songs: I Wish It So, For Love, and My True Heart, as well as a duet with Shirley Booth, The Bird Upon The Tree. The show was not a success, but Amundsen's well-received performance is preserved on the original cast recording. In 1964 she appeared in another ill-fated musical, Cafe Crown, which ran for 30 performances in previews before closing after just three performances after its official opening.

Amundsen also made many appearances at The Muny in St. Louis, including Rosabella in The Most Happy Fella (1969); Marie Esterhazy in Blossom Time (1966); Gretel in Hansel & Gretel (1966); Barbara in Milk and Honey (1964); Anna Belle in Robin Hood (1961); Resi in The Great Waltz (1961) and Gretchen in The Red Mill (1960). In 1958 she made her debut at the New York City Opera as Adele in Die Fledermaus. She also sang several roles with the Pittsburgh Civic Light Opera during the 1950s and 1960s.

== Personal life ==
She was briefly married to dancer Tommy Rall and later married opera star Giorgio Tozzi in 1967, with whom she had two children, Jennifer and Eric. She was widowed seven months before her own death.

== Sources ==
- Thomas S. Hischak, The Oxford companion to the American musical: theatre, film, and television, Oxford University Press US, 2008; ISBN 0-19-533533-3
- Arleen Jackson, "Monte Amundsen Favors Theater-in-the-round", Schenectady Gazette, July 31, 1959
- Time Magazine, The Theater: New Musical on Broadway, March 23, 1959
