= Private Buckaroo =

1942 film by Edward F. Cline

- Film poster
- Directed by: Edward F. Cline
- Screenplay by: Edmond Kelso; Edward James
- Story by: Paul Girard
- Produced by: Ken Goldsmith
- Starring: Harry James; Patty Andrews; Maxene Andrews
- Cinematography: Elwood Bredell
- Edited by: Milton Carruth
- Color process: black and white
- Production company: Universal Pictures
- Distributed by: Universal Pictures
- Release dates: May 28, 1942 (Los Angeles); June 12, 1942 (United States)
- Running time: 68 minutes
- Country: United States
- Language: English

Private Buckaroo is a 1942 American comedy-musical film directed by Edward F. Cline and produced by Universal Pictures. The film stars The Andrews Sisters, Dick Foran, Harry James, Shemp Howard, Joe E. Lewis, and Jennifer Holt. Released during World War II, the film combines military comedy with musical performances by popular entertainers of the period, including The Andrews Sisters and Harry James and His Music Makers. The story follows entertainer Lon Prentice, who enlists in the United States Army and struggles to adapt to military life during basic training, with the Andrews Sisters attending USO dances.

The film premiered in Los Angeles on May 28, 1942.

== Plot ==
Entertainer Lon Prentice initially is keen to enlist in the US Army but is prevented from this due to his having one flat foot. After having the foot treated, he is accepted for enlistment. Soon after basic training begins, Private Prentice informs his commanding officer that he finds most military training useless, unnecessary and beneath him. His commander orders all the men that Private Prentice is exempt from doing things he doesn't want to do, which turns the entire camp against him.

== Cast ==
- The Andrews Sisters (Maxene Andrews, Patty Andrews and LaVerne Andrews)
- Dick Foran as Lon Prentice
- Joe E. Lewis as Lancelot Pringle McBiff
- Jennifer Holt as Joyce Mason
- Shemp Howard as First Sgt. 'Muggsy' Shavel
- Richard Davies as Lt. Howard Mason
- Mary Wickes as Bonnie-Belle Schlopkiss
- Ernest Truex as Col. Elias Weatherford
- Donald O'Connor as Donny
- Peggy Ryan as Peggy
- Huntz Hall as Cpl. Anemic
- Susan Levine as Tagalong
- Jivin' Jacks and Jills as Themselves
- Harry James and His Music Makers as Themselves

== Production ==
Private Buckaroo was one of several wartime musicals produced by Universal Pictures featuring The Andrews Sisters. The film was released in 1942, shortly after the United States entered World War II, and reflected Hollywood's efforts to support military morale through entertainment-oriented service comedies.

== Soundtrack ==
- Dick Foran – "Private Buckaroo" (written by Charles Newman and Allie Wrubel)
- The Andrews Sisters – "Three Little Sisters" (written by Irving Taylor and Vic Mizzy)
- Dick Foran – "I'm in the Army Now"
- The Andrews Sisters – "Six Jerks in a Jeep" (written by Sid Robin)
- The Andrews Sisters – "Don't Sit Under the Apple Tree" (written by Sam H. Stept and Charles Tobias)
- The Andrews Sisters – "James Session" danced by Donald O'Connor, Peggy Ryan and The Jivin' Jacks and Jills
- The Andrews Sisters – "Steppin' Out Tonight", based on the song "That's The Moon, My Son" (written by Art Kassel and Sammy Gallop)
- Dick Foran and Helen Forrest – "Nobody Knows the Trouble I've Seen"
- Harry James and His Music Makers – "Concerto for Trumpet"
- The Andrews Sisters – "Johnny Get Your Gun Again" (written by Don Raye and Gene de Paul)
- Dick Foran and The Andrews Sisters – "We've Got a Job to Do" (written by Vickie Knight)
- Joe E. Lewis – "I Love the South"
- Helen Forrest with Harry James and His Music Makers – "You Made Me Love You" (written by Joseph McCarthy and James V. Monaco)

== See also ==
- Public domain film
- List of American films of 1942
- List of films in the public domain in the United States
