= Juno (musical) =

- Original Cast Recording
- Music: Marc Blitzstein
- Lyrics: Marc Blitzstein
- Book: Joseph Stein
- Basis: Play by Seán O'Casey; Juno and the Paycock
- Productions: 1959 Broadway; 1992 Off-Broadway

Juno is a musical with music and lyrics by Marc Blitzstein and book by Joseph Stein, based closely on the 1924 play Juno and the Paycock by Seán O'Casey. The story centers on the disintegration of an Irish family in Dublin in the early 1920s, during the Irish War of Independence. Juno is a hardworking matriarch who strives to hold her family together in the face of war, betrayal, and her worthless husband's drinking.

The original production opened on Broadway in 1959 and closed after only 16 performances. Its somber tone did not please the critics, who were disappointed that its stars, particularly Shirley Booth, did not have an opportunity to play comedy. The score and original cast album have found some praise. Several revivals have been staged, but none has met with great success.

== Background ==
Despite light moments, the musical, even more than the satiric play, is essentially a tragedy. Modern scholars of musical theatre consider Blitzstein and Stein's musicalization of the source material to be strong, but initial reviews of the piece were mostly negative, mainly because critics and audiences felt that the story was too dark for a musical. The production closed after only 16 performances. According to Robert Viagas, writing in Playbill, "The consensus is that the score may have been ahead of its time, especially harmonically."

== Productions ==
Juno premiered on Broadway at the Winter Garden Theatre on March 9, 1959. The original director was originally to have been Tony Richardson, who dropped out of the production during the early stages. Vincent J. Donehue replaced him, but the rest of the creative team were not satisfied with his work. He was then replaced by José Ferrer. Orchestrations were by Blitzstein, with support from Robert Russell Bennett and Hershy Kay. The show was conducted by Robert Emmett Dolan and choreographed by Agnes de Mille. The production starred Shirley Booth (as Juno Boyle), Melvyn Douglas (as Captain Boyle), Jack MacGowran (as Joxer), and Tommy Rall (as Johnny Boyle), with a cast that included Monte Amundsen, Nancy Andrews, Jean Stapleton, and Sada Thompson. It closed on March 21, after 16 performances.

Revivals of Juno have since been attempted several times with little success, with revisions and new material by Richard Maltby Jr. and severely reduced orchestrations. Juno was presented at the Williamstown Theatre Festival in 1974, in a "New Adaptation by Richard Maltby Jr. & Geraldine Fitzgerald and with Additional Lyrics by Richard Maltby Jr." and starred Fitzgerald as the title character and Milo O'Shea as Captain Jack Boyle.

The musical was produced Off-Broadway by the Vineyard Theatre in 1992, directed by Lonny Price, and featuring Anita Gillette and Malcolm Gets. The New York Times reviewer wrote: "Despite alterations, the musical has not markedly improved in its newly revised version. ... The savage ironies of that scene are not evoked in other aspects of the musical, which focuses on the latent sentimentality within the family relationships and the comic interplay among the characters. On the most immediate level, Mr. Blitzstein's music wavers in its claim to an Irish lilt. The lyrics often resort to banalities and occasionally to doggerel. Repeatedly, the show overlooks the opportunity to take off from the playwright's words. The score is unworthy of both O'Casey and Mr. Blitzstein, the composer of The Cradle Will Rock and Regina".

New York City Center's Encores! presented a semi-staged concert production of Juno in March 2008 directed by Garry Hynes, starring Victoria Clark and John Schuck using the original orchestrations. Critical response was more favorable after nearly fifty years, with praise for the score and performances. Ben Brantley, in his review for The New York Times, wrote that the score "translates Irish folk vernacular into a style that is part Broadway perkiness, part 20th-century-opera anxiety. And under the direction of Eric Stern, the Encores! orchestra fully evokes this intriguing ambivalence. Even the most buoyant love songs and ensemble numbers are inflected with an underlying grimness, as if hope could never be expected to fly free in the rotting tenements of Dublin. It feels right that the show’s prettiest number, a madrigal, is about a bird trapped in its nest. ... Ms. Clarks's Juno is the other principal reason to see this production."

== Musical numbers ==
Act I

- We're Alive – Ensemble
- I Wish It So – Mary Boyle
- Song of the Ma – Juno Boyle
- We Can Be Proud – Foley, Sullivan, Michael Brady and Paddy Coyne
- Daarlin' Man – "Captain" Jack Boyle, "Joxer" Daly and Ensemble
- One Kind Word – Jerry Devine
- Old Sayin's – Juno Boyle and "Captain" Jack Boyle
- What Is The Stars – "Captain" Jack Boyle and "Joxer" Daly
- Old Sayin's (Reprise) – Juno Boyle and "Captain" Jack Boyle
- You Poor Thing – Mrs. Madigan, Mrs. Brady, Mrs. Coyne and Miss Quinn
- Dublin Night – Johnny Boyle, Molly and Ensemble
- My True Heart – Mary Boyle and Charlie Bentham
- On a Day Like This – Juno Boyle, "Captain" Jack Boyle and Ensemble

Act II

- Bird Upon the Tree – Juno Boyle and Mary Boyle
- Music in the House – "Captain" Jack Boyle and Ensemble
- The Liffy Waltz – Ensemble
- Hymn – I. R. A. Singer
- Johnny – Johnny Boyle and Molly
- You Poor Thing (Reprise) – Mrs. Madigan, Mrs. Brady, Mrs. Coyne and Miss Quinn
- For Love – Mary Boyle
- One Kind Word (Reprise) – Jerry Devine
- Where? – Juno Boyle

== Recordings ==
Blitzstein's score was preserved by Columbia Records, which released the original cast album in both monaural and stereo editions. The Fynsworth Alley label re-released the recording on compact disc in 2002. Steven Suskin, in his review in Playbill, noted: "Time and again in the score, I sense that Blitzstein is reminding himself to write Irish music – and that hampers his creativity. The score ranges from exceptional to mundane; the weaker portions make it very clear to us, today, that Juno simply couldn't have worked. There have been at least three major attempts at 'fixing' the show, in the same way that Bernstein's Candide was 'fixed'."
