= It Comes Up Love =

1943 film by Charles Lamont

- Directed by: Charles Lamont
- Written by: Dorothy Bennett; Charles Kenyon
- Starring: Gloria Jean
- Cinematography: George Robinson
- Music by: Frank Skinner
- Distributed by: Universal Pictures
- Release date: January 21, 1943 (New York)
- Running time: 61 minutes
- Country: United States
- Language: English

It Comes Up Love is a 1943 American black-and-white musical comedy starring Gloria Jean, Ian Hunter and Donald O'Connor. It is the only film starring Gloria Jean and O'Connor that does not also star Peggy Ryan, another of the talented teenagers under contract to Universal Studios.

== Cast ==
- Gloria Jean as Victoria Peabody
- Ian Hunter as Tom Peabody
- Donald O'Connor as Ricky Ives
- Frieda Inescort as Portia Winthrop
- Louise Allbritton as Edie Ives
- Mary Lou Harrington as Constance Peabody
- Raymond Roe as Carleton Winthrop
- Charles Coleman as Tilton
- Leon Belasco as Orchestra Leader
- Beatrice Roberts as Bernice
- unbilled players include Mantan Moreland

== Reception ==
In a contemporary review for The New York Times, critic Bosley Crowther called the film "a modest bit of comedy and romance" and wrote: "The humor is very obvious and the situation even more so; but Gloria sings three songs nicely ... and young Donald is a pleasant gosling ... In short, an acceptable picture for teen-age patrons on a double bill. But try to forget that title. It brings up nothing but unpleasant thoughts."
