= Gloria Jean =

American teen actress and singer (1926–2018)

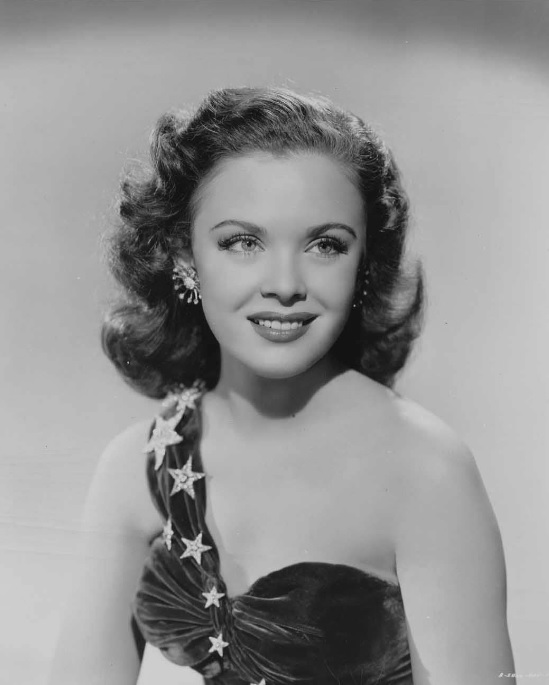
- Gloria Jean in 1947
- Born: Gloria Jean Schoonover; April 14, 1926; Buffalo, New York, U.S.
- Died: August 31, 2018 (aged 92); Mountain View, Hawaii, U.S.
- Resting place: Mountain View Community Cemetery, Hawaii, U.S.
- Occupations: Actress; singer
- Years active: 1929–1962
- Spouse: Franco Cellini (m. 1962; div. 1966)
- Children: 1

Gloria Jean (born Gloria Jean Schoonover; April 14, 1926 – August 31, 2018) was an American actress and singer who starred in 26 feature films from 1939 to 1959 and made numerous radio, television, stage and nightclub appearances. She may be best remembered for her appearance with W. C. Fields in the film Never Give a Sucker an Even Break (1941).

== Early years ==
Gloria Jean was born Gloria Jean Schoonover in Buffalo, New York, the daughter of Ferman and Eleanor Schoonover; her ancestry was Pennsylvania Dutch. She had three sisters: Sally, Lois and Bonnie. The family was involved in her career, with Lois serving as a stand-in for Gloria Jean and their father managing her career. Gloria Jean was three years old when she first sang on radio under the name of Baby Skylark.

== Singing ==
The family moved to Scranton, Pennsylvania, where Gloria Jean sang with Paul Whiteman's orchestra on radio broadcasts. When she was 12, she became the youngest member of an American opera troupe when she joined a small New York opera company,

== Film ==
=== Universal ===
In 1938, Gloria Jean was being trained as a coloratura soprano when her voice teacher Leah Russel took her to an audition held by Universal Pictures producer Joe Pasternak, who had guided Deanna Durbin to stardom. Pasternak wanted a younger singer for the same kind of musical in which Durbin had starred. He held auditions for a film called The Under-Pup. and Gloria Jean was selected for the role. She later recalled: "There were hundreds of beautiful little girls there. I had been grabbed out of the sandbox, and I didn't look so nice. I had pigtails and my teeth were a little crooked. But that's what Joe liked."

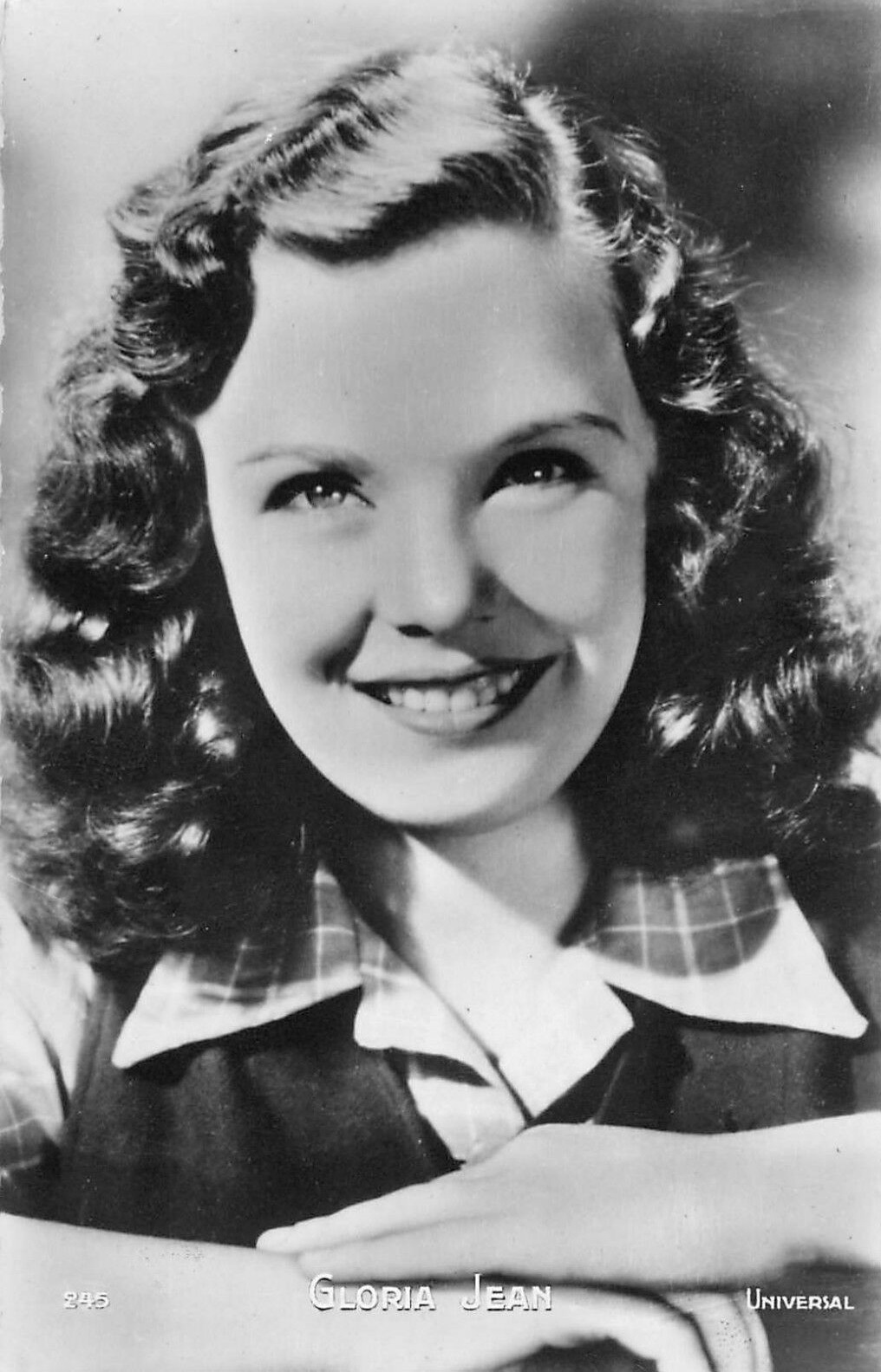
Gloria Jean in 1940

Gloria Jean starred in The Under-Pup with Robert Cummings and Nan Grey and the film enjoyed an extended run in many theaters. Universal's publicity department initially claimed that she was 11 years old rather than 13. Her actual age was not well known for many decades.

She next costarred with Bing Crosby in If I Had My Way (1940), directed by David Butler, and in the well-received A Little Bit of Heaven (1940), which reunited her with many from The Under-Pup cast.

In December 1940, Gloria Jean was sued by William Lustig, a Pennsylvania bandleader who had appeared with her during her local radio years and claimed to be her former agent.

Gloria Jean's fourth film role became perhaps her best-known when she costarred with W.C. Fields in Never Give a Sucker an Even Break (1941). She later recalled working with Fields: "He had a reputation, I know, for not liking children, but he was very kind and considerate to me. I used to wonder, though, why he didn't eat on the set. When we broke for a meal he'd say, 'Get that kid off to school.' Of course, I know now, it was because he wanted to drink." Fields was fond of Gloria Jean and her mother Eleanor, who visited him for daily dressing-room chats, and Fields invited both to his home.

=== Youth musicals ===
Universal recognized the need for musical entertainment during wartime, and Gloria Jean became one of the studio's most prolific performers. During the war years, she appeared in 14 feature films, mostly "hepcat" musicals geared to teenagers to introduce new young talent. She supported the Andrews Sisters in What's Cookin' (1942) and then appeared in Get Hep to Love (1942), directed by Charles Lamont, who directed her next film, When Johnny Comes Marching Home (1942). She received top billing along with Donald O'Connor in It Comes Up Love (1943).

For her first dramatic performance in 1942, Gloria Jean portrayed a blind girl in one of four vignettes for Julien Duvivier's Flesh and Fantasy (1943). Gloria Jean was relieved when the studio began to admit her real age, saying: "[This] proves I'm no child. Everyone will know that I'm grown-up then. Charles Boyer, the producer, tested 60 girls for the part of the blind girl in this sequence. When my name was suggested, everyone said, 'But Gloria Jean's such a child!' I made the test and was chosen." Although her performance was warmly received at the film's advance preview, Universal removed her half-hour sequence at the insistence of a prominent studio stockholder. Los Angeles Times columnist Edwin Schallert wrote: "For Gloria the fact that she did not appear in Flesh and Fantasy was a heartbreak, and she declares she's had a number of them even thus far in her experience. She also expects to have more. She's philosophical about that. 'But I've liked every bit of my experiences during those five years, even the heartbreaks,' she said. 'The Flesh and Fantasy was the worst, because the part I played in that really meant a lot to me. It was the first I'd ever done with real drama. But now they plan to develop that sequence into a full-length picture so that probably proves, as I've learned, that things generally work out for the best.'"

In the wake of Flesh and Fantasy, Universal tried to afford Gloria Jean a smooth transition from adolescent roles to leading-lady status, as she was outgrowing juvenile roles but not yet mature enough for adult leads. In December 1942, she was tested for the female lead in The Phantom of the Opera, but was thought to be too young for the role. She was then considered as the singing ingenue in the Abbott and Costello comedy It Ain't Hay (1943) but was believed to be too old for the role. Universal returned Gloria Jean to budget musicals when she costarred with O'Connor and Peggy Ryan in Mister Big (1943) and in Moonlight in Vermont (1943).

In January 1944, Universal announced plans to launch Gloria Jean as a more adult star, and she turned 18 in April. She costarred with Olsen and Johnson in the large-budget Ghost Catchers (1944), which featured singer-actor Kirby Grant. Gloria Jean worked so well with Grant that Universal teamed them for two more features in 1945: I'll Remember April and Easy to Look At.

When Gloria Jean's Universal contract expired at the end of 1944, her agent Eddie Sherman -- who also handled the studio's leading stars Abbott and Costello -- declined to renew it, citing the need for "a transition period to make the change from child to adult roles." As Universal had already promised exhibitors three films starring her for the 1945 season, she was rushed through three final productions: Easy to Look At, River Gang and Destiny, an expansion of Gloria Jean's 30-minute sequence from Flesh and Fantasy.

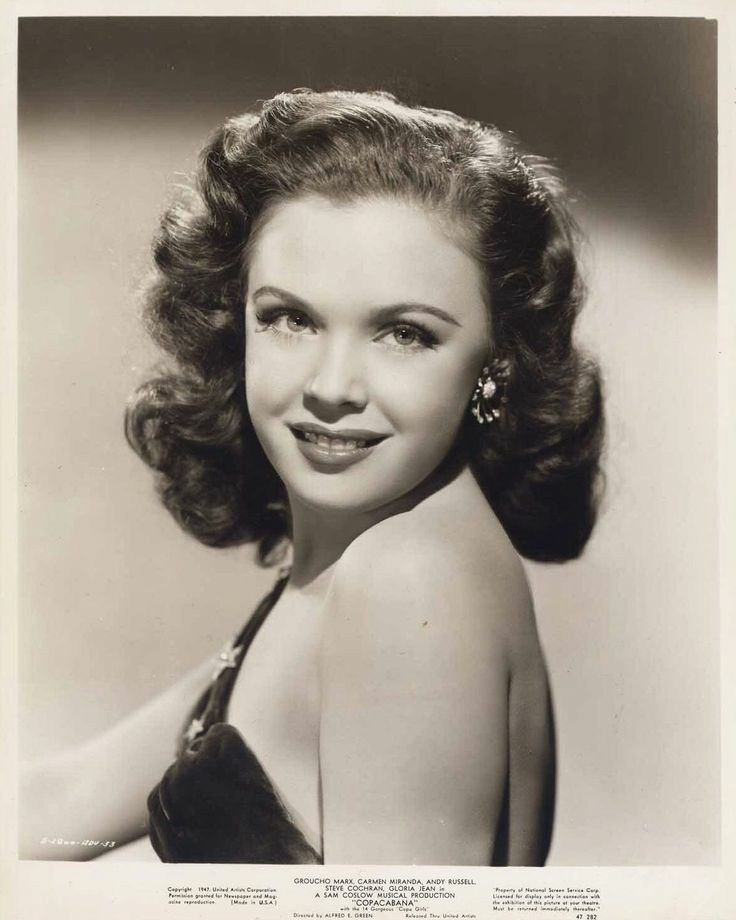
Gloria Jean in a publicity photo for Copacabana

=== Tours and aftermath ===
Gloria Jean didn't want to leave Universal, but her agent Sherman persuaded her that her future was uncertain there -- the company was undergoing a merger, and many of her colleagues were already leaving the studio. Gloria left the studio in December 1944. She then made personal appearances across America, arranged by Sherman, followed by a tour of Europe. In England, her rendition of "The Lord's Prayer" (and the lyric "forgive us our debts") was taken by some critics as a pointed comment about the American lend-lease policy. Gloria Jean later remarked: "It was all over the newspapers the next day, the story that I had come to London to insult Britons. I was devastated." The episode forced an abrupt end of the tour, and Gloria Jean returned to Hollywood.

Gloria Jean's family lawyer had vanished with her earnings and she found great difficulty in securing film roles. She later admitted: "It was a mistake for me to stay away from Hollywood that long. You can easily be forgotten."

She resumed her film career as a freelance performer appearing in United Artists, Columbia Pictures, and Allied Artists productions, including Copacabana (1947) with Groucho Marx. Four of her later films were directed by Arthur Dreifuss: I Surrender Dear (1948), Manhattan Angel (1949), An Old-Fashioned Girl (1949) and There's a Girl in My Heart (1949).

=== The 1950s ===
In 1951, Gloria Jean starred in six Snader Telescriptions, three-minute musicals syndicated for television. The episodes were later compiled into the 1955 television series Showtime. She appeared in other musical and dramatic television shows such as Hollywood Theatre Time, Rebound, Death Valley Days, Hallmark Hall of Fame, The Colgate Comedy Hour, Your Favorite Story, Annie Oakley and Lux Video Theatre. She continued to appear sporadically in low-budget features such as the lost Wonder Valley (1952), her first color film. Her next feature film was Air Strike (1955), a minor military drama.

After Air Strike, Gloria Jean was employed as a hostess at the Tahitian restaurant in Studio City, California, Patrons were surprised that a former star had resorted to restaurant work, resulting in sympathetic feature stories in the national press. Hollywood producer Edward Finney read one of these reports and hired Gloria Jean to star in the lightweight comedy Laffing Time (filmed in 1959, rereleased as The Madcaps in 1964). Jerry Lewis, who had also read the newspaper accounts, signed her for a singing role in his latest production and her final film, The Ladies Man (1961). However, Lewis removed almost all of her footage from the finished film, and she appears only as an extra with no dialogue.

Gloria Jean's final television appearances occurred in episodes of The Dick Powell Theatre, Lockup and Saints and Sinners.

== Personal life ==
Newspaper columnist Bob Thomas reported that Gloria Jean was engaged to a pilot who was killed in the Korean War. However, Gloria Jean denied the account, dismissing it as mistaken identification.

In 1962, Gloria Jean married Italian actor Franco Cellini, but the marriage was troubled by his frequent absences. She later told her biographers: "There were no fights, nothing like that. I just didn't know enough about him. A little series of events that happened ... the mysterious comings and goings, and the way he was." The couple had a son named Angelo, and divorced by 1966.

Gloria Jean encountered problems with taxes, saying: "Seems there had been a lot of mistakes in old income tax returns. So the Internal Revenue Service came along and seized all my assets. Everything ... I decided, unlike so many other child stars, that instead of just sitting around waiting for work in the acting business, I'd pick myself up and go out and get a job." In 1965, she became a receptionist at Redken Cosmetics, where she worked until 1993.

In 1986, she stated: "I'm very happy. I feel I had a wonderful past and I have a contented, happy present."

In December 1991, Gloria Jean was honored by the Young Artist Foundation with its Former Child Star "Lifetime Achievement" Award, recognizing her film achievements as a juvenile. She also attended nostalgia and autograph shows, meeting fans and displaying memorabilia.

== Final years ==
After her retirement from Redken, Gloria Jean lived in California with her sister Bonnie. After her sister died in 2007, Gloria Jean moved to Hawaii to live with her son Angelo and his family. Her son died in 2017, and very late in life, she suffered health problems, including two serious falls that slowed her mobility and a heart condition. She died of heart failure and pneumonia on August 31, 2018 in a hospital near her home in Mountain View, Hawaii at the age of 92.

Gloria Jean's authorized biography, Gloria Jean: A Little Bit of Heaven, was published in 2005. In her last years she recorded a few reminiscences for radio and YouTube videos.

== Filmography ==
Year	Film	Role	Notes
1939	The Under-Pup	Pip-Emma Binns	First film
1940	If I Had My Way	Patricia Johnson	
1940	A Little Bit of Heaven	Midge Loring	
1941	Never Give a Sucker an Even Break	W.C. Fields's niece, Gloria Jean	
1941	Jingle Belles	Song specialties	Short subject (reissued as Winter Serenade)
1942	What's Cookin'?	Sue Courtney	
1942	Get Hep to Love	Doris Stanley	Released outside the U.S. as She's My Lovely
1942	When Johnny Comes Marching Home	Marilyn Benton	
1943	It Comes Up Love	Victoria Peabody	Released outside the U.S. as A Date with an Angel
1943	Mister Big	Patricia Davis	
1943	Moonlight in Vermont	Gwen Harding	
1944	Ghost Catchers	Melinda Marshall	
1944	Pardon My Rhythm	Jinx Page	
1944	Reckless Age	Linda Wadsworth	
1944	Destiny	Jane Broderick	Includes sequence deleted from Flesh and Fantasy
1945	I'll Remember April	April Garfield	
1945	Easy to Look At	Judy Dawson	Last Universal film
1945	River Gang	Wendy	Release delayed by Universal; titled outside the U.S. as Fairy Tale Murder
1947	Copacabana	Anne Stuart	Sam Coslow production for United Artists
1948	I Surrender Dear	Patty Nelson, aka Patty Hart	Columbia
1948	Manhattan Angel	Gloria Cole	Columbia
1948	An Old Fashioned Girl	Polly Milton	Eagle-Lion
1949	There's a Girl in My Heart	Ruth Kroner	Allied Artists
1952	Wonder Valley		Viva Ruth Liles production; no known usable prints exist
1955	Air Strike	Marge Huggins	Robert L. Lippert production
1959	Laffing Time (reissued as The Madcaps)	Sally Suffer	Edward Finney production
1961	The Ladies' Man	Girl in boarding house	Paramount

== Radio appearances ==
Year	Program	Episode/source
1940	Lux Radio Theatre	The Under-Pup
