= Love Letters of a Star =

1936 film

- Theatrical release poster
- Directed by: Milton Carruth; Lewis R. Foster
- Screenplay by: Milton Carruth; Lewis R. Foster; James Mulhauser
- Based on: The Case of the Constant God by Rufus King
- Produced by: Charles R. Rogers
- Starring: Henry Hunter; Polly Rowles; C. Henry Gordon; Walter Coy; Hobart Cavanaugh; Mary Alice Rice; Ralph Forbes
- Cinematography: Milton Krasner
- Edited by: Frank Gross
- Production company: Universal Pictures
- Distributed by: Universal Pictures
- Release date: November 8, 1936
- Running time: 66 minutes
- Country: United States
- Language: English

Love Letters of a Star is a 1936 American mystery film directed by Milton Carruth and Lewis R. Foster and written by Milton Carruth, Lewis R. Foster, and James Mulhauser. The film stars Henry Hunter, Polly Rowles, C. Henry Gordon, Walter Coy, Hobart Cavanaugh, Mary Alice Rice, and Ralph Forbes. The film was released on November 8, 1936, by Universal Pictures.

== Cast ==
- Henry Hunter as John Aldrich
- Polly Rowles as Lydia Todd
- C. Henry Gordon as Lt. Valcour
- Walter Coy as Charley Warren
- Hobart Cavanaugh as Chester Blodgett
- Mary Alice Rice as Jenny Aldrich
- Ralph Forbes as Meredith Landers
- Alma Kruger as Veronica Todd
- Samuel S. Hinds as Artemus Todd
- Rollo Lloyd as Sigurd Repellen
- Warren Hymer as Chuck
- Virginia Brissac as Mrs. Blodgett
- Halliwell Hobbes as Hotchkiss
- Reynolds Denniston as Captain Daws
- Pierre Watkin as Hobbs
- Georges Renavent as Harrington
- Howard Hickman as Dr. Webster
- Al Hill as Chick
- Olaf Hytten as Thompson
- Sam McDaniel as Garage Attendant
- Edward LeSaint as Dr. Edson
- Max Wagner as Doolin
- Arthur Yeoman as Attendant
- Henry Sylvester as Doorman
