= Rain for a Dusty Summer =

1971 film

- Original film poster
- Directed by: Arthur Lubin
- Written by: G.B. Buscemi; Julius Evans
- Based on: story by Leo Brady; Franklin Lacey
- Produced by: G.B. Buscemi
- Starring: Humberto Almazán; Ernest Borgnine
- Cinematography: Manuel Berenguer
- Music by: Wade Denning
- Release date: 1971
- Running time: 93 mins
- Country: United States
- Language: English

Rain for a Dusty Summer, originally known as Miguel Pro and released on DVD as Guns of the Revolution, is a 1971 Mexican revolution film. Shot on location in Spain, it depicts the life and death of Mexican priest Miguel Pro during the Cristero War. The lead role was played by Humberto Almazán, an actor who left the industry to become a priest and returned to acting for this film. The movie was the final feature film of director Arthur Lubin.

== Plot ==
In 1917 Mexico, the new government has commenced a war against the Church. Priests are rounded up and executed, churches burned down and religion outlawed. A carefree happy priest has to go on the run but returns to his nation to perform his priestly duties.

== Cast ==
- Humberto Almazán as Miguel Pro (as Padre Humberto)
- Ernest Borgnine as The General
- Sancho Gracia as Humberto Pro
- Aldo Sambrell as Col. Marinos
- Harry Harris as Joe Weiler
- Nela Conjiu as Señora Pro
- Carlos Casaravilla as Capt. Larrea
- Vicente Sangiovanni as Luis Vilches
- Maida Severn as Señora Altera
- Gemma Cuervo as Loreto
- Marta Flores as Margarita
- Tina Sáinz as Ana Pro
- Asunción Vitoria as Nita
- Florencio Calpe as the Rector
- Martín Porras as Roberto Pro
- Gustavo Re as a Prison Official
- Moisés Augusto Rocha as a Witness
- Ángel Álvarez as The Bishop

== Production ==
Arthur Lubin said he was approached to make the film after Mr Ed was done and he accepted because "no one seemed to want me because there were no animal pictures around and I grabbed at the opportunity to make this picture." He said it was shot in Spain rather than Mexico because Spain was cheaper and that the leading man as a priest who used to be an actor and took time off from preaching to act in the film.

Lubin admitted "it was a strange subject for me to make" and that the film was particularly financed "by a very wealthy banker in Kansas City who was a very devoted Catholic."

== Reception ==
Diabolique magazine later wrote "this is sometimes called a spaghetti Western, but it isn't really… It's more a priest-on-the-run story, where a guitar-playing man of the cloth tries to escape army prosecution during the 1917 Mexican Revolution. This film's a hard slog, badly dubbed and veers wildly in tone (one minute the priest is in drag, the next he's being executed by firing squad). It's very pro-Catholic, as if Lubin was trying to make amends to the Legion of Decency for To the People of the United States by making a bad Leo McCarey movie."

== See also ==
- The Fugitive (1947 film)
- Cristiada (film)
