= Escapade in Japan =

1957 film by Arthur Lubin

- Directed by: Arthur Lubin
- Written by: Winston Miller
- Story by: Winston Miller
- Produced by: Arthur Lubin
- Starring: Teresa Wright; Cameron Mitchell; Jon Provost
- Cinematography: William Snyder
- Edited by: Otto Ludwig
- Music by: Max Steiner
- Production company: Arthur Lubin Productions
- Distributed by: RKO Radio Pictures
- Release date: October 17, 1957
- Running time: 93 minutes
- Country: United States
- Language: English

Escapade in Japan is a 1957 American family adventure film. It was directed by Arthur Lubin and starred Teresa Wright, Cameron Mitchell, Jon Provost and Roger Nakagawa.

It also featured an early (and uncredited) appearance of Clint Eastwood as a pilot.

Lubin said "I think that Escapade probably ranks in my own opinion as fine of a picture as The Phantom of the Opera" although it suffered at the box office because Universal refused to promote it.

== Plot ==
After his plane goes down, an American boy is rescued from the sea by a Japanese fisherman and his family. When police arrive in the village, the fisherman's son fears that they have done something wrong. He and the American boy go on the run. They meet interesting people and have many adventures, travelling across the country and eluding the police, who are searching for the American boy.

== Cast ==
- Teresa Wright as Mary Saunders
- Cameron Mitchell as Richard Saunders
- Jon Provost as Tony Saunders
- Roger Nakagawa as Asahiko Tanaka
- Philip Ober as Col. Hargrave
- Kuniko Miyake as Michiko Tanaka
- Susumu Fujita as Kei Tanaka
- Katsuhiko Haida as Capt. Hibino
- Tatsuo Saito as Mr. Fushimi
- Hideko Koshikawa as Dekko
- Ureo Egawa as Chief of Kyoto police
- Frank Tokunaga as farmer
- Clint Eastwood as pilot
- Mila del Sol

== Production ==
The film was announced in May 1956 by RKO, who were expanding their operations. In June, RKO president William Dozier assigned the project to Arthur Lubin to produce and direct. Lubin had just signed a contract with the studio following The First Travelling Saleslady. He left for Tokyo and filming began 1 October.

Roger Nagawara was discovered in the American School in Japan. Jonn Provost was cast as the American boy.

RKO executive Arthur Siteman died of a heart attack while making the film in Japan.

== Reception ==
The Los Angeles Times described it as "a delightful tour through Japan." The New York Times said it was "simple but delightful."

== See also ==
- List of American films of 1957
