= Arthur Lubin =

American film director (1898–1995)

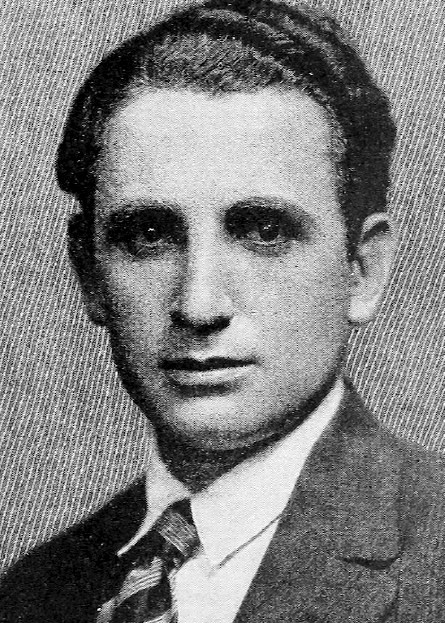
- Picture Play Magazine, June 1926
- Born: Arthur William Lubovsky; July 25, 1898; Los Angeles, United States
- Died: May 11, 1995 (aged 96); Glendale, California, United States
- Resting place: Cremains scattered at sea
- Occupations: Film director, writer, producer

Arthur Lubin (July 25, 1898 – May 11, 1995) was an American film director and producer who directed several Abbott & Costello films, Phantom of the Opera (1943), the Francis the Talking Mule film series and created the talking-horse TV series Mister Ed. A prominent director for Universal Pictures in the 1940s and 1950s, he is perhaps best known today as the man who gave Clint Eastwood his first contract in film.

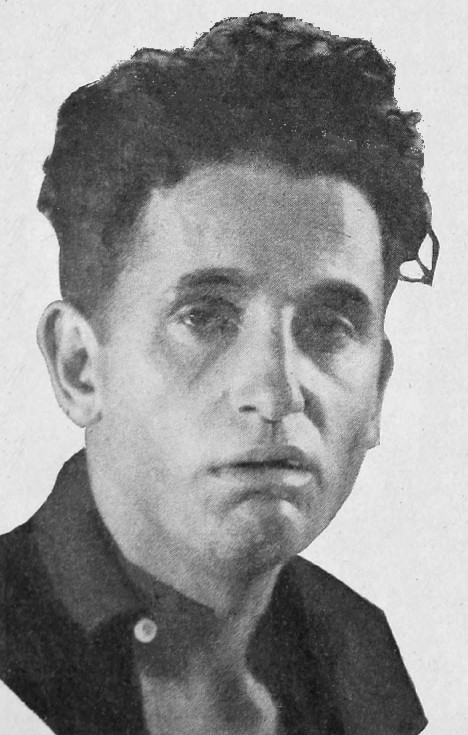
Lubin, Motion Picture Magazine, August 1928

== Early life ==
Arthur William Lubovsky was born in Los Angeles in 1898. His father, William Lubovsky, had come to the US from Poland in 1889. He originally lived in Willsborough, Pennsylvania then moved to California. Lubovsky changed his name to Lubin in honor of filmmaker Siegmund Lubin and became a salesman. Lubin says his father "became quite wealthy" due to his success selling clothes and investments in copper mines in Arizona.

His family moved to Jerome, Arizona, when Arthur was five. He was interested in acting at an early age, appearing in local Sunday school productions, with the encouragement of his mother, who died when Lubin was six. His father remarried and Lubin was sent away to the Page School for Little Boys, a military school. The family moved from Jerome to San Diego when Lubin was eight for the climate, to help with his step-mother's health. He managed the music and drama clubs at high school and said a key influence was playing the title role in The Vicar of Wakefield.

He joined the San Diego Stock Company at $12 a week; the director was John Griffith Wray and the actors including Harold Lloyd.

Lubin attended Carnegie Tech, in part on the recommendation of the head of English at his high school, because of its reputation as a drama school. He attended for three years and appeared regularly in plays.

As a child he had worked as a water boy for touring theatre companies, such as the Virginia Brissoe stock company, and volunteered for circuses. He briefly served in the navy in World War One and attended Carnegie Tech, where he studied drama and made money by shifting scenery and props. On graduation from college in 1922, he decided to become an actor. He started appearing at the Pasadena Playhouse and was soon seen by talent scouts and put in films.

He worked as a drama coach at Canadian Steel Mills before following one of his college drama teachers, B. Iden Payne, to New York.

== Actor ==
In New York, Lubin managed to get work on stage in such plays as The Red Poppy, Anything Might Happen and My Aunt from Ypsilanti. None of these plays were particularly successful so he moved to Hollywood, where he succeeded in getting roles in some films such as His People. He also acted in stage, notably at the Potboiler Act Theatre.

In 1925, the Los Angeles Times called Lubin "one of this year's juvenile screen sensations." He began directing shows for the Hollywood Writers Club.

Lubin later said "Whatever personality I had on the stage certainly wasn't photogenic. I was a little disappointed in the way I looked."

As an actor, he specialized in heavy melodrama, in sharp contrast with his later work as a film director. He later said "every part that Joseph Schildkraut did in New York, I did... on the Coast [Los Angeles]".

He appeared in Liliom. In 1925 he and some friends were charged with obscenity by the Los Angeles police for putting on a production of Eugene O'Neill's Desire Under the Elms. He later worked on Broadway, including Jealousy, where he replaced John Halliday opposite Fay Bainter.

A 1926 profile described him as a "genius" actor who was very down to earth: "When I met him, it was if I were meeting a young banker or a matter of fact businessman... human and charming... not only good but awfully good looking."

His films as an actor included The Woman on the Jury (1924), His People (1925), Bardelys the Magnificent (1926) with John Gilbert for King Vidor, Millionaires (1926), Afraid to Love (1927), The Wedding March (1928), The Bushranger (1928), Eyes of the Underworld (1929) and Times Square (1929), an early talking picture.

Over time Lubin's interests increasingly leant towards directing. "On the stage I had a personality I never had in pictures," he said. "That's one of the reasons I got the hell out of acting."

"Every director should have acting experience," he later said. "You can talk their language. You know the problems. You know how the scene should be acted. Too many directors are former writers. They have the scene in their mind but they don't know what the actor has to do to interpret it."

== Director and producer ==
=== Theatre ===
Lubin returned to New York gaining a job casting and directing with the firm of Crosby Graige and Selwyn. They wanted to try out summer shows in Greenwich and he directed two plays there. He went out to California and briefly returned to acting in Pasadena, then decided to stick with directing. He tried out two plays at the Pasadena Playhouse which he later produced and directed in New York with the financial help of Lee Schubert.

He produced When the Bough Breaks with Pauline Frederick, One Man with Paul Muni and another play with Lenore Ulric.

Lubin said Paul Bern "encouraged me to go back to New York because talking pictures were then coming in and he felt that most of the studios were engaging actors with stage experience."

He worked for nine months for the Ray-Minor Company, a subsidiary of Paramount. He later sued them for unpaid wages. However working for Ray-Minor which brought him to the attention of that studio's chief, B.P. Schulberg.

=== Paramount ===
In June 1932, Lubin returned to Hollywood to work for William Le Baron at Paramount as an associate producer. His contract included the right to return to New York in the first six months to produce and direct a play. He assisted Le Baron on films such as Hot Saturday, Night After Night, She Done Him Wrong' and Hello Everybody'.

Lubin began directing Little Theatre in his spare time, including productions of Lilliom, and got reputation for doing "outstanding work". He was fired from Paramount as part of an economy drive.

=== Monogram and Republic ===
Lubin received acclaim for directing a theatre production of The Green Bay Tree. He said "a man who knew my family [Hermann Slum]said to me, 'Why don't you come with us and Trem Carr and direct a picture?'" This was at Monogram, where he directed his first film as director: A Successful Failure (1934). It was followed by Great God Gold (1935) and Honeymoon Limited (1935), all of which were produced by Carr.

Carr went to MGM and Lubin moved over to Republic Pictures when they merged with Monogram. In May 1935, he signed a contract with Republic for a year to make six pictures starting with Two Black Sheep which became Two Sinners. He also made an experimental film, Journey by Train, He later made Frisco Waterfront (1935) and The House of a Thousand Candles (1936). These were produced by Nat Levine. In August 1935, Variety wrote about Republic, "under such fast production methods and with the limited budget [around $50,000 a film], training here is perfect for a jump into the big league. Arthur Lubin started with Republic last year, has so far turned out three good pictures." He was reportedly directing The Leavenworth Case but is not credited on the film.

== Universal ==
In 1936, he signed a contract with Universal starting 15 April. His first film for them was Yellowstone (1936). He was also asked to reshoot and recut parts of Nobody's Fool.

It was followed by Mysterious Crossing (1936), then a series of films with a young John Wayne: California Crossing (1937), I Cover the War (1937), Idol of the Crowds (1937) and Adventure's End (1937). "No one thought that Duke would ever amount to anything," recalled Lubin. The films were shot in six days. "I had the reputation of doing pictures quickly and bringing them in on schedule," he said.

In August 1937, he was in a car crash.

After Midnight Intruder (1938) with Louis Hayward, Lubin went over to Warner Bros., for The Beloved Brat (1938) then returned to Universal: Prison Break (1938), Secrets of a Nurse (1938), Newsboys' Home (1938), Risky Business (1939), Big Town Czar (1939), Mickey the Kid (1939), Call a Messenger (1939, with The Little Tough Guys), and The Big Guy (1939). Lubin said "possibly one of the reasons I was used so much at Universal was my very wonderful early training as a director under Trem Carr."

A higher profile project was Black Friday (1940), with Boris Karloff and Bela Lugosi. He went back to Republic to make Gangs of Chicago (1940) then returned to Universal: Meet the Wildcat (1940), I'm Nobody's Sweetheart Now (1940), Who Killed Aunt Maggie? (1940), The San Francisco Docks (1941) and Where Did You Get That Girl? (1941).

=== Abbott and Costello ===
Lubin's career received a big break when he was assigned to direct the first Abbott and Costello star vehicle, Buck Privates (1941). The movie was a big hit, earning $4 million – Lubin, who was paid $350 a week, was given a $5,000 bonus. "It was very little credit to the director," said Lubin later. "It consisted mainly of fabulous gags that these two wonderful guys knew from years and years of being in burlesque."

He directed the double act's next four movies, In the Navy (1941), which earned him another $5,000 bonus, Hold That Ghost (1941), shot before In the Navy but released afterwards, Keep 'Em Flying (1942) and Ride 'Em Cowboy (1942), shot before Keep 'Em Flying but released afterwards. All the films were successful – the services comedies between them brought in over $6 million and Variety magazine named Lubin the most commercially successful director in Hollywood in 1941. Variety said "Lubin, who was considered just another camera flagger, is now the leader of the entire topflight group of directors with respect to getting coin into the box office."

Lubin would use two cameras directing the duo, one on a two shot, the other on Lou. He said the cameras were on a dolly because the team could not be trusted to stay in position.

However Lubin says after the fifth film he asked if he could work on other movies:

They came on the set late, they didn't know their lines, and I think they were beginning to get tired of one another. They were bored. and for the first time they were beginning to complain about the scripts. But it was five fabulous pictures with the boys. They were very good for me. They gave me a reputation. I learned everything about timing from them. And I think I was very good for them, in this respect: not their routines, but in trying to give them some class. Whenever they got crude or rude, I'd try to soften it. And I tried in all my set-ups to keep a balance of refinement against the earthiness of some of their routines.

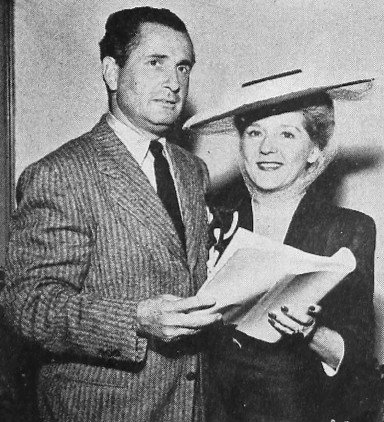
Lubin with Mary Pickford in 1943

=== At Universal and other studios ===
In January 1942, Lubin was assigned to an expensive war film, Eagle Squadron (1942), which was a massive hit. He was now established as one of Universal's leading directors. In 1942, The New York Times published a profile on the director which commented:

On the set, Lubin is personally intense, but an easy boss to his casts. He is friendly and witty. Players like to work for him. He strives to keep them relaxed for the cameras. Holding a pow-wow before rehearsing a scene, he will frequently sit cross legged on the floor with the players seated about him. But when the camera starts going, so does Lubin. He is a pacer... He pantomimed all the parts

Lubin made White Savage (1943) with Maria Montez, Jon Hall and Sabu, then was given his largest ever budget when he replaced Henry Koster on Phantom of the Opera (1943) with Claude Rains. This was a great success commercially, as was Ali Baba and the Forty Thieves (1944) with Montez, Hall and Sabu.

Lubin tried to get into the Signal Corps but they said he was more valuable making documentaries. Delightfully Dangerous (1945) was made for Hunt Stromberg and his old boss Charles Rogers at United Artists. Back at Universal he made The Spider Woman Strikes Back (1946), which he said he "hated" and did not want to do but the studio threatened to put him on suspension.

This was followed by the expensive box office disappointment Night in Paradise (1946). After the failure of this movie, Universal elected not to review his contract.

=== Independent Producer ===
He made two more for United Artists, New Orleans (1947) and Impact (1949). Lubin continued to direct theatre on the side, doing This Young World at the Pasadena Playhouse in 1948 which he later called "the best play I've done".

=== Francis the Talking Mule ===
He bought the rights to a series of books about Francis the Talking Mule and set up the project as a film at Universal. Francis (1950) was a big hit, leading to a series of films directed by Lubin, in which the director had a percentage of the profits. (Although records show Universal paid Lubin a flat fee of $25,000 to direct – $5,000 more than he had been paid for A Night in Paradise.) Francis Goes to the Races (1952) was the first sequel.

Lubin also made Queen for a Day (1951) for United Artists, and Rhubarb (1951) for Paramount. The latter film is about a cat that inherits a baseball team by proxy. Lubin was worried about being typed as an animal director. "Everyone seems to forget I once directed John Wayne," he said.

He made Francis Goes to West Point (1952), It Grows on Trees (1952), which was Irene Dunne's last film, South Sea Woman (1953) with Burt Lancaster at Warner Bros, and Francis Covers the Big Town (1953). He complained during filming the latter that he was becoming typecast as an animal director. He hoped to make The Interruption from a suspense story by W. W. Mason "just to remind producers that I can direct people too."

After the swashbuckler Star of India (1954) at United Artists, shot in England, there was Francis Joins the WACS (1954) before he succeeded in filming Interruption in England; this was later titled Footsteps in the Fog (1955).

Lady Godiva of Coventry (1955) was a period swashbuckler with Maureen O'Hara. It featured a young Clint Eastwood who Lubin had put under personal contract. Eastwood had a larger role in Francis in the Navy (1955), Lubin's last Francis movie; both he and star Donald O'Connor elected not to appear in Francis in the Haunted House (1956). Lubin then was let go by Universal; the directed later blamed this on the failure of Lady Godiva.

== Later films and television ==
Eastwood was given another support role in two films Lubin made for his own company released through RKO, The First Traveling Saleslady (1956) and Escapade in Japan (1957). In May 1956 Eastwood signed an exclusive three-year deal with Lubin.

=== Television ===
In the late 1950s, Lubin got involved in television. He directed episodic TV shows like Bronco (1958), New Comedy Showcase, Maverick (1959), Bonanza (1960), and The Addams Family (1965).

=== Mr Ed ===
His best known work was Mister Ed. Lubin had wanted to make a TV series based on Francis but was not able to secure the rights. Instead he optioned a series of short stories about a talking horse, Mr Ed, back in 1957. The pilot was financed by comedian George Burns, but Lubin was unable to sell it to a network. He decided to sell the show into syndication first, got a sponsor and managed to finance 26 episodes until the show was picked up by CBS. The show ran for six seasons and 143 episodes. Star Alan Young recalled the producer-director:

He was a very lovable character, but he was a character. He wanted to rush through and get things done quickly, and he didn't want to stay around the studio too long. I'll never forget one line he used. He didn't like people fooling around on the set, cracking jokes. He really didn't have a great sense of humor for a man who did so many comedies! I'll never forget when he said: "Stop that! Stop all this laughing! This is comedy, there's no time for laughter!" Well, we just all broke up. He didn't realize what he said, he didn't care.

As a longtime friend of Mae West, Lubin got her to appear on an episode of Mister Ed.

He directed the occasional feature, such as The Thief of Baghdad (1961), The Incredible Mr. Limpet (1964, with Don Knotts) and Hold On! (1966, with Herman's Hermits). Peter Noone who appeared in the latter remembers, "Arthur Lubin was really talented. He made us better than we actually were, which is what a good director does. I mean, this band was not exactly ready for Stanislavski."

Lubin's last feature was Rain for a Dusty Summer (1971). His last work was the 1978 Little Lulu TV special on ABC Weekend Special. Lubin's career ended in the late 1970s.

== Personal life ==
Lubin was gay and for many years lived with Frank Burford.

=== Death ===
He died at the Autumn Hills nursing home in Glendale, California, on May 11, 1995, at age 96.

Hospital worker and serial killer Efren Saldivar allegedly told people he killed dozens of sick and elderly patients; there was some fear that Lubin was one of these.

== Appraisal ==
Lubin said he directed 69 films of which "eight have been miserable flops". These included Mickey the Kid and Yellowstone.

In another interview he said he had three "really notable failures", Successful Failure, Yellowstone and Spider Woman Strikes Back.

== Filmography ==
=== As director or producer ===
- A Successful Failure (1934)
- Great God Gold (1935)
- Honeymoon Limited (1935)
- Two Sinners (1935)
- Frisco Waterfront (1935)
- The House of a Thousand Candles (1936)
- Yellowstone (1936)
- Mysterious Crossing (1936)
- California Straight Ahead! (1937)
- I Cover the War (1937)
- Idol of the Crowds (1937)
- Adventure's End (1937)
- Midnight Intruder (1938)
- The Beloved Brat (1938)
- Prison Break (1938)
- Secrets of a Nurse (1938)
- Newsboys' Home (1938)
- Risky Business (1939)
- Big Town Czar (1939)
- Mickey the Kid (1939)
- Call a Messenger (1939)
- The Big Guy (1939)
- Black Friday (1940)
- Gangs of Chicago (1940)
- Meet the Wildcat (1940)
- I'm Nobody's Sweetheart Now (1940)
- Who Killed Aunt Maggie? (1940)
- The San Francisco Docks (1940)
- Where Did You Get That Girl? (1941)
- Buck Privates (1941)
- In the Navy (1941)
- Hold That Ghost (1941)
- Keep 'Em Flying (1941)
- Ride 'Em Cowboy (1942)
- Eagle Squadron (1942)
- Keeping Fit (1942) (short)
- To the People of the United States (1943)
- White Savage (1943)
- Phantom of the Opera (1943)
- Ali Baba and the Forty Thieves (1944)
- Delightfully Dangerous (1945)
- The Spider Woman Strikes Back (1946)
- Night in Paradise (1946)
- New Orleans (1947)
- Impact (1949)
- Francis (1950)
- Francis Goes to the Races (1951)
- Queen for a Day (1951)
- Rhubarb (1951)
- Francis Goes to West Point (1952)
- It Grows on Trees (1952)
- Gobs in a Mess (1953) – short
- South Sea Woman (1953)
- Francis Covers the Big Town (1953)
- Star of India (1954)
- Francis Joins the WACS (1954)
- Footsteps in the Fog (1955)
- Francis in the Navy (1955)
- Lady Godiva of Coventry (1955)
- The First Traveling Saleslady (1956) – also producer
- Escapade in Japan (1957) – also producer
- The Thief of Baghdad (1961)
- The Incredible Mr. Limpet (1964)
- Hold On! (1966)
- Mister Terrific (1967)
- Rain for a Dusty Summer (1971)

=== As actor ===
- The Woman on the Jury (1924)
- His People (1925)
- Bardelys the Magnificent (1926)
- Millionaires (1926)
- Afraid to Love (1927)
- The Wedding March (1928)
- The Bushranger (1928)
- Eyes of the Underworld (1929)
- Times Square (1929)

=== Unmade films ===
- Sheila (1946) with Geraldine Fitzgerald – "the story of a woman to 40"
- Lady from Lloyds (1947)
- Babes in Toyland (1948)
- Miss Brown My Mother (circa 1952) – based on story by Leonard Merrick
- Wisdom of the Serpent (1952)
- The Israeli Story – romantic comedy set in Israel (circa 1957)
- An Old Spanish Custom – comedy set in Spain about an American diplomat
- Sex and Miss Mc-Adoo (circa 1957) based on a story by Adela Rogers St. Johns
- The Digger (1962) – about a man who falls for a steam engine
- The Ghost of Drury Lane (1954–1962) – a Phantom of the Opera type story from a script by Mrs. Wallace Reid

== Partial TV credits ==
- The Ed Wynn Show (1958)
- Westinghouse Desilu Playhouse (1959) – "The Comeback"
- Bronco (1959)
- 77 Sunset Strip (1959)
- The Deputy (1959–60)
- Maverick (1959–60)
- The Alaskans (1960)
- Cheyenne (1960)
- Lawman (1960)
- New Comedy Showcase (1960)
- Bonanza (1960)
- Mister Ed (1961–66) – also producer
- The Addams Family (1965)
- The Double Life of Henry Phyfe (1966)
- The Pruitts of Southampton (1967)
- Mr. Terrific (1967)
- ABC Weekend Specials (1978–81) – "If I'm lost, How Come I Found You?" (1978), "Little Lulu" (1978), "Arthur the Kid" (1981)

== Theatre credits ==
- The Taming of the Shrew (1916) – San Diego – actor
- The Red Poppy (20 Dec – Dec 1922) – actor
- Anything Might Happen (20 Feb – April 1923) – actor
- He Who Gets Slapped (1924) – Pasadena Playhouse, Los Angeles – actor
- Lilliom (1924) – Hollywood Art Theatre, Los Angeles – actor
- The Failures (1924) – The Potboilers, Los Angeles – actor
- Justice (1925) – Los Angeles – actor
- Hell Bent for Heaven (1925) – actor
- Madam or Saint (1925) – actor
- The Waltz of the Dogs (1925) – actor
- The Dream Play (1925) – Pasadena Players, Los Angeles – actor
- Monna Vanna (16 Nov 1925 for two weeks) – Pot Boiler Theatre, Los Angeles = with Ian Keith
- Desire Under the Elms (March 1926)
- The Great God Brown (26 Aug 1926 for two weeks) – Pasadena Playhouse
- Loyalties (April 1927)
- Jealousy with Fay Bainter (Jan 1929)
- This One Man (21 Oct – Nov 1930) – New York – director – cast included Paul Muni
- When the Bough Breaks (16 Feb – March 1932) – New York – director
- Her Man of Wax (11 Oct – Oct 1933) – director
- Growing Pains (23 Nov – Dec 1933) – director
- Lilliom (1933) – Pasadena Playhouse, Los Angeles – actor
- The Green Bay Tree (May 1934) – Belasco Theatre – director
- City Without Jews (1934) – Pasadenia Playhouse, Los Angeles – director
- This Young World (May 1948) – Pasadena Playhouse, Los Angeles – director – all-child cast included Dwayne Hickman and Darryl Hickman
