= Irving Actman =

American composer (1907–1967)

Irving Actman (June 2, 1907 – September 24, 1967) was an American conductor, musical director and composer. He is known for his work in film and on Broadway musicals, most notably as the music director of the original 1950 production of Guys and Dolls.

== Career ==
Actman was a conductor, musical director, and composer for various shows. Starting out as the accompanist for the vaudeville actress Lita Grey, he began a long collaboration with Frank Loesser. While performing at a club, The Back Drop, Actman was offered the job of composing the music for the 1936 Broadway revue The Illustrator's Show. The revue was a failure but, writing in the New York Evening Post, John Mason Brown singled out the Actman song "Bang-the Bell Rang" for praise.

In 1936, Actman moved to Hollywood under contract with Universal Studios. There, along with Loesser, he worked as a composer for a number of films and with composers like Jule Styne and Hoagy Carmichael. He composed music for the 1936 film Yellowstone and the 1936 film Postal Inspector. He also worked on music for the film Mayerling (1957 film).

Returning to New York in 1950, Actman was the musical director for the Tony Award winning original production of Guys and Dolls, a musical based on short stories by Damon Runyon.

Several of Actman's songs were recorded.

== Personal life ==
Actman was married to Catherine Hanley, a chorus girl in the Ziegfeld Follies. Their daughter, Jane Actman was an actress. Actman has been described as a heavy, good natured pianist. He accompanied one of Maurice Chevalier's performances.

== Theater ==
- The Illustrator's Show (48th Street Theatre, 1936). Composer.
- Earl Carroll's Sketchbook (Earl Carroll Theatre, 1929). Song composer.
- Maurice Chevalier (Henry Miller's Theatre, 1947). Music.
- Along Fifth Avenue (Broadhurst Theater, 1949). Musical director.
- Guys and Dolls (46th Street Theatre, 1950). Musical director.
- Guys and Dolls (City Center, 1965). Conductor.

== Filmography ==
- Postal Inspector (1936), songs
- Flying Hostess (1936), composer, "Bang! The Bell Rang", 1909
- The Man I Marry (1936), Composer.
- Mysterious Crossing (1936), Composer.
- Freshman Year (1938), Composer.
- Slightly Honorable (1939), Music.
