= Henry Hunter (actor) =

American actor (1907–1985)

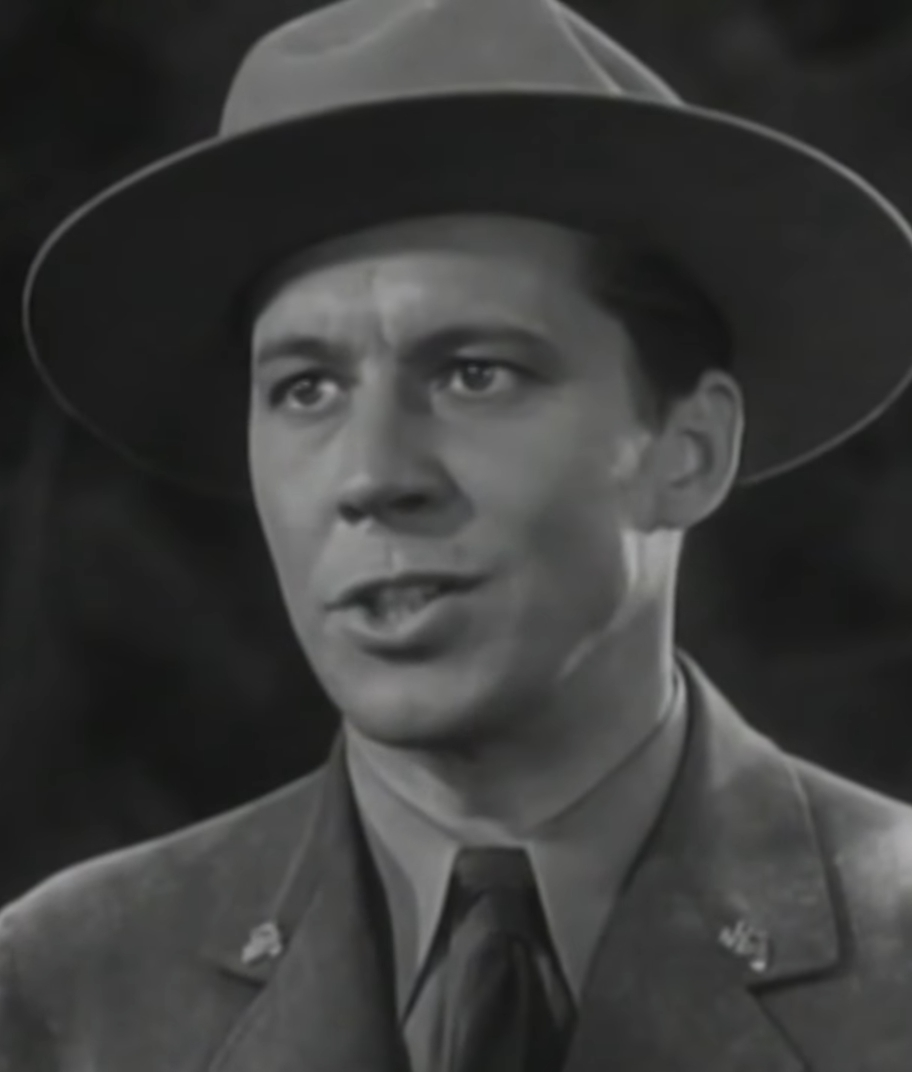
- Hunter in Yellowstone (1936)
- Born: Frederick Arthur Jacobson Jr. October 9, 1907; Hackensack, New Jersey, U.S.
- Died: May 25, 1985 (aged 77); Los Angeles County, California, U.S.
- Occupation: Actor
- Years active: 1936–1986
- Spouse: Dorothy Black (m. 1936)
- Children: 1

Henry Hunter (born Frederick Arthur Jacobson Jr.; October 9, 1907 – May 25, 1985) was an American actor on radio, stage, and television and a director and manager in radio.

== Early years ==
Hunter was born Frederick Arthur Jacobson Jr. in Hackensack, New Jersey, the son of Mr. and Mrs. F. Arthur Jacobson. He had two sisters, one of whom was an actress billed as Roxanne Curtis. Hunter graduated from Hackensack High School, where he acted in plays, ran on the cross-country team and was president of the honor society. He also took classes at the Theater Guild School in New York, where he learned stage technique from Helen Hayes, Winifred Lenihan, and others. During his time there he performed in Prunella at the Garrick Theatre. He changed his name in 1936.

== Career ==
In 1925-26, Hunter acted in Androcles and the Lion with Edward G. Robinson at the Guild Theater. After that, he performed for a season with Eva Le Gallienne's Civic Repertory Company. He appeared on Broadway in Saturday Night (1926) and Twelfth Night (1926). Hunter next joined a Chautauqua troupe. For $60 per week he not only was leading man in the troupe's productions, but he also was stage manager and drove the truck that carried equipment for the troupe's tent performances throughout the southern United States. He eventually left that group and acted in Montreal, where he got married.

Following three seasons at His Majesty's Theatre and the Orpheum in Montreal, Hunter acted for one season in Atlanta at the Erlanger Theater and two seasons in Portland, Oregon, at the Dufwin Theater. When the Portland troupe went out of business, Hunter was left jobless, ending up selling programs at a six-day bicycle race. Six days' sales provided a net of $20 for him. Combining that amount with money borrowed on his insurance, he headed back to New York, but he stopped in Chicago with his funds down to 33 cents. A telephone call to a friend led him to the NBC studios there, where he found that the production manager was C. L. Menser, a friend from his days in New York. Menser hired Hunter immediately. His primary role became that of leading man with the Princess Pat Players. In the mid-1930s, Hunter acted on 10 NBC radio programs per week in Chicago. After he was spotted by a talent scout from Universal, he went to Hollywood, but he continued to act on radio.

Hunter's first feature film was Parole! (1936). His other films included Love Letters of a Star (1936), The Road Back (1937), A Girl with Ideas (1937), the serial Secret Agent X-9 (1937), and Yellowstone (1936).

On radio, Hunter portrayed Wolfe Bennett on Lone Journey, Ellis Smith on Guiding Light, Brooklyn on Wings of Destiny, Terry Regan on Attorney at Law, Anthony Marleybone II on Affairs of Anthony, Bill Crawford on Thunder Over Paradise, Jerry Quick on The National Farm and Home Hour, and Rev. Stanley Matthews on Waterloo Junction. He also had leading roles on Just Plain Bill, Lights Out, Ma Perkins, Mary Marlin, Girl Alone and Anne Thomas, Career Wife.

In 1941, Hunter became production director for NBC's radio operations in Chicago. After a promotion to production manager, he became program manager for both radio station WMAQ and the central division of NBC's radio operations. The network transferred him to Hollywood in 1951. There he directed a number of radio programs, including The Judy Canova Show, The Meredith Willson Show, This Is Hollywood, and The William Gargan Show.

Hunter returned to acting, this time on television, in 1951. TV programs on which he appeared included Alfred Hitchcock Presents, Celebrity Playhouse, Crusader, Leave It To Beaver, Ford Theater, Four Star Playhouse, I Led Three Lives, Jeanie, Lux Video Theater, Matinee Theater, Medic, The Millionaire, and Navy Log.

== Personal life ==
Hunter married Dorothy Black, who was leading lady with his Chautauqua troupe, and they had a son.

== Selected filmography ==
- 1955:Alfred Hitchcock Presents (Season 1 Episode 39: "Momentum") as Finance Company Agent
- 1960: Leave It To Beaver (Season 4 Episode 14: "Uncle Billy") as Barber
- 1962: Leave It To Beaver (Season 5 Episode 14: "Ward’s Golf Clubs") as Mr. Briggs
