= Honeymoon Limited =

1935 film by Arthur Lubin

- Directed by: Arthur Lubin
- Written by: Dorothy Reid; Betty Burbridge
- Based on: novel by Vida Hurst
- Produced by: Mrs Wallace Reid executive Trem Carr
- Starring: Neil Hamilton; Lloyd Hughes
- Cinematography: John W Boyle
- Edited by: Ernie Leadley
- Distributed by: Monogram Pictures
- Release date: 1935
- Running time: 72 mins
- Country: United States
- Language: English

Honeymoon Limited is a 1935 American film.

== Plot ==
A publisher bets an author that he won't be able to write a romantic adventure novel while on a walking trip from New York to San Francisco.

== Cast ==
- Neil Hamilton as Dick Spencer Gordon/Gulliver
- Irene Hervey as Judy Randall
- Lloyd Hughes as Henry Townsend
- Henry Kolker as Mr. Randall
- Lorin Raker as Babe Dawes/Molly Carver
- June Filmer as Jill Randall - Grandchild
- Joy Filmer as Jack Randall - Grandchild
- George 'Gabby' Hayes as Jasper Pinkham
- Helene Costello as Mrs. Randell
- Emerson Treacy as Bridegroom
- Gertrude Astor as Lady Devonshire
- Lee Moran as Reporter
- Virginia Brissac as Mrs. Van Twerp

== Production ==
Monogram bought the story from Vida Hurst in March 1934.

In March 1935 it was announced the film would be supervised by Mrs Wallace Reid. She had already produced Women Must Dress and Redhead for Monogram.

Neil Hamilton appeared in the film under a two-picture contract he signed with Trem Carr, head of Monogram. The other he did under contract was Keeper of the Bees.

It was the third film Lubin directed for Monogram. The Los Angeles Times said Lubin "had directed very successfully one or two other pictures which causes the belief that this feature will be especially bright lighted."

Filming took place in March 1935. The cast included several stars from the silent era such as Helene Costello, Neil Hamilton and Lloyd Hughes.
