= Parole! =

1936 American crime film directed by Lew Landers

- Theatrical release poster
- Directed by: Lew Landers
- Screenplay by: Kubec Glasmon; Horace McCoy
- Story by: Kubec Glasmon; Joel Sayre; Robert Dillon; Kay Morris
- Produced by: Robert Presnell Sr.
- Starring: Henry Hunter; Ann Preston; Alan Dinehart; Alan Baxter; Alan Hale Sr. Grant Mitchell
- Cinematography: George Robinson
- Edited by: Philip Cahn
- Production company: Universal Pictures
- Distributed by: Universal Pictures
- Release date: June 14, 1936
- Running time: 67 minutes
- Country: United States
- Language: English

Parole! is a 1936 American crime film directed by Lew Landers and written by Kubec Glasmon and Horace McCoy. The film stars Henry Hunter, Ann Preston, Alan Dinehart, Alan Baxter, Alan Hale Sr. and Grant Mitchell. The film was released on June 14, 1936, by Universal Pictures.

== Cast ==
- Henry Hunter as Russ Whalen
- Ann Preston as Frances Crawford
- Alan Dinehart as Richard Mallard
- Alan Baxter as Percy 'Okay' Smith
- Alan Hale Sr. as John Borchard
- Grant Mitchell as Marty Crawford
- Berton Churchill as Rex Gavin
- Noah Beery Jr. as Bobby Freeman
- Bernadene Hayes as Joyce Daniels
- Wallis Clark as Prison Warden
- John Miltern as Governor Slade
- Charles Richman as John 'Jack' Driscoll
- Frank Mills as Dummy Watts
- Selmer Jackson as Earl Bigbee
- Phillip Trent as Gregory
- Anthony Quinn as Zingo Browning
