= Yellowstone (film) =

1936 film by Arthur Lubin

- Video cover of 1936 movie Yellowstone
- Directed by: Arthur Lubin
- Written by: Jefferson Parker& Stuart Palmer; Houston Branch
- Based on: story by Arthur Phillips
- Produced by: Val Paul (associate producer)
- Starring: Henry Hunter; Judith Barrett; Andy Devine
- Cinematography: Milton R. Krasner
- Edited by: Maurice Wright
- Music by: Clifford Vaughan
- Color process: Black and white
- Production company: Universal Pictures
- Distributed by: Universal Pictures
- Release date: September 1, 1936 (United States)
- Running time: 63 minutes
- Country: United States
- Language: English

Yellowstone is a 1936 American Western film set in Yellowstone National Park, directed by Arthur Lubin.

The film, starring Judith Barrett, Henry Hunter, Ralph Morgan, Alan Hale, Raymond Hatton, and Andy Devine, combines murder mystery, romance, and natural setting. The famous historic building Old Faithful Inn is featured in the film.

Lubin called it "a silly story... they laughed Yellowstone off the screen. It was a very unfortunate picture."

== Plot ==
An ex-con is murdered in Yellowstone National Park while a bank robber's son is searching for the loot his father hid there 20 years before.

== Cast ==
- Henry Hunter as Dick Sherwood
- Judith Barrett as Ruth Foster
- Andy Devine as Pay-Day
- Alan Hale as Hardigan
- Ralph Morgan as James Foster
- Monroe Owsley as Marty Ryan
- Rollo Lloyd as Franklin Ross
- Raymond Hatton as Old Pete
- Paul Harvey as Radell
- Paul Fix as Dynamite
- Michael Loring as Merritt Billing

== Production ==
Filming started June 1936 with the majority taking place in the studio, with very little outdoor filming taking place in the national park.

== Soundtrack ==
- Unknown singer and the Universal Recording Orchestra - "From the Land of the Sky-Blue Water" (Music by Charles Wakefield Cadman, lyrics by Nelle Richmond Eberhart)
- Michael Loring - "Joggin' Along" (Music by Irving Actman, lyrics by Frank Loesser)

== Reception ==
The Christian Science Monitor called it "an inferior mystery story".

Diabolique called it "a decent thriller notable for its weak leads, robust support cast and incorporation of location photography at Yellowstone National Park."

Lubin called the film "horrible", one of what he considered the "eight flops" in his career.

In Grand Design, Tino Balio writes that "set in the national park, [it] wastes its scenic opportunities through unconvincing rear projection and cramped studio shots unimaginatively directed by Arthur Lubin.
