= Frisco Waterfront =

1935 film by Arthur Lubin

- Directed by: Arthur Lubin; Joseph Santley
- Written by: Norman Houston
- Produced by: Trem Carr
- Starring: Ben Lyon; Helen Twelvetrees; Rod La Rocque
- Cinematography: Harry Neumann
- Edited by: Carl Pierson
- Music by: Paul Van Loan
- Production company: Republic Pictures
- Distributed by: Republic Pictures
- Release date: December 3, 1935
- Running time: 66 minutes
- Country: United States
- Language: English

Frisco Waterfront is a 1935 American drama film directed by Arthur Lubin and Joseph Santley and starring Ben Lyon, Helen Twelvetrees and Rod La Rocque.

== Plot ==
Gubernatorial candidate Glen Burton hates newspaper editor Dan Elliott, who married Glen's former wife, Alice. On election day in San Francisco, Glen and Dan are both voting in a tent when a truck runs into it. As Glen is taken to the operating room, political boss Corrigan tells him that he is wrong to hate Dan. In the operating room, Glen relives his life.

In 1917, Glen and Alice were engaged, but Glenn was shipped out to serve in World War One and is reported as missing in action. Dan proposes marriage to Alice, and she accepts, but then Glenn appears, accusing Dan of being a war coward and trying to steal Alice.

Glen and Alice get married, and Glen studies to be a lawyer but is unable to find a job. Dan offers him one, but Glen refuses.

Glen gets a job on the waterfront and becomes a foreman, but Alice is upset at his lack of ambition. This causes them to argue, and she leaves him.

Alice suggests to Dan that they use Glen's hatred of them to inspire his ambition. Corrigan gets Glen a job in the district attorney's office, and Glen works his way up to district attorney. Glenn eventually runs for governor.

Glen goes through the operation successfully and wakes up to discover he has won the election and that Dan has died. Glen reunites with Alice.

== Cast ==
- Ben Lyon as Glenn Burton
- Helen Twelvetrees as Alice
- Rod La Rocque as Dan Elliott
- Russell Hopton as Eddie
- James Burke as Corrigan
- Henry Kolker as District Attorney
- Purnell Pratt as Dr. Stevens
- Barbara Pepper as The Blonde Stranger
- Lee Shumway as Foreman
- Norman Houston as Johnson

== Production ==
In April 1935, Republic announced they intended to make a film based on the novel Frisco Waterfront by Norman Houston, based on the 1934 West Coast waterfront strike.

Filming started in October 1935. It was the second film Lubin made for Republic.
