= Great God Gold =

1934 film by Arthur Lubin

Great Gold Gold
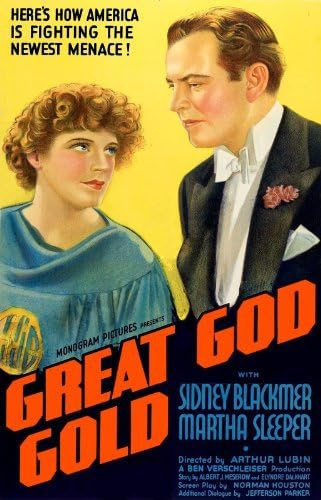
- Directed by: Arthur Lubin
- Written by: Norman Houston; Jefferson Parker
- Based on: story by Albert J. Meserow; Alynore Darlkhart
- Produced by: Ben Verschleiser executive Trem Carr
- Starring: Sidney Blackmer; Martha Sleeper
- Cinematography: Milton R. Krasner
- Production company: Monogram Pictures
- Distributed by: Monogram Pictures
- Release date: 15 April 1935
- Running time: 71 mins
- Country: United States
- Language: English

Great God Gold is a 1935 film. It was Arthur Lubin's second film as director.

== Plot ==
In the late 1920s, "Lucky" John Hart has a reputation as a stock market speculator. He does an interview with reported Phil "Stu" Stuart, which predicts the Wall Street Crash. Hart sells his investments just before the Crash.

Later lawyers Simon and Nitto suggest Hart use his reputation to make money in receiverships. Hart agrees in part because he desires Elena, the wife of Nitto's nephew Frank. Elena and Hart begin an affair.

Harper takes over receivership of the Excelsior Hotel whose president George Harper commits suicide. Harper's daughter Marcia seeks revenge. She falls in love with Stu.

Frank discovers his wife's infidelity and shoots Frank.

== Cast ==
- Sidney Blackmer as "Lucky" John Hart
- Martha Sleeper as Marcia Harper
- Regis Toomey as Phil "Stu" Stuart
- Edwin Maxwell as Nitto
- Ralf Harolde as Frank Nitto
- Maria Alba as Elena Nitto
- John T. Murray as Simon
- Gloria Shea as Gert

== Production ==
Filming began December 1934.

== Reception ==
The New York Times called it "a half hearted attack on the receivership racket... it's feeble as a crusade and sluggish as melodrama."

Writing for The Spectator, Graham Greene described the film as "an excellent American melodrama", commenting that despite the lack of big-name stars the acting displayed a "delightful vividness" and "even the hats have been carefully chosen: the crookeder the deal, the more flowing the brim".
