= Wallis Clark =

English actor (1882–1961)

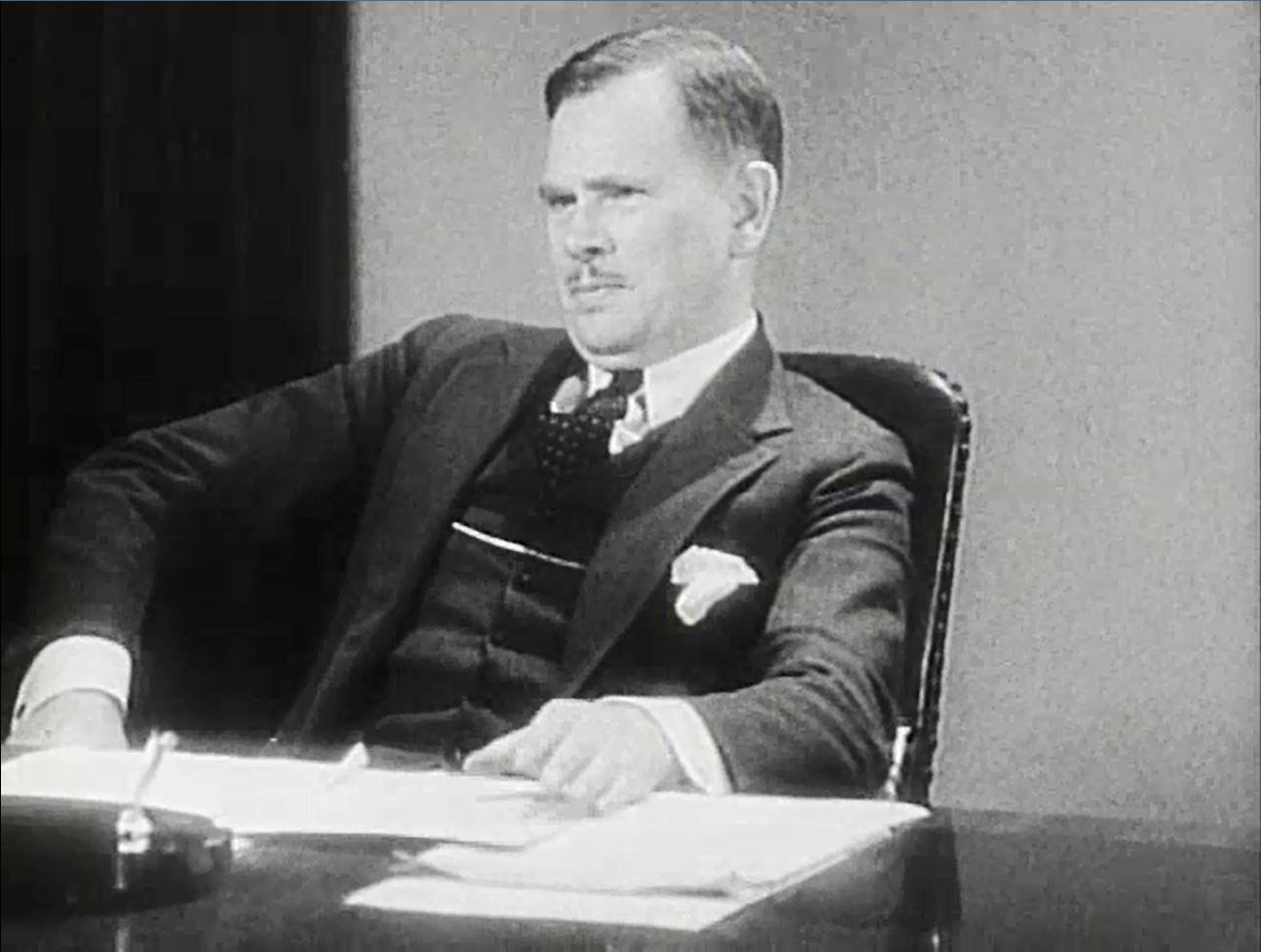
- Clark in Hell's House (1932)
- Born: Wallis Hensman Clark; 2 March 1882; Bolton, Lancashire, England
- Died: 14 February 1961 (aged 78)
- Occupation: Actor
- Years active: 1908–1953
- Spouse: Kate Byron
- Children: 1

Wallis Hensman Clark (2 March 1882 – 14 February 1961) was an English stage and film actor.

== Biography ==
Clark was born in Bolton, Lancashire, England, the son of William Wallis Clark (1854 - 1930), an engineer. Prior to acting, Clark was an engineer. He began his stage career in Margate, Kent, in 1908. He moved to the United States and acted in numerous plays on the stage, including at the Little Theatre in Philadelphia, for years before moving on to the screen in 1932.

He appeared in supporting roles in 136 films between 1931 and 1954. Five of these films won Best Picture: It Happened One Night (1934), Mutiny on the Bounty (1935), The Great Ziegfeld (1936), You Can't Take It with You (1938), and Gone with the Wind (1939). In four of these five films, Clark was uncredited. In Mutiny on the Bounty, he is credited in the role of Morrison.

== Selected filmography ==
- Elusive Isabel (1916) - Prince D'Abruzzi
- 20,000 Leagues Under the Sea (1916) - Pencroft
- Cy Whittaker's Ward (1917) - Bailey
- Hell's House (1932) - Judge Robinson
- The Final Edition (1932) - Police Commissioner Jim Conroy (uncredited)
- Alias the Doctor (1932) - Dr. Kleinschmidt (uncredited)
- Disorderly Conduct (1932) - Police Lieutenant (uncredited)
- Shopworn (1932) - Mr. Dean (uncredited)
- The Famous Ferguson Case (1932) - Lindsay Jamison (uncredited)
- Attorney for the Defense (1932) - Crowell
- My Pal, the King (1932) - Dr. Lorenz
- The Night Mayor (1932) - Crandall (uncredited)
- Okay, America! (1932) - Bit Role (uncredited)
- Big City Blues (1932) - Chief of Police (uncredited)
- The Night of June 13 (1932) - Defense Attorney (uncredited)
- Washington Merry-Go-Round (1932) - Carl Tilden (uncredited)
- Hidden Gold (1932) - Jones
- I Am a Fugitive from a Chain Gang (1932) - Chicago Lawyer (uncredited)
- If I Had a Million (1932) - Mr. Monroe - Bank Executive (uncredited)
- Forbidden Trail (1932) - Cash Karger
- Call Her Savage (1932) - Detective (uncredited)
- No Man of Her Own (1932) - Thomas Laidlaw (uncredited)
- They Just Had to Get Married (1932) - Fairchilds
- Madame Butterfly (1932) - Comm. Anderson
- The Match King (1932) - Erickson's Associate (uncredited)
- Luxury Liner (1933) - Dr. Veith
- Mystery of the Wax Museum (1933) - Autopsy Surgeon's Assistant (uncredited)
- 42nd Street (1933) - Dr. Chadwick (uncredited)
- Private Jones (1933) - Bit Part (uncredited)
- The World Gone Mad (1933) - Dist. Atty. Avery Henderson
- The Working Man (1933) - Mike - the Auditor (uncredited)
- The Kiss Before the Mirror (1933) - Public Prosecutor
- Double Harness (1933) - Postmaster General
- Tugboat Annie (1933) - Second Banker (uncredited)
- Lady for a Day (1933) - Commissioner (uncredited)
- Bureau of Missing Persons (1933) - Mr. Paul
- I Loved a Woman (1933) - Banker (uncredited)
- Police Car 17 (1933) - Lt. Dan Regan
- Ever in My Heart (1933) - Enoch Sewell (uncredited)
- Female (1933) - Board Member (uncredited)
- The World Changes (1933) - Mr. Freddie McCord - Clerk
- King for a Night (1933) - Judge (uncredited)
- The Meanest Gal in Town (1934) - Mr. Bowen - Barbershop Customer (uncredited)
- Massacre (1934) - Cochran
- Beloved (1934) - Yates
- I've Got Your Number (1934) - Mr. Madison
- A Woman's Man (1934) - Ralph Mallon - Studio Chief
- It Happened One Night (1934) - Lovington (uncredited)
- The Crime Doctor (1934) - Judge Mallory
- Men in White (1934) - Mr. Smith (uncredited)
- The Line-Up (1934) - Hotel Manager (uncredited)
- Stand Up and Cheer! (1934) - Senator (uncredited)
- Fog Over Frisco (1934) - Accountant (uncredited)
- The Life of Vergie Winters (1934) - Mr. Preston
- I Give My Love (1934) - Attorney (uncredited)
- Name the Woman (1934) - Det. Jeffries
- She Had to Choose (1934) - District Attorney
- Marie Galante (1934) - Head of Bureau in Washington (uncredited)
- Transatlantic Merry-Go-Round (1934) - Ship's Captain (uncredited)
- Cheating Cheaters (1934) - Mr. Palmer
- I'll Fix It (1934) - Cohagen
- The Secret Bride (1934) - Defense Attorney (uncredited)
- Enter Madame (1935) - John H. Massey (uncredited)
- Bordertown (1935) - Friend of Dean on Podium (uncredited)
- The Casino Murder Case (1935) - Dr. Elton (uncredited)
- It Happened in New York (1935) - Joe Blake
- Baby Face Harrington (1935) - Mr. Stokes (uncredited)
- $10 Raise (1935) - President water company (uncredited)
- The Flame Within (1935) - Man at Hospital Benefit (uncredited)
- Chinatown Squad (1935) - Police Lieutenant Norris
- Champagne for Breakfast (1935) - Reach
- Mutiny on the Bounty (1935) - Morrison
- Whipsaw (1935) - Agent Claymore (uncredited)
- White Lies (1935) - Prosecuting Attorney (uncredited)
- Three Live Ghosts (1936) - Detective Harris (uncredited)
- It Had to Happen (1936) - Immigration Officer (uncredited)
- The Return of Jimmy Valentine (1936) - Johnson (uncredited)
- Sutter's Gold (1936) - Defense Attorney (uncredited)
- The Great Ziegfeld (1936) - Stock Broker (uncredited)
- The First Baby (1936) - Williams (uncredited)
- The Unguarded Hour (1936) - Grainger
- Parole! (1936) - Prison Warden
- Easy Money (1936) - Mr. Curtis
- Ticket to Paradise (1936) - Editor (uncredited)
- Postal Inspector (1936) - Inspector Gil Pottle
- Romeo and Juliet (1936) - Town Watch (uncredited)
- Missing Girls (1936) - Senator Benson
- Craig's Wife (1936) - Mr. Burton (uncredited)
- Adventure in Manhattan (1936) - City Editor (uncredited)
- Come Closer, Folks (1936) - Mr. Houston
- Great Guy (1936) - Joel Green
- We Who Are About to Die (1937) - Dr. Hedges (uncredited)
- Woman in Distress (1937) - Mervyn Seymour
- Criminal Lawyer (1937) - Judge - Nora James' Trial (uncredited)
- The Last of Mrs. Cheyney (1937) - George
- I Promise to Pay (1937) - B.G. Wilson
- The Jones Family in Big Business (1937) - Mr. Rodney
- Parnell (1937) - Doctor (uncredited)
- The Wildcatter (1937) - Torrance
- She Had to Eat (1937) - Ralph Wilkinson - G-Man
- The Man Who Cried Wolf (1937) - Resident Doctor (uncredited)
- Escape by Night (1937) - District Attorney Baldwin
- Trapped by G-Men (1937) - Federal Agent #1
- Dangerously Yours (1937) - Insurance Agent (uncredited)
- Big Town Girl (1937) - Garvey (uncredited)
- Rosalie (1937) - Major Prentice (uncredited)
- The Higgins Family (1938) - George W. Bradshaw
- Hunted Men (1938) - Chief of Police (uncredited)
- You Can't Take It with You (1938) - Bill Hughes (uncredited)
- Personal Secretary (1938) - Fleming (uncredited)
- Star Reporter (1939) - District Attorney William Burnette
- Blondie Meets the Boss (1939) - Henry W. Philpot (uncredited)
- I Stole a Million (1939) - Jenkins - Mgr. of Cab Installment Sales (uncredited)
- Smuggled Cargo (1939) - Dr. Hamilton
- Main Street Lawyer (1939) - Reynolds
- Allegheny Uprising (1939) - McGlashan
- Gone with the Wind (1939) - Poker-Playing Captain (uncredited)
- The Big Guy (1939) - District Attorney
- Abe Lincoln in Illinois (1940) - Politician (uncredited)
- Vigil in the Night (1940) - Mr. Peterson - Board Member (uncredited)
- And One Was Beautiful (1940) - Judge (uncredited)
- Young Bill Hickok (1940) - Senator Tucker (uncredited)
- Penny Serenade (1941) - Judge
- Murder by Invitation (1941) - Judge Moore
- Ellery Queen and the Perfect Crime (1941) - Harmon (uncredited)
- Pacific Blackout (1941) - Pompous Doctor (uncredited)
- The Remarkable Andrew (1942) - City Treasurer R.R. McCall
- Hello, Annapolis (1942) - Mr. Nolan (uncredited)
- Yankee Doodle Dandy (1942) - President Theodore Roosevelt (uncredited)
- Tombstone, the Town Too Tough to Die (1942) - Ed Schieffelin
- Gentleman Jim (1942) - Judge Geary (uncredited)
- Random Harvest (1942) - Jones (uncredited)
- The Human Comedy (1943) - School Principal (uncredited)
- Mission to Moscow (1943) - Well-wisher with Bill (uncredited)
- Crime Doctor (1943) - Judge (uncredited)
- Bomber's Moon (1943) - Col. Sir Charles Sanford
- The Man from Down Under (1943) - The Major (uncredited)
- You're a Lucky Fellow, Mr. Smith (1943) - Travers (uncredited)
- Northern Pursuit (1943) - Judge (uncredited)
- Jack London (1943) - Theodore Roosevelt (uncredited)
- The Desert Song (1943) - Pajot (uncredited)
- Uncertain Glory (1944) - Razeau (uncredited)
- The Lady and the Monster (1944) - Warden (uncredited)
- Follow the Boys (1944) - HVC Committee Man (uncredited)
- Mr. Skeffington (1944) - Clubman (uncredited)
- Since You Went Away (1944) - Man at Cocktail Lounge (uncredited)
- Mrs. Parkington (1944) - Capt. McTavish (uncredited)
- National Velvet (1944) - Clerk of Scales (uncredited)
- The Captain from Köpenick (completed in 1941, released in 1945) - Friedrich Hoprecht
- Without Love (1945) - Prof. Thompson (uncredited)
- Conflict (1945) - Prof. Berens (uncredited)
- First Yank Into Tokyo (1945) - Dr. Langley (uncredited)
- Mildred Pierce (1945) - Wally's lawyer (uncredited)
- San Antonio (1945) - Tip Brice (uncredited)
- Devotion (1946) - Mr. George Smith (uncredited)
- That Forsyte Woman (1949) - Cabby (uncredited)
- Free for All (1949) - Mr. Van Alstyne
- The Toast of New Orleans' (1950) - Mr. O'Neill (uncredited)
- Kim (1950) - British General at Creighton's (uncredited)
- Criminal Lawyer (1951) - Melville Webber (uncredited)
- The Las Vegas Story (1952) - Allan Witwer (uncredited)
- She Couldn't Say No (1952) - Reverend Weaver (uncredited)
- Rogue's March (1953) - Brooks - Bill Collector (uncredited)
