= Mickey the Kid =

1939 film

- Directed by: Arthur Lubin
- Written by: Doris Malloy; Gordon Kahn
- Based on: story by Alice Altschuler
- Produced by: Herman Schlom
- Starring: Bruce Cabot; Ralph Byrd; ZaSu Pitts
- Cinematography: Jack A. Marta
- Edited by: William Morgan
- Music by: Cy Feuer
- Production company: Republic Pictures
- Distributed by: Republic Pictures
- Release date: July 3, 1939
- Running time: 68 minutes 53 minutes
- Country: United States
- Language: English

Mickey the Kid is a 1939 American drama film directed by Arthur Lubin and starring Bruce Cabot, Ralph Byrd and ZaSu Pitts. It was produced and distributed by Republic Pictures.

== Plot ==
Dr. Ben Cameron is worried about 12-year-old Mickey, son of Jim Adams, a widower who leads a corrupt and complicated life. Jim rebuffs a request by Jim to have Mickey be raised by Veronica Hudson, the boy's maternal grandmother. Mickey idolizes his father and wants to remain with him.

Pulling a bank robbery, Jim shoots and kills an unarmed teller. While on the run from the law, he realizes Mickey would be better off with Veronica and leaves his son in her care. Veronica enrolls the boy in school. His teacher, Sheila Roberts, is engaged to marry Ben.

Jim sneaks into Veronica's house one night to see his son. He hides in the attic at night, then takes the boy along when he leaves. Desperate to get away, Jim hijacks a school bus filled with children. When the bus gets waylaid by a snowstorm, Jim abandons the kids and is unable to persuade Mickey to do the same. FBI agents shoot Jim, who realizes as he dies that Mickey's life will be better without him.

== Cast ==
- Bruce Cabot as Jim Adams
- Jessie Ralph as Veronica
- Ralph Byrd as Ben
- ZaSu Pitts as Lilly
- June Storey as Sheila
- John Qualen as Mailman
- Archie Twitchell as Shelby, the Bus Driver

== Production ==
The film was known as Stand Up and Sing. It was based on the heroism of a school boy in a Colorado blizzard a few years previously. Cabot was cast in April. The title was changed in May. Filming started in May.

== Reception ==
The Los Angeles Times called it "fairly good though slightly spotty."

Lubin considered the film "horrible" and said it was one of the eight flops in his career.
