= Milton Krasner =

American cinematographer (1904–1988)

Milton R. Krasner, A.S.C.
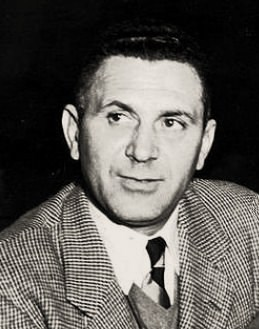
- Krasner on the set of The Egg and I (1947)
- Born: February 17, 1904; Brooklyn, New York, U.S.
- Died: July 17, 1988 (aged 84); Woodland Hills, California, U.S.
- Occupation: Cinematographer
- Years active: 1933–1977

Milton R. Krasner, A.S.C. (February 17, 1904 – July 17, 1988) was an American cinematographer who won an Academy Award for Three Coins in the Fountain (1954).

== Career ==
Working in films since the 1930s, Krasner is remembered for his work in the 1950s at 20th Century-Fox, where he photographed many of the studio's technicolor films, including Demetrius and the Gladiators (1954), Désirée (1954), The Rains of Ranchipur (1955), and others. His last film was Beneath the Planet of the Apes (1970).

Some of his memorable films include A Double Life, The Set-Up, All About Eve and The Seven Year Itch.

== Filmography ==
- I Love That Man (1933)
- Sitting Pretty (1933)
- Golden Harvest (1933)
- Strictly Personal (1933)
- Paris Interlude (1934)
- Death on the Diamond (1934)
- Here Comes the Groom (1934)
- Private Scandal (1934)
- The Great Flirtation (1934)
- She Made Her Bed (1934)
- Murder in the Fleet (1935)
- The Great Impersonation (1935)
- Great God Gold (1935)
- Women Must Dress (1935)
- Cheers of the Crowd (1935)
- Hold 'em, Yale (1935)
- Honeymoon Limited (1935)
- The Virginia Judge (1935)
- Forbidden Heaven (1935)
- Laughing Irish Eyes (1936)
- Mister Cinderella (1936)
- Crash Donovan (1936)
- Mysterious Crossing (1936)
- Yellowstone (1936)
- Arbor Day (1936)
- The Girl on the Front Page (1936)
- Love Letters of a Star (1936)
- She's Dangerous (1937)
- Midnight Intruder (1937)
- There Goes the Groom (1937)
- A Girl With Ideas (1937)
- Love in a Bungalow (1937)
- Prescription for Romance (1937)
- We Have Our Moments (1937)
- The Lady Fights Back (1937)
- Oh, Doctor! (1937)
- The Missing Guest (1938)
- The Crime of Dr. Hallet (1938)
- Newsboys' Home (1938)
- The Jury's Secret (1938)
- Nurse From Brooklyn (1938)
- The Storm (1938)
- The Devil's Party (1938)
- Missing Evidence (1939)
- The House of Fear (1939)
- You Can't Cheat an Honest Man (1939)
- I Stole a Million (1939)
- The Family Next Door (1939)
- Little Accident (1939)
- Man from Montreal (1939)
- Diamond Frontier (1940)
- The Bank Dick (1940)
- Beat Me Daddy, Eight to the Bar (1940)
- Sandy is a Lady (1940)
- Ski Patrol (1940)
- Oh, Johnny, How You Can Love! (1940)
- The House of the Seven Gables (1940)
- Man From Montreal (1940)
- Trail of the Vigilantes (1940)
- The Invisible Man Returns (1940)
- Hired Wife (1940)
- Zanzibar (1940)
- Private Affairs (1940)
- Paris Calling (1941)
- Buck Privates (1941)
- This Woman is Mine (1941)
- Bachelor Daddy (1941)
- Too Many Blondes (1941)
- The Lady from Cheyenne (1941)
- Swing Frolic (1942)
- The Spoilers (1942)
- A Gentleman After Dark (1942)
- Pardon My Sarong (1942)
- Men of Texas (1942)
- The Ghost of Frankenstein (1942)
- Arabian Nights (1942)
- Gung Ho! (1943)
- We've Never Been Licked (1943)
- The Mad Ghoul (1943)
- Two Tickets to London (1943)
- So's Your Uncle (1943)
- The Woman in the Window (1944)
- The Invisible Man's Revenge (1944)
- Hat Check Honey (1944)
- Delightfully Dangerous (1945)
- Scarlet Street (1945)
- Along Came Jones (1945)
- The Dark Mirror (1946)
- Without Reservations (1946)
- The Egg and I (1947)
- A Double Life (1947)
- The Farmer's Daughter (1947)
- Something in the Wind (1947)
- The Saxon Charm (1948)
- Up in Central Park (1948)
- The Accused (1949)
- The Set-Up (1949)
- Holiday Affair (1949)
- House of Strangers (1949)
- All About Eve (1950)
- No Way Out (1950)
- Three Came Home (1950)
- The Model and the Marriage Broker (1951)
- Half Angel (1951)
- Rawhide (1951)
- I Can Get It for You Wholesale (1951)
- People Will Talk (1951)
- Dreamboat (1952)
- Monkey Business (1952)
- Deadline – U.S.A. (1952)
- Phone Call from a Stranger (1952)
- O. Henry's Full House (1952)
- Dream Wife (1953)
- Vicki (1953)
- Taxi (1953)
- Garden of Evil (1954)
- Désirée (1954)
- Roger Wagner Chorale (1954)
- Three Coins in the Fountain (1954)
- Demetrius and the Gladiators (1954)
- The Rains of Ranchipur (1955)
- How to Be Very, Very Popular (1955)
- The Seven Year Itch (1955)
- The Girl in the Red Velvet Swing (1955)
- 23 Paces to Baker Street (1956)
- Bus Stop (1956)
- Kiss Them For Me (1957)
- Boy on a Dolphin (1957)
- An Affair to Remember (1957)
- The Gift of Love (1958)
- A Certain Smile (1958)
- The Man Who Understood Women (1959)
- Count Your Blessings (1959)
- The Remarkable Mr. Pennypacker (1959)
- Bells Are Ringing (1960)
- Home From the Hill (1960)
- Go Naked in the World (1960)
- King of Kings (1961)
- The Four Horsemen of the Apocalypse (1962)
- Two Weeks in Another Town (1962)
- Sweet Bird of Youth (1962)
- How the West Was Won (1962)
- The Courtship of Eddie's Father (1963)
- A Ticklish Affair (1963)
- Love with the Proper Stranger (1963)
- Goodbye Charlie (1964)
- Looking for Love (1964)
- Advance to the Rear (1964)
- Fate is the Hunter (1964)
- Made in Paris (1965)
- The Sandpiper (1965)
- Red Line 7000 (1965)
- The Singing Nun (1966)
- The Venetian Affair (1966)
- Hurry Sundown (1967)
- The St. Valentine's Day Massacre (1967)
- The Ballad of Josie (1967)
- Don't Just Stand There! (1968)
- The Sterile Cuckoo (1969)
- Beneath the Planet of the Apes (1970)

== Awards ==
Wins

- Cannes Film Festival: Best Cinematography, for The Set-Up; 1949.
- Academy Awards: Oscar, Best Color Cinematography, for: Three Coins in the Fountain; 1955.

Nominations

- Academy Awards: Oscar, Best Color Cinematography, for Arabian Nights; shared with: William V. Skall and W. Howard Greene; 1943.
