= Meet the Wildcat =

1940 film by Arthur Lubin

- Directed by: Arthur Lubin
- Written by: Alex Gottlieb
- Based on: story by Gottlieb
- Produced by: Joseph G. Sanford
- Starring: Ralph Bellamy; Margaret Lindsay; Joseph Schildkraut
- Cinematography: Stanley Cortez
- Edited by: Arthur Hilton
- Music by: Hans J. Salter
- Distributed by: Universal Pictures
- Release date: October 1940
- Running time: 61 minutes
- Country: United States
- Language: English

Meet the Wildcat is an American 1940 mystery film directed by Arthur Lubin starring Ralph Bellamy and Margaret Lindsay.

== Plot ==
One day in Mexico, magazine photographer Ann Larkin is in a museum when she happens to see a man steal a painting. Pursuing and accusing him, she believes the man, Brod Williams, to be a notorious art thief known only as "The Wildcat."

Brod brings the stolen painting to Leon Dumeray, a gallery owner. Dumeray recognizes it as stolen property and notifies the police, who place Brod under arrest. Ann comes to visit Brod in jail, but after complying with his request to bring him a pineapple from a local fruit stand, she is shocked to find a gun has been hidden inside it. Brod makes a daring escape, forcing Ann to switch clothing with him and fleeing the jail dressed as a woman.

Law authorities later congratulate Brod on his scheme. He is actually a police detective from New York City who is trying to smoke out Dumeray, who is the real Wildcat. He is offered a job by Dumeray, who now trusts Brod to be a dishonest man. Ann, however, doesn't know Dumeray is the thief and tips him off to Brod's true identity. Dumeray takes both as his prisoners, but Brod breaks free and calls for the police.

== Cast ==
- Ralph Bellamy as Lt. Brad Williams
- Margaret Lindsay as Ann Larkin
- Joseph Schildkraut as Leon Dumeray
- Allen Jenkins as Max Schwydel
- Jerome Cowan as Digby Vanderhood III
- Rudolph Anders as Feral - Henchman
- Frank Puglia as Chief of Police
- Guy D'Ennery as Mordaunt - Henchman
- Hans Herbert as Marco - Henchman
- Juan de la Cruz as National Museum Director
- Reed Hadley as Basso - Henchman
- Gloria Hadley as Annabelle Lee
- Iris Adrian as Jail Cell Blonde

== Production ==
Filming started August 1940. Bellamy was cast shortly before filming began.

== Reception ==
The New York Times called it "an obvious picture" but one that was "deftly and amusingly played" and "breezes along at a smooth pace."

Diabolique magazine called it "a really fun mystery comedy with Margaret Lindsay in superb form as a photographer convinced Ralph Bellamy (miscast, trying to channel Cary Grant) is an art thief."
