= Postal Inspector =

1936 film by Otto Brower

- Directed by: Otto Brower
- Written by: Horace McCoy (screenplay); Horace McCoy (story); Robert Presnell Sr. (story)
- Produced by: Robert Presnell Sr. (associate producer)
- Starring: Patricia Ellis; Ricardo Cortez; Bela Lugosi
- Cinematography: George Robinson
- Edited by: Philip Cahn
- Music by: Clifford Vaughan
- Distributed by: Universal Pictures
- Release date: August 16, 1936
- Running time: 58 minutes
- Country: United States
- Language: English

Postal Inspector is a 1936 American crime film directed by Otto Brower and starring Patricia Ellis, Ricardo Cortez and Bela Lugosi. It was produced and distributed by Universal Pictures.

== Plot summary ==
Bill Davis is a federal postal inspector. When he returns home to Milltown from a business trip in Washington, D.C., he meets singer Connie Larrimore on the plane. When they land, Bill is met by his brother Charlie, who is already acquainted with Connie.

At a nightclub owned by Gregory Benez, where Connie sings, Charlie and Connie hear about a shipment of $3 million in retired currency being scheduled. Benez, who is heavily in debt, schemes with a man named Ritter who has recently lost money as a victim of possible mail fraud.

A flood in a nearby town affects the shipment's route. Charlie goes to the scene with the National Guard and is aided by Connie, who volunteers as a relief worker. Benez and his accomplices rob the shipment. Charlie is in love with Connie and quarrels with his brother when Bill asks if she told Benez about the cash shipment. A speedboat is used to head off the thieves, Benez is sent to prison and Charlie invites his brother to his wedding to Connie.

== Cast ==
- Ricardo Cortez as Inspector Bill Davis
- Patricia Ellis as Connie Larrimore
- Michael Loring as Charlie Davis
- Bela Lugosi as Gregory Benez
- Wallis Clark as Inspector Gil Pottle
- Arthur Loft as Inspector Gene Richards
- David Oliver as 'Butch'
- Guy Usher as Evans
- Bill Burrud as Billy, The Boy
- Harry Beresford as Ritter
- Spencer Charters as Grumpy
- Hattie McDaniel as Deborah, the maid
- Landers Stevens as Doctor Doyle
- Flora Finch as The Ugly Fraud (uncredited)

== Production ==
Lew Landers was originally slated to direct Postal Inspector, but he was replaced before filming began. Newsreel footage of flooding in New England, and stock footage of postal processes, were used in the film. Postal Inspector was the last picture Bela Lugosi made under his contract at Universal Pictures.

== Soundtrack ==
- "Hot Towel" (Music by Irving Actman, lyrics by Frank Loesser)
- "Let's Have Bluebirds on All Our Wallpaper" (Music by Irving Actman, lyrics by Frank Loesser)

== See also ==
- List of American films of 1936
- Public domain film
- List of films in the public domain in the United States
