= Secrets of a Nurse =

1938 film by Arthur Lubin

- Directed by: Arthur Lubin
- Written by: Lester Cole; Tom Lennon
- Based on: story "West Side Miracle" by Quentin Reynolds
- Produced by: Burt Kelly
- Starring: Edmund Lowe; Helen Mack; Dick Foran
- Distributed by: Universal Pictures
- Release date: 2 December 1938
- Running time: 75 mins
- Country: United States
- Language: English
- Budget: $96,000

Secrets of a Nurse is a 1938 American sports drama film directed by Arthur Lubin and starring Edmund Lowe, Helen Mack, and Dick Foran.

Universal liked the film so much, they assigned Lubin to make Forgotten Boys a film about young men facing unemployment out of college. (It appears this film was never made).

== Cast ==
- Edmund Lowe as John Dodge
- Helen Mack as Katherine McDonald
- Dick Foran as Lee Burke
- Samuel S. Hinds as Judge Corrigan
- Paul Hurst as Slice Cavanaugh
- Leon Ames as Joe Largo
- Paul Fix as Smiley

== Production ==
The film was based on a magazine story by Quentin Reynolds, "West Side Miracle". Universal purchased the screen rights in July 1936. Arthur Lubin signed to direct in September 1938. Filming started 26 September.

== Reception ==
The Christian Science Monitor said it was "Abundant in negative qualities".

The New York Times reviewer said it had an "Exhaustive collection of melodramatic coincidences."
