= Delightfully Dangerous =

1945 film by Arthur Lubin

- Original film poster
- Directed by: Arthur Lubin
- Written by: Walter DeLeon; Arthur Phillips
- Screenplay by: Irving Phillips; Edward Verdier
- Story by: Frank Tashlin
- Produced by: Charles R. Rogers
- Starring: Jane Powell; Ralph Bellamy; Constance Moore; Morton Gould; Arthur Treacher; Louise Beavers; Ruth Tobey
- Cinematography: Milton R. Krasner
- Edited by: Harvey Manger
- Music by: Morton Gould
- Production company: Charles R. Rogers Productions
- Distributed by: United Artists
- Release date: March 31, 1945
- Running time: 92 minutes
- Country: United States
- Language: English
- Budget: $850,000-$900,000

Delightfully Dangerous

Delightfully Dangerous is a 1945 American musical comedy film directed by Arthur Lubin showcasing teenage singer Jane Powell—in her second film on loan out to United Artists from MGM—and orchestra leader Morton Gould. The working titles of this film were Cinderella Goes to War, Reaching for the Stars and High Among the Stars. It was Frank Tashlin's first writing credit on a live action feature film.

Lubin said "it wasn't a big picture, it was a small picture, it was a charming diversive moment."

== Plot ==
High school music student Sherry Williams is excited that her actress sister Jo has taken time off from her New York stage career to visit Sherry's school to see her perform in a musical play. Jo is about to step off the train when she hears that a famed Broadway show producer, Arthur Hale, is also stepping off the same train, leading Jo to depart from the other side of the train and make her own way to Sherry's play.

Arthur also is attending Sherry's school play. He overhears one of the older girls ridiculing Sherry's claim that her sister is a stage singer; the girl doubts that Sherry's sister even exists. Arthur comes to the rescue by praising Jo's performances on stage. Arthur, who is casting a new play, appreciates Sherry's voice but believes she is too young to appear on Broadway.

Jo, Sherry, and Arthur meet after the play but no one is the wiser as to the reasons for Jo's mysterious entrance. Jo also turns down an offer to audition for Arthur's play.

On a trip to New York with her schoolfriend, Sherry rings Jo's hotel where the clerk tells her she is performing in one of the theatres on 42nd Street. Sherry discovers that Jo is not a Broadway star, but a leading burlesque performer. Initially broken hearted, Sherry schemes that if she dresses to look older she will win the part in Arthur's show and support Jo so she leaves burlesque. Arthur can not believe she can pass for over 18 but a score of servicemen at a nightclub prove Arthur wrong.

When bandleader Morton Gould hears Sherry singing along to the music, he invites her up to sing on the stage. Based on this performance, a radio producer in the audience offers her a contract. He retracts the offer, however, when he learns that Sherry's sister is a burlesque performer. Meanwhile, Arthur shows romantic interest in Jo, but she coldly rebuffs him.

Stung by this rejection, Arthur retreats to his apartment to work on his upcoming musical, based on the music of Johann Strauss. He feels the show is destined to be a failure because the musical score simply doesn't work.

As Sherry and Jo discuss Arthur's musical, Jo expresses the opinion that the show will fail because audiences are looking for something more up-to-date than stuffy old Viennese waltzes. She demonstrates by improvising a jazzy version of a Strauss tune. Sherry then borrows her roommate's recording machine and secretly makes a record of Jo singing her tune.

Sherry forces her way into Arthur's apartment and pesters him into listening to the record. He is impressed in spite of himself, and hits upon a new idea for the show.

Soon after, the musical hit "Mr. Strauss Goes To Town" opens on Broadway, co-starring Jo and Sherry. The production mixes the traditional Strauss music (sung by Sherry in an old-fashioned operetta costume) with updated jazz interpretations of the tunes, performed by Jo in a showgirl outfit. As they perform together on stage, Jo tells Sherry that she will accept Arthur's proposal of marriage.

== Cast ==
- Jane Powell as Sherry Williams
- Ralph Bellamy as Arthur Hale
- Constance Moore as Josephine 'Jo' Williams / Bubbles Barton
- Morton Gould as Himself – Bandleader
- Arthur Treacher as Jeffers, Hale's Butler
- Louise Beavers as Hannah, Jo's Maid
- Ruth Tobey as Molly Bradley, Sherry's Roommate

== Production ==
The film was known as Reach Among the Stars then High Among the Stars. Jane Powell was borrowed from MGM to star; it was only her second film. In July 1944 Arthur Lubin was borrowed from Universal to direct. Brian Aherne and Susan Hayward were announced as her co stars. In August it was announced that Aherne and Hayward would be replaced by Ralph Bellamy and Constance Moore. In July 1944 Morton Gould arrived in Hollywood to write songs for the film while Eddie Heyman would write lyrics. Walter Deleon and Arthur Phillips were borrowed from Paramount to rewrite the screenplay. The film was executive produced by Hunt Stromberg.

In October 1944 the title was changed from High Among the Stars to Delightfully Dangerous. Jane Powell wrote in her memoirs that Ralph Bellamy "said time and time again, 'That was the worst movie I ever made.' And I'm inclined to agree... I didn't know it wasn't a good film. I had a good time making it." Powell says Morton Gould was "miserable" during filming because he had never made a movie before and was very self conscious.

== Soundtrack ==
- Constance Moore – "I'm Only Teasin'" (Music by Morton Gould, lyrics by Edward Heyman)
- Jane Powell – "Once Upon a Song" (Music by Morton Gould, lyrics by Edward Heyman)
- Chorus at the burlesque house – "Adirondack Mama"
- Jane Powell – "Through Your Eyes ... to Your Heart" (Music by Morton Gould, lyrics by Edward Heyman)
- Jane Powell and Morton Gould's Orchestra led by Morton Gould – "In a Shower of Stars" (Music by Morton Gould, lyrics by Edward Heyman)
- "Mr. Strauss Goes to Town" (medley of waltzes) (Written by Johann Strauß, new lyrics by Edward Heyman)

== Reception ==
The New York Times criticised the film's "insipid book, production numbers which are pretentious and dull and a score that at best is only occasionally melodious" and wrote the film is "without pace" although thought Powell was "sweet and charming – not the least bit cloying."

Diabolique magazine called it "dull and sluggish, with a poor script and inadequate casting (apart from the surprisingly un-annoying Powell)."

The film lost money.
