= Who Killed Aunt Maggie? =

1940 film

- Directed by: Arthur Lubin
- Written by: Stuart Palmer
- Based on: novel by Medora Field
- Produced by: Albert J. Cohen
- Starring: John Hubbard; Wendy Barrie
- Cinematography: Reggie Lanning
- Music by: Cy Feuer
- Production company: Republic Pictures
- Distributed by: Republic Pictures
- Release date: 1 November 1940
- Running time: 70 minutes
- Country: United States
- Language: English

Who Killed Aunt Maggie? is a 1940 American mystery film directed by Arthur Lubin and starring John Hubbard, Wendy Barrie and Mona Barrie. It was produced and distributed by Republic Pictures.

== Plot ==
Radio-mystery script writer Sally Ambler is about to be married but quarrels with her fiancé Kirk Pierce after he finds a story that she wrote to be too contrived. The wedding is postponed when a telegram arrives from Sally's aunt Maggie in Atlanta informing Sally that her uncle Charlie has died.

Sally is followed to Atlanta after a phone call from Dr. Benedict warns Kirk of danger lurking for Sally when she arrives there. Sally discovers that her uncle's corpse is missing and that he may have been murdered. Sally is the sole heir after Aunt Maggie is strangled, and her cousin Eve ends up dead as well after finding a secret room.

Dr. Benedict is revealed to have been behind the plot. After he is apprehended just in time, Sally and Kirk return home but argue again during their wedding ceremony over which kind of mystery plot is too unbelievable.

== Cast ==
- John Hubbard as Kirk Pierce
- Wendy Barrie as Sally Ambler
- Mona Barrie as Eve Benedict
- Joyce Compton as Cynthia Lou
- Walter Abel as Dr. Benedict
- Onslow Stevens as Dunbar
- Elizabeth Patterson as Maggie
- Edgar Kennedy as Sheriff

== Production ==
The film was based on a bestselling 1939 novel by Medora Field, a writer for the Atlanta Journal Magazine. Field's close friend Margaret Mitchell encouraged her to write the book after Field had urged Mitchell to submit her manuscript for Gone with the Wind to Macmillan in 1935.

Republic Pictures bought the film rights in 1940. Stewart Palmer was assigned to write the script in June 1940. The studio briefly considered renaming the film Belle of Atlanta before settling on the book's original title. The cast and crew were set by late August, with John Hubbard borrowed from Hal Roach. Filming was completed by September.

== Reception ==
The Los Angeles Times called the film "one of those good, old time mystery thrillers."
