= Mysterious Crossing =

1936 film by Arthur Lubin

- Directed by: Arthur Lubin
- Written by: Jefferson Parker; John Grey
- Based on: Murder on the Mississippi by Fred MacIsaac
- Produced by: Val Paul; Charles R. Rogers
- Starring: James Dunn; Jean Rogers; Andy Devine
- Cinematography: Milton R. Krasner
- Edited by: Bernard W. Burton
- Music by: Louis Forbes
- Production company: Universal Pictures
- Distributed by: Universal Pictures
- Release date: December 27, 1936
- Running time: 61 minutes
- Country: United States
- Language: English

Mysterious Crossing is a 1936 American mystery film directed by Arthur Lubin and starring James Dunn, Jean Rogers and Andy Devine. It was produced and distributed by Universal Pictures.

== Plot ==
A travelling newspaper reporter stumbles across the body of a dead man while on a boat crossing the Mississippi River at New Orleans. He takes a lead in the investigation of the murder, falling in love with the dead man's daughter.

== Cast ==
- James Dunn as Addison Francis Murphy
- Jean Rogers as Yvonne Fontaine
- Andy Devine as Carolina
- Hobart Cavanaugh as Ned J. Stebbins
- John Eldredge as Paul Briand
- Herbert Rawlinson as District Attorney Henry R. Charters
- Lorin Raker as Wilson - Copy Writer
- J. Farrell MacDonald as Police Chief Bullock
- Clarence Muse as Lincoln
- Libby Taylor as Hattie
- Eddie 'Rochester' Anderson as Hotel Porter
- Edward Earle as Hotel Manager
- Alphonse Martell as Head Waiter
- Etta McDaniel as Cook
- Pat O'Malley as Sergeant
- Rhea Mitchell as Hotel Floor Clerk
- James Flavin as Plainclothesman

== Production ==
It was originally called Murder on the Mississippi, which was the title of the Fred MacIsaac story on which it was based. Universal bought this in June 1936 as a vehicle for Boris Karloff. Filming started October 1936.

== Reception ==
The New York Times said the film "may not be great art" but "it has a smoothness about it."
