= Newsboys' Home =

1938 film by Harold Young

- Theatrical Poster
- Directed by: Harold Young
- Written by: Gordon Kahn (story and screenplay); Charles Grayson (story)
- Produced by: Ken Goldsmith
- Starring: Little Tough Guys; Jackie Cooper
- Cinematography: Milton R. Krasner; John W. Boyle
- Edited by: Philip Cahn
- Music by: Frank Skinner
- Production company: Universal Pictures
- Distributed by: Universal Pictures
- Release date: December 23, 1938 (United States)
- Running time: 73 minutes
- Country: United States
- Language: English

Newsboys' Home is a 1938 crime film that starred Jackie Cooper and The Little Tough Guys.

== Plot ==
When his father, a small town sheriff, is slain by a big city gangster, "Rifle" Edwards becomes a homeless vagabond, drifting from town to town. Arriving broke and hungry in a large metropolis, he seeks food and shelter at the Newsboys' Home, where the kids force him to fight an amateur bout with the champ, Danny Shay, before he can eat. When Rifle knocks Danny out, the country boy is accepted into the gang of newsies. He goes to work selling the Globe, which is published by Howard Price Dutton, the founder and benefactor of the home. When Dutton dies, his daughter Gwen becomes the new publisher. Globe reporter Perry Warner is in love with Gwen, but they quarrel over her ideas about turning the Globe into a highbrow paper. Perry warns Gwen that she will ruin the paper, but she is stubborn and refuses to listen.

Meanwhile, Tom Davenport, a crooked politician, buys the opposition paper, the Star, in order to swing the election for his candidates, and tries to bribe Perry to work for him. After Perry refuses, Davenport starts a ruthless circulation war, and Globe sales begin to fall off dramatically. Gwen still refuses to heed Perry's advice and abandon her disastrous editorial policies, and in frustration, Perry quits and leaves on a trip. When the Globe can no longer support the Newsboys' Home, Danny and some of the boys go to work for Bartsch on the Star, leaving only Rifle and Sailor behind at the Globe. Perry returns to find the Globe in dire straits and Gwen tearfully refutes her policies. Assuming editorship of the paper, Perry sets out to whip the Star at its own game.

Growing bolder, Davenport hires mobster Francis Barber to escalate the circulation war, and Globe trucks are wrecked, newsstands smashed and burned. The war comes to a climax when a street fight erupts during which boys from the two rival papers meet in open combat, and police squads are required to quell the riot. Angered because one of his pals has been shot by one of Barber's men, Danny goes to Barber to quit his job while Rifle follows the gangsters to Barber, whom he recognizes as his father's killer. Barber and his men are preparing to take Rifle "for a ride" when Danny and the newsboys stage a sensational rescue in which they take Barber prisoner and turn him over to the police. With the newspaper war brought to a close, the Globe regains its popularity and Gwen and Perry are married.

== Cast ==
=== The Little Tough Guys ===
- Harris Berger as Sailor
- Hally Chester as Murphy
- Charles Duncan as Monk
- David Gorcey as Yap
- William Benedict as Trouble

=== Additional cast ===
- Jackie Cooper as "Rifle" Edwards
- Edmund Lowe as Perry Warner
- Wendy Barrie as Gwen Dutton
- Edward Norris as Francis 'Frankie' Barber
- Samuel S. Hinds as Howard Price Dutton
- Irving Pichel as Tom Davenport
- Elisha Cook, Jr. as Danny Shay
- Harry Beresford as O'Dowd
- Horace McMahon as Bartsch
- George McKay as Hartley
