= The First Traveling Saleslady =

1956 film by Arthur Lubin

- Film poster
- Directed by: Arthur Lubin
- Written by: Devery Freeman; Stephen Longstreet
- Produced by: Arthur Lubin
- Starring: Ginger Rogers; Carol Channing; Barry Nelson
- Cinematography: William E. Snyder
- Edited by: Otto Ludwig
- Music by: Irving Gertz
- Production company: Arthur Lubin Productions
- Distributed by: RKO Radio Pictures
- Release date: August 15, 1956
- Running time: 92 minutes
- Country: United States
- Language: English

The First Traveling Saleslady is a 1956 American western comedy film directed by Arthur Lubin and starring Ginger Rogers, Carol Channing and Barry Nelson. Commercially unsuccessful, it was among the films that helped to close the already struggling RKO Pictures. Future western stars Clint Eastwood and James Arness have supporting roles in the film.

== Plot ==
Corset company owner and supporter of women's suffrage Rose Gillray has her wagon struck by a 'horseless carriage' in 1897 New York. This early automobile is driven by Charlie Masters, who tells her it is the transportation of the future.

At work, Rose is helping singer Molly Wade into a boldly designed new corset when she gets the idea that using it for Molly's costume on stage would help to promote sales, but instead the show is shut down by the police.

With her business failing, Rose owes money to Jim Carter, whose steel business manufactures the metal used for a corset's stays. Jim takes a shine to Rose and offers her a chance to sell his barbed wire, which is not selling well out west, where his salesmen get run out of town ... or worse.

She ends up in Kansas City, accompanied by Molly and followed by Charlie. A cattlemen's association convention seems a good place to try to sell the barbed wire. However, cattle rancher Joel Kingdon gives her the runaround, attracted to her personally but warning her against peddling wire. She tries his home state of Texas next, but once again, Joel interferes, putting the women out of business temporarily. Rose eventually disproves the claim that barbed wire injures cattle, but she demonstrates that the cattle are smart enough to avoid impaling themselves, and the sales start rolling in.

Joel and Jim both fall in love with Rose and propose marriage, but she rejects both. Charlie, though, comes along offering a ride to California and marriage, where he wants to explore another new notion: machines that fly.

== Cast ==
- Ginger Rogers as Rose Gillray
- Carol Channing as Molly Wade
- Barry Nelson as Charles Masters
- David Brian as James Carter
- James Arness as Joel Kingdom
- Clint Eastwood as Lt. Rice
- Robert F. Simon as Cal - Texas Rancher
- Frank Wilcox as U.S. Marshal Duncan
- Dan White as Sheriff
- Harry Cheshire as Judge Benson
- Ed Cassidy as Theodore Roosevelt
- John Eldredge as Greavy - Prosecuting Attorney
- Belle Mitchell as Emily
- Lane Chandler as Rancher

== Production ==
The film was based on an original story by Stephen Longstreet. It was Ginger Rogers' first movie at RKO for a number of years. "It's a very cute story", said Rogers. "It's for the whole family and I was delighted to make a family story." The role was originally intended for Mae West and according to an article in the November 8, 1955 issue of The Hollywood Reporter, Betty Grable was set to play Miss Rose Gillray.

The movie marked the film debut for Carol Channing. It was Barry Nelson's first film in five years. Clint Eastwood was under personal contract to producer-director Arthur Lubin, who used him in a number of films. James Arness was under contract to John Wayne and had just established himself in the CBS-TV western Gunsmoke.

The movie was part of a $22 million slate of 11 films announced by RKO for the first half of 1956. Others included Back from Eternity, Beyond a Reasonable Doubt, Stage Struck, Bundle of Joy, A Farewell to Arms, The Syndicate, Cash McCall and Is This Our Son. Ultimately, RKO would only make a few of these films.

Filming took place in January and February 1956.

RKO's head of production, William Dozier, signed Channing to a five-year contract at two films a year. It was to begin with a musical remake of Stage Door but RKO went out of business some time after the contract was signed.

== Reception ==
The film was not a financial success. According to a history of the studio. "the picture quickly faded into oblivion. RKO Teleradio needed a box-office rocket to blast off its first program of movies; instead, it tossed out a fizzling cherry bomb."

== See also ==
- List of American films of 1956
