= Women Must Dress =

1935 film by Reginald Barker

- Directed by: Reginald Barker
- Written by: Dorothy Davenport; Edmund Joseph; Frank Farnsworth
- Produced by: Dorothy Davenport; W. Ray Johnston
- Starring: Minna Gombell; Gavin Gordon; Lenita Lane; Suzanne Kaaren; Hardie Albright; Zeffie Tilbury; Paul Ellis; Arthur Lake; Jon Hall
- Cinematography: Milton R. Krasner
- Edited by: Jack Ogilvie
- Distributed by: Monogram Pictures
- Release date: February 1, 1935
- Country: United States
- Language: English

Women Must Dress is a 1935 American romantic comedy film directed by Reginald Barker and starring Minna Gombell and Gavin Gordon. It was produced and co-written by the former silent film actress Dorothy Davenport, who had been working as a producer since the death of her husband Wallace Reid in 1923. The film was a rare leading role for Gombell, and marked the film debut of Jon Hall, albeit under his birth name Charles Locher.

== Plot ==
Linda Howard discovers that her husband is having an affair and takes their young adult daughter Janet away to start a new life. Linda becomes a successful fashion designer but begins to re-examine her own life choices when Janet forsakes her successful-but-bland doctor boyfriend for a faster, more loose set of companions.

== Production ==
Production likely began in October, 1934. The cast list included, according to The Hollywood Filmograph, "winners of the Monogram Agfa Amsco contest." Filming took ten days on a budget of around $75,000.

== Copyright ==
Copyright has lapsed since the original theatrical run of Women Must Dress, and the film is now in public domain.
