= To the People of the United States =

1943 film by Arthur Lubin

- Directed by: Arthur Lubin
- Written by: Edmund L. Hartmann
- Produced by: United States Public Health Service; Walter Wanger
- Starring: Jean Hersholt
- Narrated by: Jean Hersholt
- Cinematography: Milton Krasner
- Distributed by: War Activities Committee of the Motion Pictures Industry
- Release date: 16 April 1944
- Running time: 21 minutes
- Country: United States
- Language: English

To the People of the United States is a short propaganda film produced by the US Public Health Service in 1943 to warn the American GIs against syphilis. It was directed by Arthur Lubin and produced by Walter Wanger. The film was subject to protests from the Catholic Legion of Decency.

== Plot ==
The full film.

The film opens with the U.S. Army Air Force ground crew of a B-17 Flying Fortress talking to their colleagues about being grounded. It seems the other planes in their unit are off to fight the enemy, but they and their plane lie idle because their pilot is "sick". The pilot, whose face is never shown, talks with a doctor, feeling very embarrassed and guilty about what has happened. The doctor assures him that he will fly again when he gets better. When the pilot interjects that he has heard he wouldn't, the doctor asks "Heard from who? The kid next door or the drug patent salesman? Surely not anyone who knew what he was talking about." The doctor then informs him that if the disease is caught early, and he keeps up a strict treatment he will be able to go about his business normally again.

Once the pilot leaves the doctor addresses the audience "Do you want the facts? Well the first question is the extent of syphilis in America." A visit to the local draft board later reveals that nearly 47 of every thousand men called up have to be dismissed because they have syphilis. He then visits an Army hospital and is informed by the doctor that syphilis is like a "forest fire", no organization or saboteur could do half the damage that venereal disease does to the army.

The doctor then goes into the social stigma associated with syphilis, and the fact that so many people will not get a blood test to check for syphilis. He notes that, in his native Scandinavia, people were much more open about it, and it was a normal sight for people to get a blood test for syphilis. He shows a diagram of Norway, Sweden, and Denmark, which he says has a population comparable to the State of New York, and how fewer Scandinavians have VD than New Yorkers. The film ends with a plea for everyone to get a blood test.

== Cast ==
- Jean Hersholt as Colonel Jensen - Medical Corps.
- Norman T. Kirk, Surgeon General U.S. Army
- Thomas Parran, Surgeon General, U.S. Public Health Service
- Noah Beery Jr. as Bomber Ground Crew
- Joseph Crehan as Doctor at Hospital
- Richard Fraser as Young Doctor
- Thomas Gomez as Compton - Member of the Local Draft Board
- Anne Gwynne as Nurse
- Samuel S. Hinds as Harrison - Member of Local Draft Board
- Arthur Loft as Griffith - Member of the Local Draft Board
- Robert Mitchum as Bomber Ground Crew

== Production ==
The film was made at the request of the Public Health Service and the California State Department of Public Health, using public funds. The director and all the actors volunteered their time for the film and it was shot in November 1943. The intent was for the film to be distributed free by the Public Health Service to the armed services, schools, civic organisations and industrial groups. The film was made with the co operation of the office of the Surgeon General and the script was approved by the army and the Office of War Information.

== Reception ==
Diabolique magazine says the film "is the sort of doco that is easy to laugh at (“syphilis – say it!”) but actually has a fine message: don't be ashamed if you're infected, look to science rather than urban legend, get tested and treated, follow the example of Denmark when it comes to sex education. This is all sensible stuff, and accordingly offended the Catholic Legion of Decency."

== Protests ==
The Catholic Legion of Decency protested the finished film, saying it failed "to stress that promiscuity is the principal cause of venereal disease." The Legion said the film would "pave the way for a flood of pictures by producers who do not hesitate to avail themselves of every opportunity for lurid and pornographic material for financial gain."

Producer Wanger argued that the film did not violate the Production Code section on sex and hygenie as the Code did not apply to government films. He said the Code did apply to commercial pictures and would ensure any commercial film did not promote promiscuity. However the protests worked and on March 30, 1944, the Public Health Service withdrew its sponsorship of the film.

On April 16, the California Department of Health made the film available for public showing.

Catholics continued to protest the movie.

== Awards ==
The film was nominated for an Academy Award for Best Documentary Short.
