= Ann Blyth =

American actress (1927–2026)

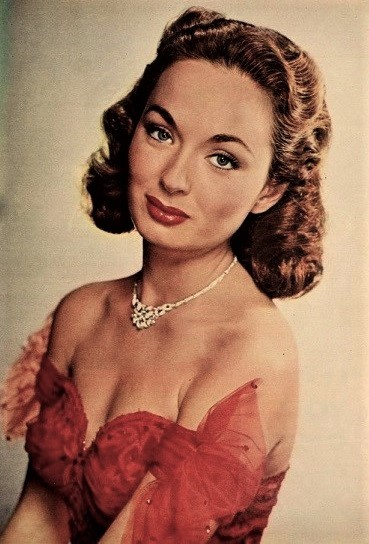
- Blyth in 1952
- Born: Anne Marie Blythe; August 16, 1927; Mount Kisco, New York, U.S.
- Died: June 24, 2026 (aged 98); Rancho Santa Fe, California, U.S.
- Occupations: Actress; singer
- Years active: 1933–1985
- Known for: Mildred Pierce
- Spouse: James McNulty (m. 1953; died 2007)
- Children: 5
- Family: Dennis Day (brother-in-law)

Anne Marie Blythe (August 16, 1927 – June 24, 2026), known professionally as Ann Blyth, was an American actress and singer whose career spanned five decades. She began her career in radio as a child before transitioning to Broadway, where she appeared in Lillian Hellman's Watch on the Rhine (1941–42). Blyth signed with Universal Studios in the 1940s and made her film debut in Chip Off the Old Block (1944), followed by a series of musical comedies. Her breakout role came in Mildred Pierce (1945), where she appeared opposite Joan Crawford, as the scheming Veda Pierce, earning a nomination for the Academy Award for Best Supporting Actress.

Blyth worked extensively in film throughout the 1940s and 1950s, appearing in notable films such as Brute Force (1947) and Mr. Peabody and the Mermaid (1948). She later signed with Metro-Goldwyn-Mayer, where she appeared in musicals and other studio productions, including The Great Caruso (1951), The Student's Prince (1954), and The King's Thief (1955). Her final film role was in The Helen Morgan Story (1957).

After transitioning to theater and television in the late 1950s, she starred in productions such as The King and I and appeared on shows like The Twilight Zone and Murder, She Wrote. Blyth retired from acting in 1985. At the time of her death, Blyth was the earliest surviving Academy Award nominee, and one of the last surviving stars of the Golden Age of Hollywood.

== Early life ==
Anne Marie Blythe (she later dropped the "e" from her first and last names) was born in Mount Kisco, New York, on August 16, 1927 to Harry Blythe and Annie "Nan" (née Lynch) Blythe. After her father left the family, Anne, her elder sister Dorothy, and their mother moved to a walk-up apartment on East 31st Street in New York City, where her mother took up ironing to support her daughters during the Great Depression era.

== Career ==
=== Watch on the Rhine ===
Blyth performed on children's radio shows in New York for six years, making her first appearance when she was five. When she was nine, she joined the New York Children's Opera Company.

Blyth's first acting role was on Broadway in Lillian Hellman's Watch on the Rhine (1941–42). She played the part of Paul Lukas's daughter, Babette. The play ran for 378 performances and won the New York Drama Critics' Circle Award. After the New York run, the play went on tour, and while performing at the Biltmore Theatre Los Angeles, Blyth was offered a contract with Universal Studios.

=== Universal ===
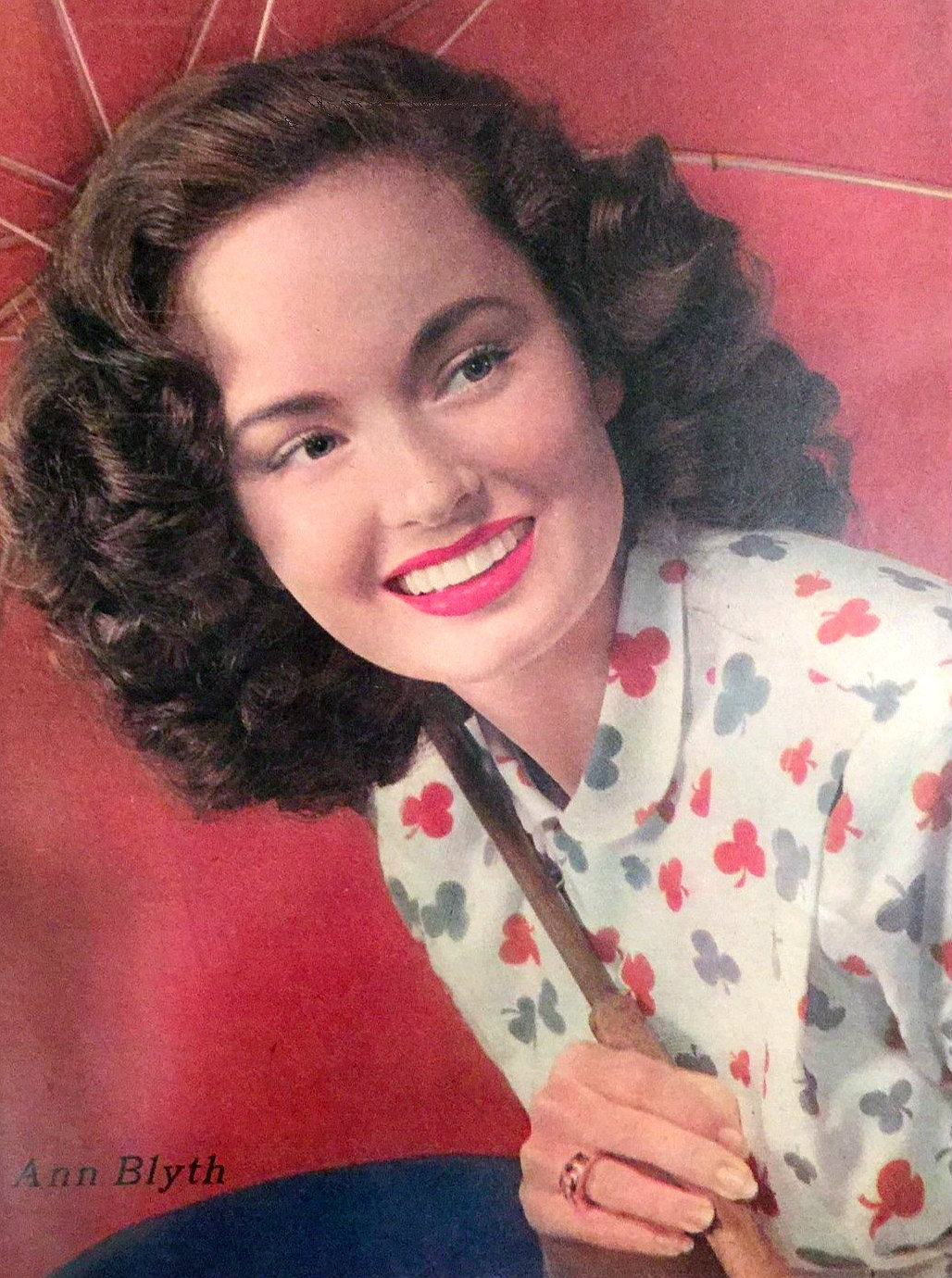
Blyth in 1948

Blyth began her acting career initially as "Anne Blyth", but changed the spelling of her first name to "Ann" at the beginning of her film career. She made her film debut in 1944, teamed with Donald O'Connor and Peggy Ryan in the teenager musical Chip Off the Old Block (1944). She followed it with two similar films: The Merry Monahans (1944), with O'Connor and Ryan again, and Babes on Swing Street (1944) with Ryan. She had a supporting role in the bigger-budgeted Bowery to Broadway (1944), a showcase of Universal musical talent.

On loan to Warner Bros., Blyth was cast "against type" as Veda Pierce, the scheming, ungrateful daughter of Joan Crawford in Mildred Pierce (1945). Her dramatic portrayal won her outstanding reviews, and she received a nomination for an Academy Award for Best Supporting Actress. Blyth was only 16 when she made the Michael Curtiz film. (Crawford won the Best Actress award.)

After Mildred Pierce, Blyth sustained a broken back while tobogganing in Snow Valley in the Southern California mountains and was not able to fully capitalize on the film's success.

She recovered and made two films for Mark Hellinger's unit at Universal: Swell Guy (1946), with Sonny Tufts, and Jules Dassin's Brute Force (1947), with Burt Lancaster. Universal lent her to MGM to play the female lead in Killer McCoy (1947), a boxing film with Mickey Rooney that was a box-office hit.

Back at Universal, Blyth did a film noir with Charles Boyer and Jessica Tandy, A Woman's Vengeance (1948), affecting a British accent. She was then cast in the part of Regina Hubbard in Lillian Hellman's Another Part of the Forest (1948), an adaptation of the 1946 play wherein Regina had been played by Patricia Neal. The play was a prequel to The Little Foxes. Blyth followed it with Mr. Peabody and the Mermaid (1948) with William Powell. She was top-billed in Red Canyon (1949), a Western with Howard Duff.

Universal lent Blyth to Paramount Pictures to play the female lead in Top o' the Morning (1949), as Barry Fitzgerald's daughter, who is romanced by Bing Crosby. Back at Universal, she was teamed with Robert Montgomery in Once More, My Darling (1949), meaning she had to drop out of Desert Legion. She did a comedy with Robert Cummings: Free for All (1949). In April 1949, Universal suspended her for refusing a lead role in the baby adoption ring crime noir Abandoned; Gale Storm played it.

Universal lent her to Samuel Goldwyn Productions to star opposite Farley Granger in Our Very Own (1950). Universal gave her top billing in a romantic comedy, Katie Did It (1951). Blyth was borrowed by MGM for The Great Caruso (1951) opposite Mario Lanza, which was a massive box-office hit. Back at Universal, she made Thunder on the Hill (1951) with Claudette Colbert and had the female lead in The Golden Horde (1951) with David Farrar. 20th Century Fox borrowed her to star opposite Tyrone Power in I'll Never Forget You (1952), a last-minute replacement for Constance Smith. She appeared on TV in Family Theater in an episode called "The World's Greatest Mother" alongside Ethel Barrymore.

Universal teamed Blyth with Gregory Peck in The World in His Arms (1952). She was top billed in the comedy Sally and Saint Anne (1952) and was borrowed by RKO for One Minute to Zero (1952), a Korean War drama with Robert Mitchum, wherein she replaced Claudette Colbert, who came down with pneumonia.

=== Metro-Goldwyn-Mayer ===
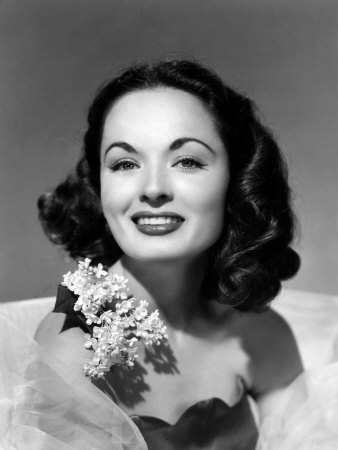
Blyth in 1952

Metro-Goldwyn-Mayer had been interested in Blyth since she worked at the studio on The Great Caruso. In December 1952, she left Universal and signed a long-term contract with MGM. She was the leading lady in All the Brothers Were Valiant (1953) with Stewart Granger and Robert Taylor, stepping in for Elizabeth Taylor, who had to drop out due to pregnancy.

On television, Blyth appeared in The Lux Video Theatre version of A Place in the Sun with John Derek and Marilyn Erskine. Back at MGM, Blyth had the lead in the remake of Rose Marie (1954) with Howard Keel, which earned over $5 million, but lost money due to high costs. Plans to remake other MacDonald-Eddy films (such as The Girl of the Golden West) were discussed, but did not occur.

Blyth was meant to be reteamed with Lanza in The Student Prince (1954), but he was fired from the studio and replaced in the picture by Edmund Purdom; the film did well at the box office. Blyth and Purdom were reunited in a swashbuckler, The King's Thief (1955), with David Niven. She was teamed again with Keel on the musical Kismet (1955); despite strong reviews, the film was a financial flop. She was named as the female lead in The Adventures of Quentin Durward (1955), but Kay Kendall was cast in the film, instead. For her final picture at the studio, MGM put Blyth in Slander (1957) opposite Van Johnson.

=== Final features ===
Sidney Sheldon cast Blyth in The Buster Keaton Story (1957) with O'Connor at Paramount. Warner Bros. then cast her in the title role of The Helen Morgan Story (1957) directed by Michael Curtiz with Paul Newman. Blyth reportedly beat out 40 other actresses for the part. Though her voice was more like the original Helen Morgan, her vocals were dubbed by Gogi Grant. The soundtrack was much more successful than the film itself. Blyth made no further films.

In 1957, Blyth sued Benedict Bogeaus for $75,000 for not making the film Conquest.

=== Theatre and television ===
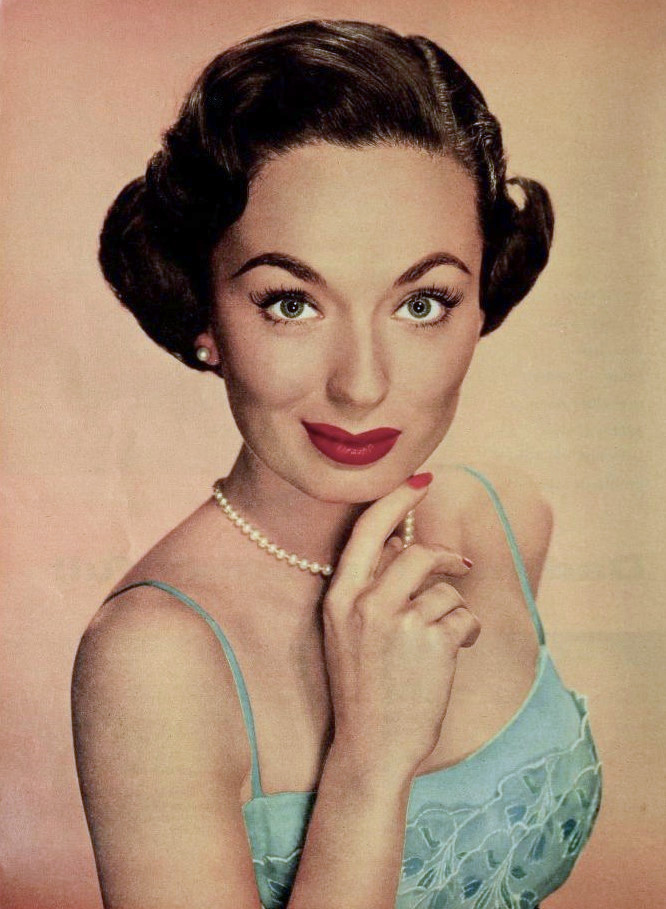
Blyth in August 1954 for Modern Screen Magazine

From the late 1950s into the 1970s, Blyth worked in musical theater and summer stock, starring in the shows The King and I, The Sound of Music, and Show Boat. She also appeared sporadically on television, including co-starring opposite James Donald in the 1960 adaptation of A.J. Cronin's novel, The Citadel.

Blyth guest-starred on episodes of The DuPont Show with June Allyson, The Dick Powell Theatre, Saints and Sinners, Wagon Train (several episodes), The Twilight Zone ("Queen of the Nile"), Burke's Law, Kraft Suspense Theatre, Insight, and The Name of the Game. Several of these appearances were for Four Star Television, with whom Blyth signed a multiple-appearance contract. In the 1970s, Blyth appeared as herself, alongside her children, in a series of television commercials for Hostess snack cakes.

Blyth's last television appearances were in episodes of Switch and Quincy, M.E. in 1983 and Murder, She Wrote in 1985. She then officially retired.

For her contributions to the film industry, Blyth has a motion picture star on the Hollywood Walk of Fame at 6733 Hollywood Boulevard.

=== Live performance ===
Blyth performed live in concert tours for many years with Harper MacKay serving as her accompanist and music director.

== Personal life and death ==
In 1953, Blyth married obstetrician James McNulty, brother of singer Dennis Day, who had introduced them. The bridesmaids were actresses Joan Leslie, Jane Withers, and Betty Lynn. The couple received a special commendation from Pope Pius XII. After her marriage, Blyth took a hiatus from her career to focus on raising their five children: Timothy, Maureen, Kathleen, Terence, and Eileen. They later had ten grandchildren. McNulty died in La Jolla, California in 2007, at the age of 89.

In 1955, an armed man who had written her fan letters was arrested near her house.

She was a lifelong Republican. Throughout her career and subsequent retirement, Blyth was a staunch, lifelong conservative. She consistently backed the Republican presidential ticket, beginning with her support for New York Governor Thomas E. Dewey in 1948, followed by Dwight D. Eisenhower in 1952 and 1956, and Richard Nixon in 1960. In 1964, she supported the campaign of Barry Goldwater. She maintained an unbroken sequence of backing subsequent Republican nominees over the next several decades, including Gerald Ford, Ronald Reagan, George H.W. Bush, and George W. Bush. Into the 21st century, her alignment continued with her backing of John McCain in 2008, a planned primary endorsement of Rick Santorum during the 2012 cycle, and general election support for Mitt Romney and Donald Trump through the 2016, 2020, and 2024 campaigns.

Unlike many of her contemporaries whose political involvement waned after the Golden Age of Hollywood, Blyth maintained an active party presence in her community for decades. She was an active participant and long-term member of several highly influential conservative organizations based in Southern California, including the Hollywood Republican Committee and The Bel-Air Republican Women's Group. Within these circles, she consistently collaborated with fellow conservative men and women to support grassroots campaigns, frequently appearing at political galas, civic functions, formal luncheons, and fundraising dinners to promote party initiatives. Furthermore, during the height of her cinematic career, she aligned herself with the Motion Picture Alliance for the Preservation of American Ideals, a prominent industry watchdog collective dedicated to upholding traditional constitutional values and defending the American entertainment industry against perceived subversive political influences.

Blyth balanced her political convictions with a lifelong dedication to humanitarian causes, religious devotion, and community volunteerism. Throughout her life, she consistently volunteered her time, talent, and resources to Right to Life advocacy groups, and partnered with Catholic Charities and Family Theater Productions to blend her entertainment background with faith-based outreach. Additionally, she directed much of her private philanthropy and volunteer efforts toward supporting academic institutions, local school networks, and specialized initiatives benefiting special needs children. In her retirement, she also remained an active financial benefactor and advocate for St. Ignatius in Philadelphia, supporting the parish's localized community welfare programs.

Blyth died at her home in Rancho Santa Fe, California on June 24, 2026, at the age of 98. She was interred at Holy Cross Cemetery in Culver City, California, beside her husband.

== Honors ==
In 1973, she and McNulty, both Roman Catholics were accorded the honorific rank of Lady and Knight of the Holy Sepulchre in a ceremony presided over by Cardinal Cooke.

== Filmography ==
Film

Year	Title	Role	Notes
1944	Chip Off the Old Block	Glory Marlow III	
1944	The Merry Monahans	Sheila DeRoyce	
1944	Babes on Swing Street	Carol Curtis	
1944	Bowery to Broadway	Bessie Jo Kirby	
1945	Mildred Pierce	Veda Pierce Forrester	Nominated - Academy Award for Best Supporting Actress
1946	Swell Guy	Marian Tyler	
1947	Brute Force	Ruth	
1947	Killer McCoy	Sheila Carrson	
1948	A Woman's Vengeance	Doris Mead	Alternative title: The Gioconda Smile
1948	Another Part of the Forest	Regina Hubbard	
1948	Mr. Peabody and the Mermaid	Lenore the Mermaid	
1949	Red Canyon	Lucy Bostel	
1949	Top o' the Morning	Conn McNaughton	
1949	Once More, My Darling	Marita Connell	
1949	Free for All	Ann Abbott	
1950	Our Very Own	Gail Macaulay	
1951	Katie Did It	Katherine Standish	
1951	The Great Caruso	Dorothy Park Benjamin	
1951	Thunder on the Hill	Valerie Carns	Alternative title: Bonaventure
1951	I'll Never Forget You	Helen Pettigrew / Martha Forsyth	Alternative titles: The House in the Square (USA); Man of Two Worlds
1951	The Golden Horde	Princess Shalimar	Alternative title: The Golden Horde of Genghis Khan
1952	The World in His Arms	Countess Marina Selanova	
1952	Sally and Saint Anne	Sally O'Moyne	
1952	One Minute to Zero	Mrs. Landa Day	
1953	All the Brothers Were Valiant	Priscilla "Pris" Holt	
1954	Rose Marie	Rose Marie Lemaitre	
1954	The Student Prince	Kathie Ruder	
1955	The King's Thief	Lady Mary	
1955	Kismet	Marsinah	
1957	Slander	Connie Martin	
1957	The Buster Keaton Story	Gloria Brent	
1957	The Helen Morgan Story	Helen Morgan	Alternative titles are Both Ends of the Candle and Why Was I Born? Vocals dubbed by Gogi Grant

Television

Year	Title	Role	Notes
1954	Lux Video Theatre	Angela	Episode: "A Place in the Sun"
1958–1963	The Christophers		2 episodes
1959	The DuPont Show with June Allyson	Martha	Episode: "Suspected"
1959–1963	Wagon Train	Nancy Winters / Eve Newhope / Clementine Jones / Martha Barham / Jenny / Phoebe Tannen	5 episodes
1960	The Citadel	Christine	Television movie
1962	The Dick Powell Show	Lizzie Hogan	Episode: "Savage Sunday"
1963	Saints and Sinners	Edith Berlitz	Episode: "The Year Joan Crawford Won the Oscar"
1964	The Twilight Zone	Pamela Morris / Constance Taylor	Episode: "Queen of the Nile"
1964–1965	Burke's Law	Deidre DeMara; Valerie	2 episodes
1965	Kraft Suspense Theatre	Lady Mei	Episode: "Jungle of Fear"
1969	The Name of the Game	Kay Martin	Episode: "Swingers Only"
1975	Switch	Miriam Estabrook	Episode: "Mistresses, Murder and Millions"
1979–1983	Quincy, M.E.	Velma Whitehead; Dorothy Blake	2 episodes
1985	Murder, She Wrote	Francesca Lodge	Episode: "Reflections of the Mind" (final appearance)

== Radio appearances ==
Year	Program	Episode/source
1948	Lux Radio Theatre	A Woman's Vengeance
1948	Suspense	Muddy Track
1952	Family Theater	The Presentation
1952	Lux Radio Theatre	Top o' the Morning
1953	Family Theater	The Finding in the Temple

== Awards and honors ==
Year	Organization	Category	Film	Result	Ref.
1946	Academy Award	Best Supporting Actress	Mildred Pierce	Nominated	
1958	Laurel Awards	Top Female Musical Performance	The Helen Morgan Story	Nominated	
1960	Hollywood Walk of Fame	Star - Motion Pictures	—N/a	Honored	
2003	Women's International Center	Living Legacy Award	—N/a	Honored	

== See also ==
- List of actors with Academy Award nominations
- List of actors with Hollywood Walk of Fame motion picture stars
