= Mr. Peabody and the Mermaid =

1948 film by Irving Pichel

- Theatrical film poster
- Directed by: Irving Pichel
- Screenplay by: Nunnally Johnson
- Based on: Peabody's Mermaid; 1946 novel by Guy Pearce Jones and Constance Bridges Jones
- Produced by: Nunnally Johnson; Gene Fowler Jr. (associate producer)
- Starring: William Powell; Ann Blyth
- Cinematography: Russell Metty
- Edited by: Marjorie Fowler
- Music by: Robert Emmet Dolan
- Production company: Nunnaly Johnson Productions
- Distributed by: Universal-International Pictures
- Release date: August 11, 1948 (U.S.)
- Running time: 89 minutes
- Country: United States
- Language: English

Mr. Peabody and the Mermaid is a 1948 American romantic fantasy film directed by Irving Pichel and starring William Powell and Ann Blyth in the title roles. The film was based on the 1945 novel Peabody's Mermaid by Guy and Constance Jones. Sequences were shot at the Weeki Wachee Springs in Florida; Blyth's swimming doubles were Nancy Tribble and Mary Ann Ziegler.

== Plot ==
Much of the story is shown in flashback as Arthur Peabody tells a skeptical doctor about the source of his malaise.

After a bad bout of influenza, Peabody had gone on vacation with his wife Polly to the fictional Caribbean resort of St Hilda. While there, he hears singing coming from a rocky cay offshore and sails his boat to investigate and do a little fishing. To his embarrassment, he reels in a beautiful mermaid whom he names Lenore. Although mute, she is mischievous and childlike and more than a little alluring – so much so that before long Peabody has taught her to kiss. Meanwhile, he hides Lenore in the resort's deep fish pond.

Confusion ensues as Peabody's wife Polly, who is herself attracted to suave Englishman Major Hadley, suspects her husband of infidelity with a vacationing singer. Things get more complicated after Polly storms off home without Peabody and police suspect him of murder. A search party pursues him to the cay, where Lenore nearly drowns Peabody by trying to conceal him underwater.

Back at home in Boston, as snow is falling, Peabody is talked into consulting Dr. Harvey and telling his story. In the end, Peabody seems to be persuaded by the doctor that he was hallucinating while undergoing a midlife crisis on the approach of his 50th birthday. Only Lenore's comb is left to prove the reality of his adventure, and this he gives to his wife as a homecoming gift.

== Cast ==
- William Powell as Mr. Arthur Peabody
- Ann Blyth as Mermaid
- Irene Hervey as Mrs. Polly Peabody
- Andrea King as Cathy Livingston
- Clinton Sundberg as Mike Fitzgerald
- Art Smith as Dr. Harvey
- Hugh French as Major Hadley
- Lumsden Hare as Col. Mandrake
- Frederick Clarke as Basil
- James Logan as Lieutenant
- Mary Field as Wee Shop Clerk
- Beatrice Roberts as Mother
- Cynthia Corley as Nurse
- Tom Stevenson as Charlie - Waiter
- Mary Somerville as Lady Trebshaw
- Dick Ryan Waiter (as Richard Ryan)
- Robert Hyatt as Little Boy (Bobby Hyatt)
- Ivan Browning as Sidney (as Ivan H. Browning)

== Home media ==
The film was initially released by on DVD by ATI Corp, and was re-released by Olive Films (under license from Paramount Home Media Distribution) on DVD and Blu-ray on July 8, 2014.

== See also ==
- Mermaids in popular culture
