= Sally and Saint Anne =

1952 film by Rudolph Maté

- Directed by: Rudolph Maté
- Written by: James O'Hanlon; Herb Meadow
- Produced by: Leonard Goldstein; Anton Leader
- Starring: Ann Blyth; Edmund Gwenn; John McIntire
- Cinematography: Irving Glassberg
- Edited by: Edward Curtiss
- Music by: Frank Skinner
- Production company: Universal Pictures
- Distributed by: Universal Pictures
- Release date: July 16, 1952
- Running time: 90 minutes
- Country: United States
- Language: English

Sally and Saint Anne is a 1952 American comedy film directed by Rudolph Maté and starring Ann Blyth, Edmund Gwenn and John McIntire.

== Plot ==
Sally O’Moyne is a schoolgirl who lives with three generations of an eccentric Irish family, including her Grandpa Pat Ryan, who pretends to be close to death. One day at school she can't find her lunch pail so she prays to Saint Anne, asking for her intercession. When her lunch pail is returned to her, Sally begins to believe Saint Anne is performing miracles for her, and her neighbors ask her to pray to the saint for their requests. A few years later land-grabbing Alderman McCarthy wants the O’Moyne's off of their property, and Sally turns to Saint Anne to help them keep their house.

== Cast ==
- Ann Blyth as Sally O'Moyne
- Edmund Gwenn as Grandpa Pat Ryan
- John McIntire as Alderman Percival Xavier 'Goldtooth' McCarthy
- Gregg Palmer as Johnny Evans
- Hugh O'Brian as Danny O'Moyne
- Jack Kelly as Mike O'Moyne
- Frances Bavier as Mrs. Kitty 'Mom' O'Moyne
- Otto Hulett as Pop O'Moyne
- Kathleen Hughes as Lois Foran
- George Mathews as Father Kennedy
- Lamont Johnson as Willie O'Moyne
- King Donovan as Hymie Callahan, Trainer
