= There's a Girl in My Heart =

1949 American film

- Directed by: Arthur Dreifuss
- Written by: Arthur Hoerl and John Eugene Hasty (story and screenplay); McElbert Moore (additional dialogue)
- Produced by: Arthur Dreifuss
- Starring: Lee Bowman; Elyse Knox; Gloria Jean; Peggy Ryan; Ludwig Donath; Ray McDonald; Joel Marston; Irene Ryan; Lon Chaney
- Cinematography: Philip Tannura
- Edited by: Richard C. Currier
- Music by: Herschel Burke Gilbert
- Production company: Sandre Productions
- Distributed by: Allied Artists Pictures Corporation
- Release date: December 19, 1949
- Running time: 79 minutes
- Country: United States
- Language: English

There's a Girl in My Heart is a 1949 American musical comedy film directed by Arthur Dreifuss, starring Lee Bowman, Elyse Knox, Gloria Jean and Peggy Ryan. It was released by Allied Artists Pictures Corporation with many former contract stars from Universal Pictures.

Filming started 25 July 1949.

== Cast ==
- Lee Bowman as Terrence Dowd
- Elyse Knox as Claire Adamson
- Gloria Jean as Ruth Kroner
- Peggy Ryan as Sally Mullin
- Ludwig Donath as Prof. Joseph Kroner
- Ray McDonald as Danny Kroner
- Joel Marston as Dr. Henlein
- Richard Lane as Sgt. Mullin
- Irene Ryan as Mrs. Mullin
- Lanny Simpson as Lennie Dowd
- Paul Guilfoyle as Father Callaghan
- Iris Adrian as Lulu Troy
- Kay Anne Nelson as Carol Anne
- Lon Chaney as Johnny Colton

Uncredited

- Martin Garralaga as Luigi
- Lee Tung Foo as Charlie Li
- Robert Emmett Keane as Capt. Blake

== Reception ==
The Los Angeles Times said it was "Full of jingly merry singing and dancing."
