= The Merry Monahans =

1944 film by Charles Lamont

- Lobby card
- Directed by: Charles Lamont
- Screenplay by: Michael Fessier; Ernest Pagano
- Produced by: Michael Fessier; Ernest Pagano
- Starring: Donald O'Connor; Peggy Ryan; Jack Oakie
- Cinematography: Charles Van Enger
- Edited by: Charles Maynard
- Music by: Hans J. Salter
- Production company: Universal Pictures
- Distributed by: Universal Pictures
- Release date: September 15, 1944
- Running time: 91 minutes
- Country: United States
- Language: English

The Merry Monahans is a 1944 American comedy-drama musical film directed by Charles Lamont and starring Donald O'Connor, Peggy Ryan and Jack Oakie.

The story is of a vaudeville family trying to make money through hard times. The film features the great song and dance duet with O'Connor and Ryan, "I Hate To Lose You". Film composer Hans J. Salter was nominated for an Academy Award for his score.

== Plot ==
Talented vaudeville family the Monahans have one very big problem in the form of patriarch Pete, that his heavy alcoholism has gotten the performing clan blacklisted from nearly every significant venue. With little choice but to break away from Pete, his children, Jimmy and Patsy, devise their own act and take it on the road. The troupe enjoys some success, which motivates Pete to sober up. Hearing of their father's turnaround, they make plans to reunite.

== Cast ==
- Donald O'Connor as Jimmy Monahan
- Peggy Ryan as Patsy Monahan
- Jack Oakie as Pete Monahan
- Ann Blyth as Sheila DeRoyce
- Rosemary DeCamp as Lillian Miles, aka Lillian DeRoyce
- John Miljan as Arnold Pembroke, Has-Been Matinee Idol
- Gavin Muir as Weldon Laydon, Broadway Talent Scout
- Isabel Jewell as Rose, aka Rose Monahan, unscrupulous Chorus Girl
- Ian Wolfe as Clerk
- Robert Homans as Policeman
- Marion Martin as Soubrette
- Lloyd Ingraham as Judge

== See also ==
- List of American films of 1944
