= Shamrock Hill (film) =

American musical film

- Directed by: Arthur Dreifuss
- Written by: Arthur Hoerl; McElbert Moore
- Produced by: Arthur Dreifuss; Joseph Levinson; Lincoln A. Widder
- Starring: Peggy Ryan; Ray McDonald; Trudy Marshall
- Cinematography: Philip Tannura
- Edited by: Arthur A. Brooks
- Music by: Herschel Burke Gilbert
- Production company: Vinson Pictures
- Distributed by: Eagle-Lion Films
- Release date: February 1949
- Running time: 70 minutes
- Country: United States
- Language: English

Shamrock Hill is a 1949 American musical comedy film directed by Arthur Dreifuss, starring Peggy Ryan, Ray McDonald and Trudy Marshall.

The film's sets were designed by the art director Charles D. Hall.

== Cast ==
- Peggy Ryan as Eileen Rogan
- Ray McDonald as Larry Hadden
- Trudy Marshall as Carol Judson
- Rick Vallin as Oliver Matthews
- John Litel as Ralph Judson
- Mary Gordon as Grandma Rogan
- Tim Ryan as Uncle
- James Burke as Michael Rogan
- Lanny Simpson as Joey Rogan
- Douglas Wood as Judge Mayer
- Patsy Bolton as Patsy
- Barbara Brier as Doris
- Tim Graham as Officer Merrick

== Bibliography ==
- David Bordwell. Reinventing Hollywood: How 1940s Filmmakers Changed Movie Storytelling. University of Chicago Press, 2017.
