= Michael Fessier =

American screenwriter

- Born: November 6, 1905; Angels Camp, California, United States
- Died: September 19, 1988 (aged 82); Northridge, California, United States
- Occupations: Writer, Producer
- Years active: 1935–1969 (film & TV)

Michael Fessier (1905–1988) was an American screenwriter and film producer. He worked for Hollywood studios such as MGM and Universal Pictures. Later in his career he worked in television. He also wrote short stories and novels, two of which were adapted for the screen. He was married to the actress Lilian Bond.

== Selected filmography ==
- Society Doctor (1935)
- Exclusive Story (1936)
- Women Are Trouble (1936)
- All American Chump (1936)
- Speed (1936)
- Song of the City (1937)
- The Women Men Marry (1937)
- Valley of the Giants (1938)
- The Angels Wash Their Faces (1939)
- Wings of the Navy (1939)
- Espionage Agent (1939)
- He Stayed for Breakfast (1940)
- It All Came True (1940)
- Knockout (1941)
- You'll Never Get Rich (1941)
- You Were Never Lovelier (1942)
- Fired Wife (1943)
- Her Primitive Man (1944)
- The Merry Monahans (1944)
- San Diego, I Love You (1944)
- Greenwich Village (1944)
- Frontier Gal (1945)
- That's the Spirit (1945)
- That Night with You (1945)
- Lover Come Back (1946)
- Slave Girl (1947)
- Red Garters (1954)
- The Boy from Oklahoma (1954)

== Bibliography ==
- Goble, Alan. The Complete Index to Literary Sources in Film. Walter de Gruyter, 1999.
