= Ray McDonald (dancer) =

American dancer

Ray McDonald (June 27, 1920 – February 20, 1959) was a tap dancer who started his career as a vaudeville act with his older sister Grace McDonald, before being cast in a hit Broadway show, and then in films. He had a starring role in the films Down in San Diego and Born to Sing, some leading roles in other films, as well as lesser roles including in uncredited dance sequences.

McDonald's Broadway credits include Park Avenue (1946), Winged Victory (1943), Crazy With the Heat (1941), and Babes in Arms (1937).

== Personal life ==
McDonald was born in New York City. His sister Grace was two years older. She was contracted to Universal while he signed with MGM.

He was married to actress Elisabeth Fraser from 1944 until 1952 and then actress Peggy Ryan from 1953 until 1957. In 1949, he appeared with her in There's a Girl in My Heart and co-starred with her in the musical Shamrock Hill. On December 4, 1956, they guest starred on the Mickey Mouse Club.

He died in 1959 at age 38 in New York City after choking on food in his hotel room.

== Filmography ==
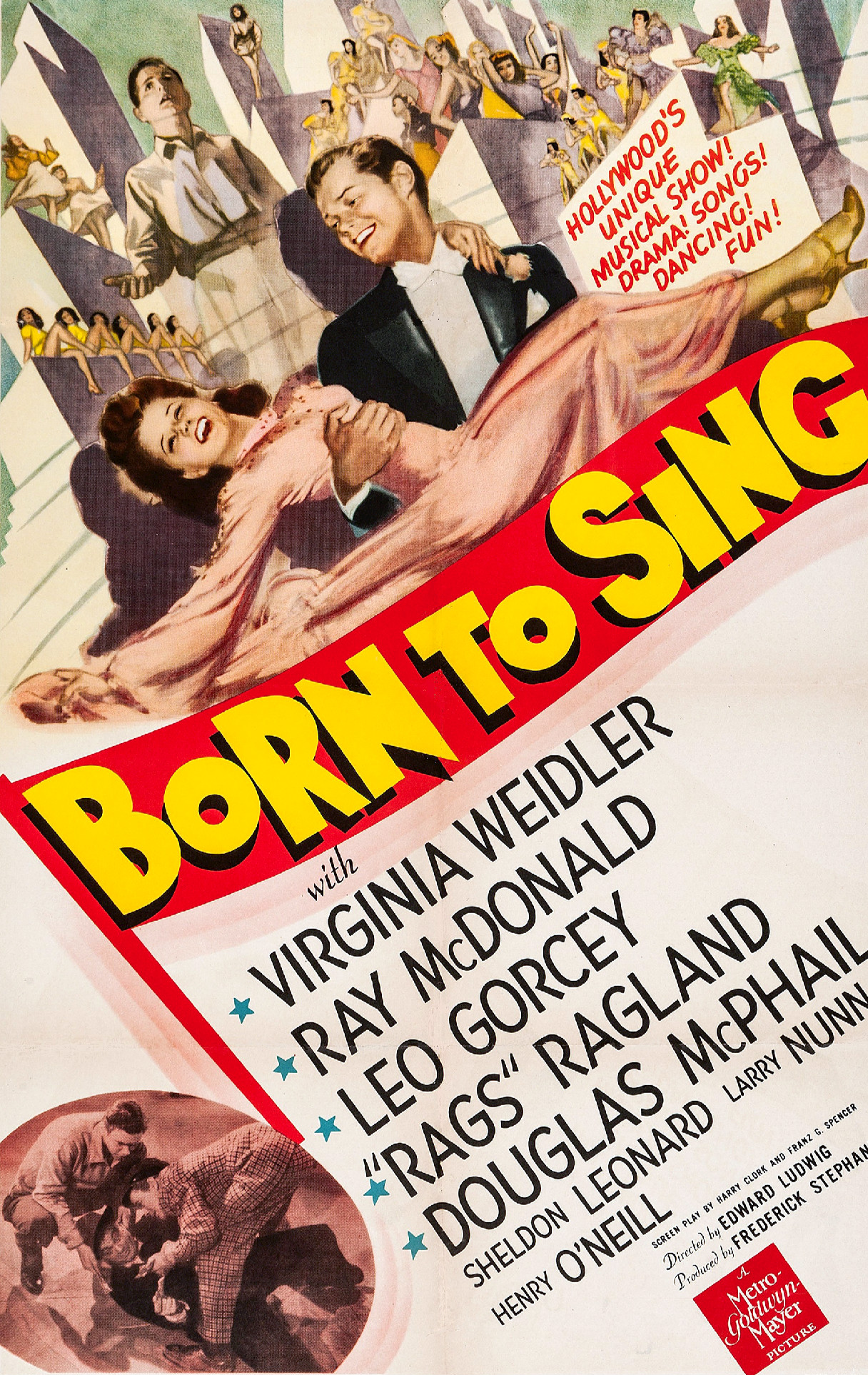
Born to Sing poster

Year	Title	Role	Notes
1941	Life Begins for Andy Hardy	Jimmy Frobisher	
1941	Down in San Diego	Hank Parker	
1941	Babes on Broadway	Ray Lambert	
1942	Born to Sing	Steve	
1943	Presenting Lily Mars	Charlie Potter	
1944	Winged Victory	Flyer – Dance Specialty	Uncredited
1946	Till the Clouds Roll By	Dance Specialty	(segment: "Leave It to Jane")
1947	Good News	Bobby Turner	
1948	Whiplash	Second	Uncredited
1949	Shamrock Hill	Larry Hadden	
1949	Flame of Youth	Bill Crawford	
1949	There's a Girl in My Heart	Danny Kroner	
1951	Inside Straight	Minor Role	Uncredited
1953	All Ashore	Skip Edwards	
