= That's the Spirit (1945 film) =

1945 comedy film

- Theatrical release poster
- Directed by: Charles Lamont
- Screenplay by: Michael Fessier; Ernest Pagano
- Produced by: Michael Fessier; Ernest Pagano
- Starring: Peggy Ryan; Jack Oakie; June Vincent; Gene Lockhart; Johnny Coy; Andy Devine; Arthur Treacher; Irene Ryan; Buster Keaton
- Cinematography: Charles Van Enger
- Edited by: Fred R. Feitshans Jr.
- Music by: Hans J. Salter
- Production company: Universal Pictures
- Distributed by: Universal Pictures
- Release date: June 1, 1945
- Running time: 93 minutes
- Country: United States
- Language: English

That's the Spirit is a 1945 American comedy film directed by Charles Lamont and written by Michael Fessier and Ernest Pagano. The film stars Peggy Ryan, Jack Oakie, June Vincent, Gene Lockhart, Johnny Coy, Andy Devine, Arthur Treacher, Irene Ryan and Buster Keaton. The film was released on June 1, 1945, by Universal Pictures.

== Plot ==
A vaudevillian returns from the dead to help his wife and daughter, who are being dominated by a greedy banker.

== Cast ==
- Peggy Ryan as Sheila Gogarty
- Jack Oakie as Steve "Slim" Gogarty
- June Vincent as Libby Cawthorne Gogarty
- Gene Lockhart as Jasper Cawthorne
- Johnny Coy as Martin Wilde Jr.
- Andy Devine as Martin Wilde Sr.
- Arthur Treacher as Masters
- Irene Ryan as Bilson
- Buster Keaton as L.M.
- Victoria Horne as Patience
- Edith Barrett as Abigail
- Rex Storey as Specialty

== See also ==
- List of films about angels
