= Down in San Diego =

1941 film by Robert B. Sinclair

- Theatrical release poster
- Directed by: Robert B. Sinclair
- Screenplay by: Franz Schulz; Harry Clork
- Story by: Franz Schulz
- Produced by: Frederick Stephani
- Starring: Bonita Granville; Ray McDonald; Dan Dailey; Leo Gorcey; Henry O'Neill; Stanley Clements
- Cinematography: Paul C. Vogel
- Edited by: Ben Lewis
- Music by: David Snell
- Production company: Metro-Goldwyn-Mayer
- Distributed by: Loew's Inc.
- Release date: July 30, 1941
- Running time: 70 minutes
- Country: United States
- Language: English

Down in San Diego is a 1941 American adventure film directed by Robert B. Sinclair and written by Franz Schulz and Harry Clork. The black-and-white movie was filmed in San Diego and stars Bonita Granville, Ray McDonald, Dan Dailey, Leo Gorcey, Henry O'Neill and Stanley Clements. The film was released on July 30, 1941, by Metro-Goldwyn-Mayer.

== Plot ==
Hank Parker is turned down by the U.S. Marine Corps for being too young, but his girlfriend Betty's older brother Al Haines is not. Al, however, is blackmailed by former criminal associates, framed for the murder of a man named Matt Herman if he refuses to spy for the crooks, who will sell the information to American enemies for a profit.

Al agrees and goes to San Diego to begin his military service. Hank, Betty and friends follow, trailing clues that could help clear Al's good name. They end up in the clutches of gangsters who take them hostage.

Al discloses to superior officer Col. Halliday that the criminals want him to steal a Navy boat on the Germans' behalf. Halliday has him go through with it, then attacks the Germans when they attempt to take the vessel. Al is killed in a heroic effort. He is praised by Halliday, who also feels Hank might be mature enough to enlist after all.

== Cast ==
- Bonita Granville as Betty Haines
- Ray McDonald as Hank Parker
- Dan Dailey as Al Haines
- Leo Gorcey as 'Snap' Collins
- Henry O'Neill as Col. Halliday
- Stanley Clements as Louie Schwartz
- Charles Smith as Crawford Cortland
- Dorothy Morris as Mildred Burnette
- Rudolph Anders as Henry Schrode
- Joe Sawyer as Dutch
- Anthony Warde as Tony
- William Tannen as Matt Herman
