= Charles D. Hall =

British-American art director and production designer

- Born: April 20, 1888; Norwich, England
- Died: April 8, 1970 (aged 81); Los Angeles, California
- Occupation: Art director

Charles D. Hall (April 20, 1888 – April 8, 1970) was a British–American art director and production designer. He is perhaps best remembered for his tenure at Universal Pictures, where he began his career during the silent era. He was art director for many of Universal's most famous productions of the 1920s and 1930s: The Phantom of the Opera (1925), All Quiet on the Western Front (1930), the original Bela Lugosi Dracula (1931), the original Magnificent Obsession (1935), and the 1936 My Man Godfrey among them, as well as eleven films directed by James Whale, including the original Boris Karloff Frankenstein (1931), The Invisible Man (1933), Bride of Frankenstein (1935), and the 1936 film version of Show Boat. Hall also worked on the 1929 part-talkie film version of Show Boat, directed by Harry A. Pollard.

Hall left Universal in the late 1930s and went to United Artists, where he worked for producer Hal Roach on such films as Topper Takes a Trip, the first of the two sequels to 1937's Topper. He then worked for a time on mostly B-films.

Hall later moved into working in television. He ended his career as art director for the pioneering 1955 TV series Medic.

Hall bought a house from John Wayne in which he lived until his death. From the late 1950s–1960s, Hall was known for his watercolor paintings.

He was nominated for two Academy Awards, but neither nomination was for one of his famous films. They were for the films Captain Fury and Merrily We Live.

== Selected filmography ==
- Not Wanted (1949)
- Shamrock Hill (1949)

== Sources ==
- Charles D. Hall at IMDb
