= Exclusive Story =

1936 film by George B. Seitz

- Theatrical release poster
- Directed by: George B. Seitz
- Screenplay by: Michael Fessier
- Story by: Martin Mooney
- Produced by: Lucien Hubbard
- Starring: Franchot Tone; Madge Evans; Stuart Erwin; Joseph Calleia; Robert Barrat; J. Farrell MacDonald
- Cinematography: Lester White
- Edited by: Conrad A. Nervig
- Music by: Edward Ward
- Production company: Metro-Goldwyn-Mayer
- Distributed by: Metro-Goldwyn-Mayer
- Release date: January 17, 1936
- Running time: 73 minutes
- Country: United States
- Language: English

Exclusive Story is a 1936 American drama film directed by George B. Seitz and written by Michael Fessier. The film stars Franchot Tone, Madge Evans, Stuart Erwin, Joseph Calleia, Robert Barrat and J. Farrell MacDonald. The film was released on January 17, 1936, by Metro-Goldwyn-Mayer.

== Plot ==
In 1935, the numbers racket (selling of illegal lottery tickets) is big business throughout New York City, much of it controlled by mobsters, who are feared by the populace. Meanwhile, crusading, likeable young newspaper reporter Tim Higgins has just published an exposé of graft in the awarding of major city contracts, only to have his article challenged by the accused, who threatens to sue for libel. He is ordered by his editor to print an apology, Higgins is approached by Ann Devlin, the daughter of a kindly old shopkeeper near the waterfront. She pleads for Higgins to help her father, who was just visited and ordered by a mob representative to aggressively increase his sales of lottery numbers to gullible store patrons. Higgins over many days interviews Ann, her father, and other witnesses, sometimes over dinner dates. He jokes to his wife that he is dating a blonde. He gets help from Dick Barton, the newspaper's lawyer. At one point, they receive a package containing a dynamite bomb. Mr. Devlin eventually sells his store to a man he does not realize is a mobster, who throws in a free sea voyage to Cuba. Suddenly, radio news reports that Devlin's ship is aflame and sinking off North Carolina. Higgins and Barton hastily board an open-cockpit(!) airplane to fly and view the disaster, taking photographs of the burning ship. Devlin is among the passengers rescued, and he later tells his daughter that the cause of the fire can be laid at the feet of the mob. Due to having this incriminating knowledge, Devlin is killed by the mob. In the end, however, the murderer is tricked into a confession, not only of his role but of the identities of the men at the top.

== Cast ==
- Franchot Tone as Dick Barton
- Madge Evans as Ann Devlin
- Stuart Erwin as Timothy Aloysius Higgins
- Joseph Calleia as Ace Acello
- Robert Barrat as Werther
- J. Farrell MacDonald as Michael Devlin
- Louise Henry as Tess Graham
- Margaret Irving as Mrs. Higgins
- Wade Boteler as O'Neil
- Charles Trowbridge as James Witherspoon Sr.
- William "Bill" Henry as James Witherspoon Jr.
- Raymond Hatton as City Editor
- J. Carrol Naish as Comos

== Critical reception ==
Frank Nugent of The New York Times wrote that Joseph Calleia "is rapidly becoming this department's favorite villain. Last week Mr. Calleia stole Riffraff from the great Jean Harlow; here, with less serious competition, it is not so much a matter of theft as of open expressage. As Ace Acello, the vicious lieutenant of the numbers king, Mr. Calleia contributes a performance that must be remembered when the time comes to take inventory of the year's best."

Variety provided a negative review, and wrote, "in spite of some distinguished performances, and some thrilling bits, it’s grade B", and concluded that "the direction is good and the production is handsomely done, but the story is too disconnected to carry the interest along properly." The review offered positive comments for some of the actors, stating, "acting honors go to Joseph Calleia … he dominates the early action and gets the big scene at the finish. Second honors go to Stuart Erwin … there are times when he strongly suggests the late Will Rogers. Tone is just in to lend his name to the marquee."

The Film Daily described it as "an exciting drama." They wrote "[It] has the usual Metro snap and polish, and the suspense and tenseness is balanced with fine love interest that becomes a vital part of the story and is not just thrown in. Cast is tops all the way."
