= McElbert Moore =

American writer (1892–1972)

McElbert Moore (July 2, 1892 – April 10, 1972) was an American playwright, screenwriter, and lyricist.

Born Elbert Francis Moore in Boston, he attended Waltham High School. He worked as a drama critic and editor at local newspapers. He was part of the Harvard College class of 1916 and was a pilot candidate in the Army from October to November 1918 before working on the Army's theatrical productions.

He wrote several plays in the 1920s. He co-wrote screenplays for several films in the 1940s.

As a lyricist, he worked with Anton Lada and J. Fred Coots.

He married actress Margaret Moore. They wrote the song "Don't Take My Balloon".

== Filmography ==
- Ever Since Venus (1944), co-writer with Arthur Dreifuss
- An Old Fashioned Girl (1949)
- Shamrock Hill (1949), co-writer with Arthur Hoerl
- There's a Girl in My Heart (1949), co-writer with Arthur Hoerl

== Discography ==
- "Back Numbers in My Little Red Book" (1922), lyrics, music by J. Fred Coots
- "Only One" (1953), from Matinee Girl
- "Like-a-Me, Like-a-You, from Matinee Girl
- "When" (1953), from A Night in Paris (1926)
- "Why Should We Be Wasting Time?" from A Night in Paris, lyrics
- "Fascinating Lady" from A Night in Paris, lyrics

== Theater ==
- The Eclipse (1922)
- Spice of 1922 (1922), lyrics
- Dew Drop Inn (1923)
- Plain Jane (1924)
- The Matinee Girl (1926)
- A Night in Paris (1926)
- Happy (1927)
- Zeppelin (1929)
- Hanky Panky
- The Bal Tabarin (1923)
- Innocent Eyes
- Hello Everybody
- Sittin Pretty
- Accidentally Yours
- Leave it to Me
- Junetime
