= Born to Sing (1942 film) =

1942 film by Edward Ludwig

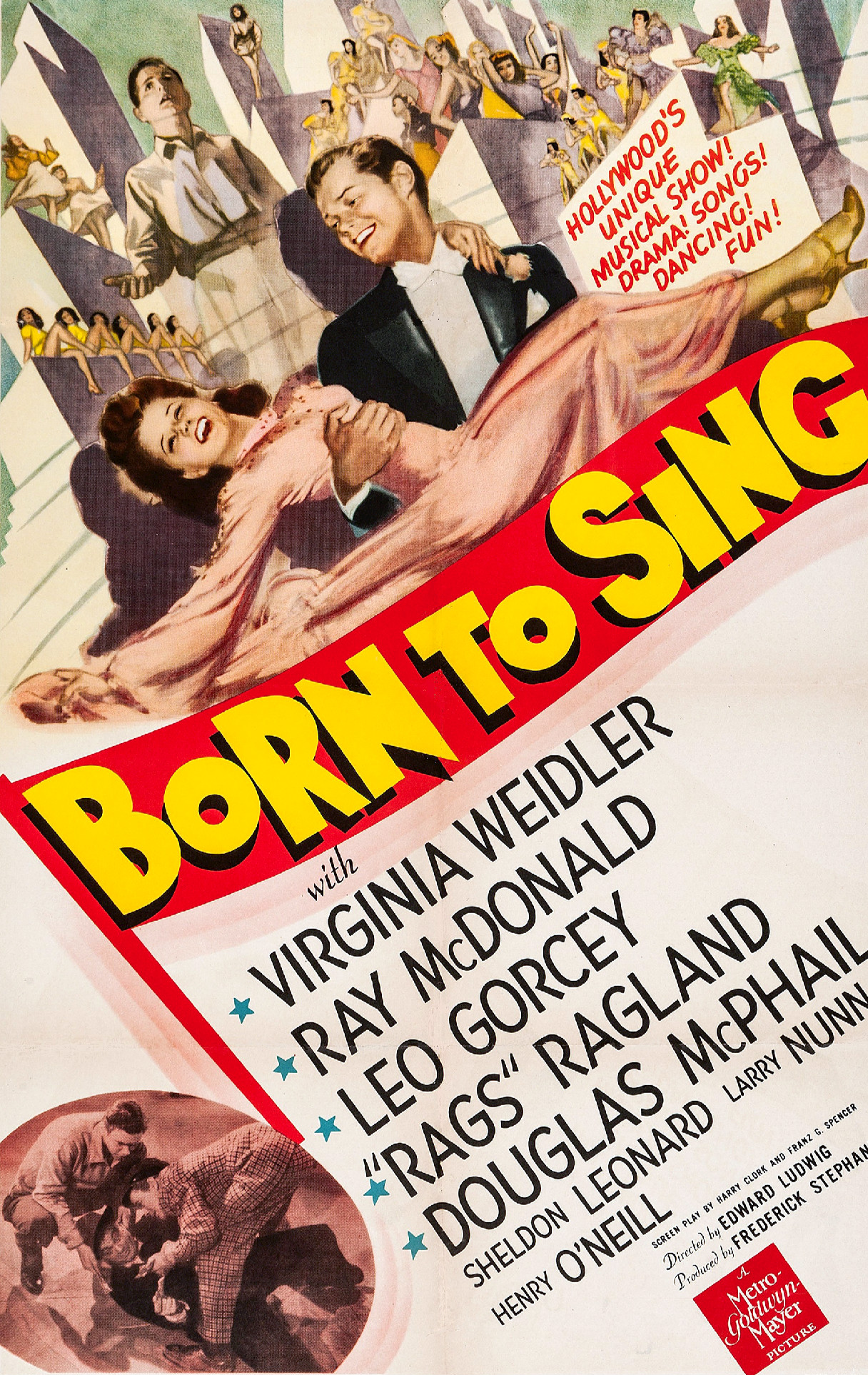
- Film poster
- Directed by: Edward Ludwig
- Written by: Franz Schulz; Harry Clork
- Produced by: Frederick Stephani
- Starring: Virginia Weidler; Ray McDonald; Leo Gorcey; Rags Ragland; Douglas McPhail
- Cinematography: Sidney Wagner
- Edited by: Robert J. Kern
- Music by: Lennie Hayton; David Snell
- Distributed by: Metro-Goldwyn-Mayer
- Release date: 1942
- Running time: 82 mins
- Country: United States
- Language: English
- Budget: $465,000
- Box office: $543,000

Born to Sing is a 1942 American musical film directed by Edward Ludwig starring Virginia Weidler and Ray McDonald.

== Plot ==
Frank Eastman is a down-on-his-luck show tune composer. He wrote some music while in prison which was subsequently stolen by well-to-do show promoter Arthur Cartwright. When Eastman's teenage daughter Patsy befriends some boys her age who plead with Cartwright to get Eastman the credit he is due. Cartwright calls the police, claiming extortion.

When the boys are arrested, they are placed in the same paddy wagon as gangster Pete Detroit. Pete's gang frees them all.

Patsy and the boys decide they can prove Eastman is the true composer if they perform a show before Cartwright's show debuts. They recruit neighborhood children and teens to perform.

== Cast ==
- Virginia Weidler as Patsy Eastman
- Ray McDonald as Steve
- Leo Gorcey as "Snap" Collins
- Rags Ragland as Grunt
- Douglas McPhail as Murray Saunders
- Sheldon Leonard as Pete Detroit
- Henry O'Neill as Frank Eastman
- Larry Nunn as Mike Conroy
- Margaret Dumont as Mrs. E. V. Lawson
- Beverly Hudson as Maggie Cooper
- Richard Hall as Mozart Cooper
- Darla Hood as Quiz Kid
- Lester Matthews as Arthur Cartwright
- Ben Carter as Eight Ball
- Lee Phelps as Mr. Porter
- Connie Gilchrist as Welfare Worker
- Cy Kendall as Police Captain

== Reception ==
The film made $298,000 in the US and Canada and $245,000 elsewhere, making MGM a loss of $138,000.
