= Chip Off the Old Block =

1944 film by Charles Lamont

- Directed by: Charles Lamont
- Screenplay by: Eugene Conrad; Leo Townsend
- Story by: Robert Arthur
- Produced by: Bernard W. Burton
- Starring: Donald O'Connor; Peggy Ryan; Ann Blyth
- Cinematography: Charles Van Enger
- Edited by: Charles Maynard
- Music by: Larry Russell
- Color process: Black and white
- Production company: Universal Pictures
- Distributed by: Universal Pictures
- Release date: February 1, 1944
- Running time: 71 minutes
- Country: United States
- Language: English

Chip Off the Old Block is a 1944 American comedy musical film starring Donald O'Connor, Peggy Ryan, and Ann Blyth in her film debut.

== Plot ==
The son of a strict Navy man, O'Connor falls in love with a girl from a performing family. In the end, the families learn to accept their differences and they are allowed to be in love freely.

== Cast ==
- Donald O'Connor as Donald Corrigan
- Peggy Ryan as Peggy Flaherty
- Ann Blyth as Glory Marlow III
- Helen Vinson as Glory Marlow Jr.
- Helen Broderick as Glory Marlow Sr.
- Arthur Treacher as Quentin
- Patric Knowles as Commander Judd Corrigan
- J. Edward Bromberg as Blaney Wright
- Ernest Truex as Henry McHugh
- Minna Gombell as Milly
- Samuel S. Hinds as Dean Manning
- Irving Bacon as Prof. Frost
- Joel Kupperman as Quiz Kid
- Mantan Moreland as Porter
- unbilled players include Leon Belasco, Vernon Dent and Dorothy Granger

== See also ==
- List of American films of 1944
