= Ever Since Venus =

1944 film directed by Arthur Dreifuss

- Directed by: Arthur Dreifuss
- Written by: McElbert Moore; Arthur Dreifuss
- Produced by: Rudolph Flothow
- Starring: Ina Ray Hutton; Hugh Herbert; Ann Savage; Billy Gilbert
- Cinematography: Benjamin Kline
- Edited by: Otto Meyer
- Music by: Lyle Murphy; Mario Silva
- Production company: Columbia Pictures
- Release date: September 14, 1944 (US)
- Running time: 75 minutes
- Country: United States
- Language: English

Ever Since Venus is a 1944 American comedy directed by Arthur Dreifuss, in his first effort for Columbia Pictures, and stars Ina Ray Hutton, Hugh Herbert, Ann Savage, and Billy Gilbert. It was Hutton's first major film role; she had become famous for her all-female band during the 1930s, which had been the inspiration for the band in Billy Wilder's 1959 film, Some Like It Hot.

== Plot ==
A cosmetics manufacturer, J. Webster Hackett, hires Ina Ray Hutton and her band to headline a promotional beauty show. Hutton offers a thousand dollars reward for anyone who can submit a winning theme song. Not knowing of Hutton's offer, a local short order cook, Tiny Lewis, who is also an aspiring songwriter, gets one of his songs to Hutton. Hutton lets him know that she'll give him an answer within a day. When Lewis gets home, he finds out his roommates, Bradley Miller and Michele, have developed a new lipstick. A local beauty shop manager, Janet Wilson, thinks the product is a winner, as well as becoming enamored with Miller. She encourages them to enter the lipstick in a beauty products contest. Through a series and twists and turns, Lewis' song is chosen, and he and his roommates use the $1000 reward from the song contest to pay the fee needed to showcase their lipstick at the beauty products show. A rival manufacturer to Hackett, P.G. Grimble, backs the product and agrees to produce the lipstick at his factories. As the deal is announced, Brad and Janet end up together.

== Cast ==
- Ina Ray Hutton, and Her Orchestra
- Hugh Herbert as P. G. Grimble
- Ann Savage as Janet Wilson
- Billy Gilbert as Tiny Lewis
- Glenda Farrell as Babs Cartwright
- Ross Hunter as Bradley Miller
- Alan Mowbray as J. Webster Hackett
- Marjorie Gateson as Maude Hackett
- Thurston Hall as Edgar Pomeroy
- Fritz Feld as Michele

== Production ==
The original title of this production was Beauty For Sale. In November 1943 it was announced that the film was being scheduled for production at Columbia. Dreifuss left Monogram Pictures to return to Columbia as part of a deal to write/direct films, where he previously worked in the 1930s. Beauty was to be his first project on his return, with McElbert Moore assisting in the writing duties. The duo had written the story, and in November were beginning work on the screenplay. Shooting on the movie, whose title had been changed to Ever Since Venus, began the week of May 15, the only film to begin that week at Columbia, and making it one of fifty-five pictures being produced in Hollywood at that time. Also in May it was revealed that picture was to be a musical, produced by Rudolph Flothow, and the cast would contain Ann Savage, Ina Ray Hutton (and her band), Hugh Hubert, and Billy Gilbert. The film was in production from mid-May through the second week of June 1944. After production ended, it was revealed that Alan Mowbray, Ross Hunter, Glenda Farrell, Marjorie Gateson, Fritz Feld, and Bill Shawn were also members of the cast. As of the beginning of August, the film's release date had not been decided on, but by the second week of August it was announced as September 14. The film's success led to Dreifuss being given a long-term contract at Columbia. Months after its release, the Legion of Decency gave the film an "A-2" rating.

== Reception ==
Harrison's Reports called the story thin and routine, but felt that the comedy overcame it. They particularly highlighted the work of Herbert and Gilbert, as well as enjoying the romantic elements as provided by Hunter and Savage. Meanwhile, The Film Daily gave the picture a very positive review, calling it "...a human story packed with laughs." They applauded Dreifuss' direction, rating it "expert", and extolled the virtues of Hutton and her orchestra. 'Motion Picture Daily also gave he picture good reviews, stating the Hutton gave the story "zing" and was "fresh and plentiful". They gave good marks to the direction of Dreifuss, and the musical numbers. The film also received positive press from the Motion Picture Herald, saying that the comedy contained "... more than its promise of mirth, music and merriment ...." They singled out Dreifuss' direction, the musical talents of Hutton, and the comedic efforts of Gilbert, Herbert, Mowbray and Feld. Showmen's Trade Review felt the film was good for top billing in double features, calling it "Excellent music and comedy". They gave high marks to Dreifuss' direction, as well as the comedic acting of Gilbert, Herbert, and Mowbray, and felt the pace of the film alternated nicely between drama, comedy and music. They also applauded Hutton and Savage's performances.
