= All Ashore =

1953 film by Richard Quine

- Original film poster
- Directed by: Richard Quine
- Screenplay by: Blake Edwards; Richard Quine
- Story by: Blake Edwards; Robert Wells
- Produced by: Jonie Taps
- Starring: Mickey Rooney; Dick Haymes; Peggy Ryan; Ray McDonald; Barbara Bates; Jody Lawrence
- Cinematography: Charles Lawton Jr.
- Edited by: Jerome Thoms
- Color process: Technicolor
- Production company: Columbia Pictures
- Distributed by: Columbia Pictures
- Release dates: February 1, 1953 (New York City-Premiere); March 3, 1953 (United States)
- Running time: 80 minutes
- Country: United States
- Language: English

All Ashore is a 1953 American comedy musical film directed by Richard Quine and starring Mickey Rooney, Dick Haymes, Peggy Ryan and Ray McDonald.

In the tradition of MGM's Anchors Aweigh and On the Town, the film tells the stories of three sailors (Rooney, crooner Dick Haymes and dancer Ray McDonald) on shore leave on Santa Catalina Island, California, where much of the film was shot. A former MGM contract star, McDonald was married to Peggy Ryan at the time, with All Ashore being the last film for both of them.

== Plot ==
Three petty officers have returned from Korea on the battle cruiser USS Rochester, and disembark for long-awaited shore leave in California. Skip Edwards and Joe Carter have no money due to losses in a crap game, but their shipmate Francis "Moby" Dickerson has $300 ($3,600 today) he won in poker. Skip and Joe have constantly taken advantage of Moby throughout their cruise and once again beg some money off him. Moby wishes to spend his leave on Santa Catalina but his shipmates take an unwilling Moby to an off-limits clip joint bar where bargirls and a bartender drug and rob them of all their money.

Waking up broke and guilty but wiser, Joe is determined to get Moby to Santa Catalina by using his scheming ability. Joe arranges their passage and $5 each in exchange for Moby working on the ship. Skip meets dancer Gay Knight where an impromptu dance session earns them some more money that entertained passengers throw at them. Gay takes them to her trailer park where the three have enough money for two of them to rent a cabin; Moby has to sneak in at night and sleep at the floor. Skip arranges more money and meals for a second day by having Moby work as a waiter in a night club. Moby meets Nancy Flynn, the daughter of the trailer park owner, when she hits him in the head with a horseshoe, but Skip later sweeps her off her feet and takes her for his own girl.

After entering the wrong cabin and unsuccessfully hiding from the two women living there, Moby becomes further dejected when he feels out of place accompanying his shipmates and their girlfriends to the beach. The unwanted Moby decides to return to the mainland. Having to wait half an hour for the next ship, Moby's luck changes when he meets Jane Stanton, whose motorboat is not working. In fixing the engine, Moby is thrown in the water. Jane takes Moby to her father Commodore Stanton's yacht where his uniform can dry out. She invites Moby to a party and the Commodore, invites Moby to sail with them to the mainland. On the way to the party Jane's boat fails again with both Moby and Jane being thrown into the water as the boat comes to life and motors off without them.

Moby gets his confidence back by saving Jane, who cannot swim, and using his navigation skills to get them back to safety in Avalon. The grateful Commodore throws a party for Moby where he turns the tables on his scheming shipmates when Sheriff Billings, who had arrested Joe and Skip, turn them over to Moby where he has them fanning him and Jane in the manner of servants.

== Cast ==
- Mickey Rooney as Francis "Moby" Dickerson
- Dick Haymes as Joe Carter
- Peggy Ryan as Gay Knight
- Ray McDonald as Skip Edwards
- Barbara Bates as Jane Stanton
- Jody Lawrance as Nancy Flynn
- Fay Roope as Commodore Stanton
- Jean Willes as Rose
- Rica Owen as Dotty
- Patricia Walker as Susie
- Eddie Parker as Sheriff Billings (as Edwin Parker)

== See also ==
- List of American films of 1953
