= Peggy Ryan =

American actress and dancer (1924–2004)

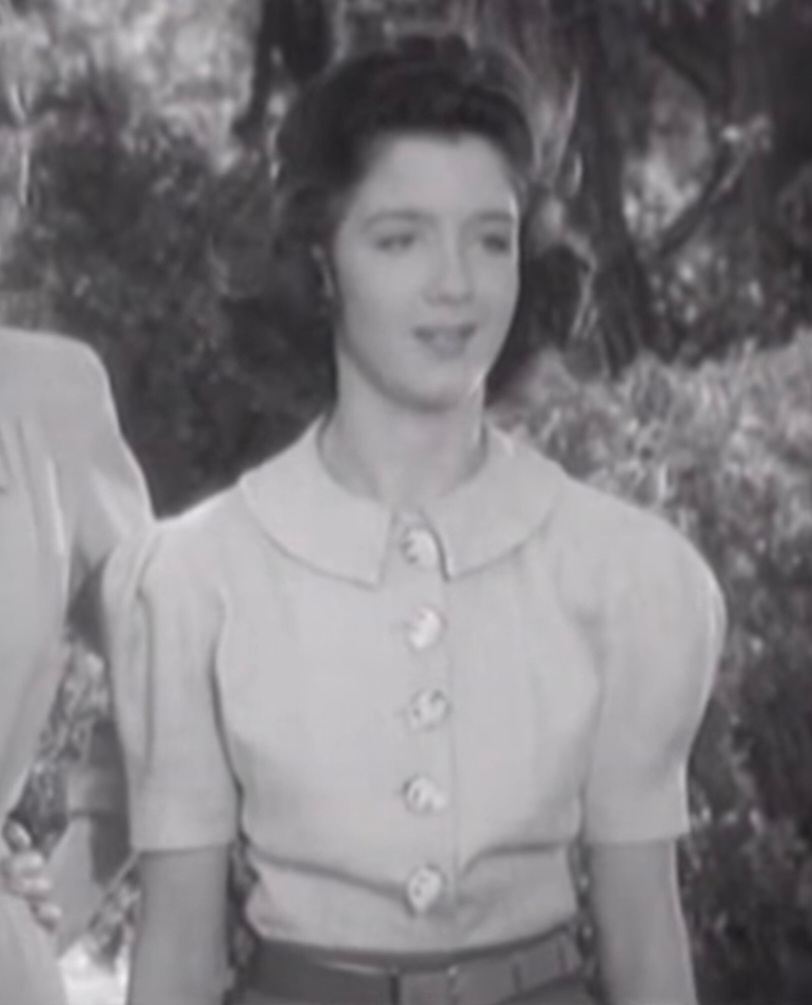
- Ryan in Private Buckaroo (1942)
- Born: Margaret O'Rene Ryan; August 28, 1924; Long Beach, California, U.S.
- Died: October 30, 2004 (aged 80); Las Vegas, Nevada, U.S.
- Occupations: Actress; dancer
- Years active: 1930–1983
- Known for: What's Cookin'?; Get Hep to Love; Hawaii Five-O
- Spouses: James Cross (m. 1947; div. 1952) Ray McDonald (m. 1953; div. 1957) Eddie Sherman (m. 1958)

Margaret O'Rene Ryan (August 28, 1924 – October 30, 2004) was an American dancer and actress, best known for starring in a series of movie musicals at Universal Pictures with Donald O'Connor and Gloria Jean.

== Career ==
Ryan joined her parents' vaudeville act, "The Merry Dancing Ryans", before she was 3 years old, and appeared in her first film, Wedding of Jack and Jill (1929) when she was 4. She attended Hollywood Professional School.

Her singing, acting, and dancing skills were noticed by song-and-dance actor George Murphy, who helped her get a role in 1937's Top of the Town. However, her entry in the book Vaudeville old & new: an encyclopedia of variety performances in America, Volume 1 notes, "[B]y then she was outgrowing the kiddie parts, yet not old enough for the teenage roles."

She continued working in small roles until 1942, when she had a solo number in the feature film What's Cookin'?. The Gloria Jean-Donald O'Connor-Peggy Ryan team were a great hit with audiences and exhibitors, and the three teens made five features together. Her screen character in these films was usually brash, wisecracking, and boy-crazy. In 1944, Ryan advanced to more elaborate productions, in support of Jack Oakie and Abbott and Costello.

She left Universal in 1945 and married James Cross that same year; they were divorced in 1952. She returned to the screen with dancer Ray McDonald for 1949's There's a Girl in My Heart and Shamrock Hill, and 1953's All Ashore. They wed in 1953 and toured together in a nightclub act before being divorced in 1957. Her third marriage, in 1958, was to Hawaii columnist Eddie Sherman, following which she left movies for choreography and semiretirement. Sherman adopted her two children from her previous marriages.

On television, Ryan played a recurring role as secretary Jenny Sherman in Hawaii Five-O from 1969–76.

In later years, she trained Las Vegas showgirls in tap dancing. Her last public performance, at her 80th birthday party, was a hilarious song-and-dance routine for her former Universal studio colleagues. She continued to teach tap until two days before her death.

== Death ==
Ryan died in 2004 at age 80, following two strokes. Her ashes were scattered under the Hollywood sign in Hollywood, California.

Eddie Sherman died in 2013 in Hawaii .

== Filmography ==
Features:

- Top of the Town (1937) - Peggy
- The Women Men Marry (1937) - Mary Jane
- The Flying Irishman (1939) - Miss Edith Corrigan - Doug's Sister (uncredited)
- She Married a Cop (1939) - Trudy
- The Grapes of Wrath (1940) - Hungry Girl (uncredited)
- Sailor's Lady (1940) - Ellen
- What's Cookin'? (1942) - Peggy
- Girls' Town (1942) - Penny
- Private Buckaroo (1942) - Bonnie-Belle Schlopkiss
- Miss Annie Rooney (1942) - Myrtle
- Give Out, Sisters (1942) - Peggy
- Get Hep to Love (1942) - Betty Blake
- When Johnny Comes Marching Home (1942) - Dusty
- Mister Big (1943) - Peggy
- Top Man (1943) - Jane Warren
- Chip Off the Old Block (1944) - Himself
- Follow the Boys (1944) - Peggy Ryan
- This Is the Life (1944) - Sally McGuire
- The Merry Monahans (1944) - Patsy Monahan
- Babes on Swing Street (1944) - Trudy Costello
- Bowery to Broadway (1944) - Specialty Number
- Here Come the Co-Eds (1945) - Patty Gayle
- Patrick the Great (1945) - Judy Watkin
- That's the Spirit (1945) - Sheila Gogarty
- On Stage Everybody (1945) - Molly Sullivan
- Men in Her Diary (1945) - Doris Mann
- Shamrock Hill (1949) - Eileen Rogan
- There's a Girl in My Heart (1949) - Sally Mullin
- All Ashore (1953) - Gay Night

Short subjects:

- Billy Rose's Casa Mañana Revue (1938) - Peggy Dixon
- A Night at the Troc (1939)
- Varsity Vanities (1940)
- Universal Musical Short 3655: Singin' and Swingin (1950)

== Television work ==
- Hawaii Five-O (appeared in 49 episodes between 1968–1976)
- Pleasure Palace (1980)

== See also ==
- List of dancers
