= Magnificent Obsession =

1929 novel by American author Lloyd C. Douglas

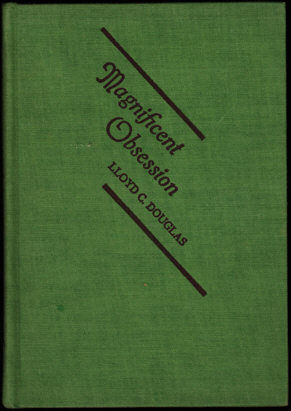
- 1933 edition
- Author: Lloyd C. Douglas
- Language: English
- Genre: Novel
- Publisher: Willett, Clark & Colby
- Publication date: 1929
- Publication place: United States
- Media type: Print (hardback & paperback)
- Text: Magnificent Obsession online

Magnificent Obsession is a 1929 novel by American author Lloyd C. Douglas. It was one of four of his books that were eventually made into blockbuster motion pictures, the other three being The Robe, White Banners and The Big Fisherman.

== Plot summary ==
Robert Merrick is resuscitated by a rescue crew after a boating accident. The crew is thus unable to save the life of Dr. Hudson, a physician renowned for his ability to help people, who was having a heart attack at the same time on the other side of the lake. Merrick then decides to devote his life to making up for the doctor's, and becomes a physician himself.

Mrs. Hudson, the widow, moves to Europe after her daughter Joyce is married. Merrick progresses in his career, and in the story's climax, gets involved in a railway accident in which Mrs. Hudson suffers serious injury. Merrick is instrumental in her recovery, and Merrick and Mrs. Hudson subsequently marry.

== Inspiration ==
The story behind the novel, and the identity of the surgeon on whose life it is based, is mentioned in articles in the American Association of Neurosurgeons' journal AANS Neurosurgeon, Magnificent Obsession and "Inspirations and Epiphanies"

The theme of the book is based on a passage from the Gospel of Matthew (chapter 6:1-4):

"Take heed that ye do not your alms before men, to be seen of them: otherwise ye have no reward of your Father which is in heaven.....That thine alms may be in secret: and thy Father which seeth in secret himself shall reward thee openly."

The philosophy behind the book is also partly that of "pay it forward", the idea that good deeds received are not to be paid back to the doer of the deed, but to a needing person in the future.

== Dr. Hudson's Secret Journal ==
Douglas later wrote a book in response to the flood of letters he received from readers who wanted to know where they could find the book to which he referred in the novel, Dr. Hudson's Secret Journal. The Robert Merrick character decoded the journal, from which he learned the secret of his extraordinary success as a doctor. (According to the book, the secret was the literal practice of doing good deeds secretly, and thereby reaping spiritual power to use in becoming an excellent doctor.)

== Adaptations ==
- Magnificent Obsession (1935), film directed by John M. Stahl
- Magnificent Obsession (1954), film directed by Douglas Sirk
- Sublime Obsessão (1958), series directed by Dionísio Azevedo
- Dr. Hudson's Secret Journal 1955-1957 television series.
