= Green Light (1937 film) =

1937 film by Frank Borzage

- Theatrical poster
- Directed by: Frank Borzage
- Screenplay by: Milton Krims; Paul Green
- Based on: Green Light by Lloyd C. Douglas
- Produced by: Frank Borzage
- Starring: Errol Flynn; Anita Louise; Margaret Lindsay
- Cinematography: Byron Haskin
- Edited by: James Gibbon
- Music by: Max Steiner
- Production company: Cosmopolitan Productions
- Distributed by: Warner Bros. Pictures
- Release date: February 12, 1937 (New York)
- Running time: 85 minutes
- Country: United States
- Language: English
- Budget: $513,000
- Box office: $1.7 million

Green Light is a 1937 American drama film directed by Frank Borzage and starring Errol Flynn, Anita Louise and Margaret Lindsay. The film is adapted from a novel written by Lloyd C. Douglas. The novel is closely related to Douglas' previous book, Magnificent Obsession, which was also adapted as a film. It was Flynn's first starring role in a studio film not based on action.

== Plot ==
Dr. Newell Paige is a surgeon whose refusal to name the real culprit in an operation gone fatally awry results in the ruin of his career. Dismissed from the hospital staff, Paige leaves Massachusetts and travels to Montana to assist a researcher into Rocky Mountain spotted fever, almost dying when he subjects himself to an experimental serum. Eventually Paige returns to his former post and is cleared of all charges.

== Cast ==
- Errol Flynn as Dr. Newell Paige
- Anita Louise as Phyllis Dexter
- Margaret Lindsay as Frances Ogilvie
- Sir Cedric Hardwicke as Dean Harcourt
- Walter Abel as John Stafford
- Spring Byington as Mrs. Dexter
- Henry O'Neill as Dr. Endicott
- Erin O'Brien-Moore as Pat Arlen
- Henry Kolker as Dr. Lane
- Pierre Watkin as Dr. Booth
- Granville Bates as Sheriff
- St. Luke's Choristers

== Production ==
Originally Warner Bros. announced that Leslie Howard would be the star and he was scheduled to begin filming Green Light at the end of June 1935 after completion of his run in The Petrified Forest on Broadway. However, a persistent bout of boils repeatedly hospitalized Howard throughout the production and forced him to withdraw. Warner Bros. then announced the leads as Errol Flynn and Olivia de Havilland, but De Havilland withdrew and the female leads were announced as Anita Louise and Ann Dvorak. However, Dvorak was replaced by Margaret Lindsay.

After starring in the swashbuckling films Captain Blood and The Charge of the Light Brigade, Flynn asked Warner Bros. for a different type of role and was cast in Green Light as the result following Howard's withdrawal. However, Flynn would return to a swashbuckling role in his next film, The Prince and the Pauper.

== Reception ==
In a contemporary review for The New York Times, critic Frank S. Nugent wrote that Green Light suffered in its transition to the screen: "[I]t is unable to disguise (as the novel did) the author's weakness as a story-teller. Mr. Douglas dealt with familiar, well-worn plot materials and he unraveled them more often by coincidence than by reason. It was chiefly the conversation—the readable, intelligent, even inspirational theorizing—of his characters that kept his narrative alive. ... [The film] exposes serious structural weaknesses and probably will cause many who had not read the original to wonder what all the shouting was about."

Released theatrically on February 20, 1937, Green Light was popular at the American box office. According to Warner Bros. records, the film earned $1,254,000 domestically and $416,000 foreign, making it the studio's second-most popular film of 1937 (the first was The Prince and the Pauper).

== Home media ==
The Warner Archive Collection, a made-on-demand disc branch of Warner Home Video, released the film on DVD-R on November 10, 2010.
