= George Davis (art director) =

American art director (1914–1998)

George W. Davis
- Born: April 17, 1914; Kokomo, Indiana, United States
- Died: October 3, 1998 (aged 84)
- Occupation: Art director
- Employer(s): 20th Century Fox (1947-1959); Metro-Goldwyn-Mayer (1959-1970)
- Known for: Celebrated work as an art director

George Davis (April 17, 1914 – October 3, 1998) was an American art director and was the supervising art director at MGM from 1959 to 1970. He won two Academy Awards for Best Art Direction for his work on The Robe in 1954 and for The Diary of Anne Frank in 1960.

== Career ==
Davis began his career as a sketch artist at Warner Brothers Studio. He joined the U.S. Marines during World War II and was discharged as a colonel. He then began work at 20th Century Fox with his first film being Joseph L. Mankiewicz's fantasy The Ghost and Mrs. Muir in 1947, a director for whom he frequently worked including House of Strangers (1949), No Way Out (1950) and 5 Fingers (1952).

He received the first of 17 Academy Award nominations in 1951 for Best Art Direction-Set Decoration, Black-and-White for All About Eve, also directed by Mankiewicz.

He won his first Academy Award for Best Art Direction, Color in 1954 for his work on The Robe. He was also heavily involved in some of the other big religious productions of the 1950s, such as David and Bathsheba (1951), Demetrius and the Gladiators and The Egyptian (both 1954).

In 1959 he joined Metro-Goldwyn-Mayer and became the studio's supervising art director following the death of William A. Horning, with Hans Peters as his assistant.

He won his second Academy Award in 1960 for Best Art Direction, Black-and-White for The Diary of Anne Frank which was made during his time at Fox.

At the Academy Awards in 1963, he was nominated for three films - The Wonderful World of the Brothers Grimm, Mutiny on the Bounty and Period of Adjustment.

His 17th and last nomination was for The Shoes of the Fisherman in 1969.

Other notable films include Love is a Many Splendored Thing (1955), Funny Face (1957), Cimarron (1960), How the West Was Won (1963), Twilight of Honor (1963), The Unsinkable Molly Brown (1964), The Americanization of Emily (1964), A Patch of Blue (1965), Mr. Buddwing (1966).

He also worked extensively in TV on such shows as The Twilight Zone and The Man from U.N.C.L.E..

Davis was also the initial project manager of Tokyo Disneyland, designed the General Motors exhibit at the 1964 New York World's Fair and the primary designer of Park City, Utah.

He was married to Barbara Louise Davis (née Davies) who died in 1990 at the age of 73. They had 2 children (Karen Louise Hoy, born 1940 and George Christopher Davis, born 1943). He lived in the same home in Santa Monica, California, from 1948 to his death in 1998.

== Awards ==
Davis won Oscars for his work on The Robe (1953) and The Diary of Anne Frank (1959). He was nominated an additional 15 times.

== Partial filmography ==
- The Ghost and Mrs. Muir (1947)
- Deep Waters (1948)
- House of Strangers (1949)
- The Beautiful Blonde from Bashful Bend (1949)
- No Way Out (1950)
- All About Eve (1950)
- David and Bathsheba (1951)
- Fourteen Hours (1951)
- Rawhide (1951)
- 5 Fingers (1952)
- The Robe (1953)
- Tonight We Sing (1953)
- Demetrius and the Gladiators (1954)
- The Egyptian (1954)
- The Seven Year Itch (1955)
- Love is a Many Splendored Thing (1955)
- Funny Face (1957)
- The Diary of Anne Frank (1959)
- BUtterfield 8 (1960)
- Please Don't Eat the Daisies (1960)
- Cimarron (1960)
- Home from the Hill (1960)
- Adventures of Huckleberry Finn (1960)
- All Fall Down (1961)
- Go Naked in the World (1961)
- Mutiny on the Bounty (1962)
- The Horizontal Lieutenant (1962)
- The Wonderful World of the Brothers Grimm (1962)
- Period of Adjustment (1962)
- The Hook (1963)
- How the West Was Won (1963)
- Twilight of Honor (1963)
- The Unsinkable Molly Brown (1964)
- Sunday in New York (1964)
- The Outrage (1964)
- Viva Las Vegas (1964)
- The Americanization of Emily (1964)
- A Patch of Blue (1965)
- The Cincinnati Kid (1965)
- The Sandpiper (1965)
- 36 Hours (1965)
- Spinout (1966)
- Mr. Buddwing (1966)
- Made in Paris (1966)
- The Venetian Affair (1967)
- The Scorpio Letters (1967)
- The Shoes of the Fisherman (1968)
- Heaven with a Gun (1969)
- Marlowe (1969)
- The Phantom Tollbooth (1970)
