= Lloyd C. Douglas =

American novelist (1877–1951)

- Born: August 27, 1877; Columbia City, Indiana, US
- Died: February 13, 1951 (aged 73); Los Angeles, California, US
- Resting place: Forest Lawn Memorial Park Cemetery
- Education: Wittenberg College
- Occupations: Minister, author
- Notable work: The Robe, The Big Fisherman, Magnificent Obsession
- Spouse: Bessie L Porch
- Children: 2

Lloyd Cassel Douglas (August 27, 1877 – February 13, 1951) was an American minister and author. Although Douglas was one of the most popular American authors of his time, he did not write his first novel until the age of 50.

== Biography ==
Douglas was born in Columbia City, Indiana. His father was a minister and the family lived for part of Douglas's boyhood in Monroeville and Wilmot, Indiana and Florence, Kentucky. In Florence, his father was the pastor of the Hopeful Lutheran Church.

After receiving a degree from Wittenberg College in Springfield, Ohio in 1903, Douglas was ordained in the Lutheran ministry. He served in pastorates in North Manchester, Indiana, Lancaster, Ohio and Washington, D.C.

After his ordainment, Douglas married Bessie I. Porch. They had two daughters together: Bessie J. Douglas, born about 1899, and Virginia V. Douglas, born about 1901.

From 1911 to 1915, Douglas was director of religious work at the University of Illinois Urbana-Champaign. For the next six years, he was minister of the First Congregational Church in Ann Arbor, Michigan. In 1920, he moved to Akron, Ohio, to serve as the senior minister of the First Congregational Church of Akron until 1926. Later that year, he moved to Los Angeles for a pastorate.

Douglas served as pastor at St. James United Church in Montreal, Quebec before retiring from the pastorate to write full time. His biographer Louis Sheaffer comments that "he never stated publicly why he changed denominations."

Douglas's first novel, Magnificent Obsession, published in 1929, was an immediate success. Critics held that his type of fiction was in the tradition of the great religious writings of an earlier generation, such as Ben-Hur and Quo Vadis.

Douglas followed this with his novels Forgive Us Our Trespasses, Precious Jeopardy, Green Light, White Banners, Disputed Passage, Invitation to Live, Doctor Hudson's Secret Journal, The Robe and The Big Fisherman.

== Adaptations ==
Magnificent Obsession was adapted twice for the screen, first as a 1935 film starring Robert Taylor and Irene Dunne, and in 1954, with Rock Hudson and Jane Wyman.

In 1937, the book Green Light was adapted for the screen in a film starring Errol Flynn. White Banners, starring Claude Rains and Fay Bainter, came to the screen in 1938. The film version of Disputed Passage was released in 1939. Dr. Hudson's Secret Journal, a prequel to The Magnificent Obsession, aired on syndicated television in 1955–1957. John Howard starred as Dr. Wayne Hudson in 78 episodes.

The Robe sold more than two million copies without any reprint edition. Douglas sold the motion picture rights to The Robe, although the film, starring Richard Burton, was not released until 1953, after Douglas's death.

Douglas was generally unhappy with the film adaptations of his works, so when he wrote The Big Fisherman as the sequel to The Robe, he raised certain stipulations related to its publication. He said that it would be his final novel and that he would not permit it to be adapted as a motion picture, used in any radio broadcast, condensed or serialized. However, The Big Fisherman was filmed in 1959, starring Howard Keel in one of his few non-singing screen roles.

Douglas's last book was the autobiographical Time to Remember, which described his life up to his childhood and education for the ministry. He died before he was able to write the intended second volume. His daughters, Virginia Douglas Dawson and Betty Douglas Wilson, completed the volume, published posthumously as The Shape of Sunday.

Douglas died in Los Angeles, California.

== Works ==
=== Novels ===
Magnificent Obsession series:

1. Magnificent Obsession (1929), ISBN 9780848804794
2. Doctor Hudson's Secret Journal (1939), ISBN 9780854560561, prequel

The Robe series:

1. The Robe (1942), ISBN 9780432031063
2. The Big Fisherman (1948), ISBN 9780395076309

Stand-alones:

- More Than a Prophet (1905), ISBN 9780548158364
- Forgive Us Our Trespasses (1932), ISBN 9780671782955
- Precious Jeopardy: A Christmas Story (1933), OCLC 1666171
- Green Light (1935), ISBN 9780340750247
- White Banners (1936), ISBN 9780330201612
- Home for Christmas (1937), ISBN 9789333182928
- Disputed Passage (1939), ISBN 9780432031018
- Invitation to Live (1940), ISBN 9781930548077

=== Non-fiction ===
- Wanted–A Congregation (1920), ISBN 9780243732357, religion
- An Affair of the Heart (1922), ISBN 9781245918749, religion
- The Minister's Everyday Life (1924), ASIN B004MGLCZU, religion
- These Sayings of Mine: An Interpretation of the Teachings of Jesus (1926), ASIN B003KCTOFW, religion
- Those Disturbing Miracles (1927), ISBN 9780766166349, religion
- The College Student Facing a Muddled World (1933), sociology
- Time to Remember (1951), ASIN B0167Q3QZ6, autobiography
- The Living Faith: Selected Sermons (1955), OCLC 1150214011, religion

=== Other ===
- The Fate of the Limited (1919)

== Adaptations ==
- Magnificent Obsession (1935), film directed by John M. Stahl, based on novel Magnificent Obsession
- Green Light (1937), film directed by Frank Borzage, based on novel Green Light
- White Banners (1938), film directed by Edmund Goulding, based on novel White Banners
- Disputed Passage (1939), film directed by Frank Borzage, based on novel Disputed Passage
- The Robe (1953), film directed by Henry Koster, based on novel The Robe
- Demetrius and the Gladiators (1954), film directed by Delmer Daves, based on novel The Robe
- Magnificent Obsession (1954), film directed by Douglas Sirk, based on novel Magnificent Obsession
- Dr. Hudson's Secret Journal (1955–1957), series directed by Peter Godfrey and Harry R. Sherman, based on novel Doctor Hudson's Secret Journal
- Luz da Esperança (1956), series based on novel Green Light
- Sublime Obsessão (1958), series directed by Dionísio Azevedo, based on novel Magnificent Obsession
- The Big Fisherman (1959), film directed by Frank Borzage, based on novel The Big Fisherman
