= Dr. Hudson's Secret Journal =

American TV medical series

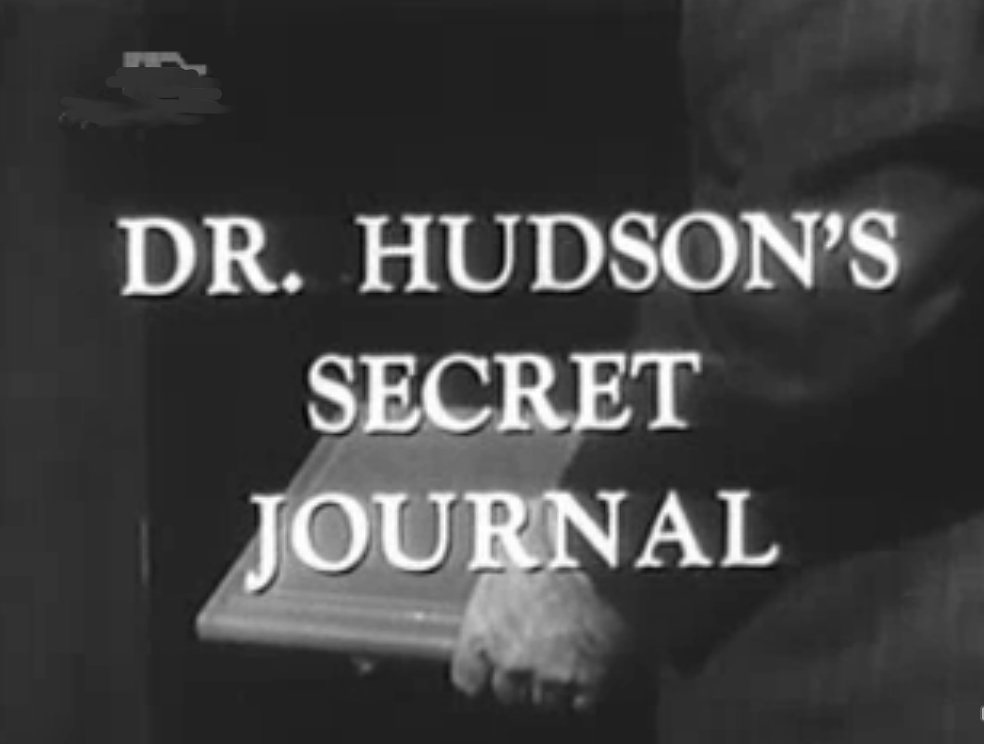
- Series title sequence
- Genre: Medical drama
- Directed by: Peter Godfrey; Harry R. Sherman
- Starring: John Howard; Jack Kelly; Olive Blakeney; Cheryl Callaway; Frances Mercer
- Theme music composer: Igor Stravinsky
- Opening theme: Infernal Dance from "The Firebird"
- Country of origin: United States
- Original language: English
- No. of seasons: 2
- No. of episodes: 78

Production
- Producers: Brewster Morgan; Eugene Solow
- Running time: 22–24 minutes

Original release
- Network: Syndication
- Release: November 5, 1955 – November 1, 1957

Dr. Hudson's Secret Journal is an American medical drama television series that aired in syndication from 1955 to 1957. It was based on a 1939 book of the same name by Lloyd C. Douglas, which was a prequel to his 1929 novel Magnificent Obsession. A total of 78 episodes were produced.

Hudson, a neurosurgeon, is a widower who lives with his daughter Kathy and their housekeeper, Mrs. Grady. His work at Center Hospital involves the use of his "strange and rather mysterious gift" to help patients psychologically.

In 1955, a nationwide competition was held in TV Guide to find a young actor to play Dr. Hudson's protege Tim Watson for several episodes. Those entering had to submit a photo and recording in which they would read emotional dialogue. The winner was a young actor named Joe Walker.

== Cast ==
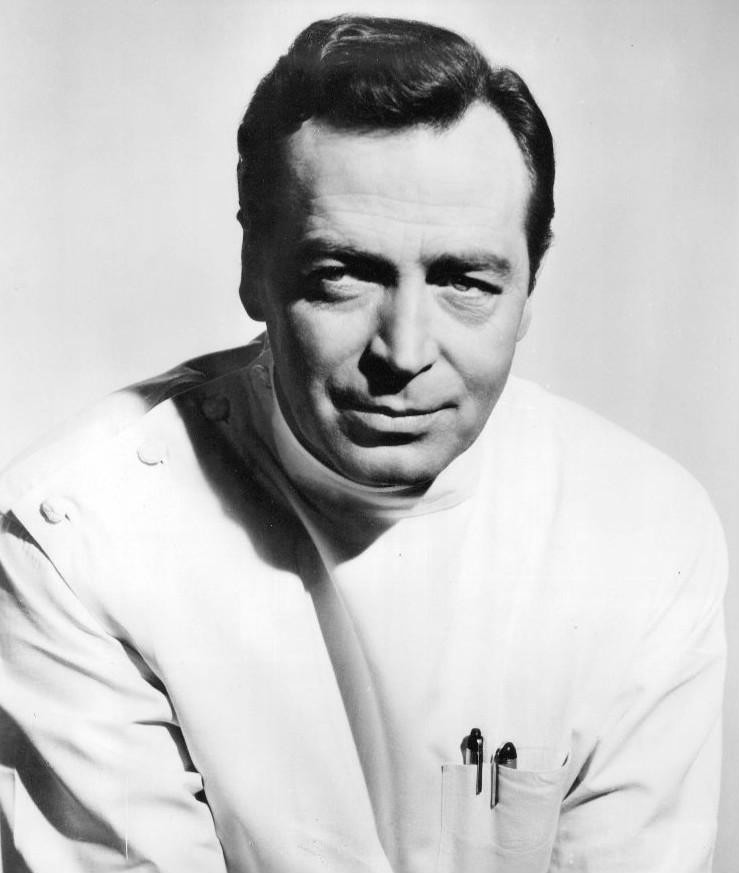
John Howard as Doctor Wayne Hudson, 1955.

- John Howard as Dr. Wayne Hudson
- Cheryl Callaway as Kathy Hudson
- Olive Blakeney as Mrs. Grady
- Frances Mercer as Nurse Ann Talbot
- Jack Kelly as Dr. Bennett
- Florenz Ames as Dr. Follansbee

== Production ==
Brewster Morgan and Eugene Solow were the program's producers. The directors were Peter Godfrey and Harry R. Sherman.
