= Magnificent Obsession (1954 film) =

1954 film by Douglas Sirk

- Theatrical release poster by Reynold Brown
- Directed by: Douglas Sirk
- Screenplay by: Robert Blees
- Adaptation by: Wells Root
- Based on: Magnificent Obsession (1929 novel) by Lloyd C. Douglas; Magnificent Obsession (1935 screenplay); Sarah Y. Mason and Victor Heerman
- Produced by: Ross Hunter
- Starring: Jane Wyman; Rock Hudson; Barbara Rush; Agnes Moorehead; Otto Kruger; Gregg Palmer
- Cinematography: Russell Metty
- Edited by: Milton Carruth
- Music by: Frank Skinner
- Production company: Universal-International
- Distributed by: Universal Pictures
- Release date: August 2, 1954
- Running time: 108 minutes
- Country: United States
- Language: English
- Box office: $5.2 million (US and Canada rentals)

Magnificent Obsession is a 1954 American melodrama film directed by Douglas Sirk and starring Jane Wyman, Rock Hudson, and Barbara Rush. It is a remake of the 1935 film, starring Irene Dunne and Robert Taylor. Both film versions are adapted from the 1929 novel Magnificent Obsession by Lloyd C. Douglas.

Sirk sometimes claimed that the story was based distantly on the Greek legend of Alcestis.

== Plot ==
In 1948, spoiled playboy Bob Merrick behaves recklessly and loses control of his speedboat, crashing it and becoming injured. Rescuers send for the nearest resuscitator, located in Dr. Phillips's house across the lake. While the resuscitator is being used to save Merrick, Phillips suffers a heart attack and dies. Merrick ends up a patient at Phillips's clinic, where the staff members resent that Merrick caused Phillips's death, however inadvertently.

Helen Phillips, Dr. Phillips's widow, receives a flood of calls, letters, and visitors all offering to pay back loans that Dr. Phillips refused to accept repayment of during his life. Many claimed he refused by saying "it was already used up." Edward Randolph, a famous artist and Dr. Phillips's close friend, explains to Helen what that phrase means. This helps her to understand why her husband left little money, even though he had a very successful practice.

Merrick, who had once been a medical student but abandoned his studies, discovers why everyone dislikes him. He runs from the clinic, collapses in front of Helen's car, and ends up back at the hospital, where she learns his connection to her husband's death.

After his discharge, Merrick gets drunk at a party before he drives away. He runs off the road and ends up at the home of Edward Randolph, who explains the secret belief that powered his own art and Dr. Phillips's success. Merrick decides to try this new philosophy. While trying to make up to Helen, she steps into the path of a car to evade him. She is left blind as a result of the accident.

Merrick soberly commits to becoming a doctor, trying to fulfill Dr. Phillips's legacy. He also has fallen in love with Helen. He helps her adjust to her blindness under the guise of being Robby, a poor medical student.

Merrick secretly arranges for Helen to travel to Europe and consult with the best eye surgeons in the world. After extensive tests, these surgeons tell Helen there is no hope for recovery. Soon after this, Robby shows up at her hotel to provide emotional support and discovers that Helen has already guessed his real identity. Merrick asks Helen to marry him. Later that night, Helen realizes she will be a burden to him and runs away.

Many years pass, and Merrick is now a dedicated and successful brain surgeon who secretly continues his philanthropic acts and searches for Helen. One evening, Randolph arrives with news that Helen is very sick, possibly dying, in a small Southwest hospital. Merrick arrives to find that Helen needs complex brain surgery to save her life and performs this operation. After a long night waiting for the results, Helen awakens, discovers that she can see, and reunites with Merrick.

== Cast ==
- Jane Wyman as Helen Phillips
- Rock Hudson as Bob Merrick
- Barbara Rush as Joyce Phillips
- Agnes Moorehead as Nancy Ashford
- Otto Kruger as Ed Randolph
- Gregg Palmer as Tom Masterson
- Paul Cavanagh as Dr. Giraud
- Sara Shane as Valerie
- Richard H. Cutting as Dr. Dodge
- Judy Nugent as Judy
- Helen Kleeb as Mrs. Eden
- Rudolph Anders as Dr. Fuss
- Fred Nurney as Dr. Laradetti
- John Mylong as Dr. Hofer
- Jack Kelly as First Mechanic (uncredited)
- Alexander Campbell as Dr. Allan
- Mae Clarke as Mrs. Miller
- Harvey Grant as Chris
- Joseph Mell as Dan

== Production ==
Sirk began production on Magnificent Obsession, his previous production, Taza, Son of Cochise having wrapped up the month before.

Taza, a 3-D western, also starred Rock Hudson, and it was the second time the two had worked together (the first time being 1952's Has Anybody Seen My Gal). Hudson had previously played leading parts in Universal B-movies, usually directed by Joseph Pevney or Frederick De Cordova.

The screenplay was written by Robert Blees and Wells Root, The film was produced by Ross Hunter.

Among the significant differences between the book and the film are:

- Helen is two years older than Joyce. They went to college together. Helen married Dr. Hudson before graduating. Joyce was a wild youngster who partied with Bobby Merrick and his wild crowd, but Helen has a good influence on her.
- Nancy Ashford plays a much larger role. She is the one who convinces Merrick to do something valuable with his life, and she gives him Dr. Hudson's journal.
- The journal, which Merrick decodes and shares with Nancy, describes the conversations with Randolph that convinced Hudson to adopt his way of life and his own experiences. Randolph has long since passed away.
- Helen and Merrick are separated by a misunderstanding, not an accident that blinds her. Late in the story, she is injured in Europe and needs a difficult surgery to save her life as well as her sight. Merrick performs the surgery and arranges for them to be married on the voyage home.

Pre-production scouting for locations began on August 26, 1953, by director Douglas Sirk, Director of Photography Russell Metty, and Unit Manager Edward K. Dodds. Rehearsals began on September 8. Second-unit footage of locations at Lake Tahoe began filming on September 14. An Unlimited Hydroplane speedboat, "Hurricane IV", was secured for the second unit footage of Hudson's boat. It was shot on Lake Arrowhead and was piloted by racer Bill Cantrell.

Charles Bickford was originally cast in the role of Randolph, but was withdrawn from the cast on September 15. Sirk and Wyman were ill, and Rock Hudson injured, so filming of Magnificent Obsession was delayed longer than Bickford had anticipated. Although the studio and Bickford had come to an oral agreement and trade announcements mentioned Bickford in the role, Bickford had at the same time made an agreement with Warner Bros. for another picture and walked out on Magnificent Obsession when shooting began on the 1954 version of A Star is Born, in which he played studio head, Oliver Niles. Bickford was replaced by free-lance character actor Otto Kruger.

While second-unit footage wrapped at Lake Tahoe, screen tests of Barbara Rush, Rock Hudson, Agnes Moorehead, Jane Wyman, Gigi Perreau, Donna Corcoran, and Sheila James took place on Stage 8 in Universal City on September 16 and 17. Director Sirk was ill, and utility director Joseph Pevney filled in. The next day, Corcoran, Hudson and Judy Nugent were tested by Pevney. Test shots were taken in Lake Arrowhead with the new Cinemascope anamorphic lens process, an early consideration. The production started in a flat widescreen process at an aspect ratio of 2:1, at that time Universal's standard ratio.

Production began on September 21 at Lake Arrowhead with Sirk back in the director's seat.

Frank Skinner composed the score for this film, the theme of which inspired a song of the same title with lyrics by Frederick Herbert. The Four Lads recorded the song with the Percy Faith orchestra. Victor Young also recorded an instrumental version of the song which featured a viola solo by Anatole Kaminsky. However, much of the score is Skinner's arrangements of works by Chopin (Nocturne No. 7 in C-sharp minor, Op. 27, No. 1 and Étude in E major, Op. 10, No. 3 "Tristesse"), Beethoven ("Ode to Joy" theme from 9th Symphony), and Johann Strauss II (Wiener Blut).

== Release and reception ==
Magnificent Obsession opened at Loew's State Theatre in New York City on August 4, 1954. Audiences were greeted by co-star Agnes Moorehead in the lobby.

The film was generally not well received critically but did well at the box office. Howard Thompson in The New York Times of August 5, 1954 wrote "[The film] is unquestionably a handsome one. Better still, generally restrained performances at least dignify a moist text, which may seem inspiration to some, pure corn to others."

Jane Wyman was nominated for Best Actress at the 27th Academy Awards.

On the review aggregator website Rotten Tomatoes, the film holds an approval rating of 88% based on 25 reviews, with an average rating of 7.4/10.
