= Jay Robinson =

American actor (1930–2013)

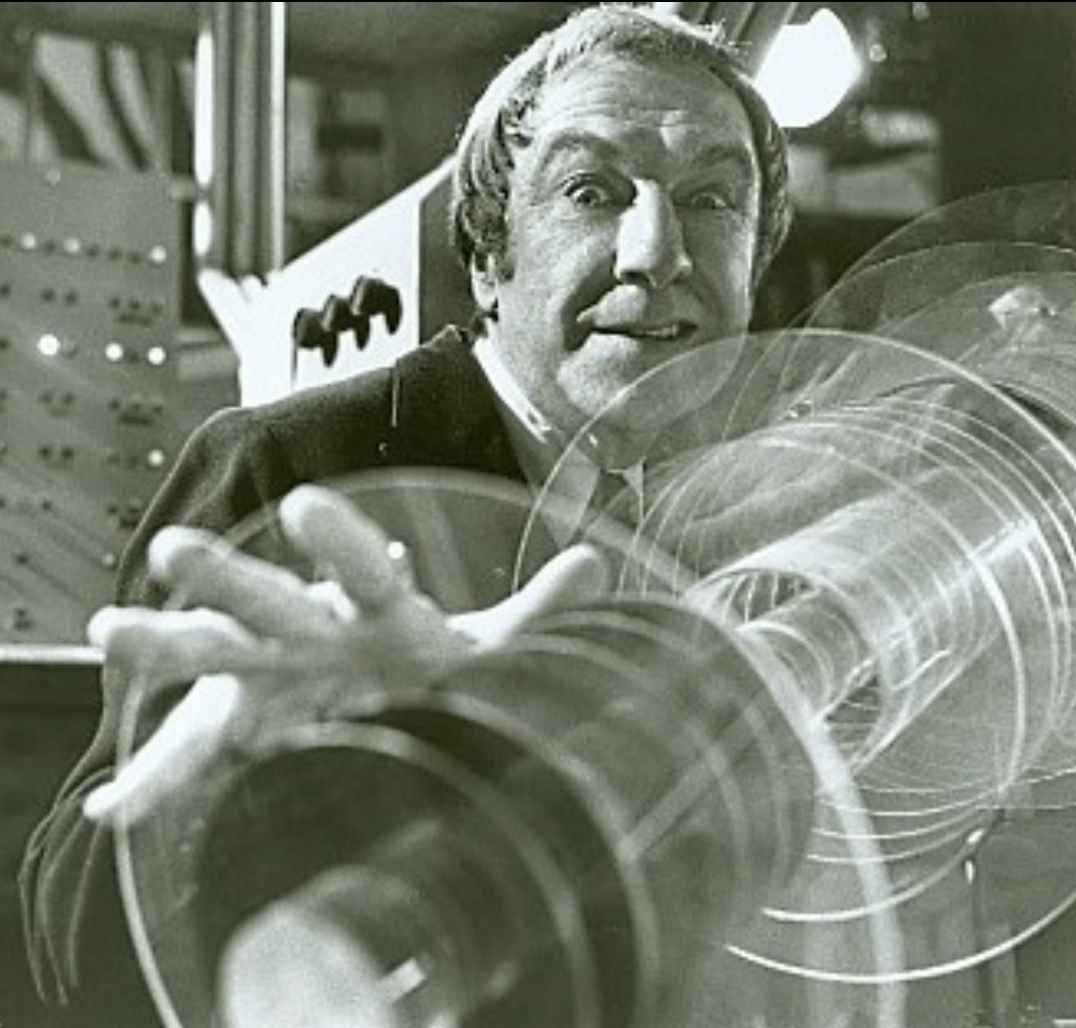
- Robinson as Dr. Shrinker on The Krofft Supershow (1977)
- Born: April 14, 1930; New York City, New York, U.S.
- Died: September 27, 2013 (aged 83); Sherman Oaks, California, U.S.
- Resting place: Forest Lawn Memorial Park, Hollywood Hills, California
- Occupation: Actor
- Years active: 1953–2000
- Spouses: Pauline Flowers (m. 1960; died 2002) Gloria Casas (m. 2004)

Jay Robinson (April 14, 1930 – September 27, 2013) was an American actor specializing in character roles. He achieved his greatest fame playing Emperor Caligula in the film The Robe (1953) and its sequel Demetrius and the Gladiators (1954), and years later portraying the boss of the character played by Warren Beatty in Shampoo (1975).

== Early life ==
Robinson was born in New York City. His mother was a dancer; his father was a director of the Van Heusen Shirt Company. He became interested in acting after discovering a scrapbook of his mother's dance career.

== Career ==
Robinson began his acting career in summer stock theatre and repertory companies, and eventually made his way to the Broadway stage, where he appeared in Shakespeare's As You Like It and Much Ado About Nothing, as well as several other plays by the age of 19. His first film role was as the notorious Emperor Caligula in The Robe (1953), which he reprised in his second film, that movie's sequel Demetrius and the Gladiators (1954).

This was followed by roles in a variety of films, including The Virgin Queen (1955) starring Bette Davis, My Man Godfrey (1957) with David Niven and June Allyson, Woody Allen's comedy Everything You Always Wanted to Know About Sex* (*But Were Afraid to Ask) (1972), and Bram Stoker's Dracula (1992). He also was featured on two Folkways albums of Shakespeare: Othello: William Shakespeare and William Shakespeare: King Richard III, both released in 1964.

Robinson's many television guest spots included Star Trek: The Original Series ("Elaan of Troyius"), The Wild Wild West (Dr. Maitland in "The Night of the Sedgewick Curse"), and Planet of the Apes. He appeared in two episodes of the situation comedy Bewitched, as Julius Caesar (1969) and as Tabitha's tutor, Professor Poindexter Phipps (1970). In 1971 he appeared in one episode of Room 222. He appeared as different characters on five episodes of Mannix between 1968 and 1974, in three episodes of The Waltons (1975–76), and two episodes of Barney Miller, "The Sniper" (1976) and "The Tontine" (1982). He guest-starred as Cassius Thorne in the Buck Rogers in the 25th Century episode "Planet of the Amazon Women" (1979), and on an episode of Tales of the Gold Monkey as the governor in "Last Chance Louie" (1983). He appeared in two episodes of Murder, She Wrote (1987 and 1991), and on Cheers in 1989.

Apart from his guest roles, Robinson starred in the title role on Sid & Marty Krofft's Dr. Shrinker, prominently featured on The Krofft Supershow. Robinson was a regular on the daytime soap opera Days of Our Lives from 1988-1989, playing the role of Monty Dolan.

For the cinema, he played the role of Monroe Feather in the blaxploitation movie Three the Hard Way (1974) starring Jim Brown, Jim Kelly and Fred Williamson. The character Feather was recreated in the movie Undercover Brother. He also appeared in Born Again (1978), the film adaptation of the book of the same title, about Watergate figure, Charles W. Colson. Robinson played Colson's attorney and Dean Jones starred as Colson. During 1974, he played the museum director in a 1975 episode of the ABC supernatural show Kolchak: The Night Stalker titled "Chopper" and a dual role in a Banacek mystery called "Now You See Him, Now You Don't." In 1975, he also played Norman in Shampoo and did a comedic take on Dracula in the pop musical movie Train Ride to Hollywood, starring the R&B band Bloodstone. In 1977, he appeared in the final episode of the situation comedy The Kallikaks. In 1982, he appeared in Partners with Ryan O'Neal and John Hurt.

Before retiring, Robinson was the host and narrator for the Discovery Channel special (and later documentary series) Beyond Bizarre from 1997 to 2000.

== Personal life ==
At age 23, his newfound celebrity, after appearing in The Robe and its sequel Demetrius and the Gladiators, reportedly inflated his ego, and he became extremely difficult to work with.

In addition, the volatile actor began experimenting recklessly with drugs. He was arrested and booked in 1958 for possession of narcotics (methadone). After a trial, he was sentenced to a year in jail, but his conviction was overturned on appeal. Although he was free on bail, the incident and resulting bad publicity ruined his acting career for almost a decade.

After finding work outside the entertainment industry as a cook and landlord, he recovered from his drug addiction and eventually married.

Resuming acting work in obscure bit parts, he had another career relapse when he was forced to spend 15 months in jail after all for an old warrant served on him for unknowingly missing a court date during his earlier retrial. Robinson credited letters of encouragement from friend Bette Davis with helping him find the strength to overcome his problems. She helped him get his first film role in 13 years in 1971's Bunny O'Hare.

Robinson was married twice: to Pauline Flowers from 1960 until her death in 2002 and to Gloria Casas from 2004 until his death. He had one son with Flowers.

== Filmography ==
- The Robe (1953) – Caligula
- Demetrius and the Gladiators (1954) – Caligula
- The Virgin Queen (1955) – Chadwick
- The Wild Party (1956) – Gage Freeposter
- My Man Godfrey (1957) – Vincent
- Tell Me in the Sunlight (1965) – Barber
- Bunny O'Hare (1971) – John C. Rupert
- Everything You Always Wanted to Know About Sex* (*But Were Afraid to Ask) (1972) – The Priest
- This Is a Hijack (1973) – Simon Scott
- Three the Hard Way (1974) – Monroe Feather
- Nightmare Honeymoon (1974) – Ruskin
- Shampoo (1975) – Norman
- Train Ride to Hollywood (1975) – Dracula
- I Wonder Who's Killing Her Now? (1975) – Insane Actor
- Born Again (1978) – David Shapiro
- The Man with Bogart's Face (1980) – Wolf / Zinderneuf
- Partners (1982) – Halderstam
- The Sword and the Sorcerer (1982) – King Charles
- The Malibu Bikini Shop (1986) – Ben
- Big Top Pee-wee (1988) – Cook
- Transylvania Twist (1989) – Uncle Ephram
- Bram Stoker's Dracula (1992) – Mr. Hawkins
- Ghost Ship (1992) – Crusoe – pirate
- Skeeter (1993) – Drake

== Television ==
Year	Show	Role	Notes
1968	Star Trek: The Original Series	Petri	S3:E13, "Elaan of Troyius"
	Wild Wild West	Dr.Maitland	S4:E4, "Night of the Sedgewick Curse"
1969	Bewitched	Julius Caesar	S6:E3, "Samantha's Caesar Salad"
1972	Hawaii Five-O	Ralph Mingo	S4:E20, "Cloth of Gold"
1973	She Lives!	Dr. Mayhill	ABC Movie of the Week
1974	Planet of the Apes (TV series)	Bandor	S1:E6, "Tomorrow's Tide"
1989	Cheers	Larry	S8:E8, "For Real Men Only"
1994	The Nanny	The Maitre'd	S2:E2, "The Playwright"
