= Song of the Islands =

1942 film by Walter Lang

- Theatrical release poster
- Directed by: Walter Lang
- Written by: Joseph Schrank; Robert Pirosh; Robert Ellis; Helen Logan
- Produced by: Darryl F. Zanuck; William LeBaron
- Starring: Betty Grable; Victor Mature
- Cinematography: Ernest Palmer
- Edited by: Robert L. Simpson
- Music by: Alfred Newman
- Distributed by: 20th Century Fox
- Release date: 13 March 1942
- Running time: 76 minutes
- Country: United States
- Language: English
- Box office: $1.4 million (US rentals)

Song of the Islands is a 1942 American musical comedy film starring Betty Grable and Victor Mature. It was directed by Walter Lang and released through 20th Century Fox.

== Plot ==
Dennis O'Brien is an Irish beachcomber who owns a beachfront property on the tiny island of Ahmi-Oni in Hawaii. His daughter Eileen was raised in a Native Hawaiian community, then away to school for three years. Most of the island is part of the Harper Ranch, owned by Jefferson Harper Sr. He has never visited Ahmi-Oni. Jefferson has tried to buy Dennis'' property for years because it could accommodate a pier for the shipment of cattle. However, Dennis has refused every time, wanting to keep his property available for the Hawaiians. Jefferson has a son, Jeff, who has also never visited the island.

The film starts with the happy return of Eileen to Ahmi-Oni. That same day, Jeff arrives on the island by plane, accompanied by his friend from Texas, Rusty Smith. His role has always been to keep Jeff from pursuing women. Jeff and Rusty then meet Eileen, who offers to escort them to the Harper Ranch. Jeff is immediately enamored of Eileen, who lets him think that she is Native Hawaiian

Arriving at the Harper Ranch, Jeff and Rusty are met by foreman John Rodney. Rodney tells them that Eileen is Dennis' daughter and is not Native Hawaiian. Rodney also says that Jeff's father wants to buy Dennis' property. Jeff and Rusty spend the next three weeks on Ahmi-Oni, during which time Jeff and Eileen fall in love. During the same period, Rusty tries to avoid the attention of native singer Palola, while pursuing her cousin Paulani.

Jeff declares his intention to stay on the island and run the Harper Ranch. A disgruntled Rusty tells Rodney, who in turn calls Jefferson. He immediately flies out from Chicago to Hawaii to stop his son's foolishness. Arriving on Ahmi-Oni, Jefferson tells his son that the O'Briens are fortune hunters. However, Jeff insists that his father meet them

The O'Briens then throw a party for the Harpers. Jefferson likes them, but spoils the party by insisting that Dennis sell him the land. Soon harsh words are exchanged. Jeff and Eileen side with their fathers, prompting a breakup. The Harpers leave the party and try to return to the Harper Ranch, but the bridge is washed out during a storm. The Harpers become reluctant overnight guests of the O'Briens. During this sleepover, Jefferson finally becomes friends with Dennis.

Soon after, the local government seizes Dennis's property due to nonpayment of property taxes. Harper buys the land at auction with the intention of allowing the O'Briens to continue living there. He hopes this gesture will reunite Jeff and Eileen. However, without consulting his boss, Rodney sends the O'Briens an eviction notice. Everyone is furious with Jefferson, but he convinces them that the notice was Rodney's doing and that he wants them to stay on the property,

During a luau that evening to celebrate St. Patrick's Day, Rusty, Jefferson and Dennis hatch a plan to reunited Eileen and Jeff. They tell Eileen that Jeff is flying out today. She rushes to the airport, only to see the plane departing. She feels crushed until she reaches the beach and sees that Jeff is there waiting for her. They are reunited, and everyone sings as the families are assured of a peaceful and prosperous future together.

== Cast ==
Betty Grable as Eileen O'Brien

- Betty Grable as Eileen O'Brien
- Victor Mature as Jeff Harper
- Jack Oakie as Rusty Smith
- Thomas Mitchell as Dennis O'Brien
- George Barbier as Jefferson Harper Sr.
- Hilo Hattie as Palola
- Billy Gilbert as Palola's father
- Lillian Porter as Paulani
- Uncredited actors include Filipino actor Rudy Robles as "Akomi", the native boy.

== Background ==
Grable had recently scored major hits with her leading roles for Fox. These films included Down Argentine Way and Tin Pan Alley in 1940 and Moon Over Miami, A Yank in the RAF and I Wake Up Screaming in 1941. After the success of Song of the Islands, Fox kept casting Grable in Technicolor musicals with an increasing salary.

Grable's co star was meant to be John Payne, but he dropped out so as to make To the Shores of Tripoli; he was replaced by Mature. In turn, he had to drop out of Highway to Hell and was replaced by Cesar Romero. Filming of Song of the Islands began on 20 October 1941. Song of the Islands was filmed on location in Hawaii.

In the 1979 film Yanks, set during World War II, there is a larger poster of Song of the Islands on the wall.
