= The Robe (film) =

1953 film by Henry Koster

- Theatrical release poster
- Directed by: Henry Koster
- Screenplay by: Gina Kaus (adaptation); Albert Maltz; Philip Dunne
- Based on: The Robe by Lloyd C. Douglas
- Produced by: Frank Ross
- Starring: Richard Burton; Jean Simmons; Victor Mature; Michael Rennie; Jay Robinson; Dean Jagger; Torin Thatcher; Richard Boone; Betta St. John; Jeff Morrow; Ernest Thesiger; Dawn Addams; Leon Askin
- Cinematography: Leon Shamroy
- Edited by: Barbara McLean
- Music by: Alfred Newman
- Color process: Technicolor
- Distributed by: 20th Century-Fox
- Release dates: September 16, 1953 (Roxy Theatre); September 17, 1953 (New York City)
- Running time: 135 minutes
- Country: United States
- Language: English
- Budget: $4.1 million – $4.6 million
- Box office: $36 million (United States)

The Robe is a 1953 American Biblical epic film that tells the story of a Roman military tribune who commands the unit that is responsible for the crucifixion of Jesus. The film was released by 20th Century-Fox and was the first film released in the widescreen process CinemaScope. Like other early CinemaScope films, The Robe was shot with Henri Chrétien's original Hypergonar anamorphic lenses.

The film was directed by Henry Koster and produced by Frank Ross. The screenplay was adapted from Lloyd C. Douglas's 1942 novel by Gina Kaus, Albert Maltz, and Philip Dunne, although Maltz's place among the blacklisted Hollywood 10 led to his being denied his writing credit for many years. The score was composed by Alfred Newman, and the cinematography was by Leon Shamroy. The film stars Richard Burton, Jean Simmons, Victor Mature and Michael Rennie, and co-stars Jay Robinson, Dean Jagger, Torin Thatcher, Richard Boone, Betta St. John, Jeff Morrow, Ernest Thesiger, and others.

A sequel, Demetrius and the Gladiators (1954), continues from where The Robe ends.

== Plot ==
On the way to a slave auction, Marcellus Gallio, a Roman military tribune and senator's son, helps recapture Demetrius, a defiant Greek slave. At the auction site, Marcellus is reunited with Diana, his childhood love, who is now a ward of Emperor Tiberius and has been pledged in marriage to the regent Caligula. Marcellus has a longstanding feud with Caligula, and he outbids Caligula for Demetrius, who does not attempt to escape again, as he feels honor-bound to Marcellus. Demetrius becomes Marcellus' personal servant.

That evening, Caligula vengefully transfers Marcellus to far-flung Jerusalem. Diana goes to the port to say she will appeal to Tiberius on Marcellus' behalf, and the pair pledge their love and reaffirm their youthful promise to marry one day.

Accompanied by Demetrius and the centurion Paulus, Marcellus arrives in Jerusalem on the same day that Jesus, who is being hailed as the Messiah, enters the city. Demetrius feels compelled to follow Jesus and later attempts to warn him of a plot against him, but a distraught man tells Demetrius that Jesus has already been arrested.

Pontius Pilate, the governor of Judaea, informs Marcellus that he has been recalled by order of Tiberius, and gives Marcellus his last task, which is to handle the execution of three criminals—one of whom is Jesus. Marcellus wins Jesus' robe from Paulus in a dice game on Calvary, but when he uses it to shield himself from rain, he feels a sudden, intense pain. Grabbing the robe, Demetrius denounces Marcellus and the Roman Empire and frees himself, leaving a mentally unstable Marcellus, who is haunted by nightmares of the crucifixion, to report to Tiberius at Capri alone. The emperor's soothsayer says the robe must be cursed, so Tiberius gives Marcellus an imperial commission to find and destroy the robe, as well as identify the followers of Jesus. At Diana's request, Tiberius leaves her free to marry Marcellus once he has successfully completed his mission.

Marcellus eventually makes his way to Cana, whose inhabitants experienced Jesus' miracles and believe he rose from the dead. Learning from Justus, a kind weaver, that Demetrius is in the town, Marcellus confronts his former slave at an inn. Demetrius says the robe has no real power, and it is Marcellus' guilt over killing Jesus that is causing his illness. When Marcellus tries to destroy the robe anyway, he is overcome, and finds himself healed.

Following the order of Pilate to arrest of all of the Christian "fanatics", Paulus sneaks into Cana with his troops. After Justus is killed by a surprise arrow, Marcellus manages to halt the attack, but Paulus informs him that Caligula has succeeded Tiberius as emperor, making Marcellus' commission no longer valid. Paulus initially refuses Marcellus' order to leave the town, but he complies after Marcellus beats him in a duel. Jesus' apostle Peter invites Marcellus to join him and Demetrius as missionaries, and, after confessing his role in Jesus' death, Marcellus pledges his life to Jesus.

When Peter's missionary group comes to Rome, Demetrius is captured and tortured for information. Caligula asks Diana if she has heard from Marcellus, and, as she has not, he tells her of Marcellus' involvement with the Christians. The Gallios' slave Marcipor, who is secretly a Christian, shows Diana where Marcellus is hiding, shortly before Marcellus leads a raid to rescue Demetrius. Demetrius is brought to the house of Senator Gallio, where Peter miraculously heals his grievous wounds. Marcellus and Demetrius attempt to flee the city, but horsemen dispatched by Caligula pick up their trail, and Marcellus gives himself up so Demetrius can escape.

At his trial, Marcellus admits to being a follower of Jesus, but denies that the Christians are plotting against Rome. He is condemned to death, unless he renews his tribune's oath of loyalty to the emperor and renounces his allegiance to Jesus; while he does the former, he refuses to do the latter. Diana stands with Marcellus and denounces Caligula, who declares that the couple will die together. As they depart the courtroom, Diana hands Jesus' robe to Marcipor, telling him to give it to Peter. Marcellus and Diana are led away to be executed and thus begin eternal life together in Heaven – the kingdom of their true king.

== Cast ==
=== Credited ===
- Richard Burton as Marcellus Gallio
- Jean Simmons as Diana
- Victor Mature as Demetrius
- Michael Rennie as Peter
- Jay Robinson as Caligula
- Dean Jagger as Justus
- Torin Thatcher as Senator Gallio
- Richard Boone as Pontius Pilate
- Betta St. John as Miriam
- Jeff Morrow as Centurion Paulus
- Ernest Thesiger as Emperor Tiberius
- Dawn Addams as Junia (called "Livia" by Marcellus)
- Leon Askin as Abidor

=== Uncredited ===
- Frank de Kova as the twins' slave dealer
- Jay Novello as Tiro, Demetrius' slave dealer
- Guy Prescott (credited in publicity as Frank Pulaski) as Tribune Quintus
- Hayden Rorke as Calvus, a bidder at the slave auction
- Marc Snow as the auctioneer
- David Leonard as Marcipor, the head slave of the Gallio household
- Sally Corner as Cornelia Gallio, Marcellus' mother
- Pamela Robinson as Lucia Gallio, Marcellus' sister
- Donald C. Klune as Jesus
- Percy Helton as Caleb, a wine merchant
- Michael Ansara as Judas
- Cameron Mitchell as the voice of Jesus
- John Doucette as the ship's mate spooked by Marcellus' nightmares
- Rosalind Ivan as Empress Julia
- Anthony Eustrel as Sarpedon, Tiberius' royal physician
- Francis Pierlot as Dodinius, Tiberius' royal soothsayer
- Nicolas Koster as Jonathan, Justus' grandson
- Harry Shearer as David, the crippled boy in Cana
- Thomas Browne Henry as Marius, Demetrius' physician

== Historical inaccuracies ==
Despite the careful attention to Roman history and culture displayed in the film, there are some inaccuracies. For example, in reality, Emperor Tiberius' wife, Julia, who had been banished from Rome by her father Augustus years before Tiberius acceded to the imperial throne, was already dead at the time of Jesus' crucifixion. Unlike in the Gospels, the centurion at the crucifixion does not recognise Jesus as the Son of God or son of a god.

Also, Caligula did not systematically persecute Christians, as depicted in the film. The first recorded persecution of Christians organized by the Roman government was under the emperor Nero in 64 AD after the Great Fire of Rome and took place entirely within the city of Rome.

== Background and production ==
In 1942, producer Frank Ross acquired the rights to Douglas' novel—before it was completed—for $100,000. Development of the film began at RKO Radio Pictures in the 1940s, with Mervyn LeRoy set to direct, but the rights were eventually sold to 20th Century-Fox for $300,000, plus $650,000 from future profits; Ross received $40,000, plus 20% of the profits.

Jeff Chandler was originally announced for the role of Demetrius. Victor Mature signed in December 1952 to make both The Robe and a sequel about Demetrius. John Buckmaster tested for the role of Caligula. Jean Peters was originally cast as Diana, but she became pregnant and was replaced by Jean Simmons. Interestingly, the film's poster, which had already been designed, was not changed, and therefore shows the wrong "Jean" between the likenesses of Burton and Mature.

Filming finished on April 30, 1953, two weeks ahead of schedule. Since many theaters were not equipped to screen films shot in the new CinemaScope process, each scene of The Robe was shot both with and without CinemaScope's anamorphic lenses, resulting in there being two versions of the film: a "scope" version and a "flat" version. Setups and some dialogue differ between the versions, as the takes for each process were filmed back-to-back rather than simultaneously. For decades, the flat version of the film was the one typically shown on television, as its 1.33:1 aspect ratio would fill the then-standard television screens. American Movie Classics may have been the first channel to broadcast the scope version of the film. Recent DVD and Blu-ray releases of the film present it in the 2.55:1 widescreen format, and also feature the original multitrack stereophonic soundtrack.

The film was advertised as "The modern miracle you see without glasses!", a dig at the 3D films of the day.

=== Preservation ===
The Academy Film Archive preserved The Robe in 2008.

== Release ==
The Robe was due to open at Radio City Music Hall in New York City, but the Hall would not drop its stage show for the film's planned run, so the film instead premiered at the Roxy Theatre in New York City on September 16, 1953. It opened to the public at the Roxy the following day.

=== First telecast ===
ABC paid a record $2 million to screen the film on television in the United States four times. Sponsored by Ford, The Robe was first telecast on Sunday, March 26, 1967 (Easter), at the relatively early hour of 7:00 P.M. EST to allow for family viewing. It was shown with only one commercial break, a luxury not even granted to the then-annual telecasts of The Wizard of Oz (1939), and received a Nielsen rating of 31.0 and an audience share of 53%, which translated to 60 million viewers, the second largest TV audience for a film, behind The Bridge on the River Kwai (1957).

=== Home media ===
The film was released on VHS and DVD on October 16, 2001. It was released on Blu-ray on March 17, 2009.

=== Soundtrack ===
When the film's original soundtrack album was issued on LP by Decca Records, it featured a monaural remix of the score, rather than the stereo sound that was originally recorded. MCA Records, which acquired the rights to the American Decca recordings, later issued an electronic stereo version of the mono tape. In 2003, Varèse Sarabande released a two-CD set of the film's original stereophonic score on its club label.

RCA Victor included a suite from the film—recorded in Dolby surround sound—on its 1973 album Captain from Castile, which honored the film's composer, longtime Fox musical director Alfred Newman. Charles Gerhardt conducted London's National Philharmonic Chorus for the recording.

== Reception ==
=== Box office ===
The Robe set a record one-day gross (for a single theatre) of $36,000 at the Roxy, on its way to a record one-week gross (for a single theatre) of $264,427. In its second week of release, it expanded to Los Angeles, Chicago, and Philadelphia and grossed $490,000, placing it at number one at the US box office, setting box office records at each location; it more than doubled the previous record at Grauman's Chinese Theatre in Los Angeles, with a gross of $80,000. The film gradually expanded to 44 locations by the end of October, and remained number one at the box office for nine straight weeks. Its fourth week of release, Variety reported that the film had a weekly gross of $1,026,000 from 16 cities that it sampled, a record gross for a week.

The film earned an estimated $17.5 million in theatrical rentals in the United States and Canada during its initial theatrical release. Its worldwide rentals were estimated at $32 million.

=== Critical reception ===
Critical reaction of the film and CinemaScope following the premiere in New York was generally favorable. In his review of the film, Frank Quinn of the New York Daily Mirror called CinemaScope "a new realistic and phenomenal concept of the art of motion picture production." Kate Cameron of the New York Daily News claimed, in an eight-star review (four stars for the film and four for CinemaScope), that "any picture projected on a flat screen...is going to seem dull" after The Robe. Variety wrote: "It is a 'big' picture in every sense of the word. One magnificent scene after another, under the anamorphic technique, unveils the splendor that was Rome and the turbulence that was Jerusalem at the time of Christ on Calvary." Bosley Crowther of The New York Times was more critical, writing: "The human drama of this story of Christian conversion occurs amid sumptuous and scenic surroundings and are mighty impressive to see. But the mightiness of surroundings—the spectacle of settings and costumes—is meaningful only in relation to the story that is being told. And the story in this instance is not spectacular, so that the amplitude of its surroundings does not enhance its scope."

Edwin Schallert of the Los Angeles Times stated that the film was in "a class that is unique, deeply spiritual and even awe-inspiring," though Richard L. Coe of The Washington Post wrote that, "Partly through the writing, partly through the variety of acting styles, this reverence does not stir the emotions. It is very hard to take seriously a film which presents so petulantly obvious a performance as Jay Robinson's sophomoric Caligula or a script which early observes: 'You have made me the laughing stock of Rome.' These and matters like them are not aspects of fine motion picture making." Harrison's Reports called the film "Excellent!" It continues: "Even if it had been produced in the conventional 2-D form, Lloyd C. Douglas' powerful novel of the birth of Christianity in the days of ancient Rome would have made a great picture, but having been produced in the revolutionary CinemaScope process, it emerges as not only a superior dramatic achievement but also as a spectacle that will electrify audiences with its overpowering scope and magnitude." The Monthly Film Bulletin called the film "a routine addition to the numerous Hollywood Biblical films," which presents "a characteristically distorted and simplified view of Imperial Rome, with a ranting Caligula, a doddering Tiberius, and the customary scenes of 'spectacle' in the palace, the marketplace and the torture chamber. The performances lack enthusiasm, and Richard Burton in particular seems ill at ease as the morose Marcellus." Basil Wright wrote in Sight & Sound: "As a film on a religious subject, Henry Koster's The Robe has rather fewer lapses in taste than most of its predecessors. If the actual speaking of Christ's cry from the Cross is a major error, it is not multiplied. In general, the subject is treated with reasonable reverence and is a deal better than Quo Vadis, which was a perfect illustration of Aristotle's remark about the ludicrous being merely a sub-division of the ugly."

On the review aggregator website Rotten Tomatoes, 74% of 66 critics' reviews of the film are positive, with an average rating of 5.5/10.

=== Awards and honors ===
==== 26th Academy Awards ====
===== Wins =====
- Best Art Direction (Color) – Art Direction: Lyle R. Wheeler, George Davis; Set Decoration: Walter M. Scott, Paul S. Fox
- Best Costume Design (Color) – Charles LeMaire, Emile Santiago

===== Nominations =====
- Best Motion Picture – Producer: Frank Ross
- Best Actor – Richard Burton
- Best Cinematography (Color) – Leon Shamroy

==== 11th Golden Globe Awards ====
===== Wins =====
- Best Motion Picture – Drama

== Sequel ==
The film's successful and highly praised sequel, Demetrius and the Gladiators (1954), featured Victor Mature in the title role; Michael Rennie, Jay Robinson, and David Leonard also reprise their roles from The Robe. Filming of the sequel was completed before The Robe was released, and it begins with Caligula's challenge to Marcellus and Diana as they climb the stairs to their execution at the end of this film.

== Popular culture references ==
In the first episode of the 2020 miniseries The Queen's Gambit, The Robe is playing for the staff and wards of the Mathuen orphanage, and the film's final chorus of "Alleluia" provides a diegetic source of music while Beth breaks into the dispensary and overdoses.

== See also ==
- List of Easter films
