= Victor Mature =

American actor (1913–1999)

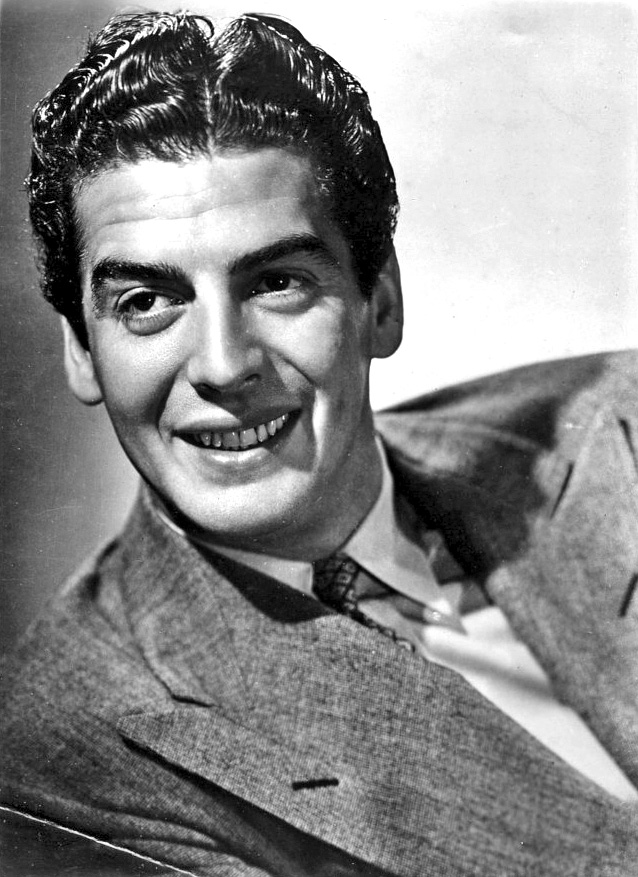
- Mature c. 1940s
- Born: Victor John Mature; January 29, 1913; Louisville, Kentucky, U.S.
- Died: August 4, 1999 (aged 86); Rancho Santa Fe, California, U.S.
- Resting place: St. Michael's Cemetery, Louisville, U.S.
- Occupation: Actor
- Years active: 1939–1984
- Spouses: Frances Charles (m. 1938; annul. 1940) Martha Stephenson Kemp (m. 1941; div. 1943) Dorothy Standford Berry (m. 1948; div. 1955) Adrienne Joy Urwick (m. 1959; div. 1969) Loretta Gaye Sebena (m. 1974)
- Children: 1

Victor John Mature (January 29, 1913 – August 4, 1999) was an American stage, film, and television actor who was a leading man in Hollywood during the 1940s and 1950s. His best known film roles include One Million B.C. (1940), My Darling Clementine (1946), Kiss of Death (1947), Samson and Delilah (1949), and The Robe (1953). He also appeared in many musicals opposite such stars as Rita Hayworth and Betty Grable.

== Early life ==
Victor Mature was born on January 29, 1913, in Louisville, Kentucky. His father, Marcello Gelindo Maturi (changing his name later to Marcellus George Mature), was a cutler and knife sharpener. He immigrated from Pinzolo, in the County of Tyrol in Austria-Hungary (present day Italy). His mother, Clara P. (Ackley), was born in Kentucky and was of Swiss heritage. An older brother, Marcellus Paul Mature, died of osteomyelitis in 1918 at age 11. His only sister, Isabelle, was born in 1906 and died that year.

Victor Mature attended St. Xavier High School in Louisville, Kentucky, the Kentucky Military Institute in Lyndon, Kentucky, and the Spencerian Business School. As a teenager, he sold butcher supplies for his father. Mature briefly sold candy and operated a restaurant before moving to Southern California.

== Career ==
=== Pasadena Playhouse ===
Mature studied and acted in productions at the Pasadena Community Playhouse in Pasadena, California. For three years, he lived in a tent in the backyard of the mother of a fellow student. While acting in a production of To Quito and Back, Mature was spotted by Charles R. Rogers, an agent for the filmmaker Hal Roach. Rogers called Mature "...a rival to Clark Gable, Robert Taylor and Errol Flynn." Mature signed a seven-year contract with Roach in September 1939.

=== Hal Roach ===
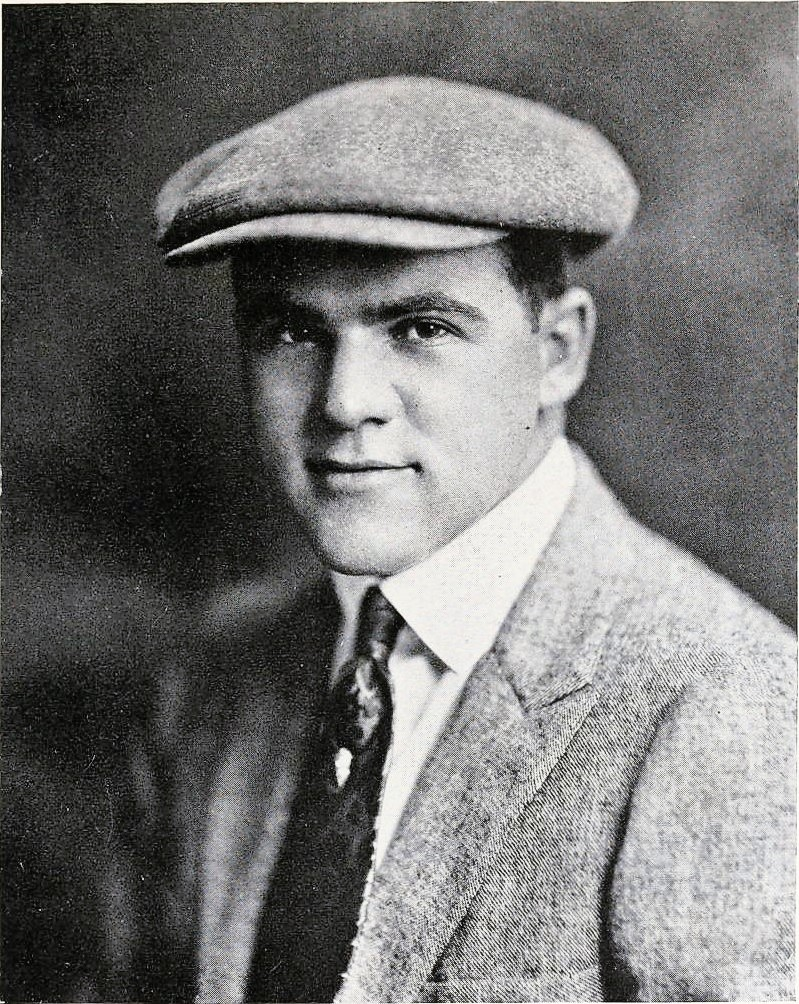
Hal Roach (1920)

Roach then cast Mature in a small role in the United Artists (UA) film The Housekeeper's Daughter (1939). One reviewer called him "a handsome Tarzan type". Roach then gave Mature his first leading role, as a caveman in the UA film One Million B.C. (1940). It was highly publicized and raised Mature's profile; the columnist Hedda Hopper called him "a sort of miniature Johnny Weissmuller". Roach next cast Mature in another UA action film, Captain Caution (1940).

Because Roach only produced a handful of movies every year, he loaned out Mature's services to RKO Pictures. They cast him as a leading man with Anna Neagle in musical No, No, Nanette (1940), produced by Herbert Wilcox. RKO was so pleased with Mature's performance that they bought an option from Roach to take over half of Mature's contract. This move gave RKO the right to use Mature in two films a year over three years. Wilcox wanted to reunite Mature with Neagle in the RKO film Sunny (1941). Roach also announced that Mature would support Victor McLaglen in the UA film, Broadway Limited (1941). However, Mature was not cast in either film.

=== Lady in the Dark ===
By late 1940, Mature was worried about the direction of his career. He later claimed that "nobody was going to believe I could do anything except grunt and groan." Mature decided to go to New York City to try the theatre. He signed to appear in Retreat to Pleasure, a play written by Irwin Shaw and staged by the Group Theatre. However, it never happened; Mature instead was signed for the Broadway musical Lady in the Dark. It was based on a book by Moss Hart, with songs composed by Ira Gershwin and Kurt Weill. Mature played "Randy Curtis", the film star boyfriend of magazine editor Liza Elliott, acted by Gertrude Lawrence. Mature later described his role:

First, this secretary came out saying 'What a beautiful hunk of man!' Then Danny Kaye topped that with a long, long introductory number. Finally, I made my entrance. John Barrymore told me I was the only person who could have followed up on all that.

Lady in the Dark debuted on Broadway in January 1941 and was a critical success. The theater critic Brooks Atkinson of The New York Times called Mature "unobjectionably handsome and affable". The description of Randy Curtis in the musical – "Beautiful Hunk of Man" – would be frequently used to describe Mature throughout his career. Mature missed some performances due to an emergency appendectomy, but played Curtis until the play closed in June 1941.

=== 20th Century Fox ===
Mature and Betty Grable, I Wake Up Screaming

Mature returned to film work in 1941 in the UA film, The Shanghai Gesture, for producer Arnold Pressburger and director Josef von Sternberg.The Shanghai Gesture was a success. Under Mature's contract with Roach, he only received $450 a week for shooting Shanghai Gesture. In contrast, Roach received $3750 a week for Mature's services. Roach received $22,000 for Mature in Song of the Islands, but Mature received only $4,000. Roach then asked for a pay increase of $1,250 a week.

In November 1941, Fox bought out the four years remaining on Mature's contract with Roach for $80,000. Roach did not wanted to sell the Mature contract, but he needed the money. Under the Fox contract, Mature would be paid $1,500 a week. The contract also included six film commitments with RKO. "The studio [Fox] will have to make a success of me," Mature said. His first film under his new contract was to be Bowery Nightingale with Alice Faye, but it was not made. Fox instead teamed Mature and Grable in the thriller I Wake Up Screaming (1941). It was also a popular success.

Fox next announced that Mature would start in the musical, Highway to Hell, but it was postponed. Fox instead replaced John Payne with Mature to co-star with Grable in the musical, Song of the Islands (1942). Cesar Romero took the role on Highway to Hell. RKO wanted Mature for Passage to Bordeaux and von Sternberg wanted him for Lady Paname. Instead, Mature made another musical for Fox, supporting Rita Hayworth in My Gal Sal (1942).

"I wasn't pampered the way a Tyrone Power was," Mature recalled later of his time at Fox. "Zanuck would say, 'If you're not careful, I'll give you Mature for your next picture'." Fox talked of reuniting Hayworth and Mature in a war film, Ski Patrol. Instead, Mature was lent to RKO for a musical with Lucille Ball, Seven Days' Leave (1942). This was followed by Footlight Serenade with Grable and Payne. All of these films were very popular at the box office.

=== World War II ===
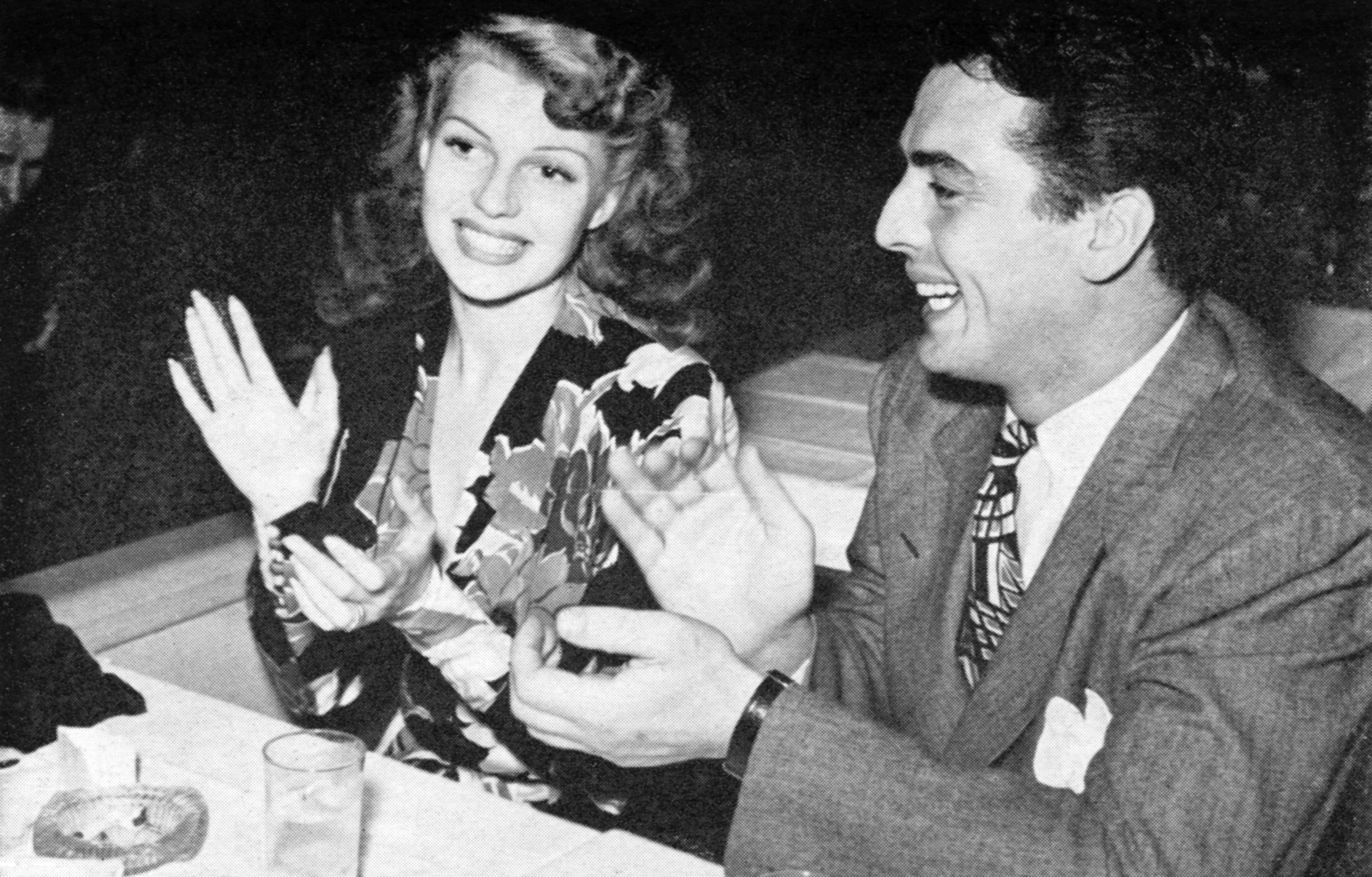
Rita Hayworth and Mature, 1942

In July 1942, after the American entry into World War II, Mature attempted to enlist in the U.S. Navy, but was rejected for color blindness. He was able to enlist in the U.S. Coast Guard after taking a different eye test the same day. The Coast Guard assigned Mature to the USCGC Storis, an icebreaker on the Greenland Patrol. When Paramount created a film adaptation of Lady in the Dark in 1944, Mature was unable to reprise his stage role. After 14 months aboard the Storis, the Coast Guard promoted Mature to chief boatswain's mate.

In 1944, Mature participated in a series of war bond tours around the United States and acted in morale-boosting shows. He assisted Coast Guard recruiting efforts by acting in the musical revue Tars and Spars, which opened in Miami, Florida, in April 1944. The revue toured the United States for the next year. In May 1945, the Coast Guard reassigned Mature to the USS Admiral H. T. Mayo, a transport ship moving American troops from Europe to the Pacific Theater. After the end of World War II in September 1945, the Coast Guard honorably discharged Mature from service November 1945.

=== Resumption of career ===
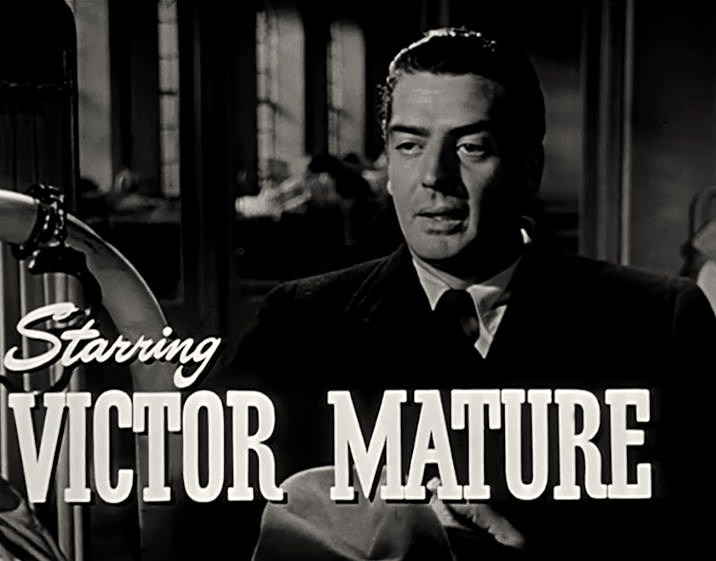
Mature in the trailer for Cry of the City

Back in California, Mature in December 1945 signed a new two-year contract with Fox. Fox assigned him to the musical Three Little Girls in Blue, then removed him to play detective "Philip Marlowe" in an adaptation of The High Window by Raymond Chandler. However, Mature withdrew from The High Window. Director John Ford then cast Mature as the gambler "Doc Holliday" in the Fox western My Darling Clementine, playing Doc Holliday, co-starring with Henry Fonda as Marshall Wyatt Earp. Fox production head Darryl Zanuck considered it to be one of Mature's finest performances. Speaking of Mature to Ford, Zanuck said:

Personally, I think the guy has been one of the most under-rated performers in Hollywood. The public is crazy about him and strangely enough every picture that he has been in has been a big box-office hit. Yet, the Romanoff round table has refused to take him seriously as an actor. A part like Doc Holiday will be sensational for him and I agree with you that the peculiar traits of his personality are ideal for a characterisation such as this.

Zanuck promised Mature that he would not assign him to anymore musicals. Mature was then cast in the period thriller Moss Rose (1947) and received a $50,000 bonus after shooting ended. His next film was the film noir with Coleen Gray, Kiss of Death (1947), which had been developed specifically as a vehicle for him.

While still at Fox, Mature replaced John Payne in the Western Fury at Furnace Creek, (1948) co-starring with Gray. Fox announced plans to team them for a third time in a remake of the 1937 film Seventh Heaven, but it did not materialize. Instead, he costarred with Richard Conte in Cry of the City, (1948), a thriller directed by Robert Siodmak. Mature's performance as "Lt. Vittorio Candella", a world-weary cop. was widely praised; one reviewer noted that he "turns in an excellent performance, arguably the best of his career."

Mature still had a pre-war obligation to make a film at RKO. He was announced for the war film Battleground before being cast in Interference, a serious drama about football that would become Easy Living in 1949, starring Lucille Ball. It was a failure at the box office.

=== Samson and Delilah ===
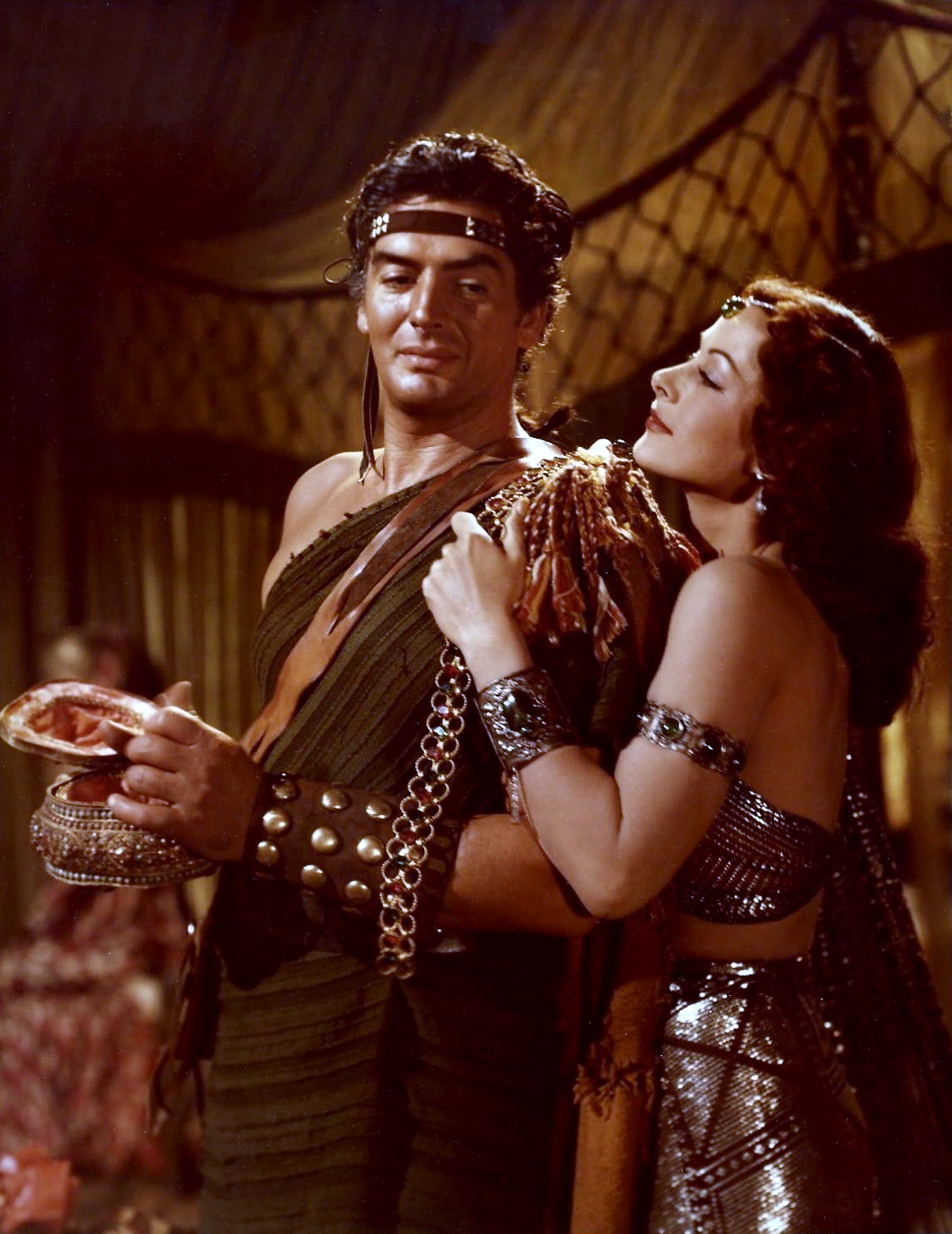
Mature with Hedy Lamarr in Samson and Delilah (1949)

Mature's career received a massive lift when he was borrowed by filmmaker Cecil B. DeMille at Paramount Pictures to play the lead in the $3.5 million biblical spectacular Samson and Delilah (1949). De Mille described the character "Samson" as “a combination Tarzan, Robin Hood, and Superman.” Mature was reluctant to take the role as he wanted to protect his new reputation as a serious actor. However, he ultimately changed his mind and took the role of Samson.

During filming, Mature was frightened by a number of the animals and mechanical props used in the production. These included the lions, the wind machine, the swords and even the water. On one occasion, Mature's phobias so infuriated DeMille that he bellowed through his megaphone at the assembled cast and crew:

“I have met a few men in my time. Some have been afraid of heights, some have been afraid of water, some have been afraid of fire, some have been afraid of closed spaces. Some have even been afraid of open spaces – or themselves. But in all my 35 years of picture-making experience, Mr. Mature, I have not until now met a man who was 100 percent yellow.”

While Samson was in post-production, Paramount used Mature in another film, co-starring with Betty Hutton in Red, Hot and Blue (1949), his first musical in several years. The film was not particularly popular. In contrast, Samson and Delilah earned over $12 million during its original run, making it the most popular movie of the 1940s. The film ushered in a series of films set in ancient Rome, Greece and Palestine.

Mature appeared again with Grable in the musical Wabash Avenue (1950). It was directed by Henry Koster who recalled Mature was "nice to work with, amusing. He very much looked out for his money always."

=== RKO ===
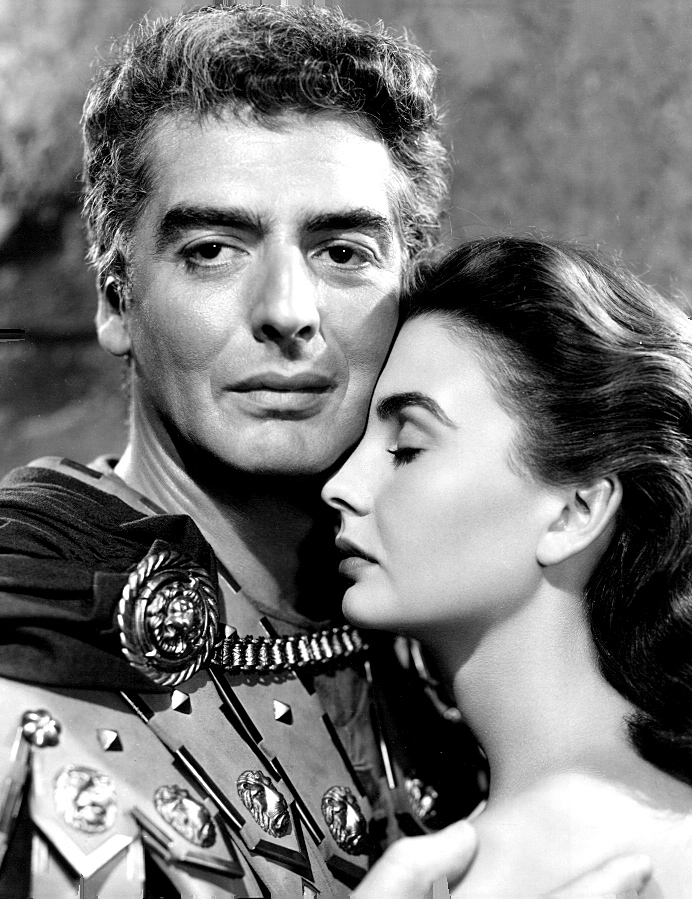
Mature with Jean Simmons in Androcles and the Lion (1952)

In late 1949, Mature was meant to fulfill another commitment at RKO, Alias Mike Fury (the new title for Mr Whiskers). Mature refused to make the movie and was suspended by Fox. After the script was rewritten, Mature agreed to make the film, which was retitled Gambling House (1951)

Back at Fox, he supported Ann Sheridan in a comedy, Stella (1950). In September 1950, he was making a film in Montana about firefighters, Wild Winds, for Fox with John Lund. Mature was injured in a motorcycle accident. After Lund was stung by a wasp and the location was snowed in, Fox abandoned the film.

Mature took a number of months off, before returning to filmmaking with The Las Vegas Story, with Jane Russell at RKO. RKO released – but did not produce – Mature's next film, Androcles and the Lion, an adaptation of the play by George Bernard Shaw with Mature as a Roman centurion. Like Las Vegas Story, it was a box-office failure.

Far more popular was a musical Mature made at MGM, Million Dollar Mermaid with Esther Williams. It was a biopic of the swimmer Annette Kellermann, with Mature playing her promoter husband. According to Williams's autobiography, she and Mature had a romantic relationship.

Fox then planned to reunite Mature with Grable in a musical, The Farmer Takes a Wife. However, the studio reassigned him to a comedy with Patricia Neal, Something for the Birds (1952). RKO originally plan to put Mature in the thriller Split Second, but instead paired him with Jean Simmons in the romantic drama Affair with a Stranger (1953) RKO then cast Mature in a Korean War film, The Glory Brigade (1953). He followed this with a film at Universal Pictures, The Veils of Bagdad. Universal delayed its release until after Mature's next film, The Robe.

=== The Robe ===
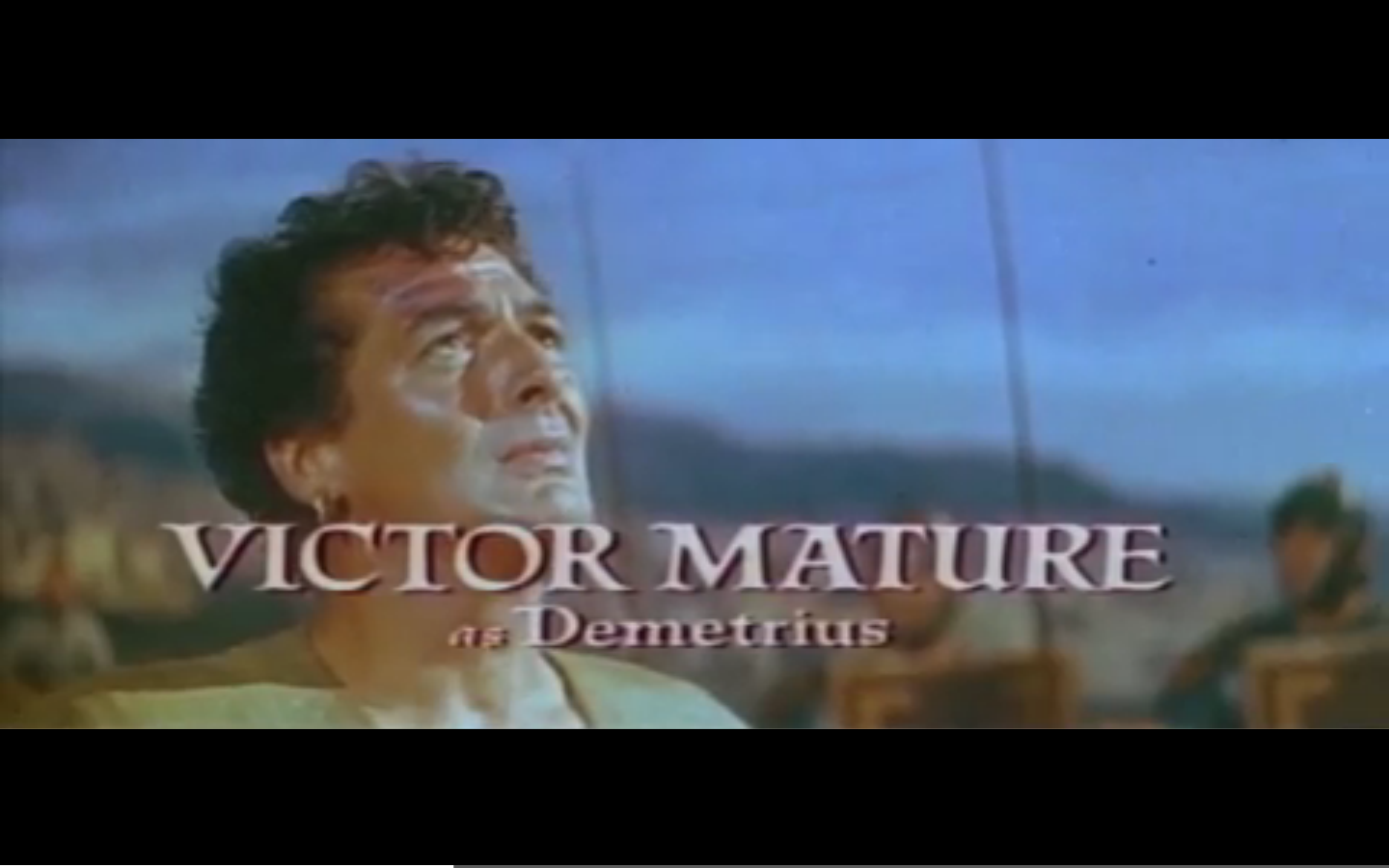
Mature in the trailer for The Robe

The Robe had been in development in Hollywood for over a decade. In December 1952, Mature signed with Fox to play "Demetrius" in two movies, The Robe and its sequel, Demetrius and the Gladiators. The two films were shot consecutively.

The Robe, the first CinemaScope movie to be released was an enormous success, becoming one of the most popular movies of all time. Veils of Bagdad was not as popular, but Demetrius and the Gladiators was another hit.

Back at RKO, Mature made Dangerous Mission (1954) with Piper Laurie for producer Irwin Allen. He travelled to the Netherlands in September 1953 to support Clark Gable and Lana Turner in a World War II film at MGM, Betrayed (1954) another popular success.

Fox put Mature into another ancient history spectacle with Simmons, The Egyptian. Mature renewed his contract with Fox for another year, his 12th at that studio. The Egyptian was a box-office disappointment. Mature went over to Universal to play the title role in the western Chief Crazy Horse (1955) in exchange for a fee and a percentage of the profits.

=== End of contract with Fox ===
Fox wanted Mature to support Tyrone Power and Susan Hayward in the western Untamed (1955). However, Mature refused, claiming he had worked for two years and wanted a vacation. The studio replaced him with Richard Egan and put him under what they called a "friendly" suspension.

In 1954, Mature signed a two-picture deal with Columbia Pictures, giving him script and co-star approval, at $200,000 a film. The first movie he made under this contract was the western The Last Frontier (1955). Before he started making that, however, he was called back to Fox to appear in the heist thriller, Violent Saturday (1955) This was the last movie he made at Fox.

=== United Artists and Warwick Productions ===
In March 1955, while making Last Frontier, Mature announced he had also signed a contract with UA for them to finance and distribute six films over five years for Mature's own production company.

In May 1955, Mature signed a two-picture contract with Warwick Productions. Warwick was an English company that had success making films aimed at the international market with American stars; they released their films in the United States through Columbia Pictures. The first of Mature's films for Warwick was the action films Zarak (1956). He ended up making Safari (1956 ) beforehand, a story about the Mau Mau rebellion in Kenya in the 1950s. It was filmed on location in Kenya. Both Safari and Zarak were successful.

The producer Samuel Goldwyn Jr. hired Mature to make The Sharkfighters (1956), released through UA and shot on location in Cuba. He was back with Warwick for Interpol (1957), reteaming him with his Zarak co-star, Anita Ekberg, filmed in locations throughout Europe. In London, he made The Long Haul (1957), a truck-driver drama with Diana Dors, the second film under his deal with Columbia.

Mature finally made a movie for his own production company, Romina Productions, in conjunction with UA and Batjac Productions: China Doll (1958), directed by Frank Borzage, with Mature as co-producer. Mature and Borzage announced they would also make The Incorrigibles and Vaults of Heaven.

Mature signed to make two more films with Warwick Productions, No Time to Die (Tank Force) (1958) and The Man Inside. It was a World War II film that was shoot in Libya. Mature did not appear in The Man Inside. Mature made another movie for Romina and Batjac, a Western, Escort West (1959). It was released by UA. UA also distributed Timbuktu (1959), a French Foreign Legion adventure tale that Mature made for producer Edward Small and director Jacques Tourneur.

Mature was reunited with producer Irwin Allen for The Big Circus, shot in early 1959. He then made his second film for Warwick under his two-picture contract with them, The Bandit of Zhobe (1949). Mature was developing a project called Cain and Able around this time, but it was never made. In 1959, Allen said "You think I employ Victor Mature because I like that big lug? I employ him because he brings in the money and he isn't a genius boy." Mature followed this with an Italian peplum, a "sword-and-sandal" movie, Hannibal (1959 ), playing the title role. It was shot in Italy and distributed by Warner Brothers. The Tartars (1961), a Lux Film production with Orson Welles, was filmed in Italy and Yugoslavia.

After finishing The Tartars, Mature announced his retirement from acting. In a 1978 interview, Mature said of his decision to retire from acting at age 46: "It wasn't fun anymore. I was OK financially so I thought what the hell – I'll become a professional loafer."

== Retirement ==
After five years of retirement, Mature was lured back into acting by the opportunity to parody himself in the UA comedy After the Fox (1966), co-written by Neil Simon. Mature played "Tony Powell," an aging actor living off his reputation. In a similar vein in 1968, he played a giant, "The Big Victor", in Head (1968). a Columbia Pictures comedy starring the band The Monkees.

Mature was famously self-deprecatory about his acting skills. Once, after being rejected for membership in a country club because he was an actor, he cracked, "I'm not an actor — and I've got 64 films to prove it!" He was quoted in 1968 on his acting career: "Actually, I am a golfer. That is my real occupation. I never was an actor. Ask anybody, particularly the critics."

Mature came out of retirement again in 1971 to star in the MGM comedy, Every Little Crook and Nanny (1972). Then in 1976, along with other former film stars, he appeared in the Paramount comedy Won Ton Ton, the Dog Who Saved Hollywood (1976). Mature's last feature film role was a cameo as a millionaire in the thriller Firepower in 1979. His final acting role was that of Samson's father "Manoah" in the ABC TV movie Samson and Delilah in 1984. In a 1971 interview, Mature quipped about his decision then to retire:

I was never that crazy about acting. I had a compulsion to earn money, not to act. So, I worked as an actor until I could afford to retire. I wanted to quit while I could still enjoy life ... I like to loaf. Everyone told me I would go crazy or die if I quit working. Yeah? Well, what a lovely way to die.

In 1980, Mature said he was,

"...pretty proud of about 50% of my motion pictures. Demetrius and the Gladiators wasn't bad. The Robe and Samson and Delilah weren't bad. I made 72 of them and I made close to $18 million. So what the hell."

He said in the same interview his favorite actors were Al Pacino, Dustin Hoffman, and especially Burt Reynolds.

== Personal life ==
Mature was married five times.

- Frances Charles (1938–1940, annulled)
- Martha Stephenson Kemp, the widow of bandleader Hal Kemp, (1941–1943, divorced)
- Dorothy Stanford Berry (1948–1955, divorced)
- Adrienne Joy Urwick (1959–1969, divorced)
- Loretta Gaye Sebena, an opera singer (1974 until his death)

Mature was also engaged to Rita Hayworth, before she married Orson Welles, and to the actress Anne Shirley. Mature had only one child, a daughter Victoria with Sebena. Born in 1975, Victoria became an opera singer like her mother. In 2024, Victoria sang at the Edinburgh Fringe Festival. In between songs, she shared memories of her father.

== Death ==
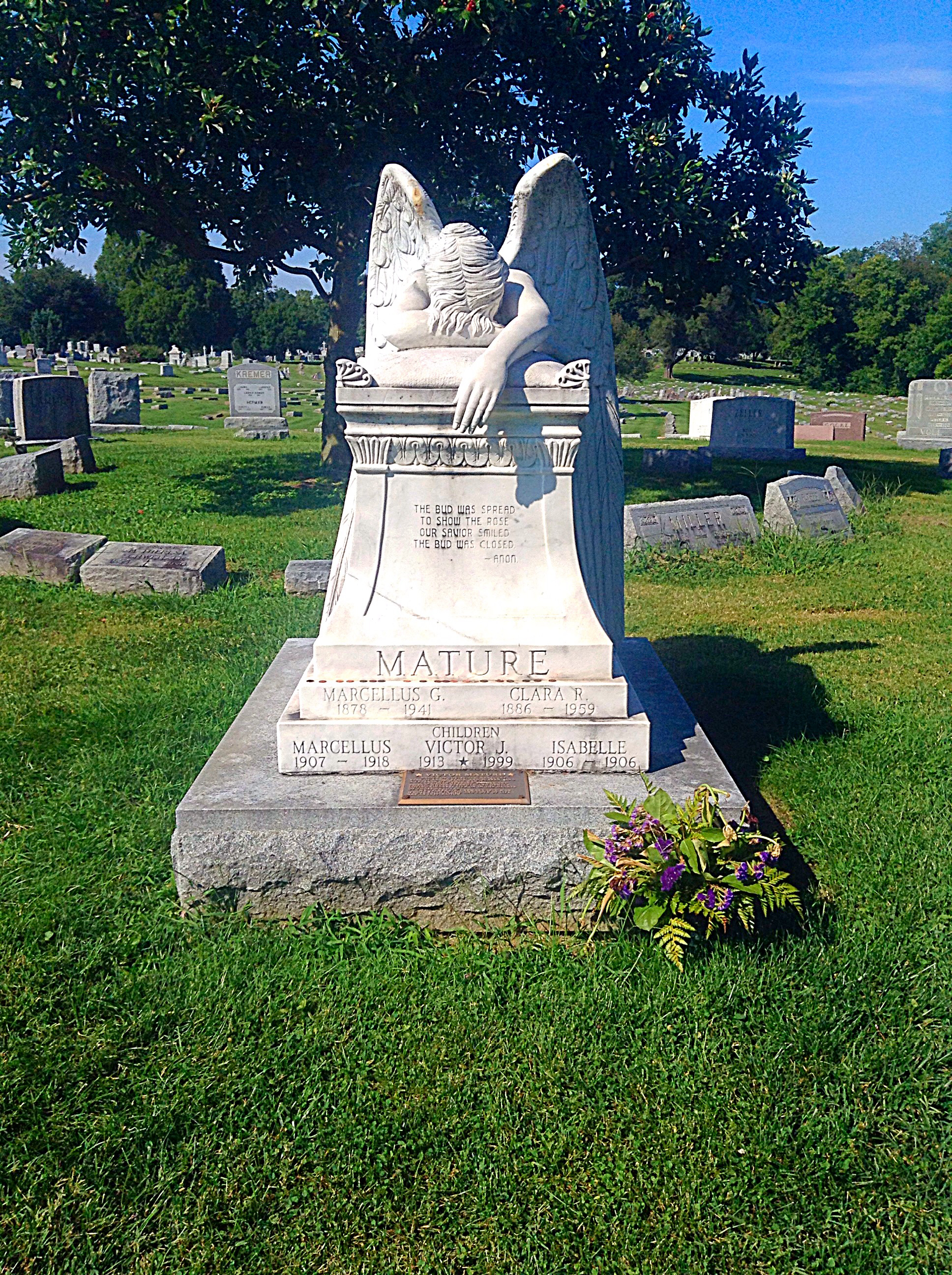
The Mature family's grave at St. Michael's Cemetery, Louisville, Kentucky

Mature died of leukemia in 1999 at his Rancho Santa Fe, California home at age 86. He was buried in the family plot, marked by a replica of the Angel of Grief, at St. Michael's Cemetery in Louisville.

Mature has a star on the Hollywood Walk of Fame in Hollywood, California, located at 6780 Hollywood Boulevard.

== Critical appraisal ==
David Thomson wrote a critical appraisal of Mature in his book The New Biographical Dictionary of Film:

Mature is an uninhibited creature of the naive. Simple, crude, and heady – like ketchup or treacle – he is a diet scorned by the knowing, but obsessive if succumbed to in error. It is too easy to dismiss Mature, for he surpasses badness. He is a strong man in a land of hundred pound weaklings, an incredible concoction of beef steak, husky voice, and brilliantine – a barely concealed sexual advertisement for soiled goods. Remarkably, he is as much himself in the cheerfully meretricious and the pretentiously serious. Such a career has no more pattern than a large ham; it slices consistently forever. The more lurid or distasteful the art the better Mature comes across.

== Filmography ==
Feature films
Year	Title	Role	Company	Notes
1939	The Housekeeper's Daughter	Lefty	Hal Roach Studios	Film debut
1940	One Million B.C.	Tumak	Hal Roach	Alternative title: Cave Man
1940	Captain Caution	Dan Marvin	Hal Roach	
1940	No, No, Nanette	William Trainor	RKO Studios	First screen musical
1941	I Wake Up Screaming	Frankie Christopher (Botticelli)	20th Century Fox	First film noir; Alternative title: Hot Spot
1941	The Shanghai Gesture	Doctor Omar	United Artists	
1942	Song of the Islands	Jeff Harper	Fox	
1942	My Gal Sal	Paul Dresser	Fox	
1942	Footlight Serenade	Tommy Lundy	Fox	
1942	Seven Days' Leave	Johnny Grey	RKO	
1943	Show Business at War	Himself		Short subject about film industry contribution to war effort
1946	My Darling Clementine	Doc Holliday	Fox	First western; directed by John Ford
1947	Moss Rose	Michael Drego	Fox	
1947	Kiss of Death	Nick Bianco	Fox	
1948	Fury at Furnace Creek	Cash Blackwell / Tex Cameron	Fox	Western
1948	Cry of the City	Lt. Candella	Fox	
1949	Easy Living	Pete Wilson	RKO	
1949	Red, Hot and Blue	Danny James	Paramount	
1949	Samson and Delilah	Samson	Paramount	
1950	Wabash Avenue	Andy Clark	Fox	
1950	Stella	Jeff DeMarco	Fox	
1951	Gambling House	Marc Fury	RKO	
1952	The Las Vegas Story	Lt. Dave Andrews	RKO	
1952	Something for the Birds	Steve Bennett	Fox	
1952	Million Dollar Mermaid	James Sullivan	MGM	First movie for MGM
1952	Androcles and the Lion	Captain	RKO	
1953	The Glory Brigade	Lt. Sam Pryor	Fox	
1953	Affair with a Stranger	Bill Blakeley	RKO	
1953	The Robe	Demetrius	Fox	First movie in CinemaScope
1954	The Veils of Bagdad	Antar	Universal	
1954	Dangerous Mission	Matt Hallett	RKO	Alternative title: Rangers of the North
1954	Demetrius and the Gladiators	Demetrius	Fox	Sequel to The Robe
1954	The Egyptian	Horemheb	Fox	
1954	Betrayed	"The Scarf"	MGM	
1955	Chief Crazy Horse	Chief Crazy Horse	Universal	
1955	Violent Saturday	Shelley Martin	Fox	
1955	The Last Frontier	Jed Cooper	Columbia Pictures	
1956	Safari	Ken Duffield	Warwick Films	
1956	The Sharkfighters	Lt. Commander Ben Staves	United Artists	
1956	Zarak	Zarak Khan	Warwick	First film for Warwick Films
1957	Interpol	Charles Sturgis	Warwick	Alternative title: Pickup Alley
1957	The Long Haul	Harry Miller		
1958	No Time to Die	Sgt. David H. Thatcher	Warwick	Alternative title: Tank Force
1958	China Doll	Captain Cliff Brandon	Made for Romina Productions, Mature's own company	
1958	Escort West	Ben Lassiter	Romina	
1959	The Bandit of Zhobe	Kasim Khan		Last movie for Warwick Films
1959	The Big Circus	Henry Jasper "Hank" Whirling	Allied Artists	
1959	Timbuktu	Mike Conway	UA	
1959	Hannibal	Hannibal		Alternative title: Annibale
1962	The Tartars	Oleg	MGM	
1966	After the Fox	Tony Powell		
1968	Head	The Big Victor	Columbia Pictures	
1972	Every Little Crook and Nanny	Carmine Ganucci	MGM	
1976	Won Ton Ton, the Dog Who Saved Hollywood	Nick	Paramount	cameo
1979	Firepower	Harold Everett		cameo at film's conclusion

Television
Year	Title	Role	Notes
1977	M*A*S*H	Dr. John "Doc" Holliday	TV series, episode: "Movie Tonight" in movie footage from My Darling Clementine; Uncredited
1984	Samson and Delilah	Manoah	TV movie, final film role

== Theatre credits ==
- Back to Methuselah by George Bernard Shaw – Pasadena Playhouse, August 1938
- Autumn Crocus – Pasadena Playhouse September–October 1938
- Paradise Plantation – Pasadena Playhouse November 1938
- To Quito and Back by Ben Hecht – Pasadena Playhouse April 1939
- Lady in the Dark – Alvin Theatre, January–June 1941

== Radio appearances ==
Year	Program	Episode/source
1946	Lux Radio Theatre	Coney Island
1949	Escape	The Fortune Of Vargas
1953	Suspense	Joaquin Murietta, California Outlaw

== References in popular culture ==
In 1985, the band R.E.M. performed at the Uptown Lounge in Athens, Georgia, under the pseudonym "Hornets Attack Victor Mature". According to bass player Peter Buck. "We sent a press release that said it the band was a combination of Jerry Lee Lewis and Joy Division. God knows how we got a date, but we did."

Buck had seen the name in a 'Name Your Band' article in Trouser Press. The article described a Los Angeles band called "Hornets Attack Victor Mature". The band was inspired by a newspaper headline about wasps attacking Mature on a golf course. That band later changed names, so Buck considered "Hornets Attack Victor Mature" to be available for his use. "I figured anyone who'd pay money to see a band with a name that silly is our kind of person."

== See also ==
- List of people from the Louisville metropolitan area
