= Magnificent Obsession (1935 film) =

1935 film by John M. Stahl

- Theatrical release poster
- Directed by: John M. Stahl
- Screenplay by: Sarah Y. Mason; Victor Heerman; George O'Neil
- Based on: Magnificent Obsession by Lloyd C. Douglas
- Produced by: John M. Stahl
- Starring: Irene Dunne; Robert Taylor; Charles Butterworth
- Cinematography: John J. Mescall
- Edited by: Milton Carruth
- Music by: Franz Waxman
- Distributed by: Universal Pictures
- Release date: December 30, 1935
- Running time: 112 minutes
- Country: United States
- Language: English
- Budget: $948,697

Magnificent Obsession is a 1935 American melodrama film directed by John M. Stahl from a screenplay by Sarah Y. Mason, Victor Heerman, and George O'Neil, based on the 1929 novel by Lloyd C. Douglas. The film stars Irene Dunne, Robert Taylor, Charles Butterworth, and Betty Furness.

== Plot ==
The life of spoiled Robert Merrick is saved through the use of a hospital's only pulmotor, but because the medical device cannot be in two places at once, it results in the death of Dr. Hudson, a selfless, brilliant surgeon and generous philanthropist. Merrick falls in love with Hudson's widow, Helen, though she holds him responsible for her husband's demise. One day, he insists on driving her home, and makes a pass at her. She gets out, and is struck by another car, losing her sight. Merrick confronts a friend of Helen's husband, wanting to know why a beautiful young woman would marry a middle-aged man. The doctor's friend tells him that her husband had a philosophy - to help people, but never let it be known that you are the one helping them. Only then, he believed, could there be true reward in life.

Merrick watches over Helen, and visits her during her recuperation, concealing his identity and calling himself Dr. Robert. His true identity is known to Helen's step-daughter, Joyce, who keeps it a secret. When he finds out that she is nearly penniless, Merrick secretly pays for specialists to try to restore her vision. Finally, she travels to Paris, and is told that her eyesight is gone forever. Robert follows her, confesses his true identity, and proposes marriage. She forgives him and reciprocates his love, but then leaves him secretly the next morning, not wanting to be a burden to him.

Six years later, Robert has become a Nobel Prize-winning brain surgeon. He learns that Helen urgently needs an operation, which he performs. When she awakens, she can already see some light. Robert tells her that in a short while her sight will return completely.

== Cast ==
- Irene Dunne as Helen Hudson
- Robert Taylor as Robert Merrick
- Charles Butterworth as Tommy Masterson
- Betty Furness as Joyce Hudson
- Sara Haden as Mrs. Nancy Ashford
- Ralph Morgan as Randolph
- Henry Armetta as Tony
- Gilbert Emery as Doctor Ramsay
- Arthur Treacher as Horace
- Beryl Mercer as Mrs. Eden
- Alyce Ardell as The French Maid
- Theodore von Eltz as Dr. Preston
- Sidney Bracey as Butler
- Arthur Hoyt as Perry
- Cora Sue Collins as Ruth
- Frank Mayo as John Stone (uncredited)

== Production notes ==
The film, which raised Robert Taylor to stardom, had its New York City premiere at Radio City Music Hall on December 30, 1935, and drew capacity crowds, despite frigid weather.

== Remake ==
The film was remade in 1954 by director Douglas Sirk, with Rock Hudson and Jane Wyman in the leads.

== Adaptations in other media ==
Magnificent Obsession was adapted as a radio play on the April 26, 1937, and November 13, 1944, broadcasts of Lux Radio Theater, the first starring Robert Taylor and Irene Dunne in their original film roles, the second with Claudette Colbert and Don Ameche. It was also adapted on the January 19, 1941, broadcast of The Screen Guild Theater, starring Myrna Loy and Don Ameche, and the February 13, 1949, broadcast of Screen Director's Playhouse, with Irene Dunne and Willard Waterman.

== Home media ==
A newly restored version of the 1935 film is included in the Criterion Collection double-disc package titled Magnificent Obsession, released in January 2009. Available in either Blu-ray or DVD, the package includes a digital restoration of the 1954 adaptation and extras relating to Douglas Sirk's version.
