= The Big Fisherman =

1959 film

- Film poster by Reynold Brown
- Directed by: Frank Borzage
- Screenplay by: Howard Estabrook and Rowland V. Lee
- Based on: the novel by Lloyd C. Douglas
- Produced by: Rowland V. Lee
- Starring: Howard Keel; Susan Kohner; John Saxon; Martha Hyer; Herbert Lom
- Cinematography: Lee Garmes
- Edited by: Paul Weatherwax
- Music by: Albert Hay Malotte
- Production companies: Centurion Films, Inc. Rowland V. Lee Production
- Distributed by: Buena Vista Film Distribution Company
- Release date: August 4, 1959 (US)
- Running time: 166 minutes
- Country: United States
- Language: English
- Budget: $4 million
- Box office: $3 million (US/Canada rentals)

The Big Fisherman is a 1959 American historical drama film directed by Frank Borzage about the life of Simon Peter, one of the disciples of Jesus. Starring Howard Keel, Susan Kohner and John Saxon, the production is adapted from the 1948 novel of the same name by Lloyd C. Douglas. The film was shot at Universal-International studios but released by Buena Vista, the film releasing company of Walt Disney Productions.

The Robe ends with "the Big Fisherman" as a nickname for Peter; Jesus called him "the fisher of men" and "the Rock".

== Plot ==
The story traces Peter's journey from self-sufficient fisherman to his dependency on a risen Christ. It also presents another story of redemption and forgiveness, as he takes in a young Arab/Jewish girl, Fara. As they both learn of Jesus, it changes their lives.

The young Fara discovers that she is the daughter of Herod Antipas who married and shortly discarded her Arab mother Arnon in favor of Herodias. Disguised as a boy, Fara goes to Galilee to assassinate Antipas in revenge.

Robbed by bandits, Fara is discovered by John the Baptist who advises her to listen to the great teacher, Jesus. She comes under the protection of Peter but persists in her vows to kill Antipas. She manages to be employed in Antipas' household to translate a series of prophecies.

Fara and Peter hear Jesus teaching. Fara turns away when he urges nonviolence. Peter is initially cynical, but in stages is drawn to become his disciple.

Fara gains an opportunity to kill Antipas, and reveals her identity to him. As Peter watches, Antipas urges her not to sink to murder. Fara recalls the words of Christ, and lowers her knife. Peter declares her free of her own chains.

Peter takes Fara to Arabia where they rescue Voldi, an Arab prince who wishes to marry her. However, Fara realises that her mixed race would jeopardize his future rule, so she leaves with Peter to spread the word of peace.

== Cast ==
- Howard Keel as Simon-Peter
- Susan Kohner as Fara
- John Saxon as Voldi
- Martha Hyer as Herodias
- Herbert Lom as Herod Antipas
- Ray Stricklyn as Deran
- Marian Seldes as Arnon
- Alexander Scourby as David Ben-Zadok
- Beulah Bondi as Hannah
- Jay Barney as John the Baptist
- Charlotte Fletcher as Rennah
- Mark Dana as Zendi
- Rhodes Reason as Andrew
- Henry Brandon as Mencius
- Brian Hutton as John
- Thomas Troupe as James
- Marianne Stewart as Ione
- Jonathan Harris as Lysias
- Leonard Mudie as Ilderan
- James Griffith as The beggar
- Peter Adams as Phillip (Herod Philip)
- Jo Gilbert as Deborah
- Michael Mark as Innkeeper
- Joe Di Reda as Assassin
- Stuart Randall as Aretas
- Herbert Rudley as Tiberius
- Phillip Pine as Lucius
- Francis McDonald as Scribe spokesman
- Perry Ivins as Pharisee spokesman
- Ralph Moody as Aged Pharisee
- Jony Jochim as Sadducee spokesman
- Don Turner as Roman captain

== Production ==
The film was Rowland V. Lee's first in over 10 years. It was shot in Super Panavision 70 (the first film so credited) by Lee Garmes. The original music score was composed by Albert Hay Malotte, an American composer who is best known for his musical setting of The Lord's Prayer, composed in 1935, and introduced on radio that year by John Charles Thomas.

Though originally rejected by Walt Disney because of its religious tone, the film was supported by Roy Disney, and was distributed by Buena Vista, making it one of the few religious films ever associated with the Disney Company.

It was shot on location in the San Fernando Valley in California. Portions were shot at La Quinta, California.

After having starred in a number of MGM film musicals from 1950 (Annie Get Your Gun) to 1955 (Kismet), Howard Keel switched to straight acting roles with the 1958 British noir thriller Floods of Fear, followed by The Big Fisherman. He starred or co-starred in six additional features (four of which were westerns) between 1961 and 1968 and made his final appearance in a 2002 film, playing a supporting role.

John Saxon was borrowed from Universal. It was the last film that Borzage completed.

== Reception ==
Variety called it "pious but plodding."

Leonard Maltin's Movie Guide (2012 edition) gave The Big Fisherman 2½ stars out of 4, describing it as a "sprawling religious epic" and deciding that it is "seldom dull, but not terribly inspiring." Steven H. Scheuer's Movies on TV and Videocassette (1993–1994 edition) also settled on 2½ stars out of 4, writing that "the story of Simon called Peter" "unfolds with predictable pageantry and uplifting sermonizing".

Assigning 2 stars (out of 5), The Motion Picture Guide (1987 edition) found it to be "long, often-enraging and totally miscast" with "a nonsinging Keel as Saint Peter". Evaluating the presentation as "just so much biblical nonsense because such liberties are taken that any serious student of the life and surrounding events will take exception," the write-up declares that "Douglas wrote the novel but made the mistake of entrusting it to the wrong people." After pointing out the film's "numerous technical mistakes: microphone boom shadows, klieg lights, Martha Hyer's vaccination mark", the Guide concludes that "to make a love story the focal point of such a potentially dynamic saga of history's most memorable era was a bad decision. One of the rare bummers by Disney in those years."

Leslie Halliwell in his Film and Video Guide (5th edition, 1985) dismissed it as a "well-meaning but leaden adaptation of a bestselling novel which followed on from The Robe. He concluded that it is "too reverent by half, and in many respects surprisingly incompetent." Halliwell's quoted Monthly Film Bulletin ("its overall flatness of conception and execution is a stiff price to pay for the lack of spectacular sensationalism characterizing its fellow-epics") and The Hollywood Reporter ("the picture is three hours long, and, except for those who can be dazzled by big gatherings of props, horses and camels, it is hard to find three minutes of entertainment in it").

== Running time ==
Leonard Maltin's Movie Guide (2012 edition) notes that the film's running time was originally 184 minutes, then cut to 164 minutes then to 149 minutes.

== Awards and honors ==
The film was nominated for three Academy Awards:

- Lee Garmes for Best Cinematography
- Renié for Best Costume Design
- John DeCuir and Julia Heron for Best Art Direction (color)
