= The Robe =

1942 novel by Lloyd C. Douglas

- First edition
- Author: Lloyd C. Douglas
- Language: English
- Genre: Christian novel
- Publisher: Houghton Mifflin
- Publication date: 1942
- Publication place: United States
- Media type: Print (Hardcover, Paperback)
- Pages: 556
- Followed by: The Big Fisherman

The Robe is a 1942 historical novel about the Crucifixion of Jesus, written by Lloyd C. Douglas. The book was one of the best-selling titles of the 1940s. It entered the New York Times Best Seller list in October 1942, four weeks later rose to No. 1, and held the position for nearly a year. The Robe remained on the list for another two years, returning several other times over the next several years including when the film adaptation (featuring Richard Burton in an early role) was released in 1953.

== Inspiration ==
Lloyd C. Douglas began his literary career after leaving the ministry at the age of 52. All of his novels, essays, and short stories relied on his spiritual background for thematic and creative inspiration. At the height of his popularity, Douglas was receiving on average 100 letters a week from fans.

One of these letters provided the inspiration for The Robe. Hazel McCann, a department store clerk from Ohio, wrote to Douglas asking what he thought had happened to Christ's garments after the crucifixion. Douglas immediately began working on a novel based on this concept, sending each chapter to McCann as he finished it. Douglas and McCann finally met in 1941, and it is to her that Douglas has dedicated the book.

== Plot ==
The book explores the aftermath of the crucifixion of Jesus through the experiences of the Roman tribune Marcellus Gallio and his Greek slave Demetrius. Prince Gaius, in an effort to rid Rome of Marcellus, banishes Marcellus to the command of the Roman garrison at Minoa, a port city in southern Palestine. In Jerusalem during Passover, Marcellus ends up carrying out the crucifixion of Jesus but is troubled since he believes Jesus is innocent of any crime.

Marcellus and some other soldiers throw dice to see who will take Jesus' seamless robe. Marcellus wins and asks Demetrius to take care of the robe.

Following the crucifixion, Marcellus takes part in a banquet attended by Pontius Pilate. During the banquet, a drunken centurion insists that Marcellus wear Jesus' robe. Reluctantly wearing the garment, Marcellus apparently suffers a nervous breakdown and returns to Rome.

Sent to Athens to recuperate, Marcellus finally gives in to Demetrius' urging and touches the robe, and his mind is subsequently restored. Marcellus, now believing the robe has some sort of innate power, returns to Judea, follows the path Jesus took, and meets many people whose lives Jesus had affected. Based upon their experiences, first Demetrius and then Marcellus become followers of Jesus.

Marcellus then returns to Rome, where he must report his experiences to the emperor Tiberius at Villa Jovis on Capri. Marcellus frees Demetrius, who escapes. However, later on, because of his uncompromising stance regarding his Christian faith, both Marcellus and his new wife Diana are executed by the new emperor, Caligula. Marcellus arranges that the robe be given to "The Big Fisherman" (Simon Peter).

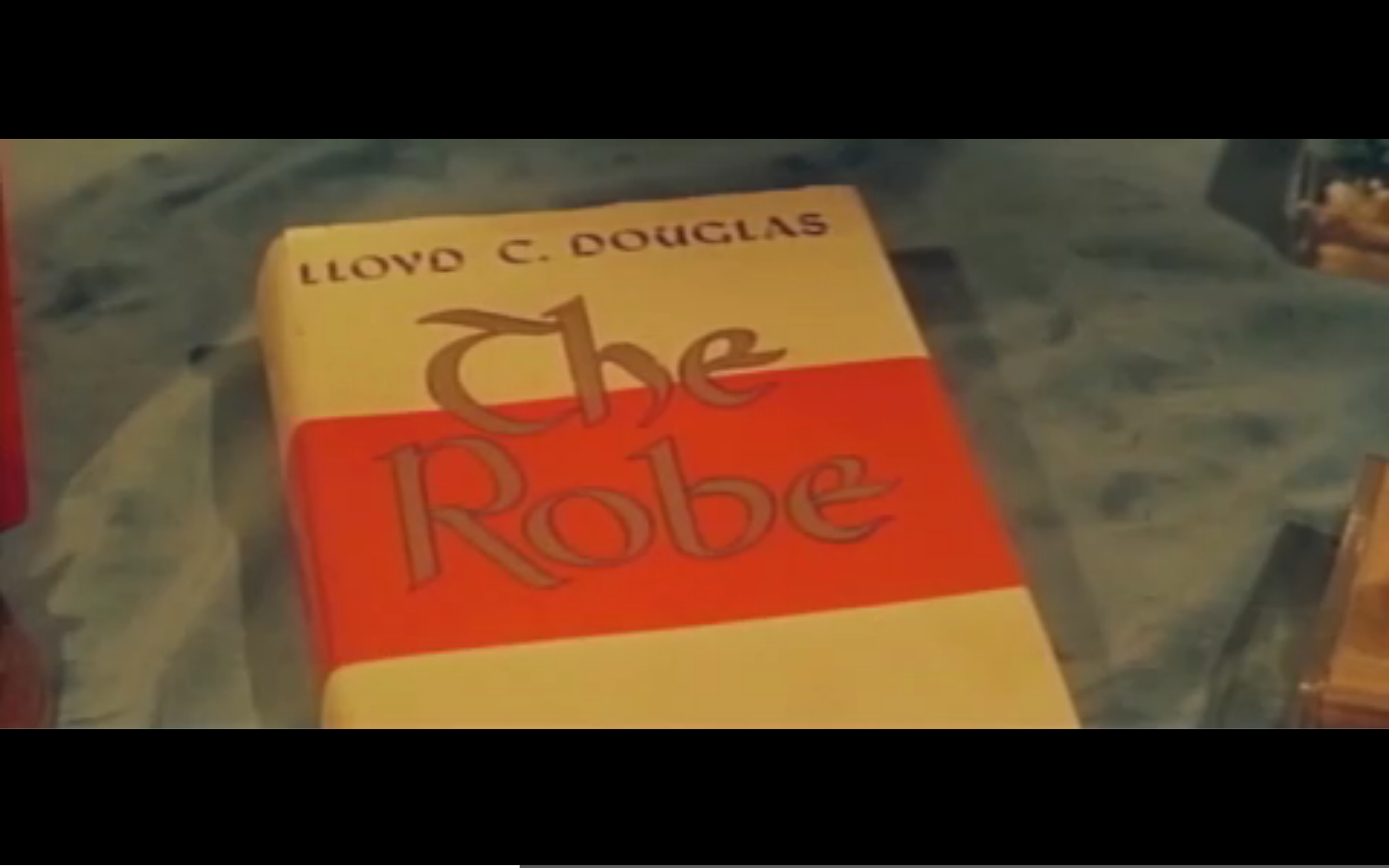
The Robe trailer screenshot

== Adaptations ==
- The Robe (1953), film directed by Henry Koster
- Demetrius and the Gladiators (1954), a sequel, directed by Delmer Daves
