= The Big Fisherman (book) =

1948 historical novel by Lloyd C. Douglas

- Cover of first edition
- Author: Lloyd C. Douglas
- Language: English
- Genre: Christian novel
- Publisher: Houghton Mifflin
- Publication date: 1948
- Publication place: United States
- Media type: Print (Hardcover, Paperback)
- Pages: 581

The Big Fisherman is a 1948 historical novel written by Lloyd C. Douglas. The book was the best-selling novel of 1948. It ranked No. 1 on the New York Times Best Seller list for 16 consecutive weeks from December 19, 1948, through April 3, 1949.

== Plot ==
The novel presents a fictionalized account of the life of Fara, the daughter of an Arabian princess and Herod Antipas, the ruler of Galilee. Fara vows to kill Herod as revenge for his discarding Fara's mother. Fara goes to Galilee where she meets John the Baptist and Simon Peter.

Simon Peter becomes a disciple of Jesus. Simon Peter shares the teachings of Jesus with Fara. Fara secures work in Herod's household but decides in the end not to kill him. Simon Peter and Fara travel to Arabia where they rescue Voldi, a prince who wishes to marry Fara. Fara decides not to marry Voldi and instead leaves with Simon Peter to spread the teachings of Jesus.

== Reception ==
LeBaron R. Barker in The Boston Globe wrote: "The magic of the old, old story is here and the magic of Douglas as well, for it is his warm and simple style that brings freshness and new vigor to it. If this is the last of Douglas' novels, and I for one hope it is not, it is a fine book on which to end a great writing career."

== Film adaptation ==
The book was adapted into the 1959 film The Big Fisherman, directed by Frank Borzage. The film was nominated for three Academy Awards.
