= Fay Bainter =

American actress (1893–1968)

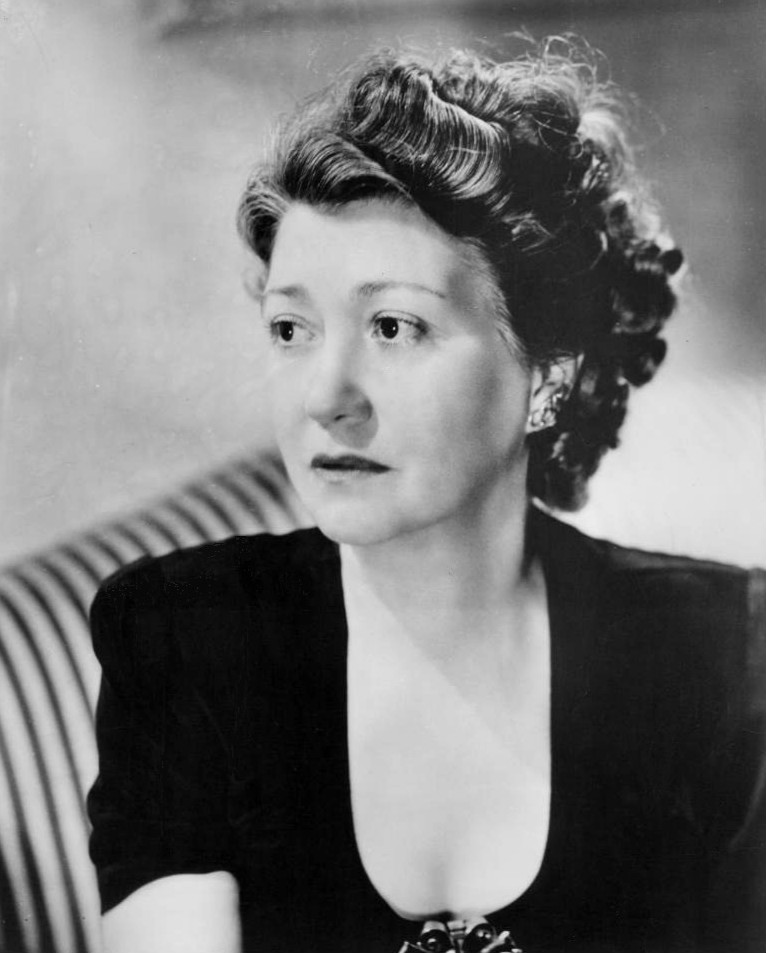
- Bainter in 1950
- Born: Fay Okell Bainter; December 7, 1893; Los Angeles, California, U.S.
- Died: April 16, 1968 (aged 74); Los Angeles, California, U.S.
- Resting place: Arlington National Cemetery
- Occupation: Actress
- Years active: 1907–1961
- Known for: Jezebel; White Banners; State Fair; The Children's Hour
- Spouse: Reginald Venable (m. 1921; died 1964)
- Children: 1

Fay Okell Bainter (December 7, 1893 – April 16, 1968) was an American film and stage actress. She won the Academy Award for Best Supporting Actress for Jezebel (1938) and has a star on the Hollywood Walk of Fame. Other notable films include Make Way for Tomorrow (1937), Woman of the Year (1942), State Fair (1945), and The Children's Hour (1960)

== Early life ==
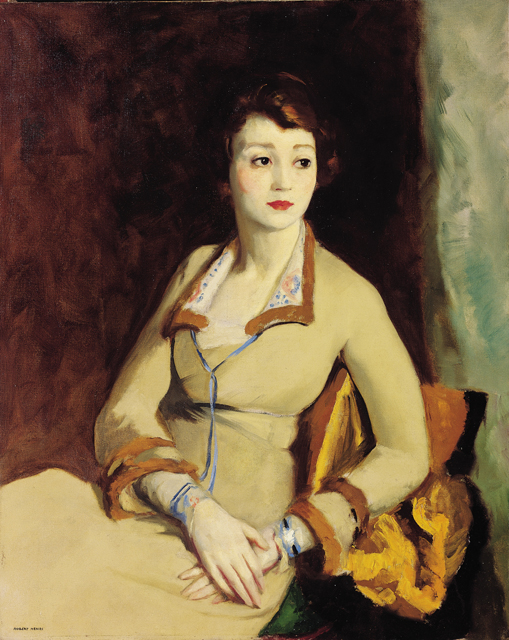
Portrait of Fay Bainter by Robert Henri (1918)

Bainter was born in Los Angeles, California, the daughter of Charles F. Bainter and Mary Okell.

== Career ==
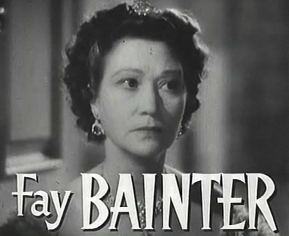
Fay Bainter in Jezebel (1938).

Bainter made her first appearance on stage in 1908 in The County Chairman at Morosco's Burbank Theater, which was at 548-550 South Main Street, in Los Angeles, California. In 1910, she was a traveling stage actress. Her Broadway debut was in the role of Celine Marinter in The Rose of Panama (1912). P. G. Wodehouse, reviewing Turn to the Right in Vanity Fair in 1916, wrote, "Miss Bainter's advent from nowhere and her instant success form the season's biggest sensation." She appeared in a number of successful plays in New York, such as East Is West, The Willow Tree, and Dodsworth. In 1926, she appeared with Walter Abel in a Broadway production of Channing Pollock's The Enemy. MGM persuaded her to try films and her movie debut was in This Side of Heaven (February 1934). Also in 1934, she appeared in Dodsworth on Broadway and in the film It Happened One Day. Bainter quickly achieved success in the movies, and in 1939, she became the first performer to receive two Oscar nominations in the same year, contending for both Best Actress for White Banners (1938) and Best Supporting Actress for Jezebel (1938), winning for the latter. In 1940, she played Mrs. Gibbs in the film production of the Thornton Wilder play Our Town. In 1945, she played Melissa Frake in the Rodgers and Hammerstein musical State Fair. She was again nominated for Best Supporting Actress for her role in The Children's Hour (1961).

Bainter has a star on the Hollywood Walk of Fame at 7021 Hollywood Boulevard in Los Angeles, California.

== Personal life ==
Fay Bainter and Reginald Venable were married on June 8, 1921, in Riverside, California. Cmdr. Reginald Venable was a United States Navy officer who graduated from the US Naval Academy in 1913. He resigned from the Navy in 1925 as a lieutenant commander to manage his wife's business affairs. He had been a real-estate operator. The couple had one son, Reginald Venable Jr., who became an actor.

Bainter was the aunt of actress Dorothy Burgess.

Bainter and Venable are interred at Arlington National Cemetery.

== Filmography ==
Films
Year	Title	Role	Notes
1934	This Side of Heaven	Francene Turner	
1937	Quality Street	Susan Throssel	
1937	The Soldier and the Lady	Strogoff's Mother	
1937	Make Way for Tomorrow	Anita Cooper	
1938	White Banners	Hannah Parmalee	Nominated – Academy Award for Best Actress
1938	Jezebel	Aunt Belle Massey	Academy Award for Best Supporting Actress
1938	Mother Carey's Chickens	Mrs. Margaret Carey	
1938	The Arkansas Traveler	Mrs. Martha Allen	
1938	The Shining Hour	Hannah Linden	
1939	Yes, My Darling Daughter	Ann "Annie" Murray	
1939	The Lady and the Mob	Hattie Leonard	
1939	Daughters Courageous	Nancy "Nan" Masters	
1939	Our Neighbors – The Carters	Ellen Carter	
1940	Young Tom Edison	Mrs. Samuel (Nancy) Edison	
1940	Our Town	Mrs. Julia Hersey Gibbs	
1940	A Bill of Divorcement	Margaret "Meg" Fairfield	
1940	Maryland	Charlotte Danfield	
1941	Babes on Broadway	Miss "Jonesy" Jones	
1942	Woman of the Year	Ellen Whitcomb	
1942	The War Against Mrs. Hadley	Stella Hadley	
1942	Journey for Margaret	Trudy Strauss	
1942	Mrs. Wiggs of the Cabbage Patch	Mrs. Elvira Wiggs	
1943	The Human Comedy	Mrs. Macauley	
1943	Presenting Lily Mars	Mrs. Thornway	
1943	Salute to the Marines	Jennie Bailey	
1943	Cry 'Havoc'	Captain Alice Marsh	
1944	The Heavenly Body	Margaret Sibyll	
1944	Dark Waters	Aunt Emily	
1944	Three Is a Family	Frances Whittaker	
1945	State Fair	Melissa Frake	
1946	The Kid from Brooklyn	Mrs. E. Winthrop LeMoyne	
1946	The Virginian	Mrs. Taylor	
1947	Deep Valley	Ellie Saul	
1947	The Secret Life of Walter Mitty	Mrs. Eunice Mitty	
1948	Give My Regards to Broadway	Fay Norwick	
1948	June Bride	Paula Winthrop	
1951	Close to My Heart	Mrs. Morrow	
1953	The President's Lady	Mrs. Donaldson	
1961	The Children's Hour	Mrs. Amelia Tilford	Laurel Award for Top Female Supporting Performance (2nd place); Nominated – Academy Award for Best Supporting Actress; Nominated – Golden Globe Award for Best Supporting Actress – Motion Picture

== Radio appearances ==
Year	Program	Episode/source
1946	Suspense	180/"The Lucky Lady"
1952	Theatre Guild on the Air	"The Search"

== See also ==
- List of actors with Academy Award nominations
- List of actors with Hollywood Walk of Fame motion picture stars
