= Demetrius and the Gladiators =

1954 film by Delmer Daves

- Original film poster
- Directed by: Delmer Daves
- Written by: Philip Dunne
- Based on: Characters from The Robe by Lloyd C. Douglas
- Produced by: Frank Ross
- Starring: Victor Mature; Susan Hayward; Michael Rennie; Debra Paget; Anne Bancroft; Jay Robinson; Barry Jones; William Marshall; Richard Egan; Ernest Borgnine; Charles Evans
- Cinematography: Milton R. Krasner
- Edited by: Robert Fritch; Dorothy Spencer
- Music by: Franz Waxman
- Production company: 20th Century-Fox
- Distributed by: 20th Century-Fox
- Release date: June 16, 1954 (Los Angeles)
- Running time: 101 minutes
- Country: United States
- Language: English
- Budget: $1.99 million
- Box office: $26 million

Demetrius and the Gladiators is a 1954 American Technicolor/CinemaScope epic biblical drama film directed by Delmer Daves and produced by Frank Ross for 20th Century Fox. A sequel to The Robe (1953), the screenplay was written by Philip Dunne, based on characters created by Lloyd C. Douglas in The Robe.

Victor Mature stars as Demetrius, a Christian slave made to fight in the Roman arena as a gladiator, and Susan Hayward as Messalina, a reprobate who is married to Claudius, the uncle of the depraved emperor Caligula. The cast also features Ernest Borgnine, William Marshall, Michael Rennie, Jay Robinson as Caligula, Debra Paget, Anne Bancroft in one of her earlier roles, and Julie Newmar as a briefly seen dancing entertainer.

== Plot ==
After his friends Marcellus and Diana are executed for heresy and treason, Demetrius makes it his mission to hide the Robe of Christ. One day, while with his beloved, Lucia, he is arrested for assaulting a Roman centurion and sentenced to the arena. There, Demetrius trains as a gladiator and soon wins acclaim, proving his valor against a pack of hungry tigers. The emperor, Caligula, appoints him bodyguard of Messalina, unfaithful wife of Claudius. He soon tires of waiting on his mistress and returns to the arena. Later, Lucia disguises herself to gain entrance to the gladiator school to see Demetrius. However, the two are forcibly separated on orders from a jealous Messalina. Lucia is then assaulted by Dardanius and four other gladiators. Demetrius prays for God to save her, but it appears Dardanius has broken Lucia's neck. All are shocked at Lucia's sudden demise. Demetrius then renounces his faith in Christ.

Previously, Demetrius had avoided killing human competitors in the arena because of his religion. All that now changes. He ferociously slays all five of the gladiators who assaulted Lucia. The spectators are thrilled by his savagery. Emperor Caligula asks Demetrius to renounce Christ. He does so. Thus, Caligula frees him and inducts him into the Praetorian Guard with the rank of Tribune. Having rejected Christianity, Demetrius begins a lusty affair with Messalina that lasts for months. One day, Caligula holds audience with Demetrius and orders him to retrieve the Robe. Later while carrying out the emperor's command, he is surprised to discover Lucia, lying on a bed, clutching the Robe. It turns out she never died. Demetrius realizes his mistake, prays to God for forgiveness, and Lucia awakens.

Nevertheless, Demetrius takes the Robe to the emperor, as ordered. He is horrified that Caligula has had a prisoner killed so he can use the powers of the Robe to bring him back to life—which he fails to do. As Demetrius steps toward Caligula to attack, he is stopped by the guards. On Caligula's orders, he is returned to the arena. However, Demetrius refuses to take part in the mayhem. So the Emperor orders the Praetorian Guard to execute Demetrius. But the Praetorian Guard (already angry over bad wages and conditions) execute Caligula instead. Afterward, Claudius is installed as Caligula's successor. In his first formal address as Rome's leader, Claudius decrees that Christians will no longer be persecuted by the state. The Robe is returned to the disciple Peter and his followers.

== Cast ==
- Victor Mature – Demetrius
- Susan Hayward – Messalina
- Michael Rennie – Peter
- Debra Paget – Lucia
- Anne Bancroft – Paula
- Jay Robinson – Caligula
- Barry Jones – Claudius
- William Marshall – Glycon
- Richard Egan – Dardanius
- Ernest Borgnine – Strabo
- Charles Evans – Cassius Chaerea
- Jean Simmons – as Diana (in clip from The Robe)
- Richard Burton – as Marcellus (in clip from The Robe)
- Cameron Mitchell – voice of Jesus in clip from The Robe
- John Cliff – Varus (uncredited)
- Karl Davis – Macro (uncredited)
- Carmen de Lavallade – slave girl
- George Eldredge – chamberlain (uncredited)
- Everett Glass – Kaeso (uncredited)
- Fred Graham – Decurion (uncredited)
- Selmer Jackson – senator (uncredited)
- Roy Jenson – gladiator (uncredited)
- Paul Newlan – potter (uncredited)
- Julie Newmar – primary specialty dancer (uncredited)
- Woody Strode – gladiator (uncredited)
- Jeff York – Albus (uncredited)

== Production ==
The sequel was planned even before The Robe had been released. It was originally known as The Story of Demetrius. Filming was completed by September 1953.

== Reception ==
=== Box office ===
Demetrius and the Gladiators was a massive commercial success. In its initial release, the film earned $4.25 million in US theatrical rentals, against a budget of less than $2 million. Overall, it grossed $26 million in North America, making it one of the highest-grossing films of 1954.

=== Critical response ===
Bosley Crowther of The New York Times wrote that "we've got to hand it to Producer Frank Ross and Philip Dunne, the writer who put this one together out of whole cloth instead of The Robe ... they have millinered this saga along straight Cecil B. Devotional lines, which means stitching on equal cuttings of spectacle, action, sex and reverence".

Variety called the film "a worthy successor" to The Robe, "beautifully fashioned with all the basics of good drama and action that can play, and quite often do, against any setting, period or modern".

Edwin Schallert of the Los Angeles Times wrote: "As long as Mature is merely bluffing at being a gladiator, and trying at the same time to remain true to the principles of Christianity, the drama of the picture limps along ... Once Mature suddenly goes on a rampage as a fighter in the arena, Demetrius takes on new life. It holds onto that animation most creditably even when its central character reforms".

Richard L. Coe of The Washington Post stated: "Because there is less of the religious aspect of its Lloyd C. Douglas predecessor, and much more of the man-versus-lions-versus-men-versus-women-versus-vino of the early Cecil B. DeMille school herein, I suspect that, movie-wise at least, Demetrius and the Gladiators is a more enjoyable, less stuffy entertainment".

Harrison's Reports wrote: "Excellent! As a general rule, it is too much to hope that a sequel to an outstanding picture will be as good as the original, but Demetrius and the Gladiators, which is a CinemaScope sequel to The Robe, is one of the rare exceptions to the rule, for it not only matches the spectacular production quality of the original but also surpasses it in entertainment appeal".

The Monthly Film Bulletin wrote: "This sequel to The Robe seems much less inhibited by religious awe than its predecessor. Its spectacle is more lusty; its vulgarity unabashed. Twice it turns back reverently to The Robe (in flashback) as to a chastening altar, but happily soon regains its own noisy bounce in describing suggestive doings in dirty ancient Rome".

On Rotten Tomatoes, the film holds a rating of 77% from 13 reviews.
