= White Banners =

1938 film by Edmund Goulding

- Lobby card
- Directed by: Edmund Goulding
- Written by: Lenore J. Coffee; Abem Finkel; Cameron Rogers
- Produced by: Henry Blanke; Hal B. Wallis
- Starring: Claude Rains; Fay Bainter; Jackie Cooper; Bonita Granville; Henry O'Neill; Kay Johnson
- Cinematography: Charles Rosher
- Edited by: Thomas Richards
- Music by: Max Steiner
- Production company: Warner Bros. Pictures
- Distributed by: Warner Bros. Pictures
- Release date: June 22, 1938
- Running time: 92 minutes
- Country: United States
- Language: English

White Banners is a 1938 Warner Bros. drama film directed by Edmund Goulding and starring Claude Rains, Fay Bainter, Jackie Cooper, Bonita Granville, Henry O'Neill, and Kay Johnson.

Produced by Henry Blanke and Hal B. Wallis, the screenplay was adapted by Lenore J. Coffee, Abem Finkel and Cameron Rogers from the 1936 novel of the same title by Lloyd C. Douglas.

== Plot ==
On a dreary, cold, and snowy day in a small town in 1919 Indiana, peddler Hannah Parmale appears at the door of a kind couple, Paul Ward and his wife, Marcia, selling apple peelers. Asked by Mrs. Ward to come inside and warm up, Hannah sees that they are struggling financially and are in need of some domestic help. She offers her services and becomes their cook and housekeeper for room and board.

Mr. Ward, a science teacher by day, is an inventor by night attempting to create something that will provide sufficient money for Marcia, their teenaged daughter Sally and their new baby, to have some luxuries in life. Hannah, who is extremely wise and helpful, comes up with some good ideas. She persuades Ward to sell old and useless furniture to raise money and make a place for his work in the basement.

Their teenaged neighbor, Peter Trimble, is one of Ward's students and the son of the richest man in town, Sam Trimble. Hannah is very pleased to know Peter and to be a part of his life. In her devotion to him, however, she is never able to indulge the motherly instinct she feels, except in an indirect way. He is very good at science and, after Hannah suggests that he set a good example for the boy, Ward asks young Trimble to become his assistant. Sally develops a crush on Peter.

Ward's invention, an "iceless icebox," is unintentionally revealed by Peter to local mechanics Joe Ellis and his brother Bill. When the Ellis brothers steal it and have it patented, Peter feels so bad about what he did that he lies when Ward asks him about it. In the meantime, Sally becomes ill with pneumonia.

Hannah persuades Ward that it is best to "turn the other cheek" and to give young Peter another chance. Ward then develops a new and better feature for his invention, which is on its way to becoming an electric home refrigerator. Sally recovers and she and her mother, Marcia, leave on a trip with the baby.

Another crisis arises, however, when wealthy Chicago businessman Thomas Bradford arrives to discuss financing of Ward's invention. Hannah reveals to Ward that Peter Trimble is her son who she was forced to give up all those years ago because he was born out of wedlock. Sam Trimble adopted him after his own baby died, but Bradford is the boy's biological father. When Bradford finds out that Peter is his son, he wants to claim him. Hannah, however, persuades him not to reveal the truth to Peter.

Satisfied with the kind of young man her son has become, and that he is on the right path in life, Hannah, leaves without Peter, who believes that his adoptive parents are his biological parents. She walks off into the wintry landscape.

== Cast ==
- Claude Rains as Paul Ward
- Fay Bainter as Hannah Parmalee
- Jackie Cooper as Peter Trimble
- Bonita Granville as Sally Ward
- Henry O'Neill as Sam Trimble
- Kay Johnson as Mrs. Marcia Ward
- James Stephenson as Thomas Bradford
- J. Farrell MacDonald as Dr. Thompson
- William Pawley as Joe Ellis
- Edward Pawley as Bill Ellis
- John Ridgely as Charles Ellis
- Mary Field as Hester, Trimble's secretary
- Edward McWade as Sloan, the furniture dealer

== Reception ==
The film, Fay Bainter and others of the cast received very good reviews in the Los Angeles Times. Bainter was nominated for the Academy Award for Best Actress in a Leading Role for her performance as Hannah Parmalee.

== In popular culture ==
- White Banners is referenced in the song "Hana," written and performed by Joni Mitchell on her album Shine (2007).

== See also ==
- List of American films of 1938
