= Moonfire =

Moonfire may refer to:

- Moonfire (venture capital firm), an early-stage venture capital firm
- Moonfire (album), a 2011 album by Boy & Bear
- Moonfire (film), a 1970 action adventure film
- Of a Fire on the Moon, a 1970 book by Norman Mailer, later republished as Moonfire
