= Freddie Bartholomew =

American actor (1924–1992)

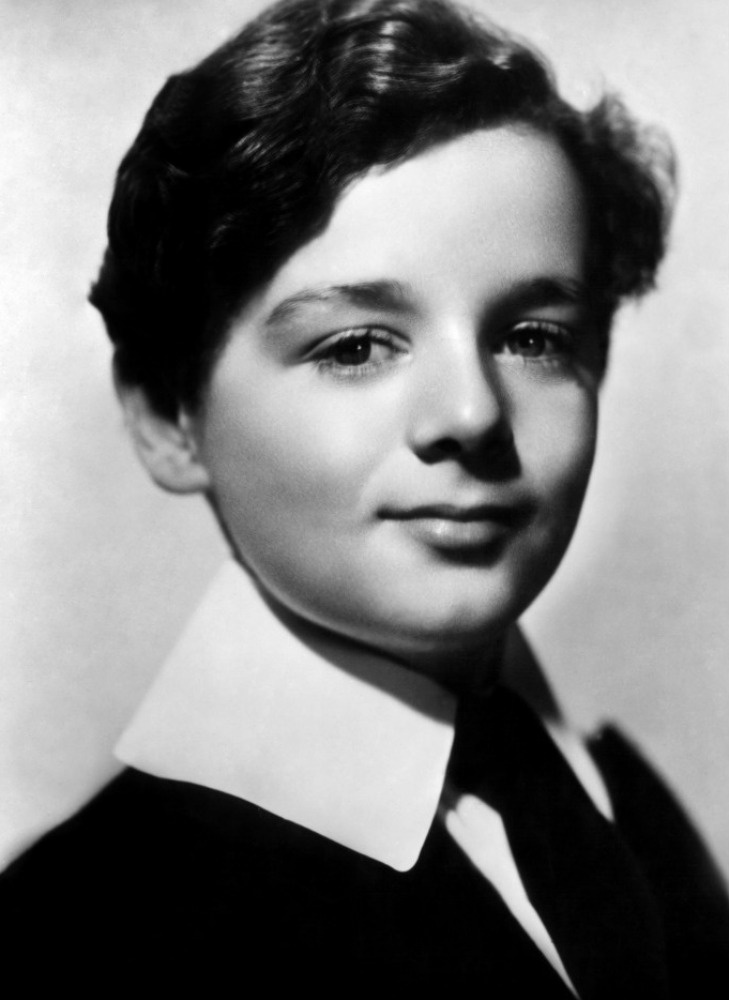
- Bartholomew in Little Lord Fauntleroy (1936)
- Born: Frederick Cecil Bartholomew; March 28, 1924; Harlesden, London, England
- Died: January 23, 1992 (aged 67); Sarasota, Florida, U.S.
- Education: Italia Conti Academy of Theatre Arts
- Occupation: Actor
- Years active: 1930–1951
- Spouses: Maely Daniele (m. 1946; div. 1953); Aileen Paul (m. 1953; div. 1977); Elizabeth Grabill (m. (c. 1980)
- Children: 2

Frederick Cecil Bartholomew (March 28, 1924 – January 23, 1992), known for his acting work as Freddie Bartholomew, was an English-American child actor who was very popular in 1930s Hollywood films. His most famous starring roles are in Captains Courageous (1937) and Little Lord Fauntleroy (1936). His child acting contemporary Mickey Rooney said of him, "He was one of the finest, if not the finest child stars that we had on the scene at that time." His Captains Courageous co-star Spencer Tracy said of him "Freddie Bartholomew's acting is so fine and so simple and so true that it's way over people's heads."

Bartholomew was born in London in 1924. In 1934, for the title role of MGM's David Copperfield (1935), he immigrated to the United States at age 10, living there for the rest of his life. He became an American citizen in 1943, following World War II military service.

Despite his great success and acclaim following David Copperfield, his childhood film stardom was marred by nearly constant legal battles and payouts, which eventually took a huge toll on both his finances and his career. In adulthood, after World War II service, his film career dwindled rapidly and he switched from performing to directing and producing in the medium of television.

== Biography ==
=== Early life ===
Bartholomew was born Frederick Cecil Bartholomew in March 1924, in Harlesden, in the borough of Willesden, Middlesex, London. His parents were Cecil Llewellyn Bartholomew, a wounded World War I veteran who became a minor civil servant after the war, and Lilian May Clarke Bartholomew. By age three, Freddie was living in Warminster, a town in Wiltshire in South West England, in his paternal grandparents' home. He lived under the care of his "Aunt Cissie" (Millicent Mary Bartholomew), who raised him and became his surrogate mother. Bartholomew was educated at Lord Weymouth's Grammar School in Warminster, and by his Aunt Cissie.

=== Child star ===
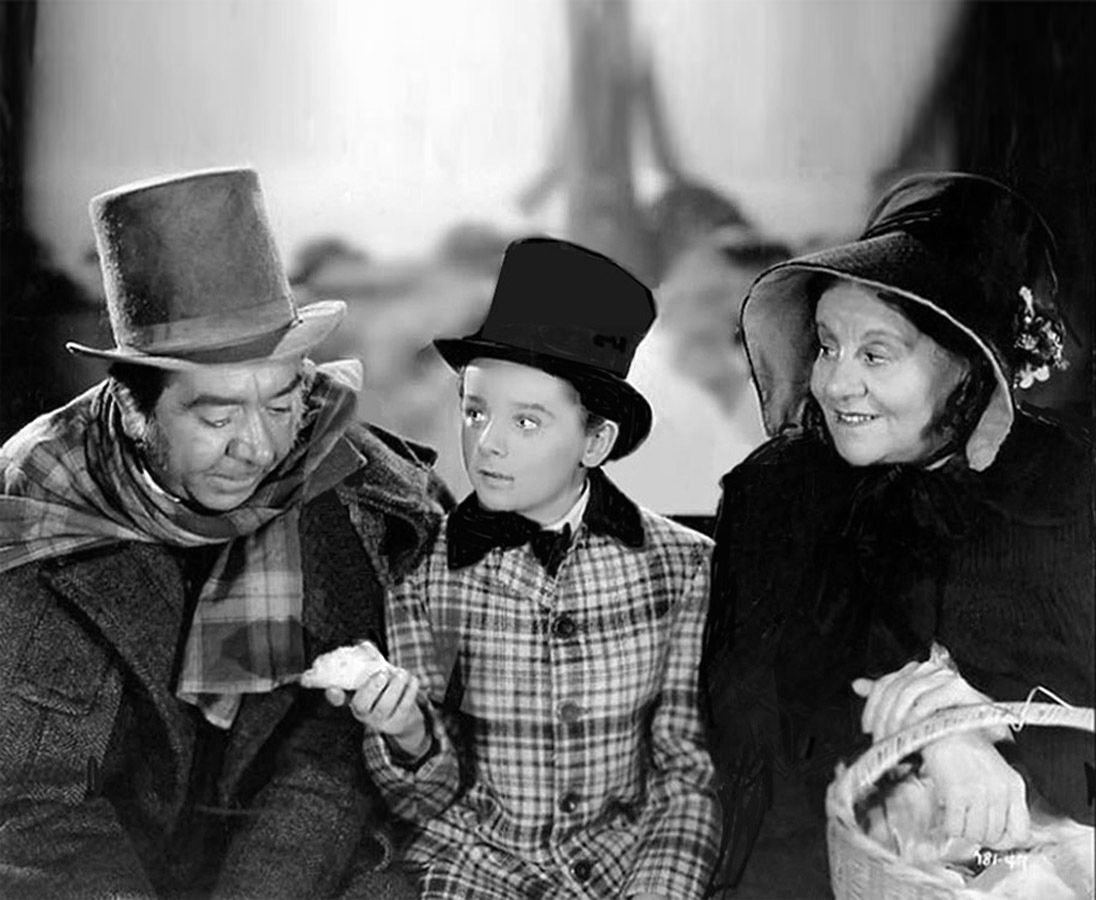
Herbert Mundin, Bartholomew and Jessie Ralph in David Copperfield (1935)

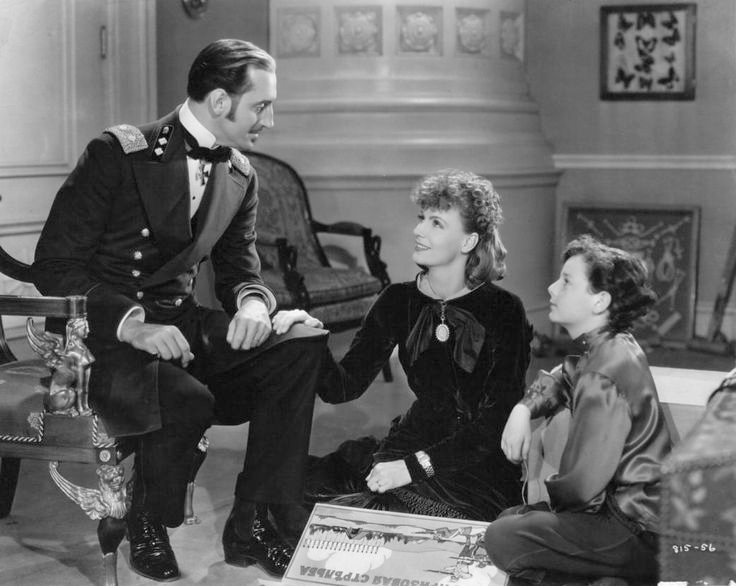
Basil Rathbone, Greta Garbo and Bartholomew in Anna Karenina (1935)

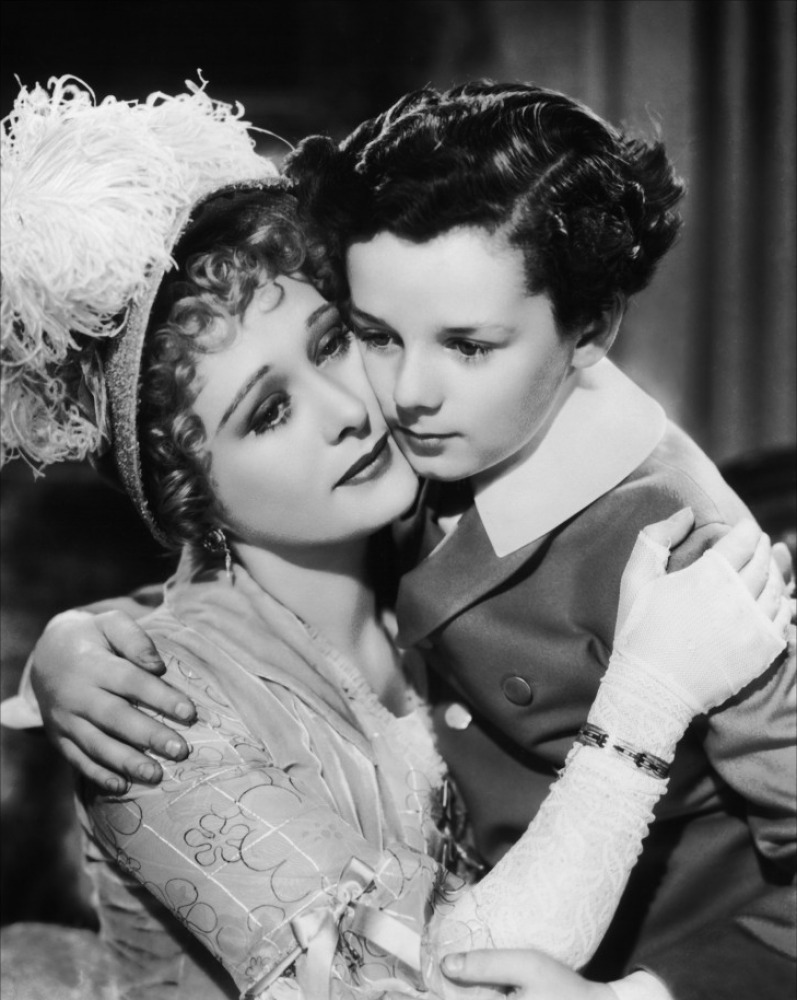
Dolores Costello and Bartholomew in Little Lord Fauntleroy (1936)

==== From England to Hollywood ====
In Warminster, Bartholomew was a precocious actor and was reciting and performing from age three. By age five, he was a popular Warminster celebrity, the "boy wonder elocutionist", reciting poems, prose, and selections from various plays, including Shakespeare. He sang and danced as well. His first film role came at age six, in 1930.

He also pursued acting studies at the Italia Conti Academy of Theatre Arts in London, and appeared in four minor British films. American filmmakers George Cukor and David O. Selznick saw him on a 1934 scouting trip to London and chose him for the young title role in their MGM film David Copperfield (1935). Bartholomew and his aunt immigrated to the United States in August 1934, and MGM gave him a seven-year contract.

David Copperfield, which also featured Basil Rathbone, Maureen O'Sullivan, W. C. Fields, and Lionel Barrymore, was a success, and made Bartholomew an overnight star. He was subsequently cast in a succession of film productions with some of the most popular stars of the day. Among his successes of the 1930s were Anna Karenina (1935) with Greta Garbo and Fredric March; Professional Soldier (1935) with Victor McLaglen and Gloria Stuart; Little Lord Fauntleroy (1936) with Dolores Costello and C. Aubrey Smith; Lloyd's of London (1937) with Madeleine Carroll and Tyrone Power; The Devil is a Sissy (1936) with Mickey Rooney and Jackie Cooper; and Captains Courageous (1937) with Spencer Tracy.

Captains Courageous was the movie he most enjoyed working on. The film took an entire year to make, and much of it was shot off the coasts of Florida and Catalina Island, California. He later recalled, "For a kid, it was like one long outing. Spencer Tracy, Lionel Barrymore, Mickey Rooney, Melvyn Douglas and I – we all grew very close toward one another in those 12 months. When the shooting was finished, we cried like a bunch of babies as we said our goodbyes."

His acting skills, open and personable presence, emotional range, refined English diction, and angelic looks made him a box-office favorite. He quickly became the second-highest-paid child movie star, after Shirley Temple. Ring Lardner Jr. had high praise for him, saying of his performance as the star of Little Lord Fauntleroy, "He is on the screen almost constantly, and his performance is a valid characterization, which is almost unique in a child actor, and, indeed, in three fourths of adult motion-picture stars." Of his role as the protagonist of Captains Courageous, Frank Nugent of The New York Times wrote, "Young Master Bartholomew ... plays Harvey faultlessly."

When production on Captains Courageous wrapped, co-star Spencer Tracy, who portrayed a Portuguese sailor named Manuel, told Modern Screen:

Well, I got away with it. Want to know why? Because of Freddie, because of that kid's performance, because he sold it 98 per cent. The kid had to believe in Manuel, or Manuel wasn't worth a quarter. The way he would look at me, believe every word I said, made me believe in it myself. I've never said this before, and I'll never say it again. Freddie Bartholomew's acting is so fine and so simple and so true that it's way over people's heads. It'll only be by thinking back two or three years from now that they'll realize how great it was.

==== Legal battles with birth parents and MGM contract troubles ====
By April 1936, following the very popular Little Lord Fauntleroy, Bartholomew's success and level of fame caused his long-estranged birth parents to attempt to gain custody of him and his fortune. A legal battle of nearly seven years ensued, resulting in nearly all the wealth that Bartholomew amassed being spent on attorneys' and court fees, and payouts to his birth parents and two sisters.

The extreme financial drain of his birth parents' ongoing custody battles prompted Bartholomew's aunt to demand a raise in his salary from MGM in July 1937, leveraged by the huge success of Captains Courageous. She threatened to break his MGM contract to find a better-paying studio. The contract battle kept him out of work for a year, causing, among other things, the postponement and eventual loss of his planned lead in a film of Rudyard Kipling's Kim, and the loss of his planned lead in Thoroughbreds Don't Cry with Judy Garland and Mickey Rooney.

He eventually resumed acting through 1942, in mostly lesser-quality films and roles, only three out of 11 of which were with MGM, and after 1938, he was less popular than in his heyday. This fall in popularity stemmed not only from the quality of the roles and his conflicts with MGM, but also from the fact that, by late 1938, he was a tall, nearly 6-foot teenager, and the fact that the world was focusing on the growing problems of World War II, thus the literary classics and costume dramas at which Bartholomew excelled were less in fashion.

In 1938, Twentieth Century Fox hired Bartholomew for the lead in its film of Robert Louis Stevenson's Kidnapped. MGM then re-teamed him for the fourth and fifth times with Mickey Rooney in Lord Jeff (1938) and A Yank at Eton (1942), and he co-starred with Judy Garland in the lightweight MGM musical Listen, Darling in 1938.

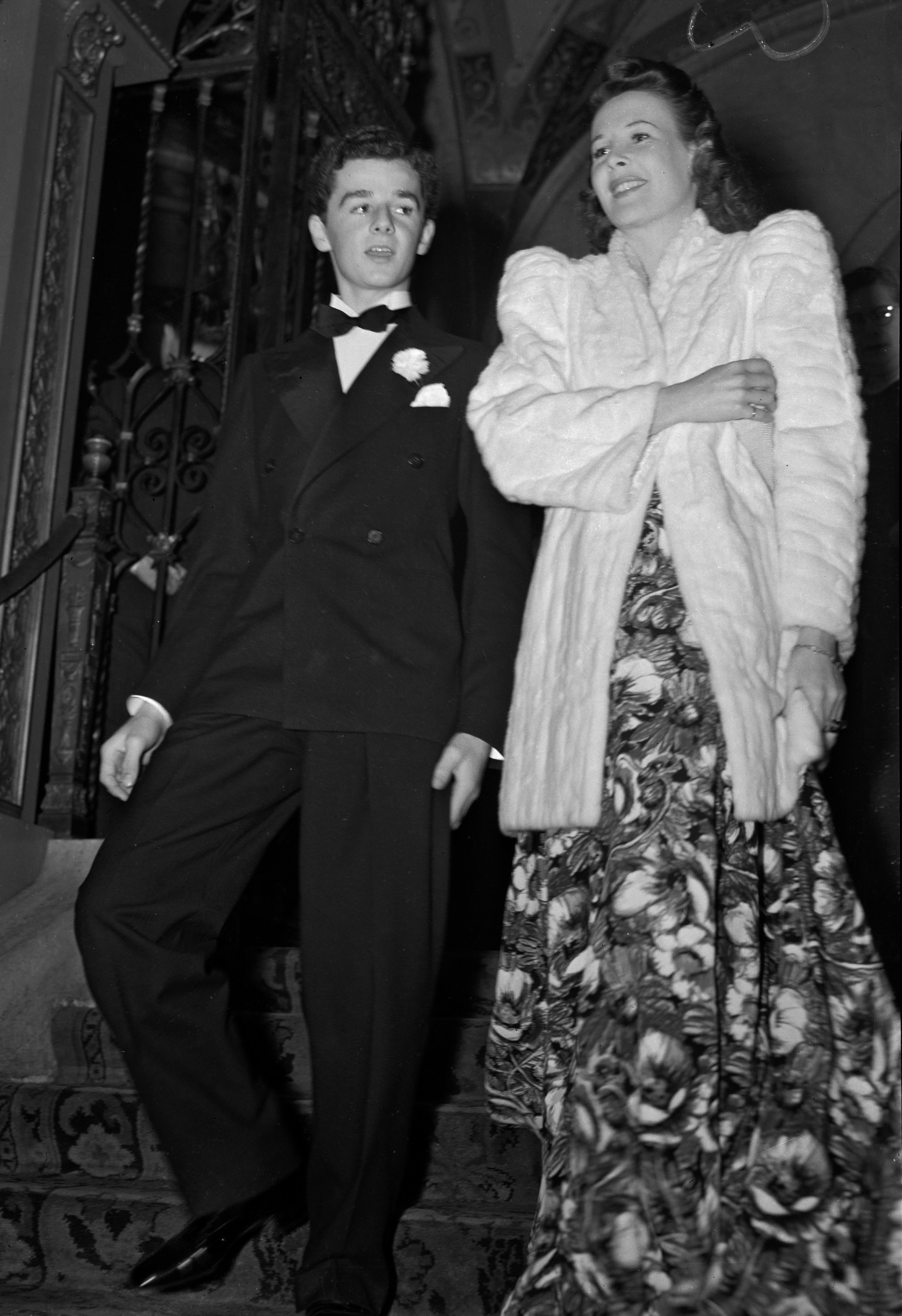
Bartholomew with Wendy Barrie (1940)

In 1939, Universal re-teamed him for the third and fourth times with Jackie Cooper in The Spirit of Culver and Two Bright Boys. For RKO distribution, he performed in Swiss Family Robinson and Tom Brown's School Days in 1940. And as World War II deepened, Columbia had him star in three military-related films: Naval Academy (1941), Cadets on Parade (1942), and Junior Army (1942).

=== World War II and beyond ===
==== Enlistment and aftermath ====
World War II military service interrupted Bartholomew's career even further. He enlisted in the U.S. Army Air Forces on January 13, 1943, at the age of 18, and worked in aircraft maintenance. During training he fell and injured his back, was hospitalized for seven months, and was discharged on January 12, 1944.

He had one film role in 1944, in the low-budget comedy The Town Went Wild. The film reunited him with Jimmy Lydon, with whom he had starred in Tom Brown's School Days, Naval Academy, and Cadets on Parade. This ended up being Bartholomew's penultimate film performance, and his last for seven years. His efforts to revive his film career were unsuccessful; and efforts performing in regional theaters and vaudeville did not spark a comeback either.

After distressing experiences including a devastating auto accident and performing unsuccessfully in a play in Los Angeles, in 1946 Bartholomew married publicist Maely Daniele. Daniele, six years his senior, was a twice-divorced woman, and his marriage to her caused a serious and permanent rift with his aunt, who moved back to England. The marriage was not a happy one.

In 1946, he was in a radio play, in an episode of Inner Sanctum Mystery. In 1947, he appeared as himself in a five-minute cameo in the otherwise all-black musical film Sepia Cinderella, relating his post-war efforts to have a successful vaudeville routine and telling a few gags onscreen. He spent most of 1948 touring small American theaters, and in November 1948, left without his wife for an Australian tour as a nightclub singing, patter, and piano act.

==== Switch to television and off-camera work ====
On his return to the United States in 1949, and in rather desperate circumstances, he switched to the new and burgeoning medium of television. He shifted from performer to television host and director to television producer and executive. Preferring to be known as Fred C. Bartholomew, he became the television director of independent television station WPIX in New York City from 1949 through 1954. His final acting role was as a priest in the 1951 film St. Benny the Dip.

He divorced his first wife in 1953, and in December of that year, he married television chef and author Aileen Paul, whom he had met at WPIX. With her, he had a daughter, Kathleen Millicent Bartholomew, born in March 1956, and a son, Frederick R. Bartholomew, born in 1958. The family, including stepdaughter, Celia Ann Paul, lived in Leonia, New Jersey.

This was an era in which advertising firms created and produced radio and television shows. In 1954, Bartholomew began working for Benton & Bowles, a New York advertising agency, as a television producer and director. At Benton & Bowles, he produced shows, such as The Andy Griffith Show, and produced or directed several television soap operas, including As the World Turns, The Edge of Night, and Search for Tomorrow. In 1964 he was made a vice president of radio and television at the company.

Bartholomew and his second wife Aileen Paul divorced in 1977. By 1982 he had remarried, and remained married to his third wife, Elizabeth Grabill, for the rest of his life.

== Illness, final years, and death ==
Suffering from emphysema, he retired from television by the late 1980s. He eventually moved with his family to Bradenton, Florida. In 1991, he was filmed in several interview segments for the documentary miniseries MGM: When the Lion Roars (1992). He died of heart failure in Sarasota, Florida in January 1992, at the age of 67.

== Honors ==
- On April 4, 1936, Bartholomew placed his handprints, footprints, and signature in front of Grauman's Chinese Theatre.
- In 1960, he received a motion pictures star on the Hollywood Walk of Fame at 6663 Hollywood Boulevard for his contributions to the film industry.
- He is one of the 250 Greatest Male Screen Legends nominated by the American Film Institute in 1999 as part of their AFI's 100 Years...100 Stars selection.

== Filmography ==
- Toyland (1930, Short)
- Fascination (1931) – Child
- Lily Christine (1932) – Child (uncredited)
- Strip! Strip! Hooray!!! (1932, Short) – Boy (uncredited)
- David Copperfield (1935) – David Copperfield as a boy
- Anna Karenina (1935) – Sergei
- Professional Soldier (1935) – King Peter II
- Little Lord Fauntleroy (1936) – Cedric "Ceddie" Errol, Lord Fauntleroy
- The Devil is a Sissy (1936) – Claude
- Lloyd's of London (1936) – Jonathan Blake as a boy
- Captains Courageous (1937) – Harvey Cheyne
- Kidnapped (1938) – David Balfour
- Lord Jeff (1938) – Geoffrey Braemer
- Listen, Darling (1938) – 'Buzz' Mitchell
- The Spirit of Culver (1939) – Bob Randolph
- Two Bright Boys (1939) – David Harrington
- Swiss Family Robinson (1940) – Jack Robinson
- Tom Brown's School Days (1940) – Ned East
- Naval Academy (1941) – Steve Kendall
- Cadets on Parade (1942) – Austin Shannon
- A Yank at Eton (1942) – Peter Carlton
- Junior Army (1942) – Freddie Hewlett
- The Town Went Wild (1944) – David Conway
- Sepia Cinderella (1947) – Himself
- St. Benny the Dip (1951) – Reverend Wilbur

== Mentions in popular culture ==
The seven-minute Warner Bros. cartoon The Major Lied 'Til Dawn (1938) includes a caricature of Bartholomew as his Little Lord Fauntleroy role.

He was also caricatured, along with many other Hollywood celebrities, in the eight-minute 1938 Disney cartoon Mother Goose Goes Hollywood – in this case as his character from the film Captains Courageous. As in the film, Freddie falls into the sea and is saved by Spencer Tracy's character.

A non-alcoholic cocktail – a parallel of the Shirley Temple – which combines ginger ale with lime juice, known as a "Freddie Bartholomew cocktail", is named for him.

Although his name is not mentioned, he is referred to in J. D. Salinger's The Catcher in the Rye, as a figure whom Holden Caulfield looks like – specifically, Bartholomew's most iconic role as Harvey Cheyne in Captains Courageous (1937), referred to by the character Sunny as the kid in the movie "who falls off [a] boat".

== Sources ==
- Hoerle, Helen. The Story of Freddie Bartholomew. Akron, Ohio: Saalfield Publishing Company, 1935.
