= Underwater! =

1955 adventure film by John Sturges

- Directed by: John Sturges
- Screenplay by: Walter Newman
- Story by: Hugh King; Robert B. Bailey
- Produced by: Harry Tatelman; Howard Hughes (executive producer)
- Starring: Jane Russell; Richard Egan; Gilbert Roland; Lori Nelson
- Cinematography: Harry J. Wild
- Edited by: Stuart Gilmore; Frederic Knudtson
- Music by: Roy Webb
- Distributed by: RKO Radio Pictures
- Release date: February 9, 1955 (US)
- Running time: 99 minutes
- Country: United States
- Language: English
- Budget: $2 million
- Box office: $2.2 million (US rentals)

Underwater! is a 1955 adventure film starring Jane Russell, Richard Egan, and Gilbert Roland, and directed by John Sturges.

== Plot ==
Johnny and his wife Theresa, along with mercenary Dominic Quesada, priest Father Cannon, and Gloria, the boat owner, search for sunken treasure in the Caribbean. While on a dive, they come across a wreck that they assume holds treasure. When they resurface, they are confronted by a boat of local shark-hunters with an unhealthy curiosity in their activities. In their effort to find funding to raise the wreck, they discover that what they are looking for is a 17th-century ship that contains a life-size solid gold Madonna encrusted in precious gems and that it lies in a different underwater location. So they make plans to acquire it. However, it is on the edge of a precipice, and the shark-hunters intend for them to do all the difficult and dangerous recovery, then take the treasure from them.

== Cast ==
- Jane Russell – Theresa Gray
- Richard Egan – Johnny Gray
- Gilbert Roland – Dominic Quesada
- Lori Nelson – Gloria
- Robert Keith – Father Cannon
- Joseph Calleia – Rico Herrera
- Eugene Iglesias – Miguel Vega
- Ric Roman – Jesus

== Production ==
Howard Hughes acquired the rights to the unpublished The Big Rainbow.

Partially filmed on location in Mexico and Hawaii, Underwater! was completed in a newly constructed underwater tank in an RKO Radio Pictures soundstage. It was the first RKO film released in Superscope. The film's budget increased from its initial $300,000 and a large amount of the budget was used on footage cut from the film.

Lori Nelson claimed Howard Hughes wanted her for the lead and paid Universal Pictures for her use; however, Jane Russell owed RKO a film. The lead was given to Russell with a part written for Nelson so she could keep her fee.

== Soundtrack ==
The film contained the songs "Cherry Pink and Apple Blossom White" and "Rhythm Sticks" performed by Perez "Prez" Prado and his Orchestra ("The King of the Mambo").

== Release ==
For its world premiere on January 10, 1955, the film was projected on a submerged movie screen at Silver Springs, Florida, and members of the press viewed the film 20 feet underwater while wearing aqualungs.

The song "Cherry Pink and Apple Blossom White" featured in the film became a major hit.

== See also ==
- List of American films of 1955

== Works cited ==
- Medved, Harry; Medved, Michael (1984). The Hollywood Hall of Shame: The Most Expensive Flops in Movie History. Angus & Robertson. ISBN 0207149291.
