= J. M. Kerrigan =

Irish actor (1884–1964)

J.M. Kerrigan
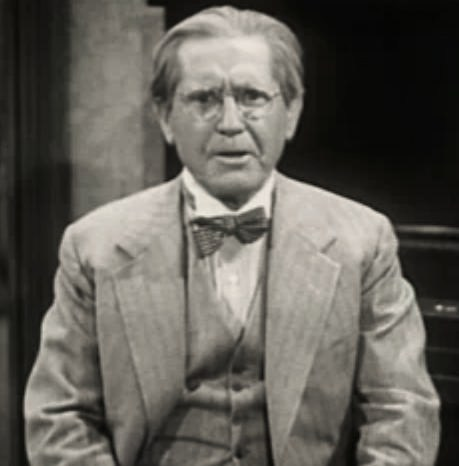
- Kerrigan in Undercover Agent (1939)
- Born: Joseph Michael Kerrigan; 16 December 1884; Dublin, Ireland
- Died: 29 April 1964 (aged 79); Hollywood, California, U.S.
- Resting place: Holy Cross Cemetery
- Occupation: Actor
- Years active: 1907–1960

Joseph Michael Kerrigan (16 December 1884 – 29 April 1964) was an Irish actor.

== Early life ==
Joseph Michael Kerrigan was born on 16 December 1884 in Dublin, which was part of the United Kingdom of Great Britain and Ireland at that time. He studied at Belvedere College and worked as a newspaperman.

== Career ==
In 1907, Kerrigan joined the Irish National Theatre, later known as the Abbey Players. There he became a stalwart, appearing in plays by Lady Gregory, William Butler Yeats and John Millington Synge (for whom he created the role of Shawn Keogh in The Playboy of the Western World). He toured with the company to New York City in 1908 and again in 1911, when their American premiere of The Playboy of the Western World met with riotous disapproval. By the 1920s he was appearing on Broadway, often in plays by Shakespeare, Ibsen, and Sheridan. In 1924, he and Abbey colleague Dudley Digges appeared in Sutton Vane's Outward Bound, along with Alfred Lunt, Leslie Howard, Margalo Gillmore, and Beryl Mercer. All in all, he played in 35 Broadway productions in his career.

His first screen appearance was in Food of Love, one of six silent films he did in 1916. He settled permanently in Hollywood in 1935, having been recruited along with several other Abbey performers to appear in John Ford's The Informer. In this film and in Ford's The Long Voyage Home, he played similar roles, that of a leech who attaches himself to men until they run out of money. Perhaps his best-known role was in The General Died at Dawn, wherein he plays a character named Leach, a sinister thief who, holding a gun on Cooper, says: "I may be fat, but I'm agile."

He had little screen time in films in which he had minor roles, such as the First Drayman in Merely Mary Ann (1931) with Janet Gaynor. One of his more recognizable roles was in Gone with the Wind (1939), in which he played John Gallegher, the seemly jovial mill owner who whips his convict labor into "co-operation". He appeared in Walt Disney's 20,000 Leagues Under the Sea (1954), the film version of Jules Verne's 1870 novel, in a minor role at the beginning of the film.

In a 1946 attempt to reach Broadway, Kerrigan starred as the discombobulated leprechaun Jackeen J. O'Malley in the show Barnaby and Mr. O'Malley, based on the Crockett Johnson comic strip. The play was unsuccessful, completing only four performances. Kerrigan made his final Broadway appearance later that year, however, in Guthrie McClintic's revival of The Playboy of the Western World, this time playing Michael James Flaherty. Over his career, he had roles in 114 short and feature-length motion pictures, and between 1952 and 1960 he appeared in episodes of 15 different TV series.

Kerrigan died in Hollywood on 29 April 1964, aged 79. He has a star on the Hollywood Walk of Fame at 6621 Hollywood Blvd.

== Partial filmography ==
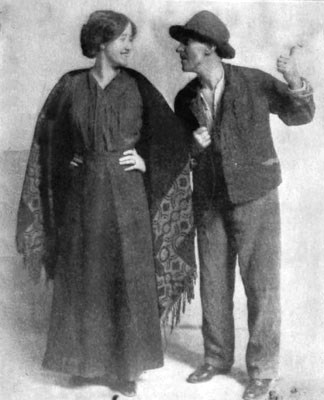
Kerrigan with Sara Allgood in 1911

- Little Old New York (1923) – John O'Day (film debut)
- Lucky in Love (1929) – Connors
- New Movietone Follies of 1930 (1930) – Gateman in Show (uncredited)
- Song o' My Heart (1930) – Peter
- Just Imagine (1930) – Traffic Policeman in 1980 (uncredited)
- Lightnin' (1930) – Judge Lemuel Townsend
- Under Suspicion (1930) – Doyle
- Don't Bet on Women (1931) – Chipley Duff
- The Black Camel (1931) – Thomas MacMasters
- Merely Mary Ann (1931) – First Drayman
- The Rainbow Trail (1932) – Paddy Harrigan
- Careless Lady (1932) – Trowbridge
- State's Attorney (1932) – Coachman (uncredited)
- Vanity Street (1932) – Dan – Irish Cop (uncredited)
- Rockabye (1932) – Fagin
- The Monkey's Paw (1933) – Cpl. O'Leary (uncredited)
- Air Hostess (1933) – Pop Kearny
- A Study in Scarlet (1933) – Jabez Wilson
- Paddy the Next Best Thing (1933) – Collins
- Lone Cowboy (1933) – Mr. Curran
- The Lost Patrol (1934) – Quincannon
- A Modern Hero (1934) – Mr. Ryan
- The Key (1934) – O'Duffy
- Treasure Island (1934) – Tom Morgan – Pirate (uncredited)
- The Fountain (1934) – Shordley
- Happiness Ahead (1934) – Window Washer Boss
- The Mystery of Edwin Drood (1935) – Chief Verger Tope
- Vanessa: Her Love Story (1935) – Perkins (uncredited)
- The Informer (1935) – Terry
- Werewolf of London (1935) – Hawkins
- The Farmer Takes a Wife (1935) – Angus (uncredited)
- Hot Tip (1935) – Matt
- Barbary Coast (1935) – Judge Harper
- A Feather in Her Hat (1935) – Pobjoy
- Timothy's Quest (1936) – Dr. Cudd
- The Prisoner of Shark Island (1936) – Judge Maiben
- Laughing Irish Eyes (1936) – Tim
- Colleen (1936) – Pop Reilly
- Special Investigator (1936) – Judge Plumgate
- Hearts in Bondage (1936) – Paddy Callahan
- Spendthrift (1936) – Pop O'Connell
- The General Died at Dawn (1936) – Leach
- Lloyd's of London (1936) – Brook Watson
- Let's Make a Million (1936) – Sam Smith
- The Plough and the Stars (1936) – Uncle Peter
- The Barrier (1937) – Sergeant Thomas
- Motor Madness (1937) – Henry John 'Cap' McNeil
- London by Night (1937) – Tims
- Vacation from Love (1938) – Danny Dolan, Hansom Cabbie
- Spring Madness (1938) – Mr. Maloney (uncredited)
- Little Orphan Annie (1938) – Tom Jennings
- Ride a Crooked Mile (1938) – Sgt. Flynn
- The Great Man Votes (1939) – Hot Shot Gillings
- Boy Slaves (1939) – Brakeman (uncredited)
- The Flying Irishman (1939) – Mr. Clyde Corrigan Sr.
- The Kid from Texas (1939) – Farr
- Undercover Agent (1939) – Tom 'Pop' Madison
- Union Pacific (1939) – Monahan
- Sorority House (1939) – Lew Fisher
- The Zero Hour (1939) – Timothy
- 6,000 Enemies (1939) – Dan Barrett
- Two Bright Boys (1939) – Mike Casey
- The Witness Vanishes (1939) – Flinters
- Sabotage (1939) – Mel
- Two Thoroughbreds (1939) – Jack Lenihan
- Gone with the Wind (1939) – Johnny Gallagher
- Congo Maisie (1940) – Captain Finch
- Young Tom Edison (1940) – Mr. McCarney
- Three Cheers for the Irish (1940) – Scanlon
- Curtain Call (1940) – Mr. Middleton
- The Sea Hawk (1940) – Eli Matson
- Untamed (1940) – Angus McGavity
- One Crowded Night (1940) – Joseph
- No Time for Comedy (1940) – Jim
- The Long Voyage Home (1940) – Crimp
- Adventure in Washington (1941) – Jim O'Brien
- Appointment for Love (1941) – Timothy
- The Wolf Man (1941) – Charles Conliffe
- The Vanishing Virginian (1942) – John Phelps
- Captains of the Clouds (1942) – Foster
- Action in the North Atlantic (1943) – Caviar Jinks (uncredited)
- Mr. Lucky (1943) – Mr. McDougal (uncredited)
- The Fighting Seabees (1944) – Sawyer Collins
- Wilson (1944) – Edward Sullivan
- An American Romance (1944) – Charlie O'Rourke – Steam Shovel Operator (uncredited)
- The Big Bonanza (1944) – Judge Jasper Kincaid
- Tarzan and the Amazons (1945) – Splivens
- The Great John L. (1945) – Father O'Malley
- Crime Doctor's Warning (1945) – Robert MacPherson (uncredited)
- The Spanish Main (1945) – Pillery Gow
- She Went to the Races (1945) – Jeff Habbard
- Black Beauty (1946) – John
- Abie's Irish Rose (1946) – Patrick Murphy
- Call Northside 777 (1948) – Sullivan – Court Bailiff (uncredited)
- The Luck of the Irish (1948) – Tatie the Innkeeper
- The Fighting O'Flynn (1949) – Timothy
- Mrs. Mike (1949) – Uncle John
- Double Crossbones (1951) – Debtor (uncredited)
- Sealed Cargo (1951) – Skipper Ben
- Two of a Kind (1951) – Father Lanahan (uncredited)
- The Wild North (1952) – Callahan
- Park Row (1952) – Dan O'Rourke
- My Cousin Rachel (1952) – Reverend Pascoe
- The Silver Whip (1953) – Riley
- 20,000 Leagues Under the Sea (1954) – Old Billy
- It's a Dog's Life (1955) – Paddy Corbin
- The Fastest Gun Alive (1956) – Kevin McGovern (final film)
- Shirley Temple's Storybook (1958, TV) – The Magic Fishbone
- Tales of Wells Fargo (1959, TV) – Smalley
- Wagon Train (1959, TV) – John Reed
- The Loretta Young Show (1960, TV) – Mr. Thomas J. Flaherty
- Lock-Up (1960, TV) – Professor Caldwell (last appearance)
