= Tom Brown's School Days (1940 film) =

1940 film by Robert Stevenson

- One of theatrical release posters
- Directed by: Robert Stevenson
- Written by: Thomas Hughes (novel); Walter Ferris; Frank Cavett; Gene Towne; C. Graham Baker; Robert Stevenson (add. dialogue)
- Based on: Tom Brown's School Days by Thomas Hughes
- Produced by: C. Graham Baker; Gene Towne
- Starring: Sir Cedric Hardwicke; Freddie Bartholomew; Jimmy Lydon
- Music by: Anthony Collins
- Color process: Black and white
- Production companies: The Play's The Thing Productions, Inc.
- Distributed by: RKO Radio Pictures
- Release date: July 14, 1940
- Running time: 86 minutes
- Country: United States
- Language: English

Tom Brown's School Days is a 1940 American coming-of-age drama film about a teenage boy's experiences at Rugby School, Warwickshire, in the early 19th century under the reforming headmastership of Thomas Arnold. It stars Sir Cedric Hardwicke, Freddie Bartholomew and Jimmy Lydon in the title role. The film was based on the 1857 novel Tom Brown's School Days by Thomas Hughes.

The June 27, 1940 debut of the film version at New York City's Radio City Music Hall was chronicled in a photo spread by The New York Times, "showing some of the pastimes, curricular and otherwise", as the fight scene between Tom Brown and Flashman was captioned.

== Plot ==
A group of boys are bullied by the older boys (and Flashman in particular), with only Tom being willing to stand up to them. Honour and loyalty between schoolfriends is critical. Tom faces expulsion, not for his theft of a cart but for lying. When he eventually confesses he is spared expulsion, and Dr. Arnold gives him "12 of the best" with a smile.

== Cast ==
- Cedric Hardwicke as Dr. Thomas Arnold
- Freddie Bartholomew as Ned East
- Jimmy Lydon as Tom Brown
- Josephine Hutchinson as Mrs. Mary Arnold
- Billy Halop as Flashman
- Polly Moran as Sally Harowell
- Hughie Green as Walker
- Ian Fulton as Brooke
- Ernest Cossart as Squire Brown
- Alec Craig as Old Thomas
- Gale Storm as Effie
- Lionel Belmore as Tavern Keeper (uncredited)
- Barlowe Borland as Grimsby (uncredited)

== Reception ==
The film recorded a loss of $110,000.

The entertainment journal Variety praised the adaptation, saying, "It probably results in a better picture, since Cedric Hardwicke, who plays the wise and kindly teacher, is much better qualified to carry a story than is any Hollywood prodigy. Hardwicke’s performance is one of the best he has ever given on the screen".

In this version emphasis is placed on the development of Headmaster Thomas Arnold and his reformist ideas concerning the English public school. It was well received by critics, with Variety praising it in a December 31, 1939, review as "sympathetically and skilfully made, with many touching moments and an excellent cast". Hardwicke's performance as Arnold was called "one of the best he has ever given on the screen," as the veteran actor convincingly tempered the headmaster's strict demeanour with "the underlying sympathy, tolerance, quiet humour and steadfast courage" for which Arnold was acclaimed. Jimmy Lydon as the title character was called "believable and moving in the early portions, but too young for the final moments".

== Home media ==
The 1940 film version was released on DVD in 2004.
