= Professional Soldier =

1935 film by Tay Garnett

- Poster of Professional Soldier
- Directed by: Tay Garnett
- Screenplay by: Gene Fowler; Howard Ellis Smith
- Based on: "Gentlemen, the King!" by Damon Runyon
- Produced by: Darryl F. Zanuck
- Starring: Victor McLaglen; Freddie Bartholomew
- Cinematography: Rudolph Maté
- Edited by: Barbara McLean
- Production company: Twentieth Century Fox
- Release date: December 27, 1935
- Running time: 75 minutes
- Country: United States
- Language: English

Professional Soldier is a 1935 American adventure film based on a 1931 story by Damon Runyon, "Gentlemen, the King!" It stars Victor McLaglen and Freddie Bartholomew. The film was directed by Tay Garnett, and produced by Twentieth Century Fox.

A soldier of fortune is hired to kidnap a king, only to find the target is a young boy.

== Plot ==
Colonel Michael Donovan, a soldier of fortune and former U.S. Marine captain, is fed up with his latest job: keeping spoiled playboy George Foster out of trouble from women and liquor in Paris. Thus, he is eager to accept when revolutionaries Valdis and Ledgard want to hire him to kidnap King Peter II, ruler of a country somewhere in the Balkans. When a drunken Foster wakes up and interrupts their meeting, Donovan calls him his aide.

Donovan and Foster reconnoiter at a masquerade ball held at the king's palace, but King Peter II does not make an appearance. Foster quickly falls in love with a woman there named Sonia.

When the two men sneak back into the palace later that night, they are surprised to discover that King Peter II is just a boy. Donovan is too disgusted to want to abduct him, though Peter is thrilled at the idea of an adventure, thinking Donovan and Foster are Chicago gangsters, as were the protagonists in Damon Runyan's original story. However, when Countess Sonia stumbles upon the scene and raises the alarm, Donovan has no choice. Peter helpfully shows him a secret escape passage; a bound and gagged Sonia reluctantly goes with them to take care of the lad.

As prearranged, the kidnappers take Peter to Lady Augusta, who turns out to be Peter's former nurse. Donovan's employers succeed in overthrowing Gino, the leader of the government, and installing their own reform government under the leadership of Stefan Bernaldo.

As time goes on, Donovan becomes very fond of Peter and vice versa. Donovan teaches Peter to play baseball and shoot craps, and entertains Peter with tall tales of his wartime exploits. At the same time Foster convinces Sonia he really does love her. However, that does not sway her from what she sees as her duty; she manages to send a message from a gypsy camp to Gino revealing where the king is being held. Peter and Donovan initially evade Gino's men, but are recaptured within sight of the palace.

Peter orders Gino to release Donovan unharmed, but Gino secretly has him imprisoned. Gino tells supporter Prince Edric to start rumors that the new regime has killed the very popular king. Edric is aghast, grasping the implication that Gino intends to murder Peter. Sonia also realizes her mistake and frees Donovan and Foster. With Foster's help, Donovan defeats the enemy by hand holding a M1917 Browning machine gun where he kills or captures all 250 of Gino's men just in time to save Peter from a firing squad. When Gino resists, Donovan shoots him. Later, a grateful Peter bestows a decoration on Donovan before they tearfully part.

== Cast ==
- Victor McLaglen as Michael Donovan
- Freddie Bartholomew as King Peter
- Gloria Stuart as Countess Sonia
- Constance Collier as Lady Augusta
- Michael Whalen as George Foster
- C. Henry Gordon as Gino
- Pedro de Cordoba as Stefan Bernaldo
- Lumsden Hare as Paul Valdis
- Walter Kingsford as Christian Ledgard
- Lester Matthews as Prince Edric
- Rita Hayworth as Gypsy dancer (uncredited)

== Reception ==
In The New York Times, Frank Nugent wrote "Professional Soldier is incongruous, it is loud and, intermittently, it is funny. ... Although there are long moments when nothing happens, the picture is rousingly comic in the scenes devoted to Colonel Mike's battles, and it has some claim to fame in presenting the most amazing co-starring team in screen history – Victor McLaglen and little Freddie Bartholomew."

Writing for The Spectator in 1936, Graham Greene gave the film a poor review, summarizing it as one that "should be carefully avoided", and said Freddie Bartholomew "recites his words by rote".

The 2015 DVD Talk review of the film calls it "an enjoyable – if often sketchy – big screen adventure", adding that "To its credit, you don't really care that Professional Soldier bounces nonsensically around ... because the dialogue is light and amusing ... while the players, particularly McLaglen and Bartholomew, are charming together."
