= Lloyd's of London (film) =

1936 film by Henry King

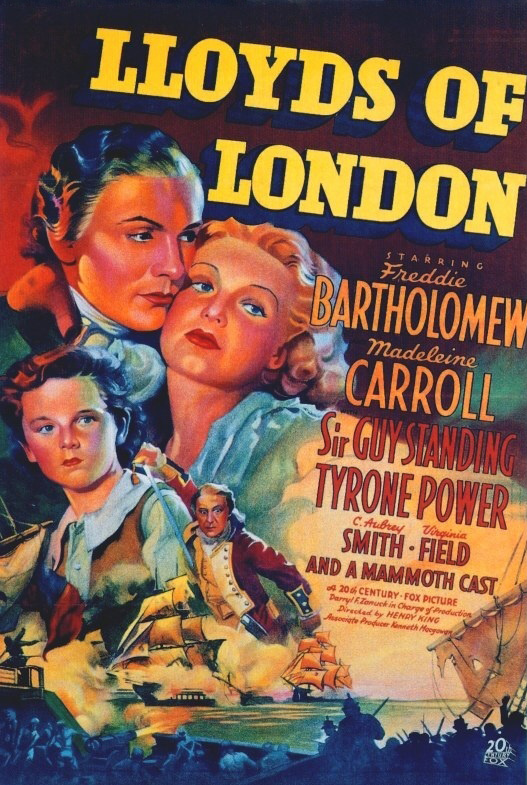
- Theatrical release poster
- Directed by: Henry King
- Written by: Walter Ferris; Curtis Kenyon; Ernest Pascal
- Produced by: Darryl F. Zanuck; Kenneth Macgowan
- Starring: Freddie Bartholomew; Madeleine Carroll; Guy Standing; Tyrone Power
- Cinematography: Bert Glennon
- Edited by: Barbara McLean
- Music by: R.H. Bassett; David Buttolph; Cyril J. Mockridge
- Production company: 20th Century Fox
- Distributed by: 20th Century Fox
- Release date: November 25, 1936
- Running time: 115 minutes
- Country: United States
- Language: English
- Budget: $850,000–$1,000,000
- Box office: $2 million

Lloyd's of London is a 1936 American historical drama film directed by Henry King. It stars Freddie Bartholomew, Tyrone Power, Madeleine Carroll, and Guy Standing. The supporting cast includes George Sanders, Virginia Field, and C. Aubrey Smith. Loosely based on historical events, the film follows the dealings of a man who works at Lloyd's of London during the Napoleonic Wars. Lloyd's of London was a hit; it demonstrated that 22-year-old Tyrone Power, in his first starring role, could carry a film, and that the newly formed 20th Century Fox was a major Hollywood studio.

== Plot ==
In 1770, youngster Jonathan Blake overhears two sailors discussing something suspicious in his aunt's ale-house in a Norfolk fishing village. He persuades his more respectable best friend, Horatio Nelson, to sneak aboard the sailors' ship with him. They overhear a plot involving insurance fraud. Jonathan decides to warn the insurers, walking 100 miles to London to Lloyd's Coffee House, where the insurers conduct their business. Mr. Angerstein, the head of one of the syndicates there, listens to him and is saved from a great loss. When asked, Angerstein explains to Jonathan that waiters at Lloyd's are also insurance auctioneers. Instead of a monetary reward, Jonathan asks to work as a waiter.

Many years later, when he is a grown man and Lloyd's has moved and become Lloyd's of London, Jonathan shows Angerstein a system of semaphore telegraph apparatuses he has invented, which can relay messages across the English Channel in five minutes. Around the turn of the century, while gathering news in France disguised as a French priest, he rescues Elizabeth, a secretive young Englishwoman picked up by the French after Napoleon orders the arrest of all English people. On the boat trip back to England, they fall in love. Elizabeth departs before Jonathan learns her full name and residence, but he finds out her address from the driver who transported her. He calls on her uninvited and learns that she is Lady Stacy, married to Lord Everett Stacy, a caddish gambler who has been frequently refused admission to the syndicates at Lloyd's. Insulted at being dismissed by Stacy as a mere "waiter" at Lloyd's, Jonathan vows to make himself so rich and powerful that even the aristocracy will have to pay him respect. (Note: The plot is loose with its historical references in this sequence. The order to arrest all Englishmen in France came in early 1803. During their boat escape, Jonathan and Elizabeth exchange references to Nelson's affair with Lady Hamilton in Naples, which began in 1798 but did not become grist for scandal and gossip until 1801. News posts sequences in the coffee house then advance time from December 1799 to May 1803.)

Within a few years, Jonathan has his own very successful syndicate, but he has become cynical and hardened. He meets Lord and Lady Stacy again and begins seeing her in secret. Stacy, with heavy gambling losses and hounded by creditors, inveigles Jonathan to give him a share of the profits of his syndicate by insinuating he will expose them. War with France results in disastrous losses in 1805 that threaten to bankrupt Lloyd's.

When the insurers raise their rates, British shipowners refuse to sail unless the old rates are restored. Angerstein proposes that the old rates be restored by persuading the Admiralty to provide armed escorts to the merchant vessels. But Horatio Nelson now commands the Royal Navy's Mediterranean Fleet and Jonathan objects that such a course would halve Nelson's fleet at a time when it needs to keep the French fleet blockaded in Toulon, threatening England's survival. He commits his syndicate to the old rates without escorts, single-handedly keeping British commerce going and Nelson's force intact. Stacy hounds Jonathan for funds, but as the losses mount, the syndicate runs out of money and he refuses. Elizabeth agrees to give her newly inherited fortune to Stacy in return for a divorce. However, the French fleet escapes Nelson's blockade anyway and Jonathan is abandoned by his syndicate members. Elizabeth forsakes her divorce and puts her fortune at Jonathan's disposal over his protests. Soon even this runs out.

Lord Drayton, First Lord of the Admiralty and Stacy's uncle, agrees to order half of Nelson's fleet to convoy the merchant ships. Before the order can be sent, Jonathan receives a letter from Nelson thanking him for his sacrifices and urging him "at all costs" to protect his fleet from being divided. Jonathan sends a false message from France reporting a victory by Nelson. Stacy, however, learns that Jonathan was in Calais on the day the message was sent and goes to Angerstein. Angerstein warns him that if he denounces Jonathan, he himself will be ruined because Elizabeth's fortune is tied up in the syndicate as well. Stacy finds Jonathan and Elizabeth in each other's arms and shoots his rival in the back. Jonathan, however, has bought enough time for Nelson to win the Battle of Trafalgar, although Nelson is killed. A recovering Jonathan watches from the window as his friend's funeral procession passes by.

== Cast ==
- Freddie Bartholomew as Jonathan Blake (as a boy)
- Madeleine Carroll as Lady Elizabeth
- Sir Guy Standing as John Julius Angerstein
- Tyrone Power as Jonathan Blake
- C. Aubrey Smith as Old "Q"
- Virginia Field as Polly [a waitress at the coffee house who loves Jonathan]
- Douglas Scott as Horatio Nelson
- George Sanders as Lord Everett Stacy
- J. M. Kerrigan as Brook Watson
- Una O'Connor as Widow Blake [Jonathan's aunt]
- Forrester Harvey as Percival Potts
- Gavin Muir as Sir Gavin Gore
- E. E. Clive as Magistrate
- Miles Mander as Jukes
- Montagu Love as Hawkins
- Arthur Hohl as 1st. Captain
- Robert Greig as Lord Drayton
- Lumsden Hare as Captain Suckling
- Will Stanton as Smutt
- Murray Kinnell as Reverend Nelson
- Billy Bevan as Innkeeper
- Elsa Buchanan as Servant Girl
- Georges Renavent as French Lieutenant
- Reginald Barlow as 2nd. Captain
- May Beatty as Lady Markham
- Lester Matthews as Captain Hardy
- Vernon Steele as Sir Thomas Lawrence
- Barlowe Borland as Joshua Lamb
- Hugh Huntley as Prince of Wales
- Charles Croker-King as Willoughby
- Ivan Simpson as Old Man
- Holmes Herbert as Spokesman
- Charles McNaughton as Waiter
- Leonard Mudie as Waiter
- Charles Coleman as Waiter
- Thomas Pogue as Benjamin Franklin
- Yorke Sherwood as Dr. Sam Johnson
- Arthur Blake as Member of Jonathan's Syndicate (uncredited)
- Winter Hall as Dr. Beatty (uncredited)
- Olaf Hytten as Telescope Man (uncredited)

== Reception ==
The New York Times wrote, "Lloyd's of London ... is a pleasing photoplay, crammed with authentic detail of the Georgian England where its scene is laid ... threaded by a semi-fictional story of romance and business daring. Under the graphic direction of the veteran Henry King, a cast that is capable down to its merest fishmonger and chimney sweep brings alive to the screen the London of the waning years of the eighteenth century and the early years of the next ...." Writing for The Spectator, Graham Greene gave the film a mildly positive review, characterizing it as "a fairly astute piece of sentimentality which occasionally overreaches itself". Greene's chief complaint was about the film's authenticity in that the stage would at times become "a little too packed with historical figures rather oddly juxtaposed", and that the mannerisms of Madeleine Carroll and the overall dialogue made it instantly obvious that this was an American film.

Variety reviewed the film in December, 1936 and described it as “an over-sentimentalized and highly fictitious historical subterfuge” but stated that it contained “some splendid acting”. The review noted Douglas Scott was “a kid to watch for in future films” and that Madeleine Carroll was “coming ahead” in her stature as a leading lady. The reviewer saw the greatest future potential in Tyrone Power, writing “He’s a new hand in films, having played only a couple of bits previously. He’s okay. He’s going places. He has looks and he has acting ability. The women ought to go for him in a big way.”

In their March, 1937 edition, Modern Screen gave the film a three-star review and commented that it was “superior screen fare” and that “a good deal of its appeal is due to its excellent cast.” It praised the work of Freddie Bartholomew and Douglas Scott and declared that “Tyrone Power …. has all the attributes of a new screen hero. George Sanders …. is admirable as the villain of the piece, and there are fine performances by Sir Guy Standing, J. M. Kerrigan and C. Aubrey Smith. Madeleine Carroll, in the feminine lead, is both beautiful and competent, although the work of Virginia Field, as an alehouse maid, has more warmth and fire.

The film was nominated for two Academy Awards, one for Best Art Direction by William S. Darling and the other for Best Film Editing by Barbara McLean. Lloyd's of London was the second of the 29 films directed by Henry King that McLean edited.
