= Two Bright Boys =

- Theatrical release poster
- Directed by: Joseph Santley
- Screenplay by: Val Burton; Edmund Hartmann
- Produced by: Burt Kelly
- Starring: Jackie Cooper; Freddie Bartholomew; Alan Dinehart; Melville Cooper; Dorothy Peterson; J. M. Kerrigan
- Cinematography: Elwood Bredell
- Edited by: Philip Cahn
- Production company: Universal Pictures
- Distributed by: Universal Pictures
- Release date: September 15, 1939
- Running time: 69 minutes
- Country: United States
- Language: English

Two Bright Boys is a 1939 American drama film directed by Joseph Santley, written by Val Burton and Edmund Hartmann, and starring Jackie Cooper, Freddie Bartholomew, Alan Dinehart, Melville Cooper, Dorothy Peterson and J. M. Kerrigan. It was released on September 15, 1939, by Universal Pictures.

== Cast ==
- Jackie Cooper as Rory O'Donnell
- Freddie Bartholomew as David Harrington
- Alan Dinehart as Bill Hallet
- Melville Cooper as Hilary Harrington
- Dorothy Peterson as Kathleen O'Donnell
- J. M. Kerrigan as Mike Casey
- Willard Robertson as Clayton
- Eddie Acuff as Washburn
- Hal K. Dawson as Boswell
- Eddy Waller as Sheriff
- Harry Worth as Maxwell
