= These Thousand Hills =

1959 film by Richard Fleischer

- Theatrical release poster
- Directed by: Richard Fleischer
- Screenplay by: Alfred Hayes
- Based on: These Thousand Hills; 1956 novel by A.B. Guthrie Jr.
- Produced by: David Weisbart
- Starring: Don Murray; Richard Egan; Lee Remick; Patricia Owens; Stuart Whitman; Albert Dekker; Harold J. Stone; Royal Dano; Jean Willes
- Cinematography: Charles G. Clarke
- Edited by: Hugh S. Fowler
- Music by: Leigh Harline
- Distributed by: 20th Century-Fox
- Release date: May 6, 1959
- Running time: 96 minutes
- Country: United States
- Language: English
- Budget: $1.6 million

These Thousand Hills is a 1959 American Western film directed by Richard Fleischer and starring Don Murray, Richard Egan, Lee Remick, Stuart Whitman and Patricia Owens. The screenplay was written by Alfred Hayes. It is based on the novel of the same name by A. B. Guthrie Jr. Filming took place in Sierra de Órganos National Park in the town of Sombrerete, Mexico.

The plot involves a sheltered rancher Lat Evans brought up under the stern gaze of his Bible-thumping father.

== Plot ==
Albert Gallatin "Lat" Evans, an earnest young cowboy determined to better his situation, wins a job with a cattle drive by busting a wild horse. Befriended by cowhand Tom Ping, Lat fantasizes about owning his own ranch and being rich one day, unlike his father, who died "broke, a failure." When the drive reaches a small Wyoming town, the cowboys congregate at the saloon, where Jehu, an unscrupulous rancher, proposes racing one of their horses against his swift steed. Lat accepts the challenge, and is in the lead when his opponent throws a blanket at his face, causing Lat to lose his balance and fall from his horse. Marshal Conrad, the town's upstanding banker, intervenes, however, and declares Lat the winner.

That night, Tom and Lat celebrate with saloon girls Jen and Callie. With their winnings, they decide to leave the cattle drive and hunt wolves for their hides. After bidding his cowhand friends goodbye, Lat, feeling melancholy, gets drunk and visits Callie. When Lat recalls a traumatic incident from his childhood in which his father beat him for being alone with a girl in the woodshed, Callie feels empathy.

Restless and impatient to become successful, Lat asks Conrad for a loan to buy a ranch. After Conrad turns him down, Callie gives Lat her life savings to buy a piece of land, which he then uses as collateral for a loan from Conrad to purchase a herd of cattle. Lat makes Tom a partner in the venture, and after a hard winter, Lat prospers while the other ranchers falter, since he grew hay in the low lands to feed to the cattle in the winter.

As his fortunes improve, Lat begins to shun Callie for Conrad's niece Joyce. When Tom tells Lat that he plans to marry Jen, Lat questions his decision and calls Jen a tramp, causing Tom to angrily renounce their partnership.

One night, while Lat is dining at Conrad's, the banker proposes that he enter politics by running for the school board. Meanwhile, Callie, who has baked a cake for Lat, anxiously awaits his arrival, and when Jehu appears instead, she fights off his crude advances. After dinner, Joyce invites Lat to call on her if he is reputable. Lat goes to Callie's house and informs her that there is no place in his life for her. Soon after, Lat and Joyce are married and start a family. Jehu and Callie become lovers.

When Lat decides to run for U.S. Senator, he is visited by Jehu and rancher Frank Chanault, who use the promise of their votes to coerce him into joining a group of rancher vigilantes on the trail of some horse thieves. The ranchers corner the thieves at their mountain hideout, and after a gun battle, the two surviving rustlers surrender, and Lat is shocked to discover that Tom is one of them. After Tom confesses, he accuses Lat of worshiping the tin god of money. Jehu sentences Tom to hang, and when Lat protests that he be allowed to stand trial, Jehu knocks him unconscious and then hangs Tom.

Riddled with remorse, Lat returns home and Joyce hands him a distress note from Callie. Although Joyce jealously forbids Lat to see Callie, Lat contends that he owes her a debt and proceeds to her house. There, Lat learns from her servant Happy that Jehu has savagely beaten Callie. Outraged, Lat goes in search of Jehu. After finding Jehu at the saloon, the two begin to fight and their brawl spills onto the street as the townsfolk watch in consternation. Pulling a rifle from a saddle, Jehu aims it at Lat just as a gunshot fired by Callie rings out, killing Jehu. Later, at home, Joyce forgives Lat, and when he informs her that he intends to testify at Callie's trial, she graciously gives her consent.

== Cast ==
- Don Murray as Albert Gallatin "Lat" Evans
- Richard Egan as Jehu
- Lee Remick as Callie
- Patricia Owens as Joyce
- Stuart Whitman as Tom Ping
- Albert Dekker as Marshal Conrad
- Harold J. Stone as Ram Butler
- Royal Dano as Ike Carmichael
- Jean Willes as Jen
- Robert Adler as Godwin
- Edmund Cobb
- Steve Darrell as McLean
- George DeNormand as Card-Player
- John Epper as Swede
- Douglas Fowley as Whitey
- Fred Graham as Brice
- A. Cameron Grant as Photographer
- Tom Greenway as Frank Chenault
- Irene James as Dance Hall Girl
- Kenner G. Kemp as Restaurant Patron
- Jess Kirkpatrick as Strain
- Fuzzy Knight as Jacob Smith
- Frank Kreig as Fatty
- Frank Lavier as Little Runner
- Theodore Lehmann as Prospector
- Nelson Leigh as Brother Van
- Barbara Morrison as Miss Fran
- Zon Murray as Vigilante
- Ken Renard as Happy
- Jeffrey Sayre as Croupier
- Cap Somers as Customer
- Tom Steele as Cowhand
- Brick Sullivan as Man on Hurdy-Gurdy Wagon
- Hal Taggart as Restaurant Patron
- Guy Teague as Customer
- Ned Wever as Link Gorham
- Ted White as Cowhand
- Ben Wright as Frenchy

== Reception ==
New York Times reviewer Bosley Crowther was critical: "Under Richard Fleischer's direction, (cast members) dutifully lend their hands to this prettily garbed and scenic sermon, in which no one in Hollywood could deeply believe."
