= Hugh S. Fowler =

American film editor (1912–1975)

- Born: July 24, 1912; Missouri, United States
- Died: August 2, 1975 (aged 63); Manhattan Beach, California, United States
- Occupation: Film editor

Hugh S. Fowler (July 24, 1912 – August 2, 1975) was an American film editor with about 38 feature film credits from 1952 – 1972. He was named after his Grandmother, Mary Ann Stirling, whose family occupied the Stirling Castle in Scotland for 400 years. She married William Kirk Fowler of Auchtermuchty, County Fife, and they emigrated to the U.S. in 1852.

Fowler spent his virtually his entire editing career at Twentieth Century-Fox. After spending years helping other film editors, including Louis Loeffler, Barbara McLean, William H. Reynolds and Robert Simpson, Fowler was promoted to film editor full-time in 1952; his first movie as a film editor was Phone Call from a Stranger, released that year and directed by Jean Negulesco. Although he edited only 38 movies in a 20-year career, all of them Twentieth releases, he edited some of the greatest scenes in the studio's history. Two of them involved the same actress, Marilyn Monroe: her performance of the song "Diamonds Are a Girl's Best Friend" from Gentlemen Prefer Blondes (directed by Howard Hawks - 1953) and her blown-skirt scene in The Seven Year Itch (directed by Billy Wilder-1955).

It was not until eight years after Monroe's death that Fowler won his Oscar, for the movie Patton (1970). His final movie, The Life and Times of Judge Roy Bean (1972), was directed by John Huston. Fowler died in California three years later. Fowler is remembered for editing primarily Twentieth theatrical releases directed by freelancers, including Howard Hawks (Gentlemen Prefer Blondes), Franklin J. Schaffner (Planet of the Apes (1968), Patton), Frank Tashlin (Will Success Spoil Rock Hunter? (1957)) and Billy Wilder (The Seven Year Itch).

== Filmography ==
Editor
Year	Film	Director	Notes	Other notes
1952	Phone Call from a Stranger	Jean Negulesco	First collaboration with Jean Negulesco	
1952	Les Misérables	Lewis Milestone		
1952	Something for the Birds	Robert Wise		
1953	Taxi	Gregory Ratoff		
1953	Gentlemen Prefer Blondes	Howard Hawks		
1955	The Seven Year Itch	Billy Wilder		
1955	Seven Cities of Gold	Robert D. Webb	First collaboration with Robert D. Webb	
1956	On the Threshold of Space	Robert D. Webb	Second collaboration with Robert D. Webb	
1956	The Proud Ones	Robert D. Webb	Third collaboration with Robert D. Webb	
1956	The Last Wagon	Delmer Daves		
1956	Love Me Tender	Robert D. Webb	Fourth collaboration with Robert D. Webb	
1957	The Way to the Gold	Robert D. Webb	Fifth collaboration with Robert D. Webb	
1957	Will Success Spoil Rock Hunter?	Frank Tashlin	First collaboration with Frank Tashlin	
1958	The Gift of Love	Jean Negulesco	Second collaboration with Jean Negulesco	
1958	A Nice Little Bank That Should Be Robbed	Henry Levin		
1958	The Fiend Who Walked the West	Gordon Douglas	First collaboration with Gordon Douglas	
1959	These Thousand Hills	Richard Fleischer		
1959	Say One for Me	Frank Tashlin	Second collaboration with Frank Tashlin	
1959	The Story on Page One	Clifford Odets		
1960	The Lost World	Irwin Allen		
1960	Flaming Star	Don Siegel		
1961	Pirates of Tortuga	Robert D. Webb	Sixth collaboration with Robert D. Webb	
1961	Bachelor Flat	Frank Tashlin	Third collaboration with Frank Tashlin	
1962	Hemingway's Adventures of a Young Man	Martin Ritt		
1963	The List of Adrian Messenger	John Huston	First collaboration with John Huston	Unconfirmed
1963	Twilight of Honor	Boris Sagal		
1965	In Harm's Way	Otto Preminger		
1965	Wild Seed	Brian G. Hutton		
1966	Stagecoach	Gordon Douglas	Second collaboration with Gordon Douglas	
1966	...And Now Miguel	James B. Clark		
1966	Way... Way Out	Gordon Douglas	Third collaboration with Gordon Douglas	
1967	In Like Flint	Gordon Douglas	Fourth collaboration with Gordon Douglas	
1968	Planet of the Apes	Franklin J. Schaffner	First collaboration with Franklin J. Schaffner	
1969	Pendulum	George Schaefer		
1970	Patton	Franklin J. Schaffner	Second collaboration with Franklin J. Schaffner	
1972	Corky	Leonard Horn		
1972	The Life and Times of Judge Roy Bean	John Huston	Second collaboration with John Huston	

Documentaries

Editorial department
Year	Film	Director	Role	Notes
1944	The Negro Soldier	Stuart Heisler	Assistant film cutter	Uncredited

Shorts

Editorial department
Year	Film	Director	Role	Notes
1944	The Negro Soldier	Stuart Heisler	Assistant film cutter	Uncredited

TV series

Editor
Year	Title	Notes
1965	Valentine's Day	1 episode
1969	Then Came Bronson	1 episode
1969	The Survivors	2 episodes

== Award ==
- 1970 Academy Award for Best Film Editing for Patton
- 1970 American Cinema Editors Eddie for Patton
