= Two Thoroughbreds =

- Theatrical release poster
- Directed by: Jack Hively
- Screenplay by: Joseph Fields; Jerome Cady
- Story by: Joseph Fields
- Produced by: Cliff Reid
- Starring: Jimmy Lydon; Joan Leslie; Arthur Hohl; J.M. Kerrigan; Marjorie Main; Selmer Jackson; Spencer Charters
- Cinematography: Frank Redman
- Edited by: Theron Warth
- Music by: Roy Webb
- Production company: RKO Pictures
- Distributed by: RKO Pictures
- Release date: December 8, 1939
- Running time: 62 minutes
- Country: United States
- Language: English

Two Thoroughbreds is a 1939 American drama film directed by Jack Hively, written by Joseph Fields and Jerome Cady, and starring Jimmy Lydon, Joan Leslie, Arthur Hohl, J.M. Kerrigan, Marjorie Main, Selmer Jackson and Spencer Charters. It was released on December 8, 1939, by RKO Pictures.

== Plot ==
When thieves steal Larkspur, a prize thoroughbred brood mare, from the Conway ranch, her foal runs after her and is found by David Carey, an orphan who lives with his heartless aunt Hildegarde and uncle Thad. The lonely David befriends the colt, whom he names Sunset, and convinces his brutal uncle to let him keep the animal, arguing that they can reap a reward from selling the horse. While visiting the Conway ranch in search of advice about raising his horse, David is befriended by Jack Lenihan, the stablemaster, who offers the boy a job in exchange for special food for his colt. When Bill Conway and his daughter Wendy return to the ranch from the East, David realizes that Sunset is their missing foal. As David struggles with his conscience over returning the colt, his cruel uncle harnesses Sunset to a plow and beats the animal. To save the horse, Wendy offers to buy him and then realizes that he is Larkspur's missing colt. Wendy offers David a job as stableboy on the ranch, but David refuses out of guilt and decides to run away. He bids Sunset farewell, but the horse gallops after him and breaks a leg while trying to jump a fence. David begs the Conways to spare the injured horse and, to save Sunset's life, confesses that the animal is their missing horse. Touched by David's confession, Conway convinces the skeptical vet, Dr. Purdy, to use an experimental cast on the horse's broken leg, and after a shaky start, Sunset makes a miraculous recovery.

== Cast ==
- Jimmy Lydon as David Carey
- Joan Leslie as Wendy Conway
- Arthur Hohl as Thaddeus Carey
- J.M. Kerrigan as Jack Lenihan
- Marjorie Main as Hildegarde 'Hildy' Carey
- Selmer Jackson as Bill Conway
- Spencer Charters as Doc Purdy
- Paul Fix as Stablemaster
- Bob Perry as Henchman
- Al Ferguson as Rancher
- Frank Darien as Mr. Beal
- Paul Harvey as Horse Owner
- Crystal Jack the Horse as Sunset
- Rex the Dog as Rajah

== See also ==
- List of films about horses
- List of films about horse racing
