= St. Benny the Dip =

1951 American film by Edgar George Ulmer

- Directed by: Edgar G. Ulmer
- Written by: George Auerbach (story); John Roeburt (writer)
- Produced by: Edward J. Danziger; Harry Lee Danziger
- Starring: Dick Haymes; Nina Foch; Roland Young; Lionel Stander
- Cinematography: Don Malkames
- Music by: Robert W. Stringer
- Production company: Benny Productions
- Distributed by: United Artists
- Release date: August 24, 1951 (United States)
- Running time: 80 minutes
- Country: United States
- Language: English

St. Benny the Dip is a 1951 American musical comedy film directed by Edgar G. Ulmer. The film is also known as Escape If You Can in the United Kingdom.

== Plot ==
Benny, Monk and Matthew are three small-time crooks trying to escape a police dragnet in New York City. After hiding in a church, they disguise themselves as ministers and find shelter in an abandoned Bowery mission. The police mistake them for real ministers sent to restore the soup kitchen, and the men must decide whether to stay, steal the mission money and run or change their lives.

== Cast ==
- Dick Haymes as Benny
- Nina Foch as Linda Kovacs
- Roland Young as Matthew
- Lionel Stander as Monk Williams
- Freddie Bartholomew as Reverend Wilbur
- Oskar Karlweis as Mr. Kovacs
- William A. Lee as Police Sergeant Monahan
- Dick Gordon as Reverend Miles
- Jean Casto as Mrs. Mary Williams
- Eddie Wells as Patrolman McAvoy
- James Bender as House Detective
- Ron & Don Ansell-Smyth as the Twins

== Production ==
The film was originally planned as a Nassour brothers production, with Marlon Brando, Louis Calhern and Roland Young cast in the three leading roles. Brando, following his strong notices for A Streetcar Named Desire, commanded the largest salary ever paid to a newcomer for a film role and was granted final approval of director and script. However, by 1950 the film project had been converted from a straight dramatic subject to a musical comedy and the Danziger brothers became the producers.

Wanda Hendrix, Julie Harris, Geraldine Brooks and Beatrice Pearson were each considered for the lead female role. The inability to cast the role caused a delay in production, forcing Gene Lockhart, who had been cast for a prominent role, to withdraw. Nina Foch was announced as the female lead in May 1950.

The film was shot on location in New York.

== Music ==
The film's score was written and conducted by Robert Stringer and performed by the 110-piece Paris Symphony Orchestra.

Star Dick Haymes, a singer, wrote two of the film's songs.
