= Hollywood Story =

1951 film by William Castle

- Theatrical release poster
- Directed by: William Castle
- Written by: Frederick Brady; Frederick Kohner
- Produced by: Leonard Goldstein
- Starring: Richard Conte; Julia Adams; Richard Egan; Henry Hull; Fred Clark; Jim Backus
- Cinematography: Carl E. Guthrie
- Edited by: Virgil Vogel
- Color process: Black and white
- Production company: Universal Pictures
- Distributed by: Universal Pictures
- Release date: June 1, 1951 (United States)
- Running time: 77 minutes
- Country: United States
- Language: English

Hollywood Story is a 1951 American mystery film directed by William Castle and starring Richard Conte, Julia Adams, Richard Egan, Henry Hull, Fred Clark and Jim Backus.

== Plot ==
New York theatrical producer Larry O'Brien plans to start a film company in Hollywood and purchases a disused studio from the days of silent films. In the studio's office, a famous director was murdered 20 years earlier but the case was never solved. O'Brien becomes fascinated by the subject and decides to produce a film based on the case. He interviews the surviving members of the old studio, hiring many for the film, but soon finds danger himself.

== Cast ==
- Richard Conte as Larry O'Brien
- Julia Adams as Sally Rousseau / Amanda Rousseau
- Richard Egan as Police Lt. Bud Lennox
- Henry Hull as Vincent St. Clair
- Fred Clark as Sam Collyer
- Jim Backus as Mitch Davis
- Houseley Stevenson as John Miller
- Paul Cavanagh as Roland Paul
- Katherline Meskill as Mary
- Louis Lettieri as Jimmy Davis
- Francis X. Bushman as Himself
- Betty Blythe as Herself
- William Farnum as Himself
- Helen Gibson as Herself
- Joel McCrea as Himself (uncredited)

== Production ==
The film was an attempt by Universal Pictures to take advantage of the success of Paramount's Sunset Boulevard, which was released the previous year. The plot is believed to be based on the murder of silent-film director William Desmond Taylor. While Hollywood Story reaches a fictional conclusion, it closely follows the circumstances of the real-life event.

The film features cameo appearances by famous silent-film stars, but those with speaking parts were paid just $55 per day ($682 in 2025 dollars). Others, such as Elmo Lincoln, the first screen Tarzan, appeared as non-speaking extras and were paid only $15 per day ($186 in 2025 dollars).

Hollywood Story was director William Castle's final film of his three-year contract with Universal. He shot many scenes at Charlie Chaplin Studios, built in 1917, to lend the film the air of old Hollywood.

== Reception ==
In a contemporary review for The New York Times, critic Bosley Crowther wrote: "It is easy to see, now, why some pictures which sound promising at the start, on the strength of the ideas behind them, turn out to be dismal flops. 'Hollywood Story' demonstrates it ... [S]criptwriters Frederick Kohner and Fred Brady have cooked up ... a pretty routine assembly of simple who-dunnit cliches into a silly and not very startling disclosure of a motive for a crime. The police must have been awfully lazy back in 1929."
