= Ned Wever =

American actor (1902–1984)

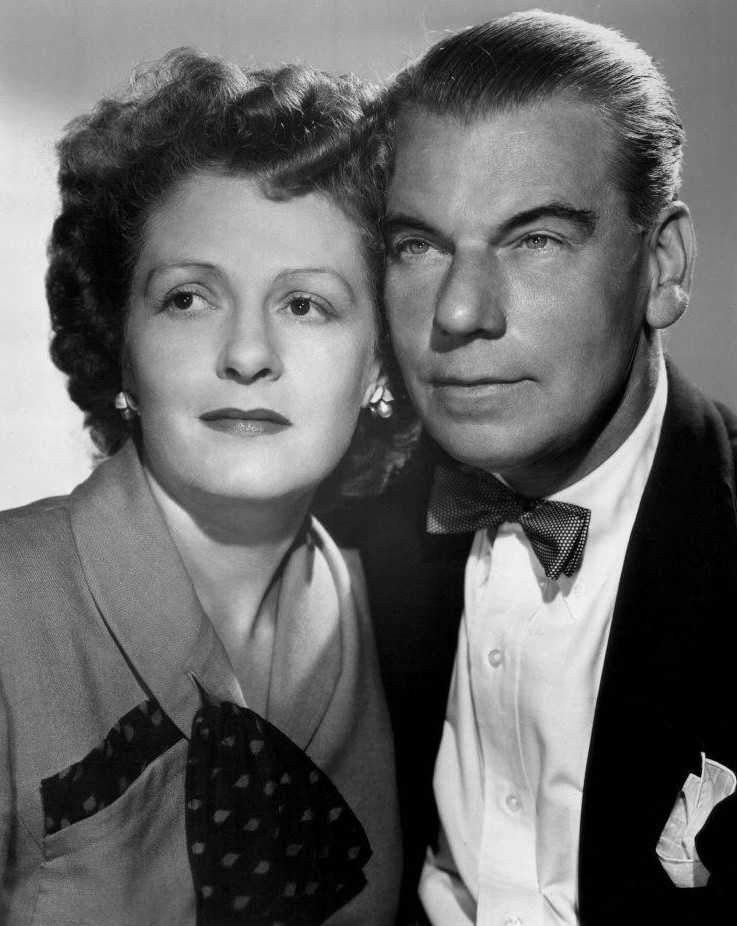
- Florence Freeman (Ellen Brown) and Ned Wever (Dr. Anthony Loring) from Young Widder Brown
- Born: Edward Hooper Wever; April 27, 1902; New York City, U.S.
- Died: May 6, 1984 (aged 82); Laguna Hills, California, U.S.
- Education: Princeton University
- Spouse: Carla Wever
- Children: 2

Ned Wever (born Edward Hooper Weaver; April 27, 1902 – May 6, 1984) was an actor on stage and on old-time radio. Garyn G. Roberts wrote in his book, Dick Tracy and American Culture: Morality and Mythology, Text and Context, "Wever's most famous role was probably that of H.C. McNeile's British detective and adventurer Bulldog Drummond for the program of the same name."

== Early life ==
The son of a New York attorney, Wever was born on April 27, 1902, in New York City. He graduated from the Pawling School and Princeton University, where he was president of the Triangle Club dramatic organization in his senior year and was a member of the staff of The Daily Princetonian newspaper and the Nassau Literary Magazine.

== Radio ==
Wever's roles on radio programs included those shown in the table below.

Program	Role
Betty and Bob	Al Bishop
Big Sister	Jerry Miller
Bulldog Drummond	Bulldog Drummond
Dick Tracy	Dick Tracy
Her Honor, Nancy James	District Attorney
Kate Hopkins, Angel of Mercy	Tom Hopkins
Lady Counsellor	Tony Howard
Little Italy	Nicholas
Lora Lawton	Peter Carver
Two on a Clue	Jeff Spencer
Under Arrest	Captain Jim Scott
Valiant Lady	Colin Kirby
Young Widder Brown	Anthony Loring

He also had leads on True Detective, The True Story Hour, Angel of Mercy and Manhattan Mother and was heard frequently on The Wonder Show, Grand Central Station, Perry Mason and The Cavalcade of America.

== Stage ==
Wever's initial professional stage work came with Stewart Walker's stock theater company in Indianapolis, Indiana. His Broadway credits include Days to Come (1936), The Second Little Show (1930) and The Grab Bag (1924).

== Musical composition ==
In his book, The Great Radio Soap Operas, Jim Cox called Wever "as talented a musician as he was an actor". Cox added, "He composed show tunes for Broadway productions featuring Billy Rose and Ed Wynn." Wever's compositions included "Spellbound", "I Can't Resist You", "Trouble in Paradise" and "Trust in Me".

== Television ==
Wever was credited with more than 70 appearances on television programs, including Alfred Hitchcock Presents, Bonanza, Perry Mason, Get Smart and The George Burns and Gracie Allen Show.

== Selected filmography ==
- Alfred Hitchcock Presents (1957) (Season 2 Episode 22: "The End of Indian Summer") as Saunders
- Alfred Hitchcock Presents (1957) (Season 2 Episode 31: "The Night the World Ended") as Joe
- Alfred Hitchcock Presents (1962) (Season 7 Episode 34: "The Twelve Hour Caper") as Hargis

== Personal life ==
Wever and his wife, Carla, had two daughters, Patricia and Pamela.

== Death ==
Wever died of heart failure May 6, 1984, in a convalescent home in Laguna Hills, California.

== Filmography ==
Year	Title	Role	Notes
1957	Slaughter on Tenth Avenue	Captain Sid Wallace	
1957	The Joker Is Wild	Dr. Pierson	Uncredited
1958	High School Confidential	Police Commissioner Walter Burroughs / Narrator	Uncredited
1958	The Fiend Who Walked the West	Prosecutor Coyne	Uncredited
1958	Ride a Crooked Trail	Attorney Clark	
1958	Some Came Running	Smitty	
1959	The Shaggy Dog	FBI Chief E.P. Hackett	
1959	These Thousand Hills	Link Gorham	Uncredited
1959	Anatomy of a Murder	Dr. Raschid	
1959	The Big Fisherman	Minor Role	Uncredited
1960	One Foot in Hell	Royce City Official	Uncredited
1961	Tammy Tell Me True	Dr. Stach	
