= Slaughter on Tenth Avenue (film) =

1957 film by Arnold Laven

- Theatrical release poster
- Directed by: Arnold Laven
- Screenplay by: Lawrence Roman
- Produced by: Albert Zugsmith
- Starring: Richard Egan; Jan Sterling; Dan Duryea; Julie Adams
- Cinematography: Fred Jackman, Jr.
- Edited by: Russell F. Schoengarth
- Music by: Herschel Burke Gilbert
- Color process: Black and white
- Production company: Universal Pictures
- Distributed by: Universal Pictures
- Release date: September 1, 1957
- Running time: 103 minutes
- Country: United States
- Language: English

Slaughter on Tenth Avenue is a 1957 American film noir crime film directed by Arnold Laven and starring Richard Egan, Jan Sterling, Dan Duryea and Julie Adams.

The film is a story of crime on New York's waterfront. It is based on the non-fiction book The Man Who Rocked the Boat, an autobiography by William Keating, played by Egan in the film. The book chronicles Keating's experiences as an assistant district attorney and as counsel to the New York City Anti-Crime Committee. In the portion of the book depicted in the film, Keating pursued a murder prosecution for a waterfront hit despite widespread corruption that stretched all the way into the district attorney's office.

The title comes from the Richard Rodgers ballet of the same name, which was featured in the 1936 play On Your Toes. The plot line of the movie has no relation to the play, but the composition by Rodgers is indeed heard in the film, in an adaptation by Herschel Burke Gilbert (under the direction of music supervisor Joseph Gershenson) that was praised as "magnificent".

== Plot ==
Thugs working for union boss Al Dahlke ambush and shoot Solly Pitts, an honest man who hires longshoremen on the docks. Solly is wounded and hospitalized, looked after by wife Madge, who trusts Lt. Tony Vosnick to see that justice is done.

District attorney Howard Rysdale turns over the investigation to relative novice Bill Keating. As his marriage to fiancée Daisy Pauly draws near, Keating tries in vain to get longshoremen to speak with him about activities on the docks. An intermediary tries to persuade Keating to collude with Dahlke, who issues vague threats after Bill rejects him.

Witnesses are intimidated and discredited by attorney John Jacob Masters in court, and Bill and Daisy receive an anonymous death threat on their wedding day. Keating goes to the docks for a direct confrontation with Dahlke's men and triggers a near-riot. As the dust settles, the men hear on the radio that Solly's attackers have been found guilty.

== Cast ==
- Richard Egan as William Keating
- Jan Sterling as Madge Pitts
- Dan Duryea as John Jacob Masters
- Julie Adams as Dee
- Walter Matthau as Al Dahlke
- Charles McGraw as Lt. Anthony Vosnick
- Sam Levene as Howard Rysdale
- Mickey Shaughnessy as Solly Pitts
- Harry Bellaver as Benjy Karp
- Nick Dennis as Midget
- Joe Downing as Eddie 'Cockeye' Cook
- Ned Wever as Captain Sid Wallace
- Billy M. Greene as "Monk" Mohler
- John McNamara as Judge
- Amzie Strickland as Mrs. Cavanagh
- Mickey Hargitay as Big John

== See also ==
- List of American films of 1957
