= Fanfare for a Death Scene =

1964 television film

Fanfare for a Death Scene is a 1964 American TV movie directed by Leslie Stevens.

== Plot ==
An American secret agent chases after a formula.

== Cast ==
- Richard Egan
- Dee Hartford
- J.D. Cannon
- Al Hirt
- Viveca Lindfors
- Tina Louise
- Telly Savalas
- Burgess Meredith
- Sandra Warner
- Edward Asner

== Production ==
It was originally directed by Walter Graumann who was sacked and replaced by Stevens.
