= Untamed (1955 film) =

1955 film by Henry King

- Promotional film poster
- Directed by: Henry King
- Screenplay by: Michael Blankfort; Frank Fenton; Talbot Jennings adaptation by William A. Bacher; Talbot Jennings
- Based on: Untamed; 1950 novel by Helga Moray
- Produced by: William A. Bacher; Bert E. Friedlob
- Starring: Tyrone Power; Susan Hayward; Richard Egan
- Narrated by: Susan Hayward
- Cinematography: Leo Tover
- Edited by: Barbara McLean
- Music by: Franz Waxman
- Production company: 20th Century Fox
- Distributed by: 20th Century Fox
- Release date: March 1, 1955
- Running time: 111 minutes
- Country: United States
- Language: English
- Budget: $3,560,000
- Box office: $2.5 million (US rentals)

Untamed is a 1955 American CinemaScope adventure Western film, directed by Henry King and starring: Tyrone Power, Susan Hayward and Richard Egan, with Agnes Moorehead, Rita Moreno and Hope Emerson. It was made by Twentieth Century-Fox in DeLuxe Color. The screenplay was by: William A. Bacher, Michael Blankfort, Frank Fenton and Talbot Jennings from a 1950 novel by Helga Moray. The music score was by Franz Waxman and the cinematography by Leo Tover.

Untamed was the last film edited by Barbara McLean, and her twenty-ninth with Henry King. King called the film "like Cimarron done in South Africa."

== Plot ==
In 1847, Paul van Riebeck, a Boer cavalry commander, travels to Ireland from South Africa to buy horses for his commandos back home. He meets Katie O'Neill, daughter of the man selling the horses. She falls in love, but Paul tells her that he has dedicated himself to the establishment of a new country.

Squire O'Neill dies during the Great Famine that devastates Ireland. Katie marries Shawn Kildare, and they emigrate to South Africa. Their son is born on the sea voyage to Cape Town. They and their friend Aggie O'Toole join a group of settlers on an 800-mile (1,287.5 km) trek to Hoffen Valley, for free farmland. The most dangerous part of the journey is the crossing of Zulu territory; Van Riebeck and his men are supposed to escort them at that point, but they do not show up at the rendezvous. Kurt Hout, son of the trek leader, becomes enamoured with Katie, even though he already has a girlfriend, Julia, who has also come on the trek.

Later, a scout reports that thousands of Zulus are camped ahead of them. They prepare defenses. Simon Hout tries to negotiate with the Zulus, but they attack. Alerted by Tschaka, Paul and his men arrive and save the settlers, but Shawn is among the dead. Told by his friend Kurt that Katie is his woman, Paul tries to stay away, but when Katie tells him that she loves him, he tells her that he loves her too. Feeling betrayed, Kurt attacks Paul with a whip, but is beaten.

Katie and Paul begin building a home, with the help of natives and Aggie. Then, Lieutenant Christian arrives to tell Paul that he must either return to his men or disband the commando. Despite Katie's strong resistance, Paul chooses the former, earning her public declaration of hatred.

Later, Kurt shows up and helps her run the farm and the native workers, still hoping she will fall for him, though he is displeased to find Julia also working for her. Provoked by Julia, Kurt starts to chop down a tree Katie expressly ordered him not to. When Katie tries to stop him, he tries to force himself on her, even though Katie tells him she is pregnant. Lightning from a storm strikes the tree, causing it to fall on Kurt, resulting in the amputation of one of his legs. The storm wrecks the farm. Katie has her second child, whom she names Paul, and starts rebuilding her farm.

An itinerant peddler informs the settlers that next time he will no longer accept Dutch money, only gold, which is present in the nearby mountains. Katie starts trading her meager possessions to the natives for gold. Then one trades her a diamond, one of the largest ever found in South Africa. With the money, she settles into a life of luxury in Cape Town in Paul's refurbished childhood home. Years pass, and Katie is lonely without him.

Finally, Paul's dream is realized: the Dutch Free State is born. Seeking representation in the national assembly for his state, Paul comes to Cape Town, where he is reunited with Katie. They still love each other, but quarrel, and Katie orders Paul to leave.

She loses her fortune, so she takes her sons and Aggie to Colesberg in search of diamonds, despite being warned that outlaws have taken it over. She discovers that Kurt is the embittered leader of the outlaws. The same day, Paul shows up with his men to retake Kolesburg for the government. Kurt prepares an ambush, but Paul outwits him and captures all of his men. Kurt takes Paul's son hostage and gets ready to shoot an unarmed Paul, but Tschaka kills him with his spear. Paul slips a wedding ring on Katie's finger and they set out for Hoffen.

== Cast ==
- Tyrone Power as Paul van Riebeck
- Susan Hayward as Katie O'Neill
- Richard Egan as Kurt Hout
- Agnes Moorehead as Aggie O'Toole
- Henry O'Neill as Squire O'Neill
- John Justin as Shawn Kildare
- Rita Moreno as Julia
- Hope Emerson as Maria DeGroot
- Brad Dexter as Lt. Christian
- Paul Thompson as Tschaka

== Production ==
The film was based on a novel, by Helga Moray, who was born in South Africa in 1917, and was married to director Tay Garnett; the story is based on the adventures of Moray's Irish grandmother in South Africa. Producer William Bacher became aware of it in 1945, when it was only a 17-page story with the working title Katie Called Katje. Bacher read it and optioned the film rights, helping Moray shape the novel and contributing funds to enable her to finish it. Bacher tried to interest Fox, MGM and Paramount in the project, but all the studios turned it down, worried about the cost.

The novel was published in 1950. The Washington Post called it a "trifle indigestible" although "ready for filming." William Bacher announced he wanted Glenn Ford to star in the film version.

No movie resulted. Bacher teamed with Bert Freidlob and in 1953 managed to sell the project to Fox, who were looking for projects to make that would exploit their new CinemaScope technique. Talbot Jennings was hired to write the script. Freidlob wanted Jean Simmons, Susan Hayward or Eleanor Parker for the female lead and Gregory Peck or Tyrone Power for the male lead. He planned to shoot 90% of the film on location in South Africa and 10% in Europe.

Eventually Henry King was signed to direct, and Susan Hayward to star.

King and Hayward left for Africa to film background footage in March 1954. In April he went to Ireland for some additional filming.

Filming took place in Valley of a Thousand Hills.

The unit returned to Hollywood and filming did not resume in the studio until mid July.

Untamed was Tyrone Power's last film at Fox after 18 years. Victor Mature was meant to play the third lead, but refused and was put on suspension; Richard Egan played the part instead.

== Reception ==
In The New York Times, Bosley Crowther wrote of the film:

Thanks to a recent advertisement for Twentieth Century-Fox's Untamed, the big CinemaScope outdoor drama that rolled into the Roxy yesterday, we learned that a team of oxen was largely responsible for this film. Without these collaborators, the ad said, it couldn't have been done.The contribution of the oxen, according to the ad, was to haul the CinemaScope cameras into the African wilds for the shooting of some of the more magnificent and spectacular action scenes. These are scenes in vivid color of a horde of wild Zulus attacking a wagon train of Dutch, French, Irish and other immigrants trekking into the Dark Continent to establish a new Boer settlement. At least, we suppose these are the scenes for which the oxen brought up the cameras. If so, they deserve commendation, for these scenes are the best in the film. But we have a suspicion that those oxen also had something to do with the writing of the script—and maybe even directing some sequences. For the script and, indeed, the direction manifest a very heavy hand—or hoof...

Only Agnes Moorehead as an Irish nanny sneers and snorts at the entire goings-on.

== See also ==
- List of American films of 1955
