= Richard Egan (actor) =

American actor (1921–1987)

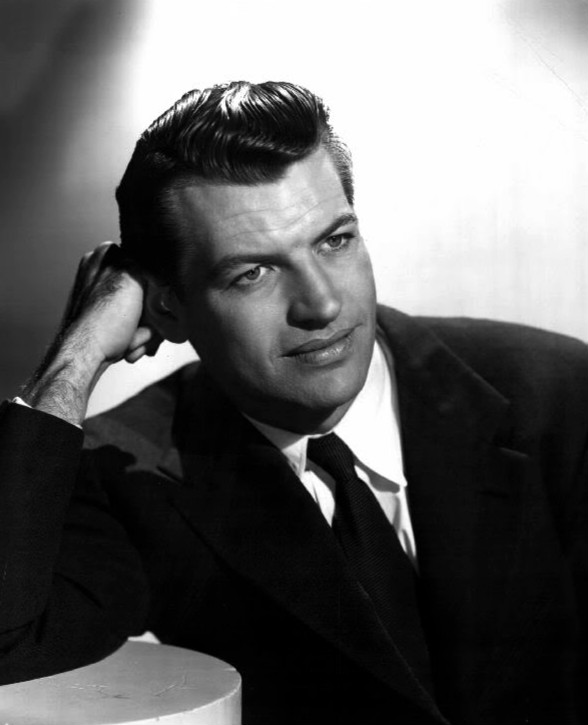
- Egan in 1949
- Born: July 29, 1921; San Francisco, California, U.S.
- Died: July 20, 1987 (aged 65); Santa Monica, California, U.S.
- Resting place: Holy Cross Cemetery
- Other names: Richard Eagan
- Education: University of San Francisco; Stanford University
- Occupation: Actor
- Years active: 1949–1987
- Spouse: Patricia Hardy (m. 1958)

Richard Egan (July 29, 1921 – July 20, 1987) was an American actor. After beginning his career in 1949, he subsequently won a Golden Globe Award for his performances in the films The Glory Brigade (1953) and The Kid from Left Field (1953). He went on to star in many films such as Underwater! (1955), Seven Cities of Gold (1955), The Revolt of Mamie Stover (1956), Love Me Tender (1956), Tension at Table Rock (1956), A Summer Place (1959), Esther and the King (1960) and The 300 Spartans (1962).

== Early life ==
Egan was born and raised in San Francisco, California. Of Irish descent, he graduated from St. Ignatius College Preparatory. He won a public-speaking competition in 1938 that helped fire his interest in performing. He was supported by his brother who was a priest.

Egan studied drama while pursuing a BA at the University of San Francisco. In 1943 he left to serve in the United States Army as a judo and knife fighting instructor during World War II. He spent a year in the Philippines and was discharged with the rank of captain.

"The war had given me time to think", he later said, "and to decide what I really wanted to do. I think I had always been an actor in my mind, but now I was going to be one in public, too. Right out in front of everybody."

When Egan returned, he went back to school to earn a master's degree in theater history from Stanford University, with the help of the G.I. Bill. From there, he went on to teach public speaking at Northwestern University. While at Northwestern, he appeared in thirty campus stage productions and was eventually spotted by a Warner Bros talent scout, Solly Bioano, who encouraged him to try Hollywood.

== Career ==
Egan had a series of unsuccessful screen tests. He eventually got a bit role in the 1949 Hollywood film The Story of Molly X, at Universal. He had small roles in The Good Humor Man (1950) starring Jack Carson, at Columbia; The Damned Don't Cry (1950) (as Joan Crawford's husband) and Return of the Frontiersman (1950) with Gordon MacRae and Rory Calhoun, both at Warner Bros.; and The Killer That Stalked New York (1950) with Evelyn Keyes, at Columbia.

=== Universal ===
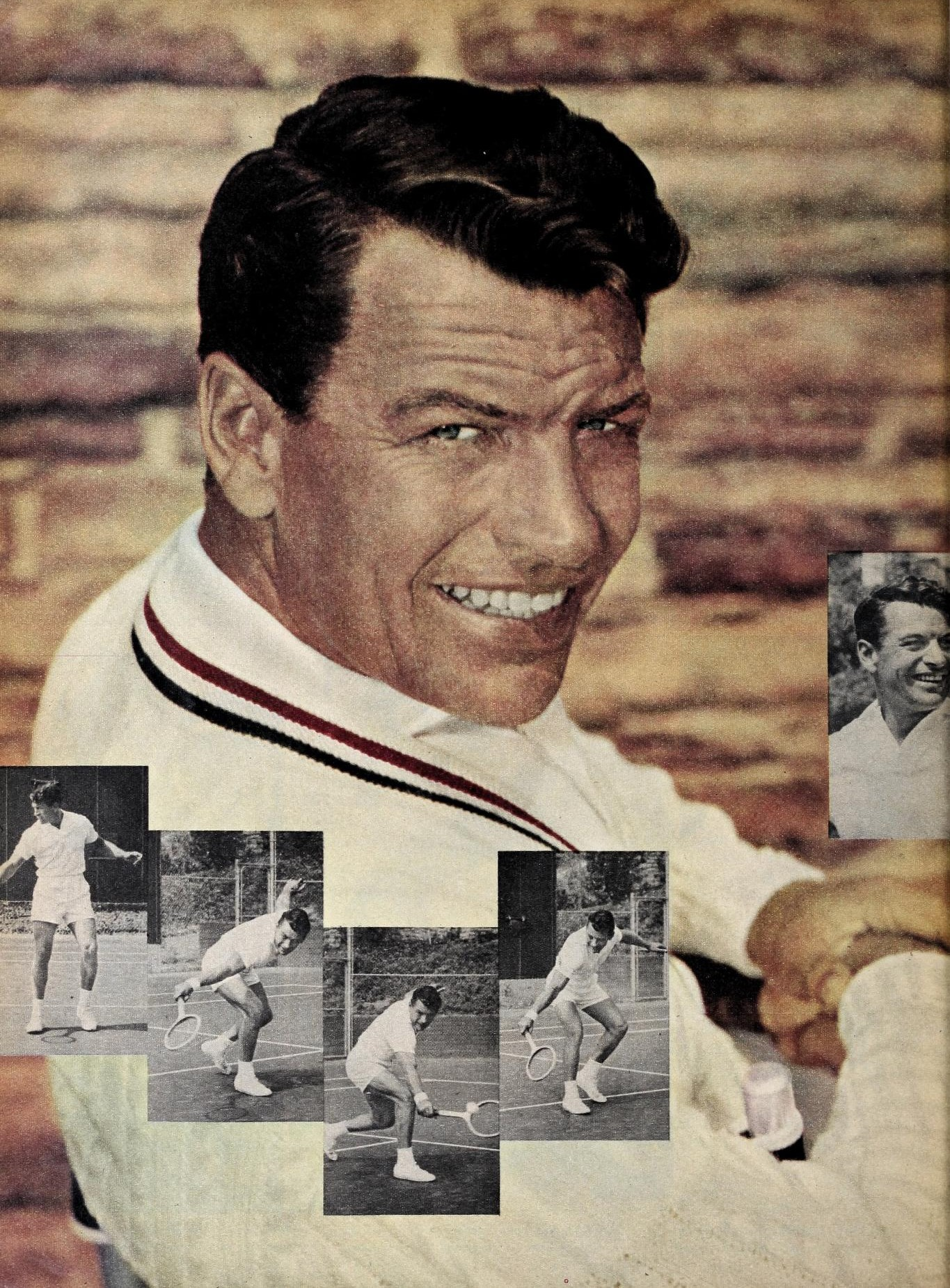
Richard Egan playing tennis (1956)

In June 1950 Egan signed a contract with Universal. There he had supporting roles in Wyoming Mail (1950), Undercover Girl (1950), Kansas Raiders (1950); Highway 301 (1950); Bright Victory (1951); and Up Front (1951). Egan later described these roles as saying things like "Charlie, go outside! The horses are ready."

He was billed third on the screen (but sixth on the posters) as a police investigator in Hollywood Story (1951), directed by William Castle, and billed fourth in the swashbuckler The Golden Horde (1951).

Egan was also in Flame of Araby (1951) and The Battle at Apache Pass (1952).

Edward Small cast him in a support role in Cripple Creek (1952). Egan went to RKO for One Minute to Zero (1952) and MGM for The Devil Makes Three (1952), shot in Germany. He did "Let George Do It" on TV for Hollywood Opening Night (1952).

Egan had support roles in RKO's Blackbeard the Pirate (1952) starring Robert Newton and Split Second (1953).

Egan supported Victor Mature in The Glory Brigade (1953), a war movie at 20th Century Fox, then had a small part in The Kid from Left Field (1953). He did "Malaya Incident" and "Double Bet" for Ford Television Theatre(1953).

Egan's career received a boost when a casting director, according to Egan, said "Take off your shirt!" and then cast him in a small role in Demetrius and the Gladiators (1954), as a gladiator who fights Victor Mature.

This led to Egan's first leading role, in Edward Small's Wicked Woman (1953). On TV he did "Go Away a Winner" for Schlitz Playhouse (1954), then had another lead in a low budget movie, Gog (1954), produced by Ivan Tors.

Small used him as a leading man again in Khyber Patrol (1954). He was used by RKO to costar with Jane Russell in Underwater! (1955). It led to Hedda Hopper declaring Egan to be one of the most promising actors of 1954.

=== 20th Century Fox ===
In July 1954, Darryl F. Zanuck of Fox offered Egan a seven-year contract at two films a year.

Egan was billed third in Fox's Untamed (1955), supporting Tyrone Power and Susan Hayward, taking a role that Victor Mature turned down. He was billed second in Fox's Violent Saturday (1955), directed by Richard Fleischer, starring Mature. The film was a success.

Fox announced him for Women in the Woods with Sheree North and Rita Moreno but it was not made.

=== Stardom ===
Egan was top-billed in Fox's Seven Cities of Gold (1955), an adventure film. He had the star part in The View from Pompey's Head (1955), which was well received.

He starred in The Revolt of Mamie Stover (1956), opposite Jane Russell again (playing a part turned down by Marilyn Monroe).

Egan went to RKO for a Western, Tension at Table Rock (1956). He followed this with another Western at Fox, Love Me Tender (1956), where Egan was top-billed. It was a success at the box office. However this was attributed to the third-billed actor who played Egan's character's brother, Elvis Presley, whose first film it was. The success of the film saw Egan voted as the 13th biggest star in the US according to an exhibitor poll.

Egan signed a contract with Universal where he made Slaughter on Tenth Avenue (1957), and Voice in the Mirror (1958).

Back at Fox, Egan starred with Robert Mitchum and Robert Wagner in The Hunters (1958), and Don Murray in These Thousand Hills (1959).

Egan had another hit with A Summer Place (1959) at Warner Bros. which co-starred Sandra Dee and Troy Donahue.

In 1960, Egan appeared with Jane Wyman and Hayley Mills in Disney's Pollyanna. He co-starred with Joan Collins in Fox's Esther and the King (1960).

Egan was Rod Serling's first choice to narrate The Twilight Zone, because of his distinctive voice. However, contractual issues got in the way, and Serling himself narrated instead, rather than select any actor other than his first choice.

Egan played the lead role of Leonidas I in Fox's The 300 Spartans (1962).

=== Television ===
Egan starred in the NBC Western dramatic series, Empire, which aired from September 25, 1962 to December 31, 1963. In the shortened second season, the program was renamed Redigo after Egan's character, ranch manager Jim Redigo.

When the series ended Egan starred in a TV thriller Fanfare for a Death Scene (1964). He did "Massacre at Fort Phil Kearney" for Theatre of Stars (1966) and the TV movie Valley of Mystery (1967).

In 1966, when asked about his lack of film roles, he said, "They want anti-heroes now, and it's just not for me. I'm just not right for that. It's much easier to be cynical than to make a positive statement, to set up a man only to knock him down, than to show convincingly a man who successfully sticks by his beliefs. We desperately need something to give strength and fortitude to the lost. I want to be a part of that. Part of the solution. And if I can't . . . well . . . I'm sure not interested in becoming part of the problem instead."

Egan had the lead in some low-budget films, Chubasco (1968) and The Destructors (1969) and starred opposite Lana Turner in The Big Cube (1969).

Egan had the lead in Moonfire (1970) and co-starred with Barbara Stanwyck in The House That Would Not Die.

He had the lead in the TV movie The Day of the Wolves (1971) and a support part in Left Hand of Gemini (1972) and Shootout in a One Dog Town (1974).

=== Later roles ===
Egan began guest starring on TV series such as The Streets of San Francisco, Matt Helm, The Quest, and Police Story.

He had a lead in Throw Out the Anchor! (1974).

In 1974, he returned to the stage and for the next eight years toured extensively in stage productions starting with No Hard Feelings. (1974 until 1976). In 1976 he appeared in Time Out For Ginger, 1976 to 1979 in Hanky Panky, 1979 to 1981 in Broken Up and 1982 in I Ought To Be In Pictures.

Egan had the lead in a TV movie, Mission to Glory: A True Story (1977), and co starred with Robert Mitchum in The Amsterdam Kill (1977) and starred in the low-budget Western The Sweet Creek County War (1979).

Egan joined the political soap opera, Capitol, as a recurring character in 1982.

== Personal life and death ==
Egan met his wife, Patricia Hardy, in 1956.

The couple married on June 7, 1958, in San Francisco and remained together until Egan's death in July 1987. The couple had four daughters — Patricia, Kathleen, Colleen, and Maureen, a writer and music video director — as well as a son, Richard Egan Jr., who founded Vagrant Records.

Egan died in Santa Monica, California, on July 20, 1987, of prostate cancer at age 65. He was remembered in The New York Times as being, "known for his roles as a tough leading man in action films and Westerns." He is interred at Holy Cross Cemetery in Culver City, California.

== Partial filmography ==
- The Story of Molly X (1949) – Police Detective (uncredited)
- The Good Humor Man (1950) – Officer Daley
- The Damned Don't Cry! (1950) – Roy Whitehead
- Return of the Frontiersman (1950) – Cowhand (uncredited)
- The Killer That Stalked New York (1950) – Treasury Agent Owney (uncredited)
- Wyoming Mail (1950) – Beale
- Undercover Girl (1950) – Jess Faylen
- Kansas Raiders (1950) – First Lieutenant
- Highway 301 (1950) – Herbie Brooks
- Up Front (1951) – Capa
- Bright Victory (1951) – Sgt. John Masterson
- Hollywood Story (1951) – Police Lt. Bud Lennox
- The Golden Horde (1951) – Gill
- Flame of Araby (1951) – Captain Fezil
- The Battle at Apache Pass (1952) – Sgt. Reuben Bernard
- Cripple Creek (1952) – Strap Galland alias Gillis
- One Minute to Zero (1952) – Capt. Ralston
- The Devil Makes Three (1952) – Lt. Parker
- Blackbeard the Pirate (1952) – Briggs
- Split Second (1953) – Dr. Neal Garven
- The Glory Brigade (1953) – Sgt. Johnson
- The Kid from Left Field (1953) – Billy Lorant
- Wicked Woman (1953) – Matt Bannister
- Gog (1954) – Dr. David Sheppard
- Demetrius and the Gladiators (1954) – Dardanius
- Khyber Patrol (1954) – Capt. Kyle Cameron
- Underwater! (1955) – Johnny Gray
- Untamed (1955) – Kurt Hout
- Violent Saturday (1955) – Boyd Fairchild
- Seven Cities of Gold (1955) – Jose Mendoza
- The View from Pompey's Head (1955) – Anson 'Sonny' Page
- The Revolt of Mamie Stover (1956) – Jim Blair
- Tension at Table Rock (1956) – Wes Tancred
- Love Me Tender (1956) – Vance Reno
- Slaughter on Tenth Avenue (1957) – William "Bill" Keating
- Voice in the Mirror (1958) – Jim Burton
- The Hunters (1958) – Colonel Dutch Imil
- These Thousand Hills (1959) – Jehu
- A Summer Place (1959) – Ken Jorgenson
- Pollyanna (1960) – Dr. Edmond Chilton
- Esther and the King (1960) – King Ahasuerus
- The 300 Spartans (1962) – King Leonidas
- Chubasco (1967) – Sebastian
- The Destructors (1968) – Dan Street
- The Big Cube (1969) – Frederick Lansdale
- Downhill Racer (1969) – Extra in bar scene (uncredited)
- Moonfire (1970) – Sam Blue
- The House That Would Not Die (1970, TV movie) – Pat McDougal
- The Day of the Wolves (1971) – Pete Anderson
- Throw Out the Anchor! (1974) – Jonathon
- Mission to Glory: A True Story (1977) – Father Eusibio Francisco Kino
- The Amsterdam Kill (1977) – Ridgeway
- The Sweet Creek County War (1979) – Judd Firman
