= Barbara McLean =

American film editor (1903–1996)

- Photograph by Howard Jean from Vogue (1952).
- Born: Barbara Pollut; November 16, 1903; Palisades Park, New Jersey
- Died: March 28, 1996 (aged 92); Newport Beach, California
- Spouses: J. Gordon McLean (m. 1924, divorced); Robert D. Webb (m. 1951; died 1990)
- Awards: Best Editing 1944 Wilson

Barbara "Bobby" McLean (November 16, 1903 – March 28, 1996) was an American film editor with 62 film credits.

In the period Darryl F. Zanuck was dominant at the 20th Century Fox Studio, from the 1930s through the 1960s, McLean was the studio's most prominent editor and ultimately the head of its editing department. She won the Academy Award for Best Film Editing for the film Wilson (1944). She was nominated for the same award another six occasions, including All About Eve (1950). Her total of seven nominations for Best Editing Oscar was not surpassed until 2012 by Michael Kahn.

She had an extensive collaboration with the director Henry King over 29 films, including Twelve O'Clock High (1949). Her impact was summarized by Adrian Dannatt in 1996 who wrote that McLean was "a revered editor who perhaps single-handedly established women as vital creative figures in an otherwise patriarchal industry."

== Early life and career ==
McLean was born in Palisades Park, New Jersey; she was the daughter of Charles Pollut, who ran a film laboratory. As a child she worked on release prints from the adjacent studio of E.K. Lincoln in Grantwood, who was an early producer of films. No doubt the early experience in processing of film was helpful to McLean when she became an assistant film editor, but McLean later commented that her musical training as a child also was very important.

In 1924, she married J. Gordon McLean, who was a film projectionist and later, a cameraman. After marrying, the couple moved to Los Angeles, California. McLean found work as an assistant editor at First National Studio. She subsequently joined Twentieth Century Pictures, where initially, she assisted the editor Alan McNeil. In 1933, she received her first editing credit for Gallant Lady; her work on Les Misérables (directed by Richard Boleslawski, 1935) was nominated for the Academy Award for Film Editing.

== 20th Century Fox ==
In 1935, 20th Century Pictures merged with the Fox Film Corporation to form 20th Century Fox. Darryl F. Zanuck was the head of the merged studio, and McLean became the chief editor under his sponsorship. John Gallagher has written that "Studio chief Darryl F. Zanuck was himself a brilliant editor and maintained the best editorial department in Hollywood."

McLean retained this position until her retirement in 1969. McLean had more authority over the editing of the studio's films than is typical for contemporary film editors; as Lizzie Francke described it: "McLean worked during a period when the editor was often left to his or her own devices in the cutting room. The pressures of production turn-over during the hey-day of the studio system often meant that the director could not be around to supervise since they were on to their next production."

Darryl Zanuck not only trusted McLean with the editing of 20th Century Fox's more important projects, he depended on her judgment in many other areas of filmmaking, including casting and production. In 1940, a Los Angeles Times story commented that "Barbara McLean, one of Hollywood's three women film editors, can make stars — or leave their faces on the cutting room floor."

The films McLean edited at 20th Century Fox included The Rains Came (1939), the only time she worked with director Clarence Brown, for which she was nominated for an Academy Award for editing. She was credited with working on John Ford's Tobacco Road (1941), and George Cukor's, Winged Victory (1944). In 1950–1951, McLean edited three of Joseph L. Mankiewicz's films, including All About Eve, for which she received her final Academy Award nomination. Her nomination was among the 14 nominations for the film.

In the 1940s, McLean and her first husband divorced. In 1951 she married Robert D. Webb, who had been working as King's assistant director.

== Collaboration with Henry King ==
"For all her focus on keeping the narrative moving, McLean's editing could dazzle if called for. In A Bell for Adano (1945), she took material director Henry King shot on the return of the Italian POWs to their village and put it together with such a pure sense of emotion that when she cut at exactly the right moment to King's overhead shot of the prisoners and villagers coming together in the square, the cut was more heart-stopping than conventional close-ups would have been."
— Tom Stempel

McLean began her long association with the director Henry King on the films The Country Doctor (1936) and Lloyd's of London (1936); she received her second nomination for an Academy Award for the latter film. McLean received three further nominations for editing films directed by King: for Alexander's Ragtime Band (1938), The Song of Bernadette (1943), and Wilson (1944). On Wilson, as Tom Stempel has described, McLean "had to cut down the enormous amount of footage from the 1912 Democratic convention into a workable sequence, and she condensed several bill-signing sequences into montage sequences." Wilson was the only film for which McLean won an Academy Award for Film Editing.

It may be that King and McLean's greatest accomplishment was the film Twelve O'Clock High (1949); Sean Axmaker has written "Twelve O'Clock High was one of the early and arguably the greatest of the Hollywood films to examine the pressures of command and the psychological toll of making life and death decisions for men they come to know and care for." While the film was nominated for the Academy Award for Best Picture, neither King nor McLean received personal Academy Award recognition for their work in making that film. Nearly half of the 62 films crediting McLean as editor were directed by Henry King.

== Later years ==
McLean edited Viva Zapata! (1952), one of Elia Kazan's films, and Michael Curtiz's The Egyptian (1954). She also edited the first released movie produced in CinemaScope, Henry Koster's The Robe (1953). McLean's last editing credit was for Untamed (1955). She was co-producer of Seven Cities of Gold (1955). Her later work was primarily as a supervisor and administrative. McLean was instrumental in the careers of other film editors such as Hugh S. Fowler, William H. Reynolds, and Robert Simpson.

McLean retired from 20th Century Fox in 1969, apparently because of her husband's poor health. She received the inaugural American Cinema Editors Career Achievement Award in 1988. She died in Newport Beach, California in 1996.

== Partial filmography ==
Editor
Year	Film	Director	Notes	Other notes	More notes
1929	Coquette	Sam Taylor			Uncredited
1933	Gallant Lady	Gregory La Cava	First collaboration with Gregory La Cava		
1934	The House of Rothschild	Alfred L. Werker; Sidney Lanfield	First collaboration with Sidney Lanfield		
1934	The Affairs of Cellini	Gregory La Cava	Second collaboration with Gregory La Cava		
1934	The Mighty Barnum	Walter Lang	First collaboration with Walter Lang		
1935	Clive of India	Richard Boleslawski	First collaboration with Richard Boleslawski		
1935	Les Misérables	Richard Boleslawski	Second collaboration with Richard Boleslawski		
1935	Metropolitan	Richard Boleslawski	Third collaboration with Richard Boleslawski		
1935	Professional Soldier	Tay Garnett			
1936	The Country Doctor	Henry King	First collaboration with Henry King		
1936	Sins of Man	Otto Brower; Gregory Ratoff			
1936	Sing, Baby, Sing	Sidney Lanfield	Second collaboration with Sidney Lanfield		
1936	Lloyd's of London	Henry King	Second collaboration with Henry King		
1937	Seventh Heaven	Henry King	Third collaboration with Henry King		
1937	Love Under Fire	George Marshall			
1938	In Old Chicago	Henry King	Fourth collaboration with Henry King		
1938	The Baroness and the Butler	Walter Lang	Second collaboration with Walter Lang		
1938	Alexander's Ragtime Band	Henry King	Fifth collaboration with Henry King		
1938	Suez	Allan Dwan			
1939	Jesse James	Henry King	Sixth collaboration with Henry King		
1939	Stanley and Livingstone	Henry King; Otto Brower	Seventh collaboration with Henry King		
1939	The Rains Came	Clarence Brown			
1940	Little Old New York	Henry King	Eighth collaboration with Henry King		
1940	Maryland	Henry King	Ninth collaboration with Henry King		
1940	Down Argentine Way	Irving Cummings	First collaboration with Irving Cummings		
1940	Chad Hanna	Henry King	Tenth collaboration with Henry King		
1941	Tobacco Road	John Ford			
1941	A Yank in the R.A.F.	Henry King	Eleventh collaboration with Henry King		
1941	Remember the Day	Henry King	Twelfth collaboration with Henry King		
1942	Rings on Her Fingers	Rouben Mamoulian			
1942	The Magnificent Dope	Walter Lang	Third collaboration with Walter Lang		
1942	The Black Swan	Henry King	Thirteenth collaboration with Henry King		
1943	Hello, Frisco, Hello	H. Bruce Humberstone	First collaboration with H. Bruce Humberstone		
1943	The Song of Bernadette	Henry King	Fourteenth collaboration with Henry King		
1944	Wilson	Henry King	Fifteenth collaboration with Henry King		
1944	Winged Victory	George Cukor			
1945	A Bell for Adano	Henry King	Sixteenth collaboration with Henry King		
1945	The Dolly Sisters	Irving Cummings	Second collaboration with Irving Cummings		
1946	Three Little Girls in Blue	H. Bruce Humberstone	Second collaboration with H. Bruce Humberstone		
1946	Margie	Henry King	Seventeenth collaboration with Henry King		
1947	Nightmare Alley	Edmund Goulding			
1947	Captain from Castile	Henry King	Eighteenth collaboration with Henry King		
1948	Deep Waters	Henry King	Nineteenth collaboration with Henry King		
1948	When My Baby Smiles at Me	Walter Lang	Fourth collaboration with Walter Lang		
1949	Prince of Foxes	Henry King	Twentieth collaboration with Henry King		
1949	Twelve O'Clock High	Henry King	Twenty-first collaboration with Henry King		
1950	The Gunfighter	Henry King	Twenty-second collaboration with Henry King		
1950	No Way Out	Joseph L. Mankiewicz	First collaboration with Joseph L. Mankiewicz		
1950	All About Eve	Joseph L. Mankiewicz	Second collaboration with Joseph L. Mankiewicz		
1951	I'd Climb the Highest Mountain	Henry King	Twenty-third collaboration with Henry King		
1951	Follow the Sun	Sidney Lanfield	Third collaboration with Sidney Lanfield		
1951	David and Bathsheba	Henry King	Twenty-fourth collaboration with Henry King		
1951	People Will Talk	Joseph L. Mankiewicz	Third collaboration with Joseph L. Mankiewicz		
1952	Viva Zapata!	Elia Kazan			
1952	Wait till the Sun Shines, Nellie	Henry King	Twenty-fifth collaboration with Henry King		
1952	Lure of the Wilderness	Jean Negulesco	First collaboration with Jean Negulesco		
1952	O. Henry's Full House	Henry King	Twenty-sixth collaboration with Henry King	"The Gift of the Magi" segment	Uncredited
1952	The Snows of Kilimanjaro	Henry King	Twenty-seventh collaboration with Henry King		
1953	Niagara	Henry Hathaway			
1953	The Desert Rats	Robert Wise			
1953	The Robe	Henry Koster			
1953	King of the Khyber Rifles	Henry King	Twenty-eighth collaboration with Henry King		
1954	The Egyptian	Michael Curtiz			
1955	Untamed	Henry King	Twenty-ninth collaboration with Henry King		

Producer
Year	Film	Director	Credit	Notes
1955	Seven Cities of Gold	Robert D. Webb	Producer	First collaboration with Robert D. Webb
1956	On the Threshold of Space	Robert D. Webb	Associate producer	Second collaboration with Robert D. Webb

== See also ==
- List of film director and editor collaborations
