= Naval Academy (film) =

1941 film by Erle C. Kenton

- Directed by: Erle C. Kenton
- Screenplay by: David Silverstein; Gordon Rigby
- Story by: Robert James Cosgriff
- Produced by: Wallace MacDonald
- Starring: Freddie Bartholomew; Jimmy Lydon; Billy Cook; Pierre Watkin; Warren Ashe; Jimmy Butler
- Cinematography: John Stumar
- Edited by: William Lyon
- Production company: Columbia Pictures
- Distributed by: Columbia Pictures
- Release date: June 5, 1941
- Running time: 67 minutes
- Country: United States
- Language: English

Naval Academy is a 1941 American action film directed by Erle C. Kenton and written by David Silverstein and Gordon Rigby. The film stars Freddie Bartholomew, Jimmy Lydon, Billy Cook, Pierre Watkin, Warren Ashe and Jimmy Butler. The film was released on June 5, 1941, by Columbia Pictures.

== Cast ==
- Freddie Bartholomew as Steve Kendall
- Jimmy Lydon as Tommy Blake
- Billy Cook as Dick Brewster
- Pierre Watkin as Capt. Davis
- Warren Ashe as Lt. Brackett
- Jimmy Butler as Matt Cooper
- Douglas Scott as Jimmy Henderson
- Warren McCollum as Cadet
- Calvin Ellison as Cadet
- Joe Brown Jr. as Bill Foster
- David Durand as Fred Bailey
- Tommy Bupp as Joey Martin
- John Dilson as John Frazier
- William Blees as CPO Caldwell
