= Patricia Hardy =

American actress (1931–2011)

- Patricia Hardy in Don't Knock the Rock 1956
- Born: December 23, 1931; Brooklyn, New York, U.S.
- Died: August 20, 2011 (aged 79); Los Angeles, California, U.S.
- Burial place: Holy Cross Cemetery
- Spouse: Richard Egan (m. 1958; died 1987)

Patricia Hardy (December 23, 1931 – August 20, 2011) was an American television and film actress whose career was most active during the 1950s. She was the wife of actor Richard Egan.

== Biography ==
The third daughter of parents of Irish descent, James J. and Mary (née Toal) Hardy, Patricia Hardy was born and raised in Brooklyn, New York. She won several beauty pageants during her early years, including Miss Brooklyn, Miss Coney Island and Miss New York Press Photographer. She was a model for Walter Thornton and appeared on the cover of Look Magazine. She began her entertainment career in New York City, performing at the Copacabana nightclub with such well-known performers as Danny Thomas and Jimmy Durante.

She met her future husband, actor Richard Egan, in 1956. The couple married on June 7, 1958, in San Francisco and remained together until Egan's death in July 1987. The couple had four daughters - Patricia, Kathleen, Colleen, and Maureen Egan, a writer and music video director, as well as a son, Richard Egan Jr., who founded Vagrant Records.

Hardy moved from New York to Los Angeles to pursue a film and television career. She was cast in several 1950s television episodes including two appearances on Perry Mason: as defendant Claire Olger in the 1958 episode, "The Case of the Haunted Husband," and as Jo Ann Blanchard in the 1959 episode, "The Case of the Startled Stallion." She also appeared in the series' State Trooper, The Loretta Young Show, Lassie and Schlitz Playhouse, in which she co-starred in an episode with James Dean. Her film credits included Girls in the Night in 1953 and Don't Knock the Rock in 1957.

== Death ==
Hardy died of colon cancer at her home in Brentwood, Los Angeles, California on August 20, 2011, aged 79. She was buried at Holy Cross Cemetery, Culver City, California, alongside her husband, at Section AA, Tier 37, Grave 139
