= Seven Cities of Gold (film) =

1955 film by Robert D. Webb

- Directed by: Robert D. Webb
- Screenplay by: Richard L. Breen
- Based on: The Nine Days of Father Serra; 1951 novel by Isabelle Gibson Ziegler
- Produced by: Barbara McLean; Robert D. Webb
- Starring: Richard Egan; Anthony Quinn; Michael Rennie; Jeffrey Hunter; Rita Moreno
- Cinematography: Lucien Ballard
- Edited by: Hugh S. Fowler
- Music by: Hugo Friedhofer
- Production company: 20th Century Fox
- Distributed by: 20th Century Fox
- Release date: September 8, 1955
- Running time: 103 minutes
- Country: United States
- Language: English
- Budget: $1.5 million

Seven Cities of Gold is a 1955 American historical adventure film directed by Robert D. Webb and starring Richard Egan, Anthony Quinn and Michael Rennie, filmed in DeLuxe Color and CinemaScope. It tells the story of the eighteenth-century Franciscan priest, Father Junípero Serra and the founding of the first missions in what is now California. The screenplay is based on the 1951 novel The Nine Days of Father Serra by Isabelle Gibson Ziegler. The tag line of the film was "This is the story of the making...and the forging...of California...when men chose gold or God...the sword or the Cross".

== Plot ==
In 1769, the expedition of Captain Gaspar de Portolà to California is in search of fabled cities of gold. Its religious advisor, peace-loving missionary Father Junípero Serra, wishes to establish good relations with the local natives and to build a string of missions, beginning at San Diego Bay. He is unexpectedly aided when Portola's prideful second in command, Lt. Jose Mendoza, saves the life of Matuwir, the grandson of the local chief. But when a supply ship fails to appear and the expedition prepares to return to Mexico a failure, Mendoza betrays Matuwir's sister Ula, whom he has seduced, resulting in her accidental death by a fall from a cliff. Threatened with annihilation by Matuwir's warriors when both Portola and Father Serra refuse to turn him over, Mendoza prevents war by surrendering himself to Matuwir for torture and execution. As the Spaniards begin to leave, the supply ship appears in the bay as if by a miracle.

== Cast ==
- Richard Egan as Lt. José Mendoza
- Anthony Quinn as Capt. Gaspar de Portolà
- Michael Rennie as Father Junipero Serra
- Jeffrey Hunter as Matuwir
- Rita Moreno as Ula
- Eduardo Noriega as Sergeant
- Leslie Bradley as Galves
- John Doucette as Juan Coronel
- Julio Villarreal as Pilot Vila
- Jack Mower as Father (uncredited)

== Production ==
The film was based on the book The Nine Days of Father Sierra which was published in 1951. The New York Times called it a "brief, tender, impressive novel." Film rights were bought by 20th Century Fox who in June 1952 announced Charles Brackett would produce and John C Higgins would write the script.

In April 1953 Fox announced the film would be made in CinemaScope and that Richard Breen was working on the script.

In October 1954, it was reported Joseph Petracca was writing the script and that the film would star James Mason.

By January 1955 the film was titled Seven Cities of Gold. Brackett was out as producer, replaced by the husband and wife team of Barbara McLean, normally an editor, and Robert D. Webb, who would direct. The stars would be Richard Egan, Michael Rennie, Rita Moreno and Cameron Mitchell. Jeffrey Hunter was cast as a Native American on the basis of his success as a Native American in White Feather, which he had just made for Webb. Mitchell was eventually replaced by Anthony Quinn.

Filming began 15 March 1955 and included location filming in Mexico. It finished by 20 June.

== Release ==
The film premiered in San Diego.

== See also ==
- List of American films of 1955
