= William Wintersole =

American actor (1931–2019)

- Born: July 30, 1931; Portsmouth, Ohio, U.S.
- Died: November 5, 2019 (aged 88); Los Angeles, California, U.S.
- Occupation: Actor
- Years active: 1964–2011
- Children: 2

William Wintersole (July 30, 1931 – November 5, 2019) was an American actor who appeared on The Young and the Restless for over 20 years as Mitchell Sherman, as well as on General Hospital as Ted Ballantine.

A character actor, Wintersole also appeared in television series, including I Dream of Jeannie, Kojak, Little House on the Prairie, Quincy, M.E., Bonanza, Star Trek: The Original Series, Mission: Impossible; and The Fugitive.

Wintersole died from cancer at his home in Los Angeles, California at the age of 88 on November 5, 2019.

== Filmography ==
Year	Title	Role	Notes
1964	The Outer Limits	Prof. Andrew Whitsett	
1965	Profiles in Courage	Matw	
1965	Rawhide	Dr. Sturdivant	
1965-1966	Peyton Place	Mr. West / Mr. Sanford	
1966	Blue Light	Von Clausitz	
1966	Seconds	Dr. in Operating Room	
1966	Jericho	Lieutenant Stennes	
1966	The Fugitive	Billy - Pilot / Desk Clerk	
1967	Valley of the Dolls	Tony's Doctor	Uncredited
1968	How to Save a Marriage and Ruin Your Life	Sanatorium Attendant	Uncredited
1970	Moonfire	Larry Benjamin	
1972	Squares	A Patrolman	
1975	The Hindenburg	Secretary	Uncredited
1976	W. C. Fields and Me	I.R.S. Man	Uncredited
1976	Leadbelly	Sheriff Gibbons	
1978	Coma	Lab Technician	
