= The House That Would Not Die =

1970 American supernatural TV movie

- 2019 home media release art by Kino Lorber
- Genre: Horror
- Based on: Ammie Come Home by Barbara Michaels
- Written by: Henry Farrell
- Directed by: John Llewellyn Moxey
- Starring: Barbara Stanwyck; Richard Egan; Michael Anderson Jr. Kitty Winn
- Music by: Laurence Rosenthal
- Country of origin: United States
- Original language: English

Production
- Producer: Aaron Spelling
- Cinematography: Fleet Southcott
- Editor: Art Seid
- Running time: 74 minutes
- Production company: Aaron Spelling Productions

Original release
- Network: ABC
- Release: October 27, 1970

The House That Would Not Die (Note: The House That Would Not Die is the official title as shown in the credits, though some newspapers and other sources list the shortened title, The House That Wouldn't Die.) is a 1970 American made-for-television supernatural horror film starring Barbara Stanwyck (in her television film debut), Richard Egan, Michael Anderson Jr. and Kitty Winn. It premiered as the ABC Movie of the Week on October 27, 1970.

Henry Farrell, author of What Ever Happened to Baby Jane?, wrote the teleplay based on the 1968 novel Ammie Come Home by Barbara Michaels, one of several pseudonyms used by author Barbara Mertz.

== Plot ==
Ruth Bennett has inherited an old house in Gettysburg, Pennsylvania in the Amish country, and left her career behind as a secretary at the U.S. Department of Agriculture. She moves into the home with her niece, a young woman named Sara Dunning. The house was built during the Revolutionary era and is said to be haunted by the spirits of its original inhabitants who are disinclined towards hospitality, among them the war-general, Douglas Campbell, who was suspected of being involved with British enemies, and his daughter Amanda "Ammie", who disappeared after eloping with her boyfriend Anthony.

Ruth and Sara soon meet Pat McDougal, a local professor who lives next-door. While Ruth and Sara entertain a small gathering, including Pat and one of his students, Stan, one of the guests proposes that they hold a séance in the house. Later that night, Ruth has a bizarre nightmare in which Sara approaches her in the garden, only to grow inexplicably terrified and flee in the other direction. When Ruth awakens, she finds a frightened Sara downstairs, having found an historic portrait of Anthony impaled on a firepoker in front of the fireplace.

Pat and several guests, including medium Sylvia Wall, arrive at the home for the séance. In the kitchen, Pat aggressively forces himself on Ruth, which frightens her. During the séance, Sara begins to scream, and the painting of Anthonyfalls from the mantel. That night, Ruth is awoken by Sara in another hysterical state, during which she attacks and attempts to strangle her. When Ruth consults Pat about Sara's behavior, he suspects Sarah is suffering from schizophrenia. Sara returns in the midst of their conversation, and initially appears normal, but quickly becomes transfixed in front of the fireplace, and begins screaming for help before suddenly losing consciousness. Pat suggests Sara be taken to a psychiatric hospital, but Stan objects, and reveals that, during the séance the day before, he witnessed the face of another woman on Sara's body.

Stan suspects Sara is experiencing spirit possession, which also may explain Pat's uncharacteristic behavior toward Ruth in the kitchen. Later, outside the house, Ruth, Pat, and Stan hear a man repeatedly calling, "Ammie! Come home!" Inside, they find Sara again in a distressed state. Stan begins to investigate diaries and other artifacts in the home's attic, and soon experiences supernatural incidents himself. Upon further research of historical records, the group deduce that General Campbell murdered Anthony and Ammie the night they attempted to elope, and that their spirits have been taking possession of Pat and Sara's bodies.

The group consult Sylvia to hold another séance to exorcise the spirits from Sara and Pat, which results in violent poltergeist activity that sends Sylvia fleeing in terror. While further exploring the house, Stan finds a boarded passageway in the basement. Shortly after, Pat becomes momentarily possessed by Anthony, and Sara, by Ammie. Seeking to stop the events once and for all, Ruth, Pat, Sara, and Stan convene again at the house, and break through the basement wall. Inside, they find a dirt-walled room with a shovel. Stan begins to dig, and soon recovers human bones, along with an old firepoker—the murder weapon the General used to kill Ammie and Anthony before burying them in the basement. Moments later, Pat becomes possessed by the General, and attempts to attack the possessed Sara, but he stops when Ammie—speaking through Sara's body—tells him his crime has been uncovered. Now, with the truth revealed, the spirits leave Pat and Sara's respective bodies.

== Cast ==
- Barbara Stanwyck as Ruth Bennett
- Richard Egan as Pat McDougal
- Michael Anderson Jr. as Stan Whitman
- Kitty Winn as Sara Dunning
- Doreen Lang as Sylvia Wall
- Mabel Albertson as Mrs. McDougal

== Production ==
The teleplay for The House That Would Not Die, by Henry Farrell, was adapted from the novel Ammie, Come Home by Barbara Michaels. It was filmed at Paramount Studios in Hollywood, California.

== Release ==
Coordinated for Halloween programming, the film was released as an ABC Movie of the Week on October 27, 1970.

=== Critical response ===
The Times Colonist noted that the film "might have been a production failure were it not for the convincing emoting of Miss Stanwyck." The Billings Gazette noted in their review that: "This is a haunted house tale dished up for Halloween, and though it may not prove scary, it will hold your interest."

=== Home media ===
In January 2019, Kino Lorber released the film on DVD and Blu-ray featuring a 2K restoration from the original film elements.

== Sources ==
- McKenna, Michael (2013). The ABC Movie of the Week: Big Movies for the Small Screen. Lanham, Maryland: Scarecrow Press. ISBN 978-0-810-89157-9.
- Sherman, Fraser A. (2015). Cyborgs, Santa Claus and Satan: Science Fiction, Fantasy and Horror Films Made for Television. Jefferson, North Carolina: McFarland. ISBN 978-1-476-61101-3.
