= Gallant Lady (1934 film) =

1934 film by Gregory La Cava

- Theatrical release poster
- Directed by: Gregory La Cava
- Screenplay by: Sam Mintz
- Story by: Douglas Z. Doty; Gilbert Emery
- Produced by: Darryl F. Zanuck
- Starring: Ann Harding; Clive Brook; Otto Kruger
- Cinematography: J. Peverell Marley
- Edited by: Barbara McLean
- Music by: Alfred Newman
- Production company: Twentieth Century Pictures
- Distributed by: United Artists
- Release date: January 5, 1934
- Running time: 84 minutes
- Country: United States
- Language: English

Gallant Lady is a 1934 American pre-Code drama film directed by Gregory La Cava and starring Ann Harding, Clive Brook and Otto Kruger. It was a production of Darryl F. Zanuck's independent company Twentieth Century Pictures. The film was released on January 5, 1934, by United Artists. It was a commercial and critical success on its release. It was remade in 1938 as Always Goodbye with Barbara Stanwyck and Herbert Marshall.

== Plot ==
In New York Sally Wyndham watches in distress as her aviator fiancee is killed in a plane crash. Pregnant and dazed, she wanders the streets and encounters Dan Pritchard, a doctor who served a two year prison sentence for committing what he considered a mercy killing on one of his patients. With his support, she gives up her child for adoption to a couple of his friends. Her quest for stability and happiness later takes her to Italy and Paris. She eventually comes to hope that the child's adoptive mother will return her son to her.

== Cast ==
- Ann Harding as Sally Wyndham
- Clive Brook as Dan Pritchard
- Otto Kruger as Phillip Lawrence
- Tullio Carminati as Count Mario Carniri
- Dickie Moore as Deedy Lawrence
- Janet Beecher as Maria Sherwood
- Betty Lawford as Cynthia Haddon
- Scotty Beckett as Deedy - Age 2 (uncredited)

== Bibliography ==
- Solomon, Aubrey. The Fox Film Corporation, 1915-1935: A History and Filmography. McFarland, 2011.
- Tims, Hilton. Emotion Pictures: The 'Women's Picture', 1930-55. Columbus, 1987.
