= Listen, Darling =

1938 film by Edwin L. Marin

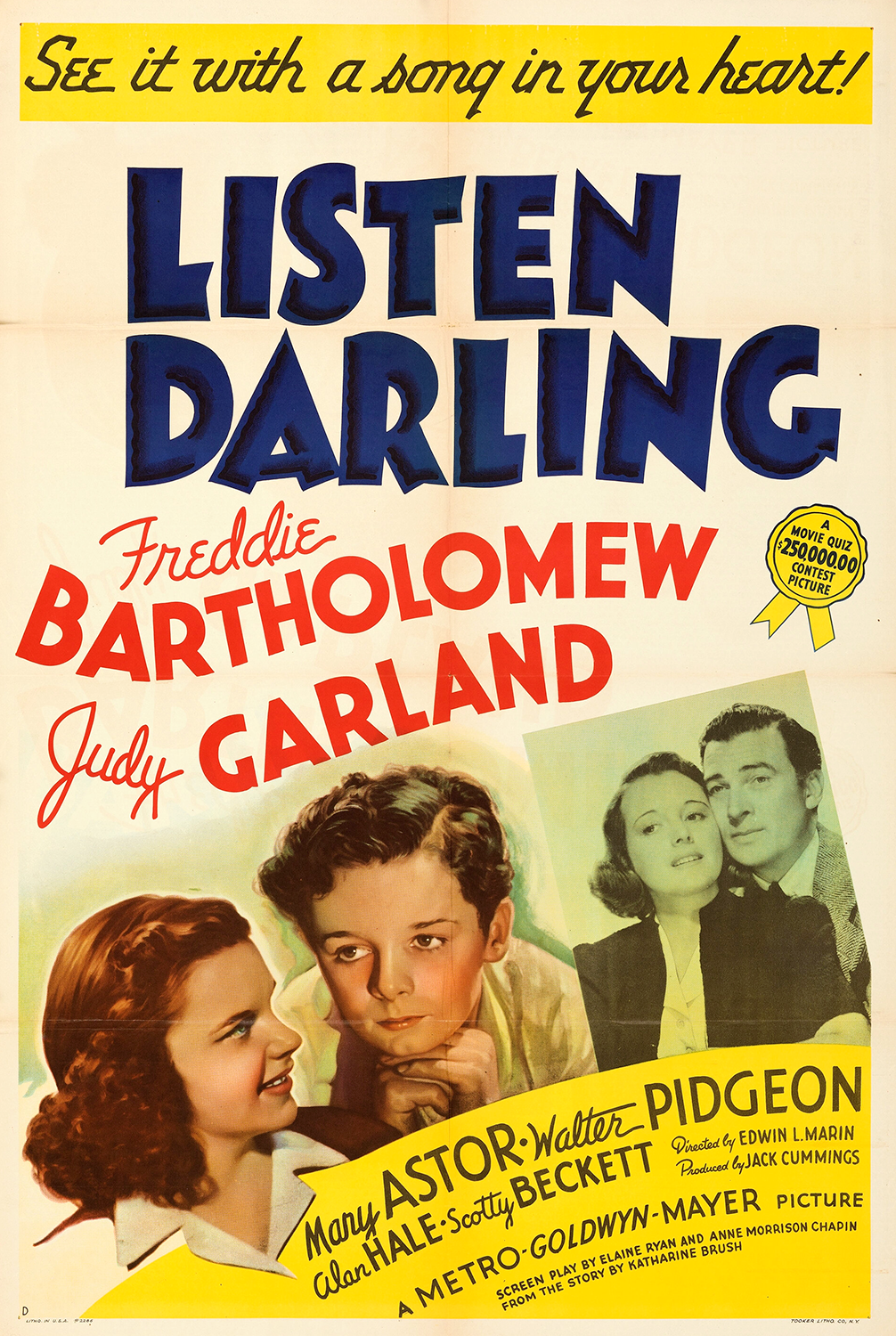
- Theatrical release poster
- Directed by: Edwin L. Marin
- Written by: Katharine Brush (story); Anne Morrison Chapin; Elaine Ryan; Noel Langley (uncredited)
- Produced by: Jack Cummings
- Starring: Judy Garland; Freddie Bartholomew; Mary Astor; Walter Pidgeon
- Cinematography: Charles Lawton Jr. Lester White
- Edited by: Blanche Sewell
- Music by: William Axt
- Distributed by: Metro-Goldwyn-Mayer
- Release date: October 21, 1938
- Running time: 75 minutes
- Country: United States
- Language: English
- Budget: $566,000
- Box office: $583,000

Listen, Darling is a 1938 American musical comedy film starring Judy Garland, Freddie Bartholomew, Mary Astor, and Walter Pidgeon. It is best known as being the film in which Judy Garland sings "Zing! Went the Strings of My Heart", which later became one of her standards.

== Plot ==
Pinky Wingate (Judy Garland) is worried about her widowed mother, Dottie (Mary Astor), who is pursuing a loveless relationship with the town's banker, knowing he can help her fund her children's lives. To help her realize this, Pinky and her friend Buzz (Freddie Bartholomew) "kidnap" Dottie and her younger brother Billie (Scotty Beckett), taking them on a road trip to get away from the banker. While they do this, they meet two men, Richard Thurlow (Walter Pidgeon) and J.J Slattery (Alan Hale), who they think would be nice husbands for her mother. Her mother falls in love with Richard Thurlow (Walter Pidgeon) and they go home.

== Cast ==
- Judy Garland as "Pinkie" Wingate
- Freddie Bartholomew as Herbert "Buzz" Mitchell
- Mary Astor as Dorothy "Dottie" Wingate
- Walter Pidgeon as Richard Thurlow
- Alan Hale as J.J. Slattery
- Scotty Beckett as Billie Wingate
- Barnett Parker as Abercrombie
- Gene Lockhart as Arthur Drubbs
- Charley Grapewin as Uncle Joe Higgins

== Release ==
Listen, Darling was released by Metro-Goldwyn-Mayer on October 21, 1938. According to MGM records, the film earned $381,000 in the US and Canada and $202,000 elsewhere, resulting in a loss of $17,000. Initially, the film was released as home media on VHS in 1992 by MGM/UA Home Video, on LaserDisc in 1995 by MGM/UA Home Video along with Thoroughbreds Don't Cry and on DVD in 2012 by Warner Archive.
