= Cadets on Parade =

1942 film

- Directed by: Lew Landers
- Screenplay by: Howard J. Green
- Story by: Frank Fenton; Martha Barnett
- Produced by: Wallace MacDonald
- Starring: Freddie Bartholomew; Jimmy Lydon; Joseph Crehan; Raymond Hatton; Minna Gombell; Robert Warwick
- Cinematography: Philip Tannura
- Edited by: Richard Fantl
- Production company: Columbia Pictures
- Distributed by: Columbia Pictures
- Release date: January 22, 1942
- Running time: 66 minutes
- Country: United States
- Language: English

Cadets on Parade is a 1942 American drama film directed by Lew Landers and written by Howard J. Green. The film stars Freddie Bartholomew, Jimmy Lydon, Joseph Crehan, Raymond Hatton, Minna Gombell and Robert Warwick. The film was released on January 22, 1942, by Columbia Pictures.

== Plot ==
Due to not being good at sports and not adapting to the student life, Austin Shannon decides to run away from military school. The school offers a 1000 dollar reward for Austin's return. Austin meets newsboy Joe Novak, who doesn't seem to care about the reward money, and they both become buddies, Austin educates Joe, while Joe teaches him how to box and play other sports.

== Cast ==
- Freddie Bartholomew as Austin Shannon
- Jimmy Lydon as Joe Novak
- Joseph Crehan as Jeff Shannon
- Raymond Hatton as Gus Novak
- Minna Gombell as Della
- Robert Warwick as Colonel Metcalfe
- Kenneth MacDonald as Dr. Nesbitt
- Charles Lind as Jerry
- Billy Lechner as Paul
- William Blees as Edwards
- Emory Parnell as Inspector Kennedy
- Stanley Brown as Lt. Wilson
- James Millican as Lt. Thomas
- Lloyd Whitlock as Paul's father
- Jack Gardner as Photographer
- Chuck Hamilton as Cop
