= Moonfire (film) =

- Film poster
- Directed by: Michael Parkhurst
- Written by: Michael Parkhurst
- Produced by: Michael Parkhurst
- Starring: Richard Egan; Charles Napier; Sonny Liston; Dayton Lummis; Joaquín Martínez
- Cinematography: Sven Walnum
- Edited by: John Winfield
- Music by: Norman Anderson
- Production company: Hollywood Continental
- Release date: 1970
- Running time: 107 minutes
- Country: United States
- Language: English

Moonfire is a 1970 action adventure film written, produced, and directed by Michael Parkhurst. It was photographed in the De Luxe colour system.

It starred Richard Egan, Charles Napier, and former World Heavyweight Champion boxer Sonny Liston. It portrays truckers battling a Nazi hiding in Mexico. There is a subplot about the disappearance of a reclusive billionaire.

== Cast ==
- Richard Egan – Sam Blue
- Charles Napier – Robert W. Morgan
- Sonny Liston – The Farmer
- Dayton Lummis – Fuentes
- Joaquín Martínez – Lazaro (as Joaquin Martinez)
- Richard Bull – Hawkins
- Rodolfo Hoyos, Jr. – Pedro (as Rudolfo Hoyos)
- Jose Gonzales-Gonzales – Jesus (as Jose Gonzales Gonzales)
- William Wintersole – Larry Benjamin
- Patricia Magrini – Benjamin's Secretary
- Duncan Inches – Benjamin's Assistant #1
- Jack Dickson – Benjamin's Assistant #2
- Rod Bird – Messenger
- Sandy Rosenthal – Ira Morris
- Ira Morris – Message Reader in Truck Stop
- Alfred G. Bosnos – Truck Broker (as Al Bosnos)
- Sam Dermengian – A.C.C. Inspector
- Robert Panizza – Tourist in Cadillac
- Malcolm Alexander – Jesse James
- Monica Marie – Ice Cream Girl
- Sarah Dobbs – Motel Girl
- Roger Galloway – Multiple Roles

== See also ==
- List of American films of 1970
