= Harry C. Bradley (actor) =

American actor (1869–1947)

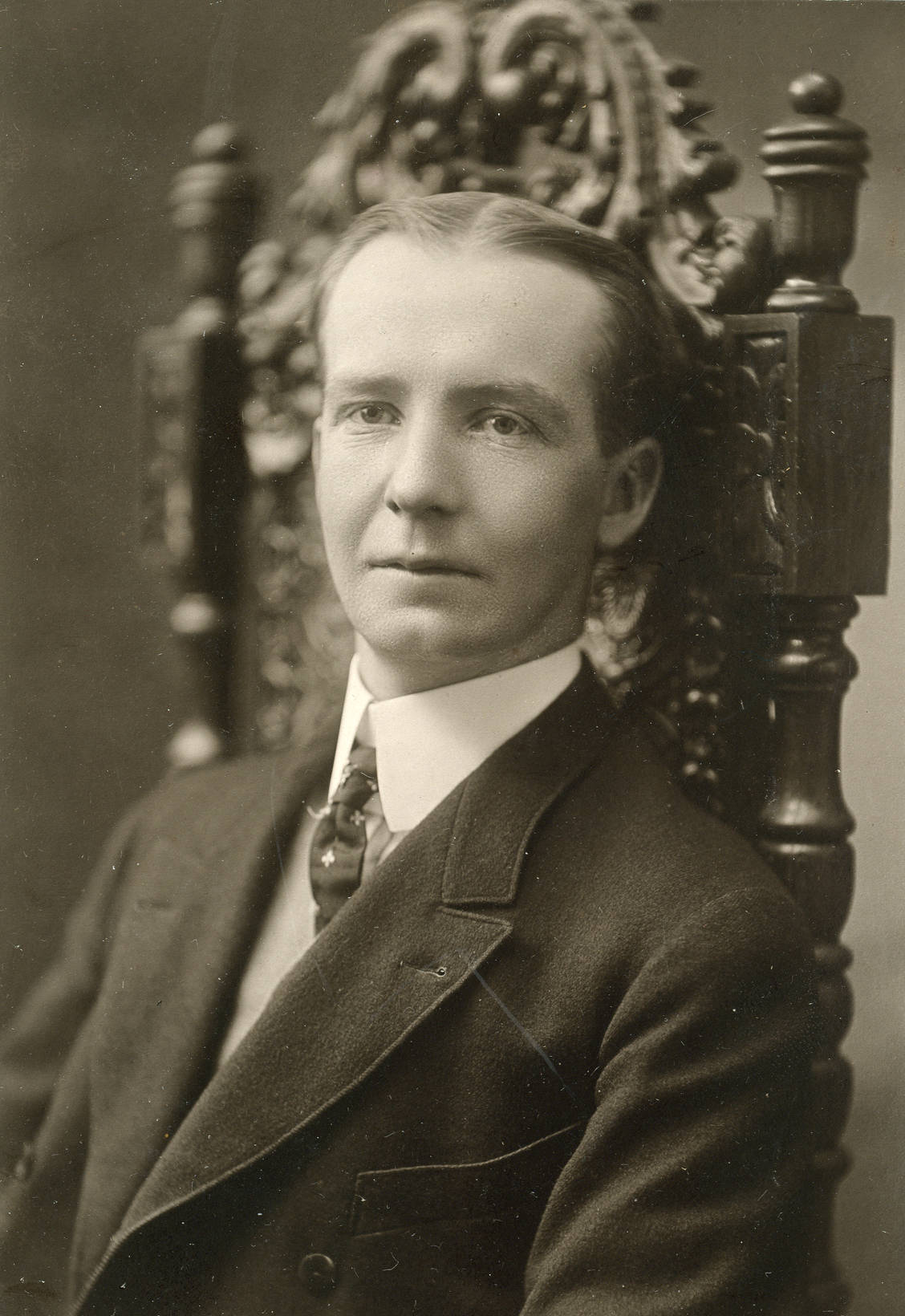
- Born: April 15, 1869; San Francisco, California, U.S.
- Died: October 18, 1947 (aged 78); Hollywood, California, U.S.
- Occupation: Actor
- Years active: 1930–1946
- Spouse(s): Lurelle Lansing Waters; 1894–1906; div. Lorena Atwood; 1926–1947; her death

Harry C. Bradley (born Harry Charles Bradley Cockrill; April 15, 1869 – October 18, 1947) was an American film actor. He appeared in more than 200 films between 1930 and 1946.

== Early life and career ==
Bradley was born and raised in San Francisco. His father Theodore Cockrill was San Francisco's Chief of Police.

Before he ever stepped in front of a movie camera, Bradley had amassed about 2 decades' worth of Broadway stage credits, most notably in the original production of Anne Nichols' Abie's Irish Rose, in which Bradley portrayed Father Whelan in all 2,327 performances.

== Personal life and death ==
Bradley was married at least twice, both times to fellow stage performers.

In 1894, he married Lurelle Lansing Waters. She divorced Bradley on grounds of desertion in 1906, but continued to appear alongside him onstage under her maiden name for at least another two years.

From 1926 until her death in June 1947, Bradley was married to the stage actress and singer Lorena Atwood. On October 18, scarcely four months later, Bradley suffered a fatal heart attack in Hollywood.

== Selected filmography ==
- Roadhouse Nights (1930) - Hotel Desk Clerk (uncredited)
- The Smiling Lieutenant (1931) - Count Von Halden (uncredited)
- The Dark Horse (1932) - Blue Ribbon Man (uncredited)
- Beauty Parlor (1932) - Henry Mason
- Skyscraper Souls (1932) - Johnson, Dwight's Secretary (uncredited)
- American Madness (1932) - Sampson (uncredited)
- 70,000 Witnesses (1932) - Train Conductor (uncredited)
- Prosperity (1932) - Man Whose Pants Need Mending (uncredited)
- The Kid from Spain (1932) - Man in Line at Mexican Border (uncredited)
- If I Had a Million (1932) - Uniformed Bank Guard (uncredited)
- Silver Dollar (1932) - Messenger (uncredited)
- The Billion Dollar Scandal (1933) - Minister (uncredited)
- Employees' Entrance (1933) - Employee Who Refuses Paycut (uncredited)
- Parachute Jumper (1933) - Man in Society for Prohibition Enforcement Office (uncredited)
- Luxury Liner (1933) - Ship's Tailor (uncredited)
- Ladies They Talk About (1933) - Attendee at Revival Meeting (uncredited)
- Mystery of the Wax Museum (1933) - Reporter (uncredited)
- Grand Slam (1933) - Bridge Match Referee (uncredited)
- Girl Missing (1933) - Station Master (uncredited)
- The Little Giant (1933) - Harry S. Winter (uncredited)
- Central Airport (1933) - Doctor (uncredited)
- The Working Man (1933) - Reeves Co. Board Member (uncredited)
- I Have Lived (1933) - Clergyman (uncredited)
- Melody Cruise (1933) - Ship Passenger (uncredited)
- I Love That Man (1933) - Prison Chaplain (uncredited)
- The Stranger's Return (1933) - Dr. Rizzell (uncredited)
- This Day and Age (1933) - Mr. Smith (uncredited)
- Lady for a Day (1933) - Lloyd - Hotel Mail Clerk (uncredited)
- Bureau of Missing Persons (1933) - Mr. Newberry (uncredited)
- The Prizefighter and the Lady (1933) - Bar Patron #4 (uncredited)
- Sitting Pretty (1933) - Set Designer (uncredited)
- Dancing Lady (1933) - Pinky's Pal (uncredited)
- Lone Cowboy (1933) - First Station Agent (uncredited)
- Lady Killer (1933) - Man with Purse (uncredited)
- Convention City (1933) - Graham
- The Big Shakedown (1934) - Third Drug Store Proprietor (uncredited)
- Cross Country Cruise (1934) - First Dodd's Salesman (uncredited)
- Caravan (1934) - Priest (uncredited)
- Mandalay (1934) - Henry P. Warren (uncredited)
- As the Earth Turns (1934) - Elder (uncredited)
- It Happened One Night (1934) - Henderson (uncredited)
- Heat Lightning (1934) - 'Popsy' - a Businessman
- Men in White (1934) - Minister (uncredited)
- House of Mystery (1934) - Prof. Horatio Potter
- City Limits (1934) - Dr. Stafford
- The Line-Up (1934) - Mr. Hamilton (uncredited)
- The Last Gentleman (1934) - Professor Schumaker (uncredited)
- Sadie McKee (1934) - Dr. Taylor - with Dr. Briggs (uncredited)
- Change of Heart (1934) - Graduation Speaker (uncredited)
- Hell Bent for Love (1934) - Professor
- The Merry Frinks (1934) - Dr. Shinliver
- Now I'll Tell (1934) - Judge Farth (uncredited)
- Call It Luck (1934) - Herman Gideon (uncredited)
- Fifteen Wives (1934) - Davis - Hotel Manager
- Beyond the Law (1934) - Professor Bennett
- Our Daily Bread (1934) - Professor (uncredited)
- The Human Side (1934) - Justice of the Peace (uncredited)
- Among the Missing (1934) - Alvin Abbott
- Tomorrow's Youth (1934) - School Principal (uncredited)
- Lady by Choice (1934) - Bradley - Court Clerk (uncredited)
- Cheating Cheaters (1934) - Hanley (uncredited)
- Kid Millions (1934) - Bartender (uncredited)
- Broadway Bill (1934) - Morgan's Bookkeeper (uncredited)
- White Lies (1934) - Davis (uncredited)
- Biography of a Bachelor Girl (1935) - Davison (uncredited)
- A Night at the Ritz (1935) - Dining Banker (uncredited)
- Living on Velvet (1935) - Talkative Man at Party (uncredited)
- Private Worlds (1935) - Johnson's father
- It Happened in New York (1935) - Theatre Manager (uncredited)
- Baby Face Harrington (1935) - Bank Cashier (uncredited)
- Love in Bloom (1935) - Sexton (uncredited)
- Stranded (1935) - Train Conductor (uncredited)
- Front Page Woman (1935) - Jury Foreman (uncredited)
- Woman Wanted (1935) - Third Juror Talking to Mike (uncredited)
- Man on the Flying Trapeze (1935) - Passing Motorist (uncredited)
- China Seas (1935) - Ship's Passenger (uncredited)
- Diamond Jim (1935) - Brady's Secretary (uncredited)
- I Live My Life (1935) - Museum Curator (uncredited)
- This Is the Life (1935) - Dr. Dudley - Sunday School Picnic Minister (uncredited)
- Way Down East (1935) - Mr. Peabody
- Personal Maid's Secret (1935) - Candlesticks Salesman (uncredited)
- 1,000 Dollars a Minute (1935) - Dr. Cromley (uncredited)
- Rendezvous (1935) - Cashier (uncredited)
- Thanks a Million (1935) - Father (uncredited)
- Stars Over Broadway (1935) - Man in Church (uncredited)
- Ah, Wilderness! (1935) - Minor Role - Scenes Deleted (uncredited)
- Millions in the Air (1935) - Mr. Waldo-Walker
- Riffraff (1936) - Minister at Wedding (uncredited)
- Strike Me Pink (1936) - Club Lido Patron (uncredited)
- Dancing Feet (1936) - Hotel Assistant Manager
- Next Time We Love (1936) - Desk Clerk (uncredited)
- Hell-Ship Morgan (1936) - Minister
- Don't Get Personal (1936) - Foreman (uncredited)
- It Had to Happen (1936) - Beatrice's Secretary (scenes deleted)
- The Country Doctor (1936) - Clergyman (uncredited)
- Mr. Deeds Goes to Town (1936) - Anderson (uncredited)
- Florida Special (1936) - Conductor (uncredited)
- Three of a Kind (1936) - Mr. Fash
- Parole! (1936) - Dr. Arthur Carroll (uncredited)
- Trapped by Television (1936) - Telephone Man (uncredited)
- We Went to College (1936) - Sightseeing Alumnus (uncredited)
- Rhythm on the Range (1936) - Minister (uncredited)
- Yours for the Asking (1936) - Art Dealer (uncredited)
- The Gorgeous Hussy (1936) - President's Secretary (uncredited)
- Wives Never Know (1936) - Justice of the Peace (uncredited)
- Murder with Pictures (1936) - Gas Station Attendant (uncredited)
- Cain and Mabel (1936) - Man in Library (uncredited)
- Wedding Present (1936) - Ticket Seller (uncredited)
- Libeled Lady (1936) - Justice of the Peace (uncredited)
- The Public Pays (1936, Short) - Grocer (uncredited)
- All American Chump (1936) - Prof. Spring (uncredited)
- Come and Get It (1936) - Thomas Gubbins (uncredited)
- Easy to Take (1936) - Relative (uncredited)
- The Accusing Finger (1936) - Senator (uncredited)
- Gold Diggers of 1937 (1936) - Dr. Henry
- Girl Overboard (1937) - Mr. Ainsley (uncredited)
- Sing While You're Able (1937) - C. William Williams
- A Star Is Born (1937) - Niles' Assistant (uncredited)
- Let Them Live (1937) - Train Conductor (uncredited)
- The Road Back (1937) - Forman / Porter (uncredited)
- Riding on Air (1937) - Mayor
- Ever Since Eve (1937) - Purity League Manager (uncredited)
- New Faces of 1937 (1937) - Count Moody's Secretary
- Marry the Girl (1937) - Patient with Fife (uncredited)
- Broadway Melody of 1938 (1937) - Bertram (uncredited)
- Partners in Crime (1937) - Committee Man (uncredited)
- Trouble at Midnight (1937) - Doctor
- The Jury's Secret (1938) - Jury Foreman (uncredited)
- When G-Men Step In (1938) - Mr. Drake (uncredited)
- International Crime (1938) - Barrows
- Women Are Like That (1938) - Mr. Frazier - the Divorce Lawyer (uncredited)
- Little Miss Broadway (1938) - Club Secretary (uncredited)
- Letter of Introduction (1938) - Minor Role (uncredited)
- I Am the Law (1938) - Mr. Higgins - Witness (uncredited)
- The Lady Objects (1938) - Prof. Fenner (uncredited)
- The Little Adventuress (1938) - Henry Lowell
- Inside Story (1939) - Conductor (uncredited)
- Panama Patrol (1939) - Clerk (uncredited)
- Let Us Live (1939) - Hijacked Motorist (uncredited)
- East Side of Heaven (1939) - James Travers (uncredited)
- The Kid from Texas (1939) - Appleby - on Telephone (voice, uncredited)
- Should Husbands Work? (1939) - Snodgrass
- I Stole a Million (1939) - Sexton (uncredited)
- When Tomorrow Comes (1939) - Reverend Mr. Morris (uncredited)
- Our Leading Citizen (1939) - Director
- The Star Maker (1939) - Conductor
- Mr. Smith Goes to Washington (1939) - Arthur Kim (uncredited)
- The Roaring Twenties (1939) - Restaurant Patron (uncredited)
- His Girl Friday (1940) - Insurance Doctor (uncredited)
- City of Chance (1940) - Gambling House Patron (uncredited)
- Danger on Wheels (1940) - Jones
- Road to Singapore (1940) - Secretary (uncredited)
- Flash Gordon Conquers the Universe (1940, Serial) - Keedish [Chs. 6-7]
- The Doctor Takes a Wife (1940) - Dapper Salesman (uncredited)
- Edison, the Man (1940) - Preacher (uncredited)
- Those Were the Days! (1940) - Conductor (uncredited)
- Queen of the Mob (1940) - Lawyer
- Stranger on the Third Floor (1940) - Court Clerk (uncredited)
- Spring Parade (1940) - Mandate (uncredited)
- The Ape (1940) - Quinn (uncredited)
- Slightly Tempted (1940) - Cartwright
- One Night in the Tropics (1940) - Mr. Moore's Doctor (uncredited)
- Life with Henry (1940) - Business Man (uncredited)
- Behind the News (1940) - Justice of the Peace (uncredited)
- The Invisible Woman (1940) - Want-Ad Clerk (uncredited)
- Golden Hoofs (1941) - Critt (uncredited)
- The Monster and the Girl (1941) - Rev. Russell (uncredited)
- Men of Boys Town (1941) - Senior Minister (scenes deleted)
- The Black Cat (1941) - Coroner (uncredited)
- They Dare Not Love (1941) - Army Officer (uncredited)
- Blondie in Society (1941) - Angry Neighbor With Petunia Beds (uncredited)
- The Big Store (1941) - Henry (uncredited)
- Sweetheart of the Campus (1941) - The Judge (uncredited)
- Hello, Sucker (1941) - Galloway (uncredited)
- Mystery Ship (1941) - Apartment Manager (uncredited)
- Buy Me That Town (1941) - Reverend Brooks
- The Stork Pays Off (1941) - Mr. Dennison (uncredited)
- New York Town (1941) - Spectator (uncredited)
- Tillie the Toiler (1941)
- Blondie Goes to College (1942) - Professor
- Frisco Lil (1942) - Judge
- Sing Your Worries Away (1942) - Justice of the Peace (uncredited)
- Yokel Boy (1942) - Minister (uncredited)
- Hi, Neighbor (1942) - Minister (uncredited)
- The Gay Sisters (1942) - Records Clerk (uncredited)
- Busses Roar (1942) - Henry Dipper
- Get Hep to Love (1942) - Music Judge (uncredited)
- Mrs. Wiggs of the Cabbage Patch (1942) - Minister (uncredited)
- The Payoff (1942) - Dr. Steele
- They Got Me Covered (1943) - Singing Hotel Waiter (uncredited)
- Hangmen Also Die! (1943) - Townsman (uncredited)
- Family Troubles (1943, Short) - Mr. Tom Jones
- Henry Aldrich Gets Glamour (1943) - Mr. Japes (uncredited)
- Dixie (1943) - Publisher (uncredited)
- Someone to Remember (1943) - College Trustee (uncredited)
- Top Man (1943) - Teacher (uncredited)
- Princess O'Rourke (1943) - Matilda's Husband (uncredited)
- Girl Crazy (1943) - Governor's Crony (uncredited)
- Knickerbocker Holiday (1944) - Councilman (uncredited)
- Her Primitive Man (1944) - Lecture Attendee (uncredited)
- Henry Aldrich Plays Cupid (1944) - Teacher (uncredited)
- Mr. Skeffington (1944) - Rector (uncredited)
- Make Your Own Bed (1944) - Mr. Brookin (uncredited)
- Henry Aldrich's Little Secret (1944) - Mr. Tottle
- Bowery to Broadway (1944) - Reformer (uncredited)
- And Now Tomorrow (1944) - Episcopalian Minister (uncredited)
- The Town Went Wild (1944) - Mr. Wilson, Marriage License Clerk (uncredited)
- Belle of the Yukon (1944) - Saloon Patron with Hat (uncredited)
- Youth on Trial (1945) - Motor Court Manager (uncredited)
- Wife Wanted (1946) - Friendship Club Victim (uncredited)
