= Henry Aldrich's Little Secret =

1944 film

- Theatrical release poster
- Directed by: Hugh Bennett
- Written by: Val Burton; Aleen Leslie
- Produced by: Michael Kraike
- Starring: Jimmy Lydon; Charles Smith; John Litel; Olive Blakeney; Tina Thayer; Ann Doran
- Cinematography: Daniel L. Fapp
- Edited by: Everett Douglas
- Music by: John Leipold
- Production company: Paramount Pictures
- Distributed by: Paramount Pictures
- Release date: June 10, 1944
- Running time: 75 minutes
- Country: United States
- Language: English

Henry Aldrich's Little Secret is a 1944 American comedy film directed by Hugh Bennett and written by Val Burton and Aleen Leslie. The film stars Jimmy Lydon, Charles Smith, John Litel, Olive Blakeney, Tina Thayer and Ann Doran. The film was released on June 10, 1944, by Paramount Pictures.

== Plot ==
Henry Aldrich and Basil 'Dizzy' Stevens run a baby sitting service, but quickly run into problems. When a mother of a 10 month old baby exits town her husband is accused of a crime he didn't commit, sans baby, Aldrich and Stevens are left holding the bag, and the baby.

== Cast ==
- Jimmy Lydon as Henry Aldrich
- Charles Smith as Dizzy Stevens
- John Litel as Mr. Aldrich
- Olive Blakeney as Mrs. Aldrich
- Tina Thayer as Jennifer Dale
- Ann Doran as Helen Martin
- John David Robb as Ricky Martin
- Sarah Edwards as Mrs. Winnibegar
- Harry C. Bradley as Mr. Tottle
- Lucille Ward as Mrs. O'Hara
- Almira Sessions as Aunt Maude
- Tom Fadden as Mr.Luther
- George M. Carleton as Judge Hyde
- Byron Foulger as Bill Collector
- Fern Emmett as Miss Swithen
- Dorothy Vaughan as Mrs. Olsen
- Eddie Dunn as Policeman
- Hal K. Dawson as Photographer
- Noel Neill as Daisy
- Lester Dorr as Joe
