= Henry Aldrich Haunts a House =

1943 film

- Theatrical release poster
- Directed by: Hugh Bennett
- Written by: Muriel Roy Bolton; Val Burton
- Produced by: Michael Kraike
- Starring: Jimmy Lydon; Charles Smith; John Litel; Olive Blakeney; Joan Mortimer; Vaughan Glaser
- Cinematography: Daniel L. Fapp
- Edited by: Everett Douglas
- Music by: Gerard Carbonara
- Production company: Paramount Pictures
- Distributed by: Paramount Pictures
- Release date: November 10, 1943
- Running time: 73 minutes
- Country: United States
- Language: English

Henry Aldrich Haunts a House is a 1943 American comedy horror film, directed by Hugh Bennett and written by Muriel Roy Bolton and Val Burton. The film stars Jimmy Lydon, Charles Smith, John Litel, Olive Blakeney, Joan Mortimer and Vaughan Glaser. The film was released on November 10, 1943, by Paramount Pictures.

The film primarily uses the concept of the haunted house. The film was part of the Henry Aldrich film series (1939–1944). Jimmy Lydon portrayed the title character in 9 films of the series. He had been cast as a replacement to the film series' original star, Jackie Cooper.

== Plot ==
Henry Aldrich swallows a serum by accident and ends up in a "haunted" house.

== Cast ==
- Jimmy Lydon as Henry Aldrich
- Charles Smith as Basil 'Dizzy' Stevens
- John Litel as Sam Aldrich
- Olive Blakeney as Alice Aldrich
- Joan Mortimer as Elise Towers
- Vaughan Glaser as Thomas Bradley
- Jackie Moran as Whit Bidecker
- Lucien Littlefield as Mr. Quid
- Ray Walker as Detective Beamish

== Production ==
Gail Russell was meant to play Elise. When she was cast in The Uninvited Paramount pulled her out of the role, and cast Joan Mortimer instead.
