= Henry and Dizzy =

1942 film

- Directed by: Hugh Bennett
- Written by: Val Burton
- Produced by: Sol C. Siegel
- Starring: Jimmy Lydon; Mary Anderson; Charles Smith; John Litel; Olive Blakeney; Maude Eburne
- Cinematography: Daniel L. Fapp
- Edited by: Everett Douglas
- Music by: Leigh Harline
- Production company: Paramount Pictures
- Distributed by: Paramount Pictures
- Release date: June 5, 1942
- Running time: 71 minutes
- Country: United States
- Language: English

Henry and Dizzy is a 1942 American comedy film directed by Hugh Bennett and written by Val Burton. The film stars Jimmy Lydon, Mary Anderson, Charles Smith, John Litel, Olive Blakeney and Maude Eburne. The film was released on June 5, 1942, by Paramount Pictures.

== Cast ==
- Jimmy Lydon as Henry Aldrich
- Mary Anderson as Phyillis Michael
- Charles Smith as Dizzy Stevens
- John Litel as Mr. Sam Aldrich
- Olive Blakeney as Mrs. Mary Aldrich
- Maude Eburne as Mrs. Bradley
- Vaughan Glaser as Mr. Bradley
- Shirley Coates as Jennie Kilmer
- Olin Howland as Mr. Stevens
- Minerva Urecal as Mrs. Kilmer
- Trevor Bardette as Mr. Weeks
- Carl Switzer as Billy Weeks
- Warren Hymer as Tramp
- Noel Neill as Jean
- Jane Cowan as Pamela Rogers
- Eleanor Counts as Dizzy's Girl
- Isabel Withers as Mrs. Stevens
- Frank Orth as Joe McGuire
- Edgar Dearing as Police Sergeant McElroy
- Mary Currier as Mrs. Michael
- William Wright as Announcer
- Anne O'Neal as Mr. Stevens' Secretary
