= Henry Aldrich, Boy Scout =

1944 American comedy film

- Theatrical release poster
- Directed by: Hugh Bennett
- Written by: Muriel Roy Bolton; Agnes Christine Johnston
- Produced by: Walter MacEwen
- Starring: Jimmy Lydon; Charles Smith; John Litel; Olive Blakeney; Joan Mortimer; Minor Watson
- Cinematography: Daniel L. Fapp
- Edited by: Everett Douglas
- Music by: Werner R. Heymann
- Production company: Paramount Pictures
- Distributed by: Paramount Pictures
- Release date: January 13, 1944
- Running time: 66 minutes
- Country: United States
- Language: English

Henry Aldrich, Boy Scout is a 1944 American comedy film directed by Hugh Bennett and written by Muriel Roy Bolton and Agnes Christine Johnston. Ninth in a series of 11 films made between 1939 and 1944 about the Aldrich family and their irrepressible teenage son, Henry, played by Jimmy Lydon, it also stars Charles Smith, John Litel, Olive Blakeney, Joan Mortimer, David Holt, and Minor Watson. Released on January 13, 1944, by Paramount Pictures, it was the first feature film to be made in cooperation with the Boy Scouts of America, who provided a technical advisor to the studio.

== Plot ==
Henry Aldrich (Jimmy Lydon), the Senior Patrol Leader of his Boy Scout troop, aspires to be promoted to Junior Assistant Scoutmaster to impress his budding love interest, Elise Towers. Henry is anxious for his troop to excel at an upcoming council camporee competition to earn the coveted promotion.

Meanwhile, Henry's father, Sam (John Litel), invites Ramsey Kent (Minor Watson), an old college chum and prosperous industrialist, to visit his town in hopes of convincing him to locate a new manufacturing plant there. En route to the Aldrich's house for dinner, Kent's car breaks down on a desolate road. Henry and his Boy Scout troop come to Kent's aid by giving the car a push.

Impressed by Henry's helpfulness, Kent decides that Scouting would be a good influence on his spoiled brat of a son, Peter (Darryl Hickman). Compelled to join Henry's troop, Peter initially scoffs at the other Scouts as a "bunch of pantywaists" and antagonizes everyone by shirking his duties and playing a number of pranks to sabotage Henry's troop at the camporee. He even feigns a sprained ankle while hiking, to get the other Scouts to carry him on an improvised stretcher. After he is challenged to a fistfight by a Scout he has taunted and is roughed up off-screen, a reformed Peter strives to win acceptance by his fellows and help his troop win the competition. Having learned the meaning of Scout's honor the hard way, he begins to appreciate Henry's standing up for him when no one else wanted him around.

Irwin Barrett (David Holt), the unscrupulous Senior Patrol Leader of a rival troop, tampers with a competitor's compass to ensure his troop's victory in the camporee orienteering event. When the malfunctioning compass causes a troop to become lost, Henry suspects that Peter is to blame, despite the young Tenderfoot's denials. Even when Peter solemnly declares his innocence of the nefarious deed "on Scout's Honor", Henry retorts angrily, "What would you know of Scout's Honor?".

Distraught that Henry disbelieves him, Peter runs away that night and stumbles over a cliff in the dark, landing precariously on a narrow ledge. He is eventually located by a search party of Scouts and leaders led by Henry and Dizzy Stevens (Charles Smith). Henry is lowered by a rope into the deep chasm to rescue Peter and both boys are pulled to safety after a tense struggle. Irwin, realizing that his deceitful actions almost cost Peter his life, confesses that he is to blame and is "unworthy to be a Scout".

At the conclusion of the camporee, Henry's victorious troop marches in review as his beaming parents look on and Elise blows him a kiss.

This picture had the official support of the BSA, which supplied a technical advisor to Paramount Pictures during filming for accurate depiction of Scouting details and uniforming. In the camporee scenes, actual Boy Scouts from the Los Angeles area were used.

== Cast ==
- Jimmy Lydon as Henry Aldrich
- Charles Smith as Dizzy Stevens
- John Litel as Sam Aldrich
- Olive Blakeney as Mrs. Aldrich
- Joan Mortimer as Elise Towers
- Minor Watson as Ramsey Kent
- Darryl Hickman as Peter Kent
- Ralph Hoopes as David Carter
- David Holt as Irwin Barrett

== Critical response ==
Jane Corby of the Brooklyn Eagle wrote that the film, although primarily a comedy in common with the preceding eight Henry Aldrich films, also had a serious message by stressing Scouting's high principles and code of honor. The Louisville, Kentucky, Courier-Journal said the film provided "welcome relief" from the "Dead End Kids"-type film portraying hoodlums and juvenile delinquents, calling it a "story of young ideals" and "fair play". The Altoona Tribune gave the film high marks, saying the film is for "moviegoers who enjoy a good laugh" and calling it the best of the Aldrich series, while singling out the perilous rescue scene as "one of the most thrilling rescues ever filmed"

== See also ==
- Boy Scouts in films
