= Henry Aldrich, Editor =

1942 film

- Directed by: Hugh Bennett
- Written by: Muriel Roy Bolton; Val Burton
- Produced by: Sol C. Siegel
- Starring: Jimmy Lydon; Charles Smith; John Litel; Olive Blakeney; Rita Quigley; Vaughan Glaser
- Cinematography: Henry Sharp
- Edited by: Everett Douglas
- Music by: Leo Shuken
- Production company: Paramount Pictures
- Distributed by: Paramount Pictures
- Release date: September 1942
- Running time: 72 minutes
- Country: United States
- Language: English

Henry Aldrich, Editor is a 1942 American comedy film directed by Hugh Bennett and written by Muriel Roy Bolton and Val Burton. The film stars Jimmy Lydon, Charles Smith, John Litel, Olive Blakeney, Rita Quigley and Vaughan Glaser. The film was released in September 1942, by Paramount Pictures.

== Plot ==
Henry Aldrich is the newspaper editor at his high school, his objective is to double newspaper circulation. Henry finds his chance when a warehouse fire occurs and he meets a newspaper man that teaches him how to manipulate stories so they are more interesting. After hinting that there was something sinister about the fire and releasing the newspaper, the story spreads fast. As he continues to cover fires, people start believing he is the arsonist.

== Cast ==
- Jimmy Lydon as Henry Aldrich
- Charles Smith as Dizzy Stevens
- John Litel as Mr. Samuel W. Aldrich
- Olive Blakeney as Mrs. Alice Aldrich
- Rita Quigley as Martha Daley
- Vaughan Glaser as Mr. Bradley
- Charles Halton as Elias Noonan
- Francis Pierlot as Nero Smith
- Cliff Clark as Fire Chief
- Fern Emmett as Miss Bryant
- Maude Eburne as Mrs. Norris
- William Halligan as Norman Kenly
- Ray Walker as Jack Lewis
- Oscar O'Shea as Judge Sanders
- Leon Belasco as Leon Brink
- Chester Clute as Clerk in drug store
- Paul Matthews as Robert Allen
- Edgar Dearing as McLean
- Matt McHugh as Charlie
- Frank M. Thomas as Mayor
