= Henry Aldrich Swings It =

1943 film

- Theatrical release poster
- Directed by: Hugh Bennett
- Written by: Muriel Roy Bolton; Val Burton
- Produced by: Michael Kraike
- Starring: Jimmy Lydon; Charles Smith; John Litel; Olive Blakeney; Vaughan Glaser; Marian Hall
- Cinematography: Daniel L. Fapp
- Edited by: Archie Marshek
- Music by: Paul Sawtell
- Production company: Paramount Pictures
- Distributed by: Paramount Pictures
- Release date: June 23, 1943
- Running time: 64 minutes
- Country: United States
- Language: English

Henry Aldrich Swings It is a 1943 American comedy film directed by Hugh Bennett and written by Muriel Roy Bolton and Val Burton. The film stars Jimmy Lydon, Charles Smith, John Litel, Olive Blakeney, Vaughan Glaser and Marian Hall. The film was released on June 23, 1943, by Paramount Pictures.

== Cast ==
- Jimmy Lydon as Henry Aldrich
- Charles Smith as Dizzy Stevens
- John Litel as Mr. Aldrich
- Olive Blakeney as Mrs. Aldrich
- Mimi Chandler as Mimi Gray
- Vaughan Glaser as Mr. Bradley
- Marian Hall as Louise Elliott
- Beverly Hudson as Margie
- Fritz Feld as Josef Altman
- Charles Arnt as Boyle
