= Vaughan Glaser =

American actor (1872–1958)

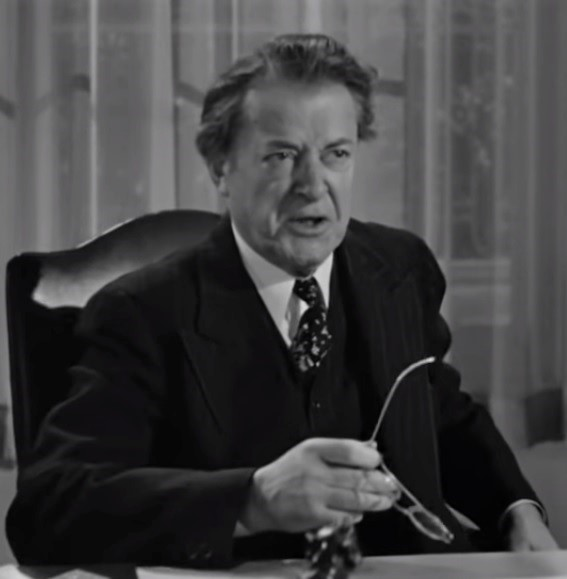
- Glaser in Meet John Doe (1941)
- Born: November 17, 1872; Cleveland, Ohio, U.S.
- Died: November 23, 1958 (aged 86); Van Nuys, California, U.S.
- Years active: 1939–1944 (film)
- Spouse: Lois Landon (m. 1927; died 1958)
- Children: 2

Vaughan Glaser (November 17, 1872 – November 23, 1958) was an American stage and film actor. His stage career started a long time before the First World War; he often appeared opposite Fay Courteney in the 1910s. He appeared in seven Broadway productions between 1902 and 1945. In the late 1930s, he turned to Hollywood and played the school principal Bradley in several Henry Aldrich films.

== Early years ==
Glaser was born on November 17, 1872, in Cleveland, Ohio. His father was a tanner who became proprietor of a shoe store.

== Career ==
=== Stage ===
Glaser's stock company began performing in the Colonial Theatre in Cleveland in 1904 with Laura Nelson Hall as the leading lady. The engagement was initially considered to be short-term, but success kept the troupe there for more than a year. The company performed 57 plays in 61 weeks, with four plays presented for two weeks each. Glaser continued to act in Cleveland until at least 1907, starring in 1,000 productions. According to one journalist, "His picture was on the dressing tables of hundreds of girls." A theater manager said that when Glaser had his hair cut in a barber shop, "girls crowded into the shop and fought for locks of his hair as the barber clipped them off".

Glaser moved from Cleveland to Toronto after World War I. His company played there at least into the 1920s. George Jean Nathan wrote in Theatre Book of the Year 1943-44 that Glaser's success on stage came less from his acting skills than from his personal appeal: "It was thus that Vaughan Glaser, a mediocre actor but one possessed of the look and manner to enchant the servant girls and their equally impressionable mistresses, made such a company a success in the Middle West."

=== Film ===
Glaser made his film debut in 1939 as the high-school principal Bradley in What a Life (1939), a role which he had already played in the Broadway play of the same name. Frank S. Nugent raved about Glaser's performance in The New York Times as the "inspired portrait of an elderly high school principal—the weary dignity, the monumental patience (which has seen every possible form of bad boy, heard every possible excuse), the pedagogical deliberation (not unmixed with hamminess), the taste for neatly turned and rhetorically conclusive sentences, the ability to strip a lying pupil to the skin with ruthless professional logic—is not only the most perfect comical characterization of the year, but is something encountered only once or twice in a generation. So flawless has Mr. Glaser become, by dint of long polishing at his performance ("What a Life" played for a year and four months on Broadway), that there is something almost eternal about his conception of Mr. Bradley. If you have gone as far as high school in your academic studies, you will remble in your boots when Mr. Glaser speaks, or looks at you over the tops of his bifocals."

Glaser continued his role as Mr. Bradley during the 1940s in the Henry Aldrich film series, which was based on What a Life. One of his more notable film roles also included the blind and wise uncle of Priscilla Lane in Alfred Hitchcock's thriller Saboteur. He also portrayed supporting roles in the Frank Capra movies Meet John Doe and Arsenic and Old Lace. Glaser retired from film business after 21 films in five years.

== Personal life and death ==
Glaser married actress Lois Landon in New York on May 22, 1927. At that time she was the leading lady of his theatrical company. He died on November 23, 1958, in Van Nuys, California.

== Filmography ==
Year	Title	Role	Notes
1939	What a Life	J.C. Bradley	
1939	Rulers of the Sea	Junius Smith	
1940	Those Were the Days!	Judge Malachi Scroggs	
1940	Girl from Avenue A	Bishop Phelps	
1941	Meet John Doe	Governor	
1941	Thieves Fall Out	Charles Matthews	
1941	Adventure in Washington	Bundy	
1941	Henry Aldrich for President	Mr. Bradley	
1942	Saboteur	Philip Martin	
1942	My Favorite Spy	Colonel Moffett	
1942	Henry and Dizzy	Mr. Bradley	
1942	I Married an Angel	Fr. Andreas	Uncredited
1942	The Pride of the Yankees	Doctor in Gehrig Home	Uncredited
1942	Henry Aldrich, Editor	Mr. Bradley	
1943	Shadow of a Doubt	Dr. Phillips	Uncredited
1943	Henry Aldrich Gets Glamour	Mr. Bradley	
1943	Henry Aldrich Swings It	Mr. Bradley	
1943	Henry Aldrich Haunts a House	Mr. Bradley	
1944	Henry Aldrich Plays Cupid	Mr. Bradley	
1944	Once Upon a Time	Professor Draper - Lepidopterist	Uncredited
1944	Arsenic and Old Lace	Judge Cullman	(final film role)
