= Henry Aldrich Plays Cupid =

1944 film

- Theatrical release poster
- Directed by: Hugh Bennett
- Screenplay by: Muriel Roy Bolton; Val Burton
- Story by: Aleen Leslie
- Produced by: Walter MacEwen
- Starring: Jimmy Lydon; Charles Smith; John Litel; Olive Blakeney; Diana Lynn; Vaughan Glaser
- Cinematography: Daniel L. Fapp
- Edited by: Everett Douglas
- Music by: Werner R. Heymann
- Production company: Paramount Pictures
- Distributed by: Paramount Pictures
- Release date: April 1944
- Running time: 65 minutes
- Country: United States
- Language: English

Henry Aldrich Plays Cupid is a 1944 American comedy film directed by Hugh Bennett and written by Muriel Roy Bolton and Val Burton. The film stars Jimmy Lydon, Charles Smith, John Litel, Olive Blakeney, Diana Lynn and Vaughan Glaser. The film was released in April 1944, by Paramount Pictures.

== Plot ==
Henry plays matchmaker for Mr. Bradley (Vaughan Glaser), his principal and botany teacher at Central High, figuring that marital bliss might mellow the gruff educator and make it easier to get a passing grade and graduate. Bringing a woman into Bradley's life proves to be complicated, made more so by Mrs. Terwilliger (Barbara Jo Allen), a conniving spinster.

== Cast ==
- Jimmy Lydon as Henry Aldrich
- Charles Smith as Dizzy
- John Litel as Mr. Aldrich
- Olive Blakeney as Mrs. Aldrich
- Diana Lynn as Phyllis Michael
- Vaughan Glaser as Mr. Bradley
- Barbara Jo Allen (also called Vera Vague) as "Blue Eyes" (Mrs. Terwilliger)
- Paul Harvey as Sen. Caldicott

== Critical response ==
The Owensboro Messenger called the film "fast-moving and laugh-provoking entertainment". Barbara Jo Allen (also called Vera Vague) "cavorts along with the Aldrich family to add to the merriment", the Kentucky newspaper said.
