= Gene Reynolds =

American actor, producer, writer, and director (1923–2020)

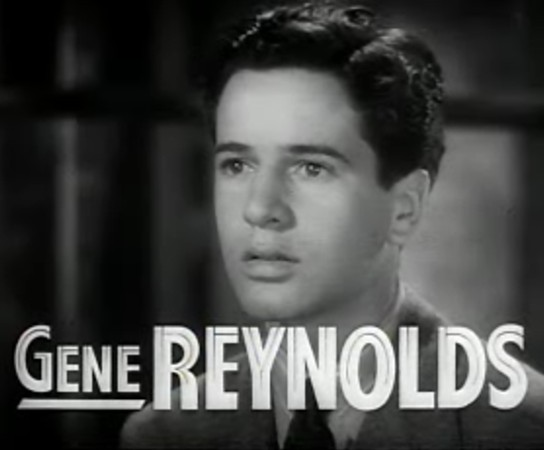
- in the trailer for the film Gallant Sons (1940)
- Born: Eugene Reynolds Blumenthal; April 4, 1923; Cleveland, Ohio, U.S.
- Died: February 3, 2020 (aged 96); Burbank, California, U.S.
- Resting place: Forest Lawn Memorial Park (Glendale)
- Occupations: Producer; director; screenwriter; actor
- Years active: 1934–1999
- Spouses: Bonnie Jones (m. 1967; div. 1976); Ann Sweeny (m. 1979)
- Children: 1
- Awards: 6 Primetime Emmy Awards; 2 Directors Guild Awards; Writers Guild of America Award

Eugene Reynolds Blumenthal (April 4, 1923 – February 3, 2020) was an American screenwriter, director, producer, and actor. He was one of the developers and producers of the TV series M*A*S*H.

== Early life ==
Reynolds was born on April 4, 1923, to Frank Eugene Blumenthal, a businessman and entrepreneur, and Maude Evelyn (Schwab) Blumenthal, a model, in Cleveland, Ohio. He was of Jewish heritage. Reynolds initially was raised in Detroit, before the family relocated to Los Angeles in 1934.

Reynolds served in the United States Navy during World War II. He served on ships including a destroyer-minesweeper the USS Zane. Following the war, Reynolds received a degree in history at the University of California, Los Angeles, and resumed his acting career.

== Career ==
=== Acting ===
Reynolds made his screen debut in the 1934 Our Gang short Washee Ironee, and for the next three decades made numerous appearances in films such as Captains Courageous (1937), Adventure in Washington (1941), and Eagle Squadron (1942).

He was contracted to MGM between 1937 and 1940 and appeared alongside MGM's big youth star Mickey Rooney a number of times, including Love Finds Andy Hardy (1938) and Boys Town (1938), in which he appeared a responsible teenager voted to be head of the kids in Boys Town. In 1939, he had one of the leading roles alongside in the musical film They Shall Have Music (1939) alongside Joel McCrea and Jascha Heifetz. In Santa Fe Trail (1940), he appears in a largely fictional role as the abolitionist Jason Brown's son.

As a child actor, Reynolds often played the young version of the film's star character. He did this for Ricardo Cortez in 1937's The Californian, Tyrone Power in In Old Chicago (1938), James Stewart in 1938's Of Human Hearts and Don Ameche in Sins of Man (1936).

As an adult in the 1950s, he had a supporting role in The Country Girl (1954) with Grace Kelly and Bing Crosby. He also appeared on television series like I Love Lucy, Armstrong Circle Theatre, Whirlybirds, The Silent Service, and Hallmark Hall of Fame, before largely ending his acting career in the late 1950s.

=== Directing and writing ===
Following his return to acting after serving in World War II, Reynolds became frustrated with not being able to land leading roles and the general progress of his career, and turned to directing, shooting episodes of shows such as Leave It to Beaver, The Andy Griffith Show, and My Three Sons. The Munsters.

In 1957, Reynolds joined forces with Frank Gruber and James Brooks to create Tales of Wells Fargo for NBC. During the program's five-year run he wrote and directed numerous episodes.

Reynolds' additional directing credits include multiple episodes of Father of the Bride, The Farmer's Daughter, F Troop, Hogan's Heroes, and Many Happy Returns. He was the Executive Producer for Room 222, a breakthrough comedy-drama on the ABC network which was about an African American school teacher, and which dealt with subjects such as drugs, prejudice and dropping out of school. The series ran for over 100 episodes, some of which Reynolds directed. ABC released Reynolds from the show when it thought making the show funnier would result in higher ratings.

As a writer, director, and producer, Reynolds was involved with two highly successful CBS series in the 1970s and early 1980s. Between 1972 and 1983, he produced 120 episodes of M*A*S*H, which he co-created with Larry Gelbart, and for which he also wrote 11 episodes and directed 24. During that same period, he produced 22 episodes of Lou Grant, for which he wrote (or co-wrote) five episodes and directed 11.

Reynolds was nominated for twenty-four Emmy Awards and won six times, including Outstanding Comedy Series for M*A*S*H and Outstanding Drama Series twice for Lou Grant, which also earned him a Humanitas Prize. He won the Directors Guild of America Award for Outstanding Direction of a Comedy Series twice for his work on M*A*S*H and the Directors Guild of America Award for Outstanding Direction of a Drama Series once for his work on Lou Grant.

Reynolds was elected President of the Directors Guild of America in 1993, a position he held until 1997.

== Personal life ==
Reynolds was married to actress-turned-author Bonnie Jones, who appeared in five episodes of M*A*S*H as Lt. Barbara Bannerman, from 1972 until 1975, when the couple divorced. He and his second wife, actress Ann Sweeny, who also appeared on M*A*S*H as Nurse Carrie Donovan in the episode "Hanky Panky", married in 1979 and have one son.

Reynolds died at the age of 96 of heart failure on February 3, 2020, at Providence St. Joseph Medical Center in Burbank, California.

== Filmography ==
Year	Title	Role	Notes
1934	Babes in Toyland	Boy	Uncredited
1935	Transient Lady	Young boy	Uncredited
1935	The Calling of Dan Matthews	Tommy's friend	Uncredited
1936	Too Many Parents	Cadet	Uncredited
1936	Sins of Man	Karl Freyman as a boy	
1936	Thank You, Jeeves!	Bobby Smith	
1937	Captains Courageous	Boy in print shop	Uncredited
1937	The Californian	Ramon as a child	
1937	Madame X	Raymond Fleuriot (age 12–14)	Uncredited
1937	Heidi	Minor Role	Uncredited
1937	Thunder Trail	Richard Ames (age 14)	Uncredited
1938	In Old Chicago	Dion O'Leary as a boy	
1938	Of Human Hearts	Jason Wilkins as a child	
1938	Love Finds Andy Hardy	Jimmy McMahon	
1938	The Crowd Roars	Tommy McCoy as a boy	
1938	Boys Town	Tony Ponessa	
1939	The Spirit of Culver	Carruthers	
1939	The Flying Irishman	Clyde 'Douglas' Corrigan	
1939	They Shall Have Music	Frankie	
1939	Bad Little Angel	Tommy Wilks	
1940	The Blue Bird	Studious boy	
1940	Edison, the Man	Jimmy Price	
1940	The Mortal Storm	Rudi Roth	
1940	Gallant Sons	Johnny Davis	
1940	Santa Fe Trail	Jason Brown	
1941	Andy Hardy's Private Secretary	Jimmy McMahon	
1941	The Penalty	Roosty	
1941	Adventure in Washington	Marty Driscoll	
1942	Junior G-Men of the Air	Eddie Holden	
1942	The Tuttles of Tahiti	Ru	
1942	Eagle Squadron	The kid	
1948	Jungle Patrol	Lt. Marion Minor	
1949	The Big Cat	Wid Hawks	
1949	Slattery's Hurricane	Control tower operator	Uncredited
1953	99 River Street	Chuck	
1954	Prisoner of War	Capt. Richard Collingswood	Uncredited
1954	Down Three Dark Streets	Vince Angelino	
1954	The Country Girl	Larry	
1954	The Bridges at Toko-Ri	C.I.C. officer	
1955	The McConnell Story	B-17 pilot	Uncredited
1956	Diane	Montecuculli	
1956	The Man in the Gray Flannel Suit	Soldier	Uncredited
