= The Scent of the Roses =

1963 novel by Aleen Leslie

- First edition
- Author: Aleen Leslie
- Language: English
- Publisher: Viking Press
- Publication date: 1963
- Publication place: United States
- Media type: Print (hardback)
- Pages: 239 pp
- OCLC: 1287366
- Followed by: The Windfall

The Scent of the Roses is a novel by the American writer Aleen Leslie.

The title comes from a line of a poem by Thomas Moore: "You may break, you may shatter the vase, if you will, But the scent of the roses will hang round it still."

Set in 1908 Pittsburgh, Pennsylvania, the novel is the recollection of a year in the life of Jane Carlyle. At age ten she enters the threshold of a large house in Squirrel Hill and meets the Weber family, owners of a department store in the adjacent booming steel town of Braddock, and Jane is swept up into the exciting and sometimes eccentric happenings of the Weber household. This is the debut novel of Aleen Leslie, a native Pittsburgher best known for her Hollywood screenwriting credits.
