= Straight from the Shoulder (1936 film) =

1936 film by Stuart Heisler

- Directed by: Stuart Heisler
- Screenplay by: Lucian Cary; Madeleine Ruthven
- Produced by: A.M. Botsford
- Starring: Ralph Bellamy; Katherine Locke; David Holt; Andy Clyde; Purnell Pratt; Onslow Stevens
- Cinematography: Alfred Gilks
- Edited by: Everett Douglas
- Production company: Paramount Pictures
- Distributed by: Paramount Pictures
- Release date: August 28, 1936
- Running time: 87 minutes
- Country: United States
- Language: English

Straight from the Shoulder is a 1936 American drama film directed by Stuart Heisler, written by Lucian Cary and Madeleine Ruthven, and starring Ralph Bellamy, Katherine Locke, David Holt, Andy Clyde, Purnell Pratt and Onslow Stevens. It was released on August 28, 1936, by Paramount Pictures.

== Cast ==
- Ralph Bellamy as Curt Hayden
- Katherine Locke as Gail Pyne
- David Holt as Johnny Hayden
- Andy Clyde as J. M. Pyne
- Purnell Pratt as James McBride
- Onslow Stevens as Mr. Wendi
- Chick Chandler as Fly
- Rollo Lloyd as Mr. Blake
- Bert Hanlon as Baldy
- Paul Fix as Trigger Benson
- Noel Madison as Trim

== Critical reception ==
Lionel Collier, for the British magazine, Picturegoer, wrote positively of the film and commented, “A strong child interest together with gangster thrills and romantic element make for quite good entertainment, especially as the direction is polished.” While mentioning the quality of performances given by Ralph Bellamy and Katherine Locke, he offered praise to one cast member : “Honours go to David Holt, a juvenile artiste, who is not nearly so precocious as most, and who reacts very naturally to the various situations.”
