= Mr. What's-His-Name? =

- Enid Stamp-Taylor, Louis Broughton, Seymour Hicks and Olive Blakeney
- Directed by: Ralph Ince
- Written by: Thomas J. Geraghty; Frank Launder
- Based on: play by Seymour Hicks adapted from the French play by Yves Mirande; André Mouëzy-Éon
- Starring: Seymour Hicks
- Production company: Warner Bros
- Release date: 1935
- Running time: 78 minutes
- Country: England
- Language: English

Mr What's His Name is a lost 1935 British film directed by Ralph Ince and starring Seymour Hicks and Olive Blakeney. It was written by Thomas J. Geraghty and Frank Launder was based on the play by Hicks adapted from the French play by Yves Mirande and André Mouëzy-Éon. It was shot at Warner Bros' Teddington Studios.

== Preservation status ==
The British Film Institute has classed Mr. What's-His-Name? as a lost film. Its National Archive holds a collection of ephemera and stills but no film or video materials.

== Plot ==
A beautician meets and falls in love with a young man, and they soon marry. What she doesn't know, however, is that her new husband is actually a millionaire who is suffering from amnesia – and he already has a wife.

== Cast ==
- Seymour Hicks as Alfred Henfield
- Olive Blakeney as Ann Henfield
- Enid Stamp-Taylor as Corinne Henfield
- Garry Marsh as Yates
- Toni Edgar-Bruce as Sylvia
- Martita Hunt as Mrs. Davies
- Henry B. Longhurst as Mr. Bullen
- Louis Broughton as Mr. Holt

== Reception ==
The Monthly Film Bulletin wrote: "The delightful acting of Seymour Hicks is by no means the only merit of this excellent production. Casting, acting, direction, settings, and photography are all excellent, and the story itself is really amusing, with plenty of well-written dialogue. The only criticisms it seems possible to make are that Olive Blakeney's part is rather colourless, and that the amusing final line is liable to be lost through members of the audience beginning to leave their seats when the film is obviously ending. Cheerful entertainment for everyone except the most rigid of highbrows."

The Daily Film Renter wrote: "Amusing comedy starring Seymour Hicks in original stage role of wealthy pickle magnate who loses memory in train smash, assumes new identity and becomes fashionable hairdresser. Star's diverting performance is highlight of film that offers abundant laughs, some of which spring from slightly risqué dialogue. Fade-out offers delightful spectacle of hero, his memory regained, purposely feigning further mental lapse as solution to problems his absence has precipitated. Developed on stage lines, subject represents very good entertainment for popular halls."

Kine Weekly wrote: "Snappy farcical comedy, the story of which approaches the loss of memory theme trom a piquant angle. Seymour Hicks, who scored so brillantly in the stage success from which it is adapted repeats his clever performance, and it is to his consummate genius, versatility and eager buoyancy that the film owes much of its wit and sparkling humour."

Picturegoer wrote: "There is a touch of piquancy about the proceedings which Seymour Hicks knows well how to deal with, and of which he makes the most. He is well supported by his 'wives,' who are cleverly contrasted by Olive Blakeney and Enid Stamp-Taylor respectively."

Picture Show wrote: "Farce comedy In which a pickle millionaire becomes beauty expert and marries a second wife after losing his memory through a train smash. The many complications which follow are most amusing. Seymour Hicks as Alfred Henfield, the unfortunate magnate, gives an uproariously funny portrayal of the role. Enid Stamp-Taylor as the original wife is good. Olive Blakeney as the 'second' wife plays the part with confidence, and Garry Marsh as the 'second husband' of the pickle magnate's 'first wife' plays the part with vigour. A most entertaining picture."
