= Katherine Locke =

American actress (1910-1995)

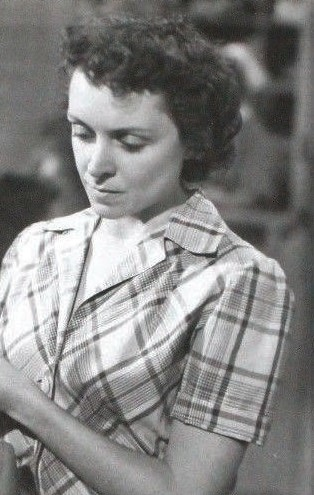
- Katherine Locke in The Snake Pit
- Born: June 24, 1910; Kalinkavičy, Minsk Governorate, Russian Empire (now Kalinkavichy, Belarus)
- Died: September 12, 1995 (aged 85); Los Angeles, California, U.S.
- Occupation: Actress
- Years active: 1936–1958
- Spouse: Norman Corwin (m. 1947)
- Children: 2

Katherine Locke (June 24, 1910 – September 12, 1995) was a Broadway actress in the late 1930s.

== Early life ==
She was born in Kalinkavičy (now Kalinkavichy, Belarus) and raised in the United States. Her father, Morris Locke (né Mendel Lakomowitz), was a Hebrew teacher and amateur writer. She was trained as a pianist but chose instead to become an actress.

== Career ==
Locke was a concert pianist at the beginning of her career.

After appearing in small roles, at one time as an off-stage barking dog, her career was established by appearing in the 1937 Broadway play Having Wonderful Time, co-starring with John Garfield. She appeared in films in the 1940s and 1950s as a supporting actress. She began her film work in the late 1930s in bit parts, but she is remembered today as a stage actress. In addition to appearing on a successful Broadway production of Hamlet playing Ophelia, her stage credits include starring with John Garfield in Having a Wonderful Time, Fifth Column with Lee J. Cobb, and Clash by Night with Tallulah Bankhead.

== Personal life ==
Locke married radio writer Norman Corwin in Maryland in March 1947. The couple had two children.

== Filmography ==
Year	Title	Role	Notes
1936	Straight from the Shoulder	Gail Pyne	
1944	Wilson	Helen Bones	
1944	The Seventh Cross	Mrs. Sauer	
1948	The Snake Pit	Margaret	
1950	The Sound of Fury	Hazel	
1951	People Will Talk	Miss James	
1952	Flesh and Fury	Mrs. Hollis	
1952	The Unexpected	Woman	Episode: "One for the Money"
1958	A Certain Smile	Mme. Vallon	
