= Adventure in Washington =

1941 film directed by Alfred Edward Green

- Directed by: Alfred E. Green
- Written by: Jeanne Spencer; Albert Benham
- Screenplay by: Arthur Caesar; Lewis R. Foster
- Produced by: Charles R. Rogers
- Starring: Herbert Marshall; Virginia Bruce; Gene Reynolds
- Cinematography: Henry Sharp; Allen G. Siegler
- Edited by: James Sweeney
- Music by: W. Franke Harling
- Production company: Columbia Pictures
- Distributed by: Columbia Pictures
- Release date: May 30, 1941
- Running time: 84 minutes
- Country: United States
- Language: English

Adventure in Washington is a 1941 American drama film directed by Alfred E. Green and starring Herbert Marshall, Virginia Bruce and Gene Reynolds. The plot is about an unlikely U.S. Senate page boy whose misadventures in Washington, D.C., cause a Congressional scandal.

Based on a story by Jeanne Spencer and Albert Benham, the film was originally conceived in 1940 as a sequel to Columbia Pictures' hit film of the previous year set in the United States Senate, Mr. Smith Goes to Washington, with Mickey Rooney in mind for the part of a juvenile delinquent who becomes a Senate page.

Gene Reynolds eventually got the role of the page when filming began in 1941. Virginia Bruce plays a female radio reporter covering the Capitol Hill beat, who fights for acceptance as a legitimate journalist in a male-dominated arena. Herbert Marshall's character as a prominent Senator eventually comes to appreciate her insights into human nature as well as her skill and they become close friends.

The film's sets designed by art director Lionel Banks were acclaimed for their attention to detail. It was released in Britain under the alternative title of Female Correspondent.

== Plot ==
Jim O'Brien (J. M. Kerrigan), an old friend of highly regarded U.S. Senator John Coleridge (Herbert Marshall), prevails upon the Senator to take under his wing a streetwise orphaned delinquent, teenager Marty Driscoll (Gene Reynolds), and appoint the youth as a Senate page boy. Because the boy's father had once helped Coleridge get his start in politics, the Senator reluctantly agrees.

Driscoll continues to be a troublemaker as a Senate page, acting as a smart-aleck around the other pages and in their school classes. He resents having to wear the knickers required as part of the Senate pages' uniform at the time, contending "I gave up short pants years ago". Told that it's a Senate tradition, he says, "I always thought knickers was for kids" (a scene depicted in the movie poster). He even gets into a fistfight with another page on the Senate floor (when the Senate is not in session) over a harmless initiation prank the other boys had played on him, resulting in a scolding by senior page Collins (Charles Smith) for his disgraceful behavior. Driscoll's attitude improves markedly, however, when he is befriended at a bowling alley by female radio commentator Jane Scott (Virginia Bruce), who counsels him to take advantage of the privileged opportunity he has been given as a Senate page.

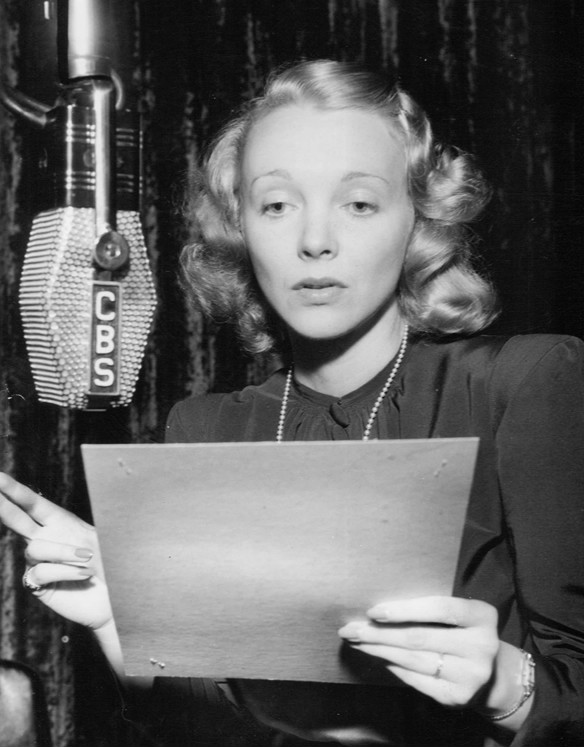
Virginia Bruce ("Jane Scott")

Despite his reformed behavior, Driscoll is later wrongly accused by page headmaster Bundy (Vaughan Glaser) of eavesdropping on a private meeting of Senators and leaking confidential information. As a result, he is dismissed as a page by Coleridge, who disbelieves his protegé's tearful protestations of innocence. Distraught at being unjustly terminated, Driscoll decides to get his revenge by turning over privileged information about an upcoming major defense appropriation bill being considered by Coleridge's committee to businessman Frank Conroy (Pierre Watkin). The unscrupulous stock trader gives Driscoll a bribe for this inside information. When the confidential bill's provisions are subsequently publicized and the stock prices of certain defense-related companies soar, the resulting uproar embroils Sen. Coleridge in controversy and he is investigated by his Senate colleagues for sharing nonpublic information with investors, a violation of Federal law.

When Driscoll learns that his misconduct has landed his mentor in serious trouble, he is conscience-stricken and hitchhikes back to Washington, where he bursts into the investigating committee's hearing room to explain that he alone is to blame for the scandal. Although his full confession exonerates Coleridge, there remains the issue of what to do about Conroy's illegal conduct and Driscoll's complicity. The committee votes to indict Conroy and, at the urging of Coleridge, agrees to allow Driscoll's fate to be decided by his fellow pages. Meeting in the empty Senate chambers, one of the pages calls for his dismissal as unfit to be a page. But another page, Abbott (Dickie Jones, who also played a page in Mr. Smith Goes to Washington), comes to his defense, pointing out that, unlike themselves who came from privileged backgrounds with loving parents who set a good example, Driscoll's lack of these advantages and his voluntary confession should be taken into consideration.

After the pages decide that Driscoll may continue as one of their own, the film's final scene concludes as he rises to express his gratitude for their forgiveness. The erstwhile delinquent gives a tearful peroration, saying he's learned from those he's met there how to be an upstanding citizen, and especially that American representative democracy is government "of the people, by the people, for the people", as he recites from memory The American's Creed.

== Main cast ==
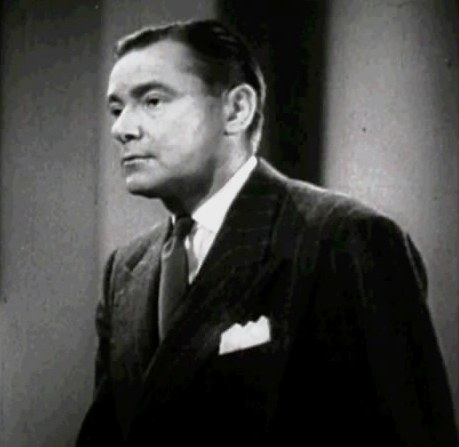
Herbert Marshall ("Senator Coleridge")

- Herbert Marshall as Sen. John Coleridge
- Virginia Bruce as Jane Scott
- Gene Reynolds as Marty Driscoll
- Samuel S. Hinds as Sen. Henry Owen
- Ralph Morgan as Sen. Cummings
- Vaughan Glaser as Bundy
- Charles Smith as Collins
- Dickie Jones as Abbott
- Pierre Watkin as Frank Conroy
- J. M. Kerrigan as Jim O'Brien
- Tommy Bond as Peewee Haynes
- Bess Flowers as Mrs. Arno (uncredited)
- Ian Wolfe as Emerson (uncredited)
- Billy Dawson as Chubby Wells
- Charles Lind as Lenny Root
- Mary Currier as Miss Nolan

== Production ==
The film was originally conceived in 1940 with Mickey Rooney in mind, as a sequel to Columbia Pictures' hit film of the previous year, Mr. Smith Goes to Washington. The Senate gave permission for its pages to travel to Hollywood for filming in the summer of 1940, but those plans fell through as World War II engulfed Europe. After Mickey Rooney turned down the role of Marty Driscoll, 17-year old Gene Reynolds was cast for the part by the time shooting began on February 12, 1941.

Considerable attention was paid to authentic set design for the Senate chamber, including accurate reproduction of the Senators' desks and other furnishings, down to the snuff boxes at the Vice President's rostrum.

Female lead Virginia Bruce prepared for her role as a radio commentator by practicing the delivery style of fast-talking radio personality Floyd Gibbons. For the bowling sequence, she spent two days in a bowling alley rehearsing and shooting the scene, using a special, lightweight ball made of balsa wood.

Filming wrapped on March 24, 1941. Adventure in Washington was released on Memorial Day, May 30, 1941.

== Critical response ==
Not all members of Congress were pleased with the film's depiction of life on Capitol Hill, especially its scenes of fistfights and eavesdropping by pages. Congressman Donald McLean (R-NJ), in a speech in the U.S. House of Representatives, denounced the film's portrayal of things that didn't happen in real life. Having once been a Senate page himself 40 years before, he said it "undermine[d] the confidence of the electorate". International distribution of the film was not allowed by the Office of Censorship because of concerns that the storyline's portrayal of the bribing of a Senate page would "hinder the war effort".

The Ames (Iowa) Daily Tribune praised the cast's performances and the film's relevance about defense spending "at a time when the eyes of the nation are centered on defense", as WWII raged in Europe and tensions were rising between the U.S. and Japan. The newspaper lauded the cast as "splendid ... [having] roles calling for the utmost in their not inconsiderable talents". Actors Herbert Marshall and Gene Reynolds ("a new boy star") "possess roles of exceptional merit and provide performances to match", and Virginia Bruce gave a "memorable characterization" of the assertive reporter, the review said. The Jackson Sun gave a glowing review, saying that Marshall portrayed his Senator character as "both dignified and human" and Roynolds was "splendid". Bruce was singled out for praise, for her "wise-cracking role ... faintly satiric" of some radio reporters.

The Atlanta Constitution in a June 1, 1941, review called Adventure in Washington "thrilling" and complimented the production for the extent of detail in the sets representing the Senate chamber and page classrooms, down to the desks "and even the snuff boxes at the rostrum".

IMDb gives the film an aggregate score of 6.8/10, as of July 24, 2018.

== Home media ==
Adventure in Washington was released on DVD by Sony Pictures Home Entertainment as part of Sony's Choice Collection in 2013.
