= Aleen Leslie =

American screenwriter

- Born: Aleen Wetstein; February 5, 1908; Pittsburgh, Pennsylvania, U.S.
- Died: February 2, 2010 (aged 101); Beverly Hills, California, U.S.
- Education: Ohio State University
- Occupations: Screenwriter, playwright, novelist
- Spouse: Jacques Leslie (d. 1974)
- Children: Diane Leslie, Jacques Leslie
- Writing career
- Period: 1940–56

Aleen Leslie (née Wetstein; February 5, 1908 – February 2, 2010) was a screenwriter, playwright, and novelist. She died in 2010, at age 101. At that time, she was the oldest member of the Writers Guild of American-West. She is perhaps best known for the A Date with Judy media franchise. Leslie was also the author of the novels The Scent of the Roses and The Windfall, and wrote various plays for the Pasadena Playhouse.

== Biography ==
Aleen Wetstein was born in Pittsburgh, Pennsylvania, and was the daughter of Nat Wetstein (a traveling salesman) and Eugenie Mandel (a dressmaker). She began attending Ohio State University, but dropped out during the Great Depression. After becoming secretary of the Association Against the Prohibition Amendment, she began writing a weekly column called "One Girl Chorus" for The Pittsburgh Press. The column was eventually adapted by Wetstein and Jerome Lawrence as a radio domestic comedy titled A Date with Judy, which she adapted and exploited across all entertainment forms possible at that time, including theatre, film, television, and comic books.

Wetstein moved permanently to Hollywood in the late 1930s, and by 1938, she had talked her way into a job at Columbia Pictures. Her first screen credit was a Charley Chase comedy short, The Nightshirt Bandit (1938). She wrote stories and screenplays for Columbia features through 1941, returning to the studio briefly in 1949.

She married Jacques Leslie and in 1941 she began using her married name on scripts. Based on her success with A Date with Judy, she built a career writing teen-driven entertainment like Henry Aldrich Gets Glamour and Father Was a Fullback. In 1938 she had submitted a story to Universal Pictures as a possible vehicle for Deanna Durbin; it was accepted but shelved, and was finally filmed in 1942 as a vehicle for Gloria Jean, It Comes Up Love (released 1943).

Her last screen credit was Pardon My Nightshirt (1956), an Andy Clyde short based on the 1938 script The Nightshirt Bandit signed Aleen Wetstein; she did not participate in the rewrite, and was credited for the original story as Aleen Leslie.

== Selected filmography ==
- The Nightshirt Bandit (short, 1938)
- The Doctor Takes a Wife (1940)
- Affectionately Yours (1941)
- The Stork Pays Off (1941)
- It Comes Up Love (1943)
- Henry Aldrich Gets Glamour (1943)
- Henry Aldrich Plays Cupid (1944)
- Henry Aldrich's Little Secret (1944)
- Rosie the Riveter (1944)
- A Date with Judy (1948)
- Father Was a Fullback (1949)
- Father Is a Bachelor (1950)
- The Living North (1956)
- Pardon My Nightshirt (short, 1956)
