= The Last Train from Madrid =

1937 film by James P. Hogan

- Directed by: James P. Hogan
- Screenplay by: Louis Stevens; Robert Wyler
- Based on: Paul Hervey Fox; Elsie Fox
- Produced by: George M. Arthur; Hugh Bennett
- Starring: Dorothy Lamour; Lew Ayres; Gilbert Roland
- Cinematography: Harry Fischbeck
- Edited by: Everett Douglas
- Production company: Paramount Pictures
- Distributed by: Paramount Pictures
- Release date: November 6, 1937
- Running time: 85 minutes
- Country: United States
- Language: English

The Last Train from Madrid is a 1937 American war drama film directed by James P. Hogan and starring Dorothy Lamour, Lew Ayres and Gilbert Roland. It is set during the Spanish Civil War. The film was one of the few contemporary Hollywood films made about the war.

== Plot ==
The plot revolves around the story of seven peoples' lives and love affairs in Madrid during the Spanish Civil War. The film is set during one day, a train leaving from Madrid to Valencia being bound to leave at midnight, allowing the protagonists, including prisoners who agreed to fight in exchange for their release, to escape the city under intense bombing.

== Cast ==
- Dorothy Lamour as Carmelita Castillo
- Lew Ayres as Bill Dexter
- Gilbert Roland as Eduardo de Soto
- Karen Morley as Helene Rafitto
- Lionel Atwill as Colonel Vigo
- Helen Mack as Lola
- Robert Cummings as Juan Ramos
- Olympe Bradna as Maria Ronda
- Anthony Quinn as Captain Ricardo Alvarez
- Lee Bowman as Michael Balk
- Francis Ford as Pedro Elias
- Alan Ladd as Soldier
- Evelyn Brent as Woman soldier
- Jack Perrin as Guard
- Robert Emmett O'Connor as Secret Service Man
- Louis Natheaux as Headwaiter
- Rollo Lloyd as Hernandez
- Nigel De Brulier as Philosopher
- Gordon De Main as Gonzalez
- Louise Carter as Rosa Delgado
- Maurice Cass as Waiter
- Hooper Atchley as Martin
- Francis McDonald as Mora
- George MacQuarrie as Driver
- Carl Harbaugh as Militiaman
- Otto Hoffman as Fernando
- Stanley Fields as Avila

== Production ==
In 1936, it was reported that Paramount had acquired the property as a vehicle for Cary Grant. However, Grant did not sign a new contract and left the studio later that year.

As with Love Under Fire, another film about the Spanish Civil War in production at the time, the filmmakers were careful not to take sides. Paramount executives described it as a "sort of a Grand Hotel theme." The production experienced several issues with the Hays Office because of the political aspects of the subject.

Filming took place in April and May 1937, mainly at Paramount's studios and at the Iverson Ranch, although some secondary location shooting took place in Palencia in Castille. The sets were designed by the art directors Earl Hedrick and Hans Dreier. Additional filming of background scenes took place at Cecil B. DeMille ’Spanish’ bungalow on the Paramount lot; DeMille himself appears in a crowd scene in the film.

== Reception ==
Writing for Night and Day magazine in 1937, Graham Greene offered an unfavorable review, describing The Last Train from Madrid as "probably the worst film of the decade." Greene criticized the film's acting and noted that rather than experiencing the dialogue's intended "emotional and uplifting" message, he found it humorous.

The New York Times suggested that the film should not be seriously regarded: "True, it treats of the Spanish Revolution, but merely as Hollywood has in the past regarded the turmoils of Ruritania and Zenda."

== Bibliography ==
- Schindler, Colin. Hollywood in Crisis: Cinema and American Society 1929-1939. Routledge, 2005.
- Kear, Lynn & King, James. Evelyn Brent: The Life and Films of Hollywood's Lady Crook. McFarland & Co, 2009.
