= Henry Aldrich for President =

1941 film

- Directed by: Hugh Bennett
- Screenplay by: Val Burton
- Produced by: Sol C. Siegel
- Starring: Jimmy Lydon; June Preisser; Mary Anderson; Charles Smith; John Litel; Dorothy Peterson; Martha O'Driscoll
- Cinematography: John J. Mescall
- Edited by: Thomas Neff
- Music by: Walter Scharf
- Production company: Paramount Pictures
- Distributed by: Paramount Pictures
- Release date: October 24, 1941
- Running time: 75 minutes
- Country: United States
- Language: English

Henry Aldrich for President is a 1941 American comedy film directed by Hugh Bennett and written by Val Burton. The film stars Jimmy Lydon, June Preisser, Mary Anderson, Charles Smith, John Litel, Dorothy Peterson and Martha O'Driscoll. The film was released on October 24, 1941, by Paramount Pictures.

== Synopsis ==
Complications arise when Henry (James Lydon) runs for Centerville High School Students Body President.

== Cast ==
- Jimmy Lydon as Henry Aldrich
- June Preisser as Geraldine Adams
- Mary Anderson as Phyllis Michael
- Charles Smith as Dizzy Stevens
- John Litel as Mr. Aldrich
- Dorothy Peterson as Mrs. Aldrich
- Martha O'Driscoll as Mary Aldrich
- Vaughan Glaser as Mr. Bradley
- Rod Cameron as Ed Calkins
- Kenneth Howell as Irwin Barrett
- Lucien Littlefield as Mr. Crosley
- Irving Bacon as Mr. McCloskey
- Frank Coghlan Jr. as Marvin Bagshaw
- Buddy Pepper as Johnny
- Dick Paxton as Red MacGowan
- Lillian Yarbo as Lucinda
- Arthur Loft as Department of Commerce Inspector
- Sidney Miller as Sidney

== Bibliography ==
- Fetrow, Alan G. Feature Films, 1940-1949: a United States Filmography. McFarland, 1994.
