= Hugh Bennett (film director) =

American film director (1892–1950)

- Born: August 22, 1892; New York City
- Died: March 21, 1950 (aged 57); Malibu, California, United States
- Occupations: Director, editor
- Years active: 1926–1950 (film)

Hugh Bennett (1892–1950) was an American film director and film editor. He directed a number of entries in the Henry Aldrich series of films for Paramount Pictures.

== Filmography ==
=== Editor ===
- Just Another Blonde (1926)
- Subway Sadie (1926)
- The Patent Leather Kid (1927)
- An Affair of the Follies (1927)
- The Shepherd of the Hills (1928)
- The Little Shepherd of Kingdom Come (1928)
- Outcast (1928)
- The Divine Lady (1929)
- Saturday's Children (1929)
- Arrowsmith (1931)
- Street Scene (1931)
- Cynara (1932)
- Secrets (1933)
- The Way to Love (1933)
- Bolero (1934)
- She Loves Me Not (1934)
- Mrs. Wiggs of the Cabbage Patch (1934)
- The Glass Key (1935)
- Coronado (1935)
- And Sudden Death (1936)
- Rose of the Rancho (1936)
- Lady Be Careful (1936)
- Maid of Salem (1937)
- Wells Fargo (1937)
- If I Were King (1938)
- Her Jungle Love (1938)
- Cocoanut Grove (1938)
- The Night of Nights (1939)
- Grand Jury Secrets (1939)
- Persons in Hiding (1939)
- Our Leading Citizen (1939)
- The Great McGinty (1940)
- Rhythm on the River (1940)
- I Wanted Wings (1941)
- Champagne for Caesar (1950)

=== Director ===
- Henry Aldrich for President (1941)
- Henry Aldrich, Editor (1942)
- Henry and Dizzy (1942)
- Mardi Gras (1943)
- Henry Aldrich Gets Glamour (1943)
- Henry Aldrich Haunts a House (1943)
- Henry Aldrich Swings It (1943)
- Henry Aldrich, Boy Scout (1944)
- Henry Aldrich Plays Cupid (1944)
- Henry Aldrich's Little Secret (1944)
- The National Barn Dance (1944)

=== Producer ===
- The Last Train from Madrid (1937)

== Bibliography ==
- Drew, Bernard A. Motion Picture Series and Sequels: A Reference Guide. Routledge, 2013.
- Erickson, Hal. From Radio to the Big Screen: Hollywood Films Featuring Broadcast Personalities and Programs. McFarland, 2014.
