= Fay Courteney =

American actress (1878–1943)

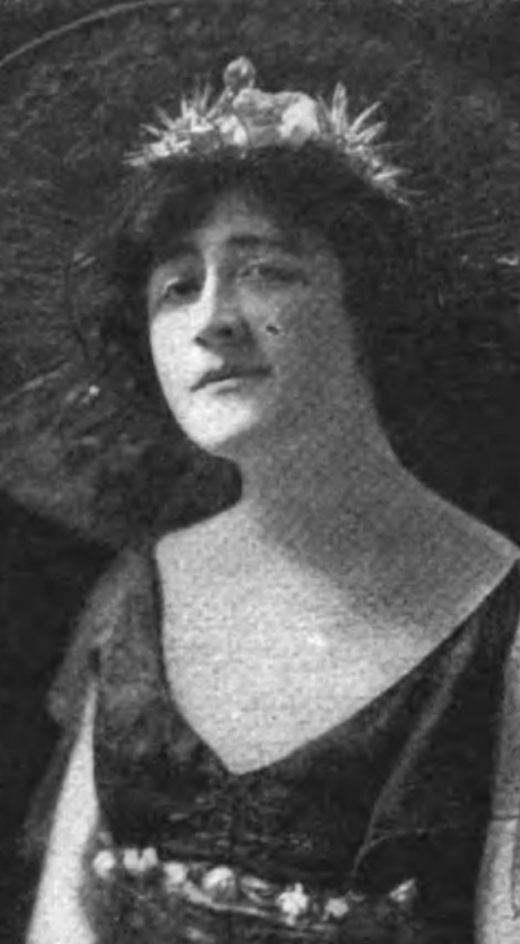
- Fay Courteney, from a 1917 publication.
- Born: Frances K. Courteney about 1878; San Francisco
- Died: July 18, 1943; New York City
- Other name: Frances Gamble
- Occupations: Actress, singer, vaudeville performer

Fay Courteney (about 1878 – July 18, 1943) was an American actress on stage and in radio.

== Early life ==
Frances K. Courteney was born in San Francisco, the daughter of Herbert Courteney and A. H. Courteney. Her father was a building contractor.

== Career ==
Courteney toured vaudeville in the Courteney Sisters, with her sister, and as a solo artist, with her "deep and voluminous" "organ-like contralto" voice. She was a fixture in stock companies in Cleveland, Columbus, Rochester, Detroit, and Toronto, and associated for many years with actor Vaughan Glaser. In 1920, she played the Alcazar Theatre in San Francisco, co-starring in Bought and Paid For and The Matinee Hero with Clay Clement, and in Happiness. Her Broadway credits included roles in the comedies The Advertising of Kate (1922), She Couldn't Say No (1926), It Never Rains (1929–1930), and Off to Buffalo (1939). Later in her career, she was active in radio productions.

== Personal life ==
Courteney, described as having "hypnotic eyes" and an "alluring manner", had "multitudes of suitors" as a young actress. She married Theodore L. Gamble in 1901 in New Jersey; they divorced in 1910. She enjoyed driving an automobile, and even raced her car on occasion. She died in New York City in 1943, in her sixties, from a cerebral hemorrhage.
