= Girl from Avenue A =

1940 film

- Film poster
- Directed by: Otto Brower
- Screenplay by: Frances Hyland (screenplay)
- Based on: The Brat, a 1917 play by Maude Fulton
- Starring: Jane Withers; Kent Taylor; Kay Aldridge; Elyse Knox; Laura Hope Crews; Jessie Ralph; Harry Shannon; Vaughan Glaser; Rand Brooks
- Distributed by: 20th Century Fox
- Release date: August 9, 1940
- Running time: 71 minutes
- Country: United States
- Language: English

Girl from Avenue A is a 1940 American comedy film, directed by Otto Brower. It stars Jane Withers, Kent Taylor, and Kay Aldridge.

== Cast ==
- Jane Withers as Jane
- Kent Taylor as MacMillan Forrester
- Kay Aldridge as Lucy
- Elyse Knox as Angela
- Laura Hope Crews as Mrs. Forrester
- Jessie Ralph as Mrs. Van Dyke
- Harry Shannon as Timson
- Ann Shoemaker as Mrs. Maddox
- Rand Brooks as Steve
- Vaughan Glaser as Bishop Phelps
- George Humbert as Sylvester Gallupi
