= John Litel =

American actor (1892–1972)

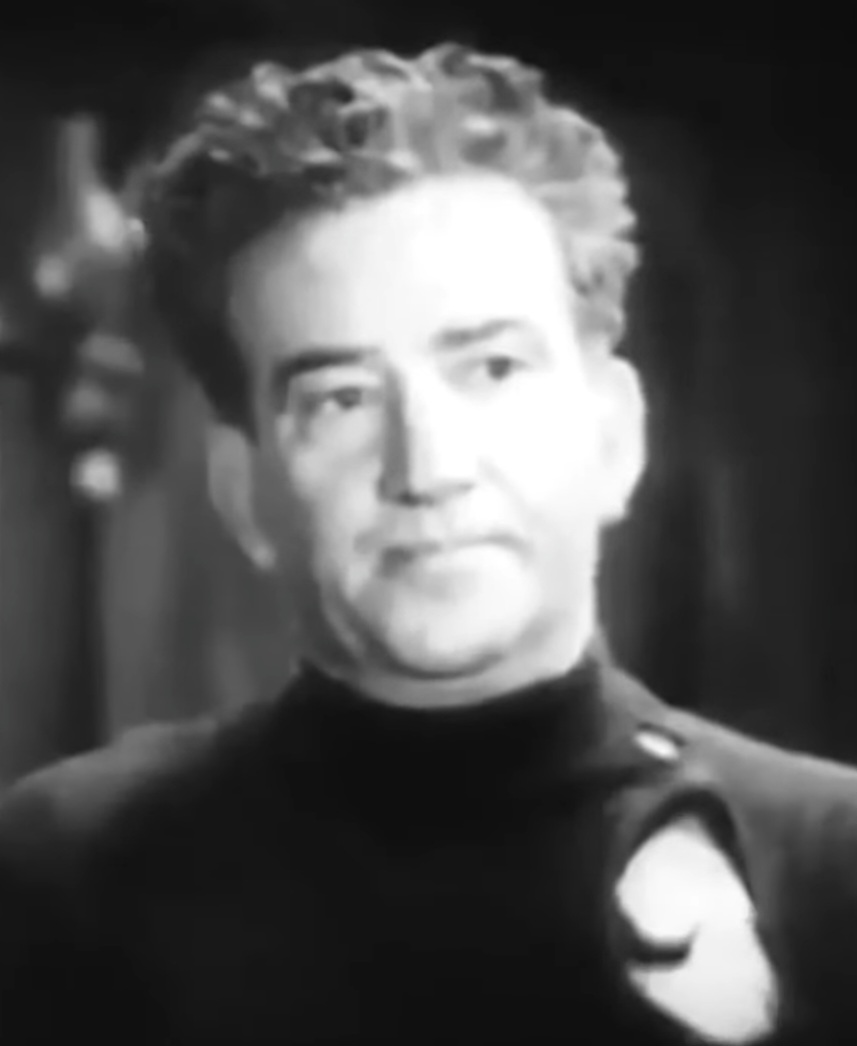
- Litel in Submarine Base (1943)
- Born: John Beach Litel; December 30, 1892; Albany, Wisconsin, U.S.
- Died: February 3, 1972 (aged 79); Woodland Hills, California, U.S.
- Occupation: Actor
- Years active: 1919–1967
- Spouse(s): Ruth Emilie Pecheur Litel (1920-1955) (her death) (Beatrice Marguerite Brush (1956-1972) (his death)

John Beach Litel (December 30, 1892 – February 3, 1972) was an American film and television actor.

== Early life ==
Litel was born in Albany, Wisconsin. During World War I, he enlisted in the French Army and was twice decorated for bravery. Back in the U.S. after the war, Litel enrolled in the American Academy of Dramatic Arts and began his stage career.

== Career ==
His Broadway credits include Sweet Aloes (1935), Hell Freezes Over (1935), Life's Too Short (1935), Strange Gods (1932), Before Morning (1932), Lilly Turner (1932), Ladies of Creation (1931), Back Seat Drivers (1928), The Half Naked Truth (1926), The Beaten Track (1925), Thoroughbreds (1924), and Irene (1919).

In 1929, he began appearing in films. Part of the "Warner Bros. Stock Company" beginning in the 1930s, he appeared in dozens of Warner Bros. films and was in over 200 films during his entire career. He often played supporting roles such as hard-nosed cops and district attorneys. He was Nancy Drew's (Bonita Granville) attorney father, Carson Drew, in four films in 1938 and 1939. Among his other films are They Drive by Night (1940); Knute Rockne, All American (1940); They Died with Their Boots On (1941); and Scaramouche (1952). His final film role was in Nevada Smith (1966).

In the second season of the Disney series Zorro, he played the governor of California in several episodes. During 1960 and 1961, he was seen as Dan Murchison in nine episodes of the ABC Western television series, Stagecoach West, starring Wayne Rogers and Robert Bray.

He appeared in many other series as well, including the role of Captain David Rowland in the episode "Don't Get Tough with a Sailor" on the ABC/Desilu Western series The Life and Legend of Wyatt Earp starring Hugh O'Brian. In the story line, Rowland, a former captain in the United States Navy, is a wealthy Arizona Territory rancher who operates his own law and private jail near the Mexican border.

Litel appeared in an episode of I Love Lucy, “Mr. and Mrs. T.V. Show”, airing November 1, 1954.

He appeared as Mr. Crenshaw in the episode "The Giant Killer" of the Western series Sugarfoot.

Litel also appeared as Bob Cummings's boss Mr. Thackery in the TV series The Bob Cummings Show in the early/mid-1950s. Cummings played Robert S. Beanblossom on the show.

== Death ==
Litel died at the Motion Picture & Television Country House and Hospital in Woodland Hills, Los Angeles in 1972.

== Selected filmography ==
1. Always Faithful (1929, Short) as Wayne
2. On the Border (1930) as Dave
3. Wayward (1932) as Robert 'Bob' Daniels
4. Fugitive in the Sky (1936) as Mike Phelan - aka Roger Johnson
5. Give Me Liberty (1936, Short) as Patrick Henry
6. Black Legion (1937) as Tommy Smith
7. Midnight Court (1937) as Victor Shanley
8. Marked Woman (1937) as Gordon
9. Slim (1937) as Wyatt Ranstead
10. The Life of Emile Zola (1937) as Charpentier
11. Back in Circulation (1937) as Dr. Eugene Forde
12. Alcatraz Island (1937) as Garrett Sloane aka 'Gat' Brady
13. The Man Without a Country (1937, Short) as Lt. Philip Nolan
14. Missing Witnesses (1937) as Inspector Robedrt L. Lane
15. Gold is Where You Find It (1938) as Ralph Ferris
16. A Slight Case of Murder (1938) as Post
17. Jezebel (1938) as Jean La Cour
18. Love, Honor and Behave (1938) as Jim Blake
19. Over the Wall (1938) as Father Neil Connor
20. Little Miss Thoroughbred (1938) as Nelson 'Nails' Morgan
21. My Bill (1938) as John Rudlin
22. The Amazing Dr. Clitterhouse (1938) as Mr. Monroe, the prosecuting attorney
23. Valley of the Giants (1938) as Hendricks
24. Broadway Musketeers (1938) as Stanley 'Stan' Dowling
25. Nancy Drew... Detective (1938) as Carson Drew
26. Declaration of Independence (1938, Short) as Thomas Jefferson
27. Comet Over Broadway (1938) as Bill Appleton
28. Wings of the Navy (1939) as Commander Clark
29. Nancy Drew... Reporter (1939) as Carson Drew
30. Secret Service of the Air (1939) as Saxby
31. You Can't Get Away with Murder (1939) as Attorney Carey
32. Dodge City (1939) as Matt Cole
33. On Trial (1939) as Robert Strickland
34. Nancy Drew... Trouble Shooter (1939) as Carson Drew
35. Nancy Drew and the Hidden Staircase (1939) as Carson Drew
36. Dust Be My Destiny (1939) as Prosecutor
37. On Dress Parade (1939) as Col. Michael Riker
38. One Hour to Live (1939) as Rudolph Spain
39. The Return of Doctor X (1939) as Dr. Francis Flegg
40. A Child Is Born (1939) as Dr. Brett
41. The Fighting 69th (1940) as Capt. Mangan
42. Castle on the Hudson (1940) as Chaplain
43. Virginia City (1940) as Thomas Marshall
44. It All Came True (1940) as "Doc" Roberts
45. An Angel from Texas (1940) as Quigley
46. Flight Angels (1940) as Dr. Barclay
47. Men Without Souls (1940) as Reverend Thomas Storm
48. Murder in the Air (1940) as Saxby
49. Gambling on the High Seas (1940) as U.S. District Attorney
50. The Man Who Talked Too Much (1940) as District Attorney Dickson
51. They Drive by Night (1940) as Harry McNamara
52. Money and the Woman (1940) as Jerremy 'Jerry ' Helm, Bank Manager
53. Knute Rockne, All American (1940) as Committee Chairman
54. Father is a Prince (1940) as Dr. Mark Stone
55. Lady with Red Hair (1940) as Charles Bryant
56. Santa Fe Trail (1940) as Martin
57. Father's Son (1941) as William Emory
58. The Trial of Mary Dugan (1941) as Mr. West
59. The Great Mr. Nobody (1941) as John Wade
60. The Big Boss (1941) as Bob Dugan
61. Thieves Fall Out (1941) as Tim Gordon
62. Henry Aldrich for President (1941) as Mr. Aldrich
63. They Died with Their Boots On (1941) as General Phil Sheridan
64. Sealed Lips (1942) as Fred M. Morton / Mike Rofano
65. Don Winslow of the Navy (1942) as Spencer Merlin
66. Kid Glove Killer (1942) as Matty
67. Mississippi Gambler (1942) as Jim Hadley aka Francis Carvel
68. The Mystery of Marie Roget (1942) as Beauvais
69. A Desperate Chance for Ellery Queen (1942) as Norman Hadley
70. Henry and Dizzy (1942) as Mr. Aldrich
71. Men of Texas (1942) as Colonel Colbert Scott
72. Invisible Agent (1942) as John Gardiner
73. Henry Aldrich, Editor (1942) as Mr. Sam Aldrich
74. The Boss of Big Town (1942) as Michael Lynn
75. Madame Spy (1942) as Peter Rolf
76. Murder in Times Square (1943) as Dr. Blaine
77. Henry Aldrich Gets Glamour (1943) as Mr. Sam Aldrich
78. Crime Doctor (1943) as Emilio Caspari
79. Henry Aldrich Swings It (1943) as Mr. Sam Aldrich
80. Submarine Base (1943) as James Xavier 'Jim' Taggart
81. So Proudly We Hail! (1943) as Dr. Harrison
82. Henry Aldrich Haunts a House (1943) as Mr. Sam Aldrich
83. Where Are Your Children? (1943) as Judge Edmonds
84. Henry Aldrich, Boy Scout (1944) as Mr. Sam Aldrich
85. Henry Aldrich Plays Cupid (1944) as Mr. Sam Aldrich
86. Henry Aldrich's Little Secret (1944) as Mr. Sam Aldrich
87. My Buddy (1944) as Father Jim Donnelly
88. Murder in the Blue Room (1944) as Frank Baldrich
89. Faces in the Fog (1944) as Dr. Mason
90. Lake Placid Serenade (1944) as Walter Benda
91. Brewster's Millions (1945) as Swearengen Jones
92. Salome, Where She Danced (1945) as Gen. Lee
93. Crime Doctor's Warning (1945) as Inspector Dawes
94. The Crimson Canary (1945) as Roger Quinn
95. Northwest Trail (1945) as Sergeant Means
96. The Daltons Ride Again (1945) as Mitchael J. 'Mike' Bohannon
97. The Enchanted Forest (1945) as Ed Henderson
98. San Antonio (1945) as Charlie Bell
99. The Madonna's Secret (1946) as Police Lt. Roberts
100. Smooth as Silk (1946) as Stephen Elliott
101. Night in Paradise (1946) as Archon
102. She Wrote the Book (1946) as Dean Fowler
103. The Return of Rusty (1946) as Hugh Mitchell
104. Sister Kenny (1946) as Medical Director
105. Swell Guy (1946) as Arthur Tyler
106. Lighthouse (1947) as Hank Armitage
107. Easy Come, Easy Go (1947) as Tom Clancy
108. The Beginning or the End (1947) as K.T. Keller
109. The Guilty (1947) as Alex Tremholt
110. Heaven Only Knows (1947) as Reverend Wainwright
111. Christmas Eve (1947) as Joe Bland, FBI Agent
112. Cass Timberlane (1947) as Webb Wargate
113. My Dog Rusty (1948) as Hugh Mitchell
114. Smart Woman (1948) as Clark
115. I, Jane Doe (1948) as Horton
116. Key Largo (1948) as Dispatcher (uncredited)
117. Pitfall (1948) as District Attorney
118. Triple Threat (1948) as Coach Snyder
119. Rusty Leads the Way (1948) as Hugh Mitchell
120. The Valiant Hombre (1948) as Lon Lansdell
121. Rusty Saves a Life (1949) as Hugh Mitchell
122. Shamrock Hill (1949) as Ralph Judson
123. Outpost in Morocco (1949) as Col. Pascal
124. The Gal Who Took the West (1949) as Colonel Logan
125. Rusty's Birthday (1949) as Hugh Mitchell
126. Mary Ryan, Detective (1949) as Police Captain Billings
127. The Sundowners (1950) as John Gall
128. Woman in Hiding (1950) as John Chandler
129. Kiss Tomorrow Goodbye (1950) as Police Chief Sam Tolgate
130. The Fuller Brush Girl (1950) as Mr. Watkins
131. Cuban Fireball (1951) as Pomeroy Sr.
132. The Groom Wore Spurs (1951) as Uncle George
133. The Texas Rangers (1951) as Texas Ranger Major John B. Jones
134. Take Care of My Little Girl (1951) as John Erickson (uncredited)
135. Little Egypt (1951) as Shuster
136. Two-Dollar Bettor (1951) as John Hewitt
137. Flight to Mars (1951) as Dr. Lane
138. Jet Job (1952) as Sam Bentley
139. Scaramouche (1952) as Dr. Dubuque
140. Montana Belle (1952) as Matt Towner
141. Jack Slade (1953) as Judge Davidson
142. Sitting Bull (1954) as Gen. Wilford Howell
143. Double Jeopardy (1955) as Emmett Devery
144. The Kentuckian (1955) as Pleasant Tuesday Babson
145. Texas Lady (1955) as Meade Moore
146. The Wild Dakotas (1956) as Morgan Wheeler
147. Comanche (1956) as Gen. Nelson A. Miles
148. Runaway Daughters (1956) as George Barton
149. The Hired Gun (1957) as Mace Beldon
150. Decision at Sundown (1957) as Charles Summerton
151. Houseboat (1958) as Mr. William Farnsworth
152. The Restless Gun (1958) Episode "A Bell for Santo Domingo"
153. Voyage to the Bottom of the Sea (1961) as Vice-Adm. B.J. Crawford
154. Pocketful of Miracles (1961) as Police Inspector McCrary
155. Lover Come Back (1961) as Williams, Ad Council Board Member (uncredited)
156. The Gun Hawk (1963) as Drunk - Madden's father
157. The Sons of Katie Elder (1965) as Minister
158. Nevada Smith (1966) as Doctor

== Selected television ==
Year	Title	Role	Notes
1955	Du Pont Cavalcade Theater	Dr. William D. Silkworth	Season 4 Episode 7 "One Day at a Time"
1958	Wanted Dead or Alive	Judge George Healy	Season, Episode "Sheriff of Red Rock"
1958	The Restless Gun		Season 1 finale "Gratitude"
1959	The Restless Gun	Mr. Carter	Episode "Incident at Bluefield"
1959	Wanted Dead or Alive	Asa Morgan	Season, Episode "The Corner"
1960	Wanted Dead or Alive	Clint Davis	Season 2, Episode 30 "The Inheritance"
1961	Have Gun - Will Travel	Sheriff John Armstedder	Episode "Ben Jalisco"
1961	Bonanza (TV Series)	Mayor George Goshen	Episode "The Tin Badge"
1961	Rawhide	Jim Rye	S3:E18, "Incident of the Running Iron"
