= David Holt (American actor) =

American actor (1927–2003)

David Jack Holt
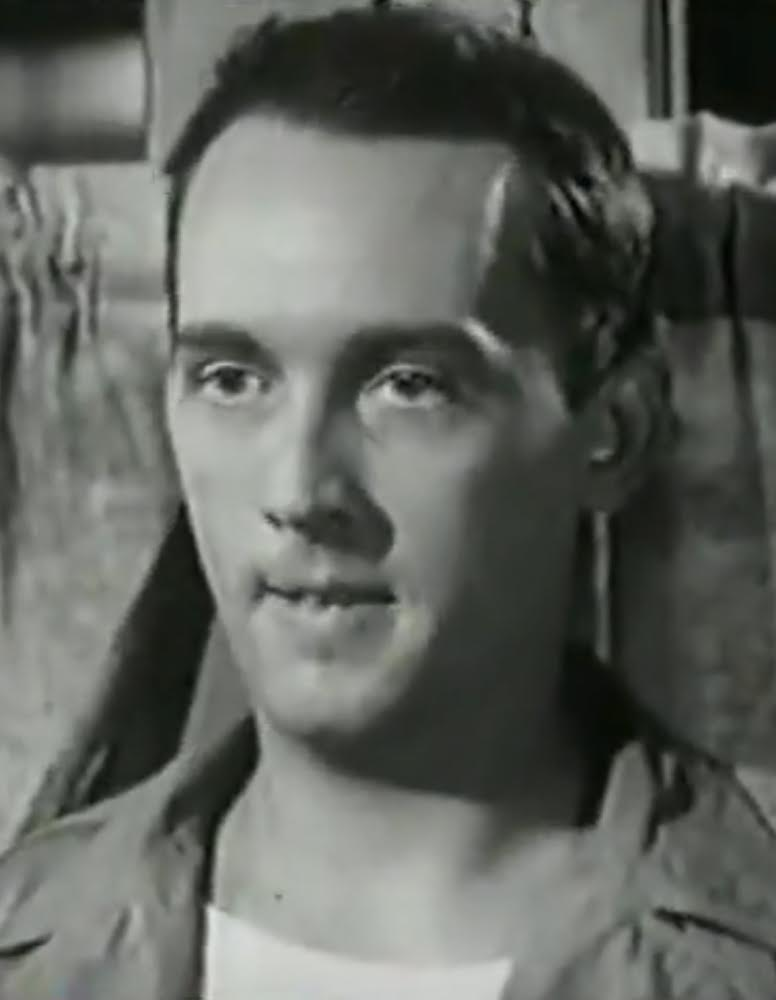
- Holt in the TV series Four Star Playhouse (1952)
- Born: August 14, 1927; Jacksonville, Florida, U.S.
- Died: November 15, 2003 (aged 76); San Juan Capistrano, California, U.S.
- Occupations: Actor; singer; dancer; songwriter
- Years active: 1933–1977
- Notable work: ▪ Sidney Sawyer in The Adventures of Tom Sawyer (1938) ▪ Billy (older) in The Pride of the Yankees (1942) ▪ Elizabeth Taylor's older brother in Courage of Lassie (1946)

David Jack Holt (August 14, 1927 – November 15, 2003) was an American actor initially groomed at the age of seven to be the "male Shirley Temple". After several supporting roles as a juvenile actor in films during the 1930s–1940s, he experienced family stress and left acting by the time he was 25. He subsequently had success as a songwriter before his death in 2003 at age 76.

== Early life ==
Holt was born August 14, 1927 in Jacksonville, Florida. His sister Betty, born four years later, also became an actor.

At a young age, Holt's dancing skills so impressed actor and wit Will Rogers that Rogers purportedly told Holt's mother if they were ever in Hollywood, they should contact him and he would get young David into the movies. Relying on this, Holt's father promptly quit his job with Ford Motors. The Holt family drove to California, intent on holding Rogers to his promise. However, despite their efforts, Rogers refused to see them.

With no income, Holt's father worked as a casual laborer. Holt's mother took her son to auditions, sometimes sharing transport with Shirley Temple and her mother. Initially, Holt found it difficult to get acting jobs. However, he did get a job as a "body double" for Cheeta's chimpanzee predecessor in the 1933 Tarzan the Fearless, and had a small role in the 1933 Our Gang (Little Rascals) comedy Forgotten Babies.

== Acting career ==
In 1934, the seven-year-old Holt got his acting break in You Belong to Me, a melodrama in which his character's parents die. He was now a child star, and Paramount Pictures put him under a long-term contract and promoted him as a male Shirley Temple. Holt made 20 films over the next six years, but did not come close to the superstar status experienced by his friend Shirley.

Holt was initially cast in the title role in David Copperfield co-starring with W. C. Fields, who portrayed Wilkins Micawber. However, producer David O. Selznick developed misgivings about having an American youngster portray a quintessentially British boy. When English child actor Freddie Bartholomew became available a couple of weeks into shooting, Holt was let go.

Holt had a prominent role in the 1936 movie Straight from the Shoulder (also known as Johnny Gets His Gun) alongside noted actor Ralph Bellamy. Unfortunately, Holt developed a reputation as a troublemaker and found himself settling for supporting roles in The Adventures of Tom Sawyer (1939), Beau Geste (1939), and Courage of Lassie (1946) as Elizabeth Taylor's older brother.

Holt's stress may have been one source of his troublemaking and his restricted success as an actor. He earned more than his father, who openly expressed his resentment; the production line of movies in which Holt was cast compounded his stress. Holt and his family's expenses soon exceeded his income, and the family had to rely on soup kitchens. At one point, Holt had polio, which he believed resulted from the stress he experienced in the studios. Complicating matters, Holt's parents eventually separated.

Holt may be best remembered as the older Billy in the critically and publicly acclaimed The Pride of the Yankees (1942) where the 14-year old attends Lou Gehrig Day and shows Lou Gehrig he can walk, implying that Gehrig's promised World Series home runs many years ago gave him the determination to overcome his childhood illness. In the poignant scene, Billy's eyes well with tears as the terminally ill ballplayer walks away. Author Richard Sandomir writes in his book about the movie's making that Holt cried when he was interviewed for the part by MGM studio mogul Samuel Goldwyn, explaining that he had suffered from polio himself.

In the 1944 film Henry Aldrich, Boy Scout, Holt played Irwin Barrett, an unscrupulous Senior Patrol Leader. His character sabotages a competing troop in a wilderness orienteering competition, almost costing Henry and another Scout their lives. As the dramatic rescue scene unfolds, a repentant Irwin confesses his misdeeds and helps save Henry and the other boy.

After outgrowing teenage roles, Holt starred in a 1949 B-movie melodrama about drug addiction, She Shoulda Said 'No'!. The following year, he had a prominent role as the kidnapped son of a prison warden in "Never Say Die", a 1950 episode of the Lone Ranger hit television series.

== Later work in music ==
By the early 1950s, acting parts had dried up and Holt turned to songwriting; he was also a successful jazz pianist. He composed music for numerous jazz albums, including several featuring Pete Jolly, and writing "The Christmas Blues" with Sammy Cahn, recorded by Dean Martin and eventually used on the 1997 soundtrack of L.A. Confidential. "The Christmas Blues" was also recorded by Bob Dylan on his 2009 album Christmas in the Heart.

== Personal life and death ==
Holt married and had four children: Lamont, Janna, Hayley, and Tina.

In the early 1960s, Holt went into the real estate business to take advantage of Southern California's booming real estate market and retired in 1985 at age 58.

Holt died at age 76 on November 15, 2003 of congestive heart failure in San Juan Capistrano, California, leaving his autobiography The Holts of Hollywood unfinished.

== Bibliography ==
- Holmstrom, John (1996). The Moving Picture Boy: An International Encyclopaedia from 1895 to 1995. Norwich, Michael Russell, p. 151.
- Best, Marc (1971). Those Endearing Young Charms: Child Performers of the Screen. South Brunswick and New York: Barnes & Co., p. 111-115.
- Willson, Dixie (1935). Little Hollywood Stars. Akron, OH, and New York: Saalfield Pub. Co.
