= Olive Blakeney =

American actress (1894–1959)

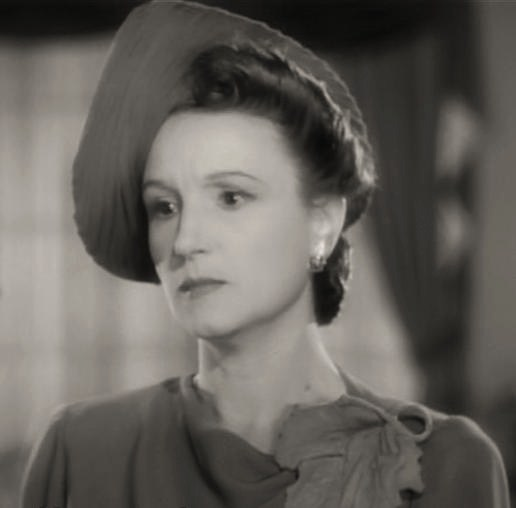
- Blakeney in That Uncertain Feeling (1941)
- Born: Olive Marie Blakeney; August 21, 1894; Bellevue, Kentucky, U.S.
- Died: October 21, 1959 (aged 65); Los Angeles, California, U.S.
- Education: Bellevue High School; Schuster-Martin School
- Occupation: Actress
- Years active: 1933–1959
- Spouse(s): John Wilmot Crosby (m. 1915; ?); Bernard Nedell (m. 1927)
- Children: 1

Olive Marie Blakeney (August 21, 1894 – October 21, 1959) was an American stage, screen and television actress.

== Early years ==
Born in Bellevue, Kentucky, Blakeley was the daughter of Emma (née Juell) and John W. Blakeney. She graduated from Bellevue High School, where her principal extracurricular activity appears to have been basketball, while primarily pursuing her theatrical studies across the Ohio River in Cincinnati; first at the Cincinnati School of Expression, and later at the Schuster-Martin School.

== Career ==
In the early 1910s, Blakeney acted with the Pittsfield (Massachusetts) Stock Company. Her work in the Empire Theater there in 1912 was her stage debut. In 1914, she was engaged with the Lucille La Verne stock theater company. After working as William Gaxton's partner in vaudeville, she acted on stage in England. While there, she helped to introduce the play Broadway to British audiences. Her Broadway credits include The Royal Family (1951) and The Browning Version / Harlequinade (1949).

Blakeney made her screen debut in England in 1932. She portrayed Mrs. Alice Aldrich, the mother of Henry Aldrich, in eight (seven of which were consecutive) films about The Aldrich Family. (She played a related role, Mary Aldrich, in a ninth related film, Henry and Dizzy.)

On television, she played the housekeeper in the syndicated medical drama Dr. Hudson's Secret Journal (1955–1956) and guest-starred in "The Mothers," a 1957 episode of the CBS situation comedy Mr. Adams and Eve, and "Mr. Tutt," also known as "Strange Counsel," a 1958 episode of Colgate Theatre.

== Personal life ==
In June 1915, Blakeney married John Wilmot Crosby of Pittsburgh, Pennsylvania, at St. Andrew's Episcopal Church in Fort Thomas, Kentucky).

In 1927, Blakeney married actor Bernard Nedell and they had a daughter, Betty Lou, later dubbed by the Associated Press, "the first American child baptized in St. George's Chapel at Windsor Castle and at the same font where King Charles II was christened".

On October 21, 1959, Blakeney died in Encino, California at the age of 65, due to complications of cancer. Her cremated remains are inurned together with those of her husband in the Great Mausoleum at Forest Lawn Memorial Park, Glendale, California.

== Partial filmography ==
- Her Imaginary Lover (1933) - Polly
- Give Her a Ring (1934) - Mrs. Brune
- Leave It to Blanche (1934) - Blanche Wetherby
- Mr. What's-His-Name? (1935) - Ann Henfield
- Hello, Sweetheart (1935) - Daisy Montrose
- Come Out of the Pantry (1935) - Mrs. Beach-Howard
- Excuse My Glove (1936) - Aunt Fanny Stafford
- Two's Company (1936) - Mrs. Madison
- Three Maxims (1936) - Mrs. Winston
- Don't Get Me Wrong (1937) - Frankie
- Gangway (1937) - Nedda Beaumont
- Third Finger, Left Hand (1940) - Louise (uncredited)
- That Uncertain Feeling (1941) - Margie
- Billy the Kid (1941) - Mrs. Patterson
- Dr. Kildare's Wedding Day (1941) - Mrs. Worth (uncredited)
- Two-Faced Woman (1941) - Phyllis (uncredited)
- Glamour Boy (1941) - Miss Treat
- Henry and Dizzy (1942) - Mrs. Aldrich
- Are Husbands Necessary? (1942) - Miss Bumstead
- The Postman Didn't Ring (1942) - Secretary (uncredited)
- Henry Aldrich, Editor (1942) - Mrs. Alice Aldrich
- Random Harvest (1942) - Miss Barnes (uncredited)
- Aerial Gunner (1943) - Mrs. Sanford Lunt
- Henry Aldrich Gets Glamour (1943) - Mrs. Alice Aldrich
- Henry Aldrich Swings It (1943) - Mrs. Alice Aldrich
- Henry Aldrich Haunts a House (1943) - Mrs. Alice Aldrich
- Henry Aldrich, Boy Scout (1944) - Mrs. Alice Aldrich
- The Navy Way (1944) - Mrs. Will Jamison (uncredited)
- Henry Aldrich Plays Cupid (1944) - Mrs. Alice Aldrich
- Henry Aldrich's Little Secret (1944) - Mrs. Alice Aldrich
- Allergic to Love (1944) - Mrs. Bradley
- The Port of 40 Thieves (1944) - Aunt Caroline Hubbard
- Experiment Perilous (1944) - Cissie
- Nob Hill (1945) - Carruthers' Housekeeper (uncredited)
- Dakota (1945) - Mrs. Stowe
- Leave Her to Heaven (1945) - Mrs. Louise Robie (uncredited)
- Sentimental Journey (1946) - Mrs. Deane (uncredited)
- The Strange Woman (1946) - Mrs. Hollis
- Time Out of Mind (1947) - Mrs. Fernald
- Sealed Verdict (1948) - Camilla Cameron
- Roogie's Bump (1954) - Mrs. Andrews
- Three Brave Men (1956) - Miss Victoria Scott
- Perry Mason (Episode "The Case of the Drowning Duck", 1957) - Mrs. Adams
- The Green-Eyed Blonde (1957) - Miss Vandingham
- I Want to Live! (1958) - Corona Warden (uncredited)
- Auntie Mame (1958) - Dowager (uncredited)
- Gunsmoke (Episode "SKY", 1959) - Ma Torvet
