= Jimmy Lydon =

American actor and television producer (1923–2022)

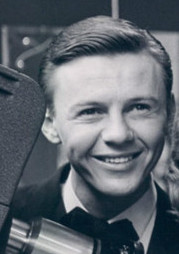
- Lydon in The First Hundred Years, 1951
- Born: May 30, 1923; Harrington Park, New Jersey, U.S.
- Died: March 9, 2022 (aged 98); San Diego, California, U.S.
- Occupations: Actor, producer
- Years active: 1937–1987
- Spouses: Patricia Pernetti (m. 1945, divorced) Betty Lou Nedell (m. 1952; died 2022)
- Children: 2

James Joseph Lydon (May 30, 1923 – March 9, 2022) was an American actor and television producer whose career in the entertainment industry began as a teenager during the 1930s.

== Early life ==
Lydon was born in Harrington Park, New Jersey, on May 30, 1923, the fifth of nine children. His family was of Irish heritage. He was raised in Bergenfield, New Jersey. He had six brothers and two sisters, and his father was a railroad statistician. After eight years at St. John's in Bergenfield, New Jersey, he studied photography at Professional Children's School in New York.

== Career ==
Before Lydon tried acting, he worked as a model for the Powers Agency for two years, appearing on magazine covers and in advertisements.

In 1932, Lydon's father, who was an alcoholic, decided to retire from working. This decision forced all of the other family members to seek employment in the depths of the Great Depression.

Lydon performed in two plays before he performed in his first film, Two Thoroughbreds (1939).

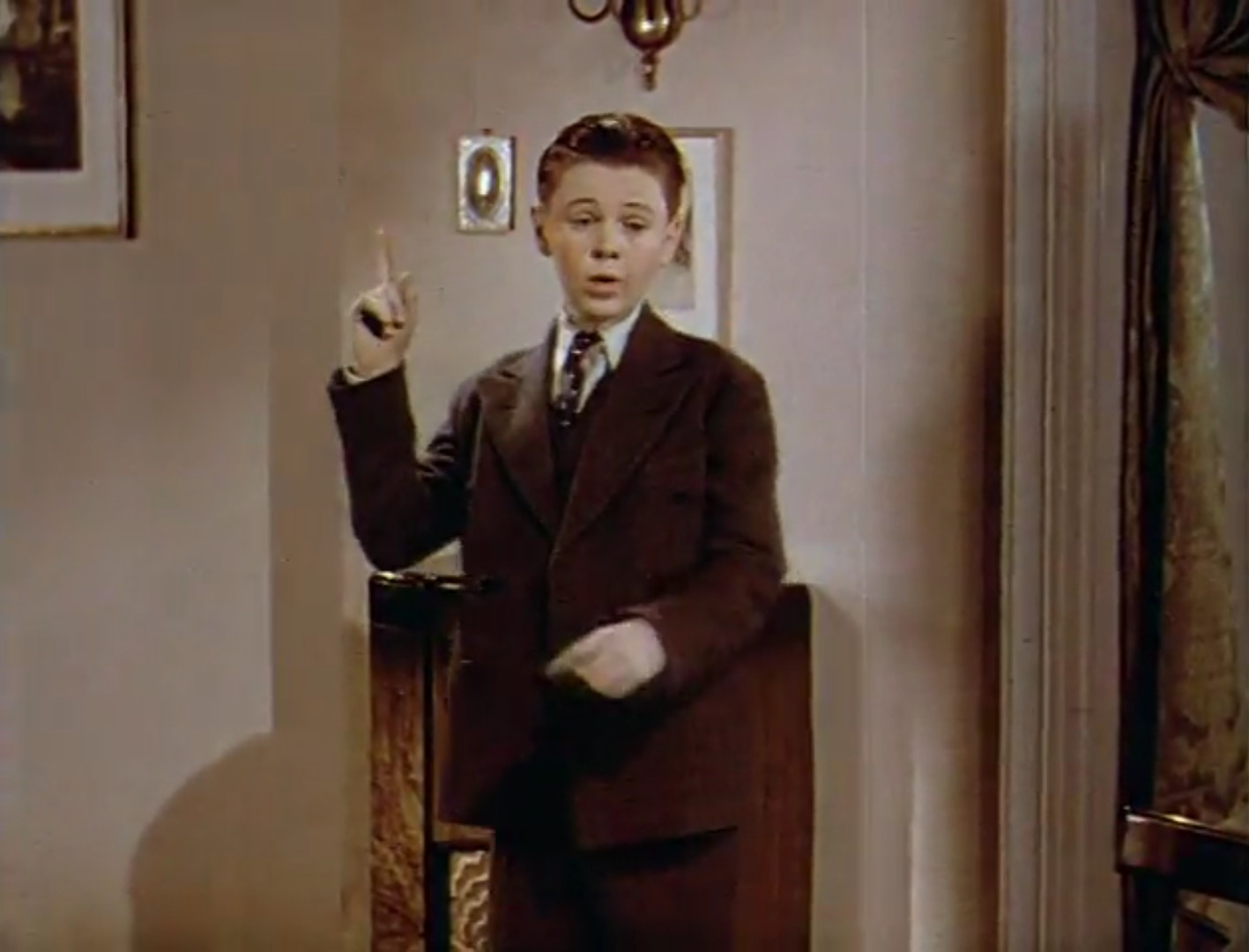
Jimmy Lydon in 1939

One of his first starring roles was the title character in the 1940 movie Tom Brown's School Days, also starring Cedric Hardwicke and Freddie Bartholomew. The film was well received by critics, with Variety praising it in a January 1940 review as "sympathetically and skillfully made, with many touching moments and an excellent cast". Lydon was called "believable and moving in the early portions, but too young for the final moments".

Between 1941 and 1944, under contract to Paramount Pictures, Lydon starred as the screechy-voiced, adolescent Henry Aldrich in the movie series of that title. After completing the Aldrich series, the 21-year-old Lydon signed a contract in 1944 with Republic Pictures.

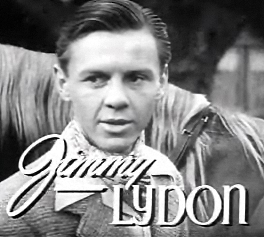
Lydon in Twice Blessed (1945)

He appeared in the acclaimed 1947 film Life with Father in the role of college-bound Clarence. Variety called Jimmy Lydon's portrayal "effective as the potential Yale man".

He then appeared opposite James Cagney in the 1948 movie The Time of Your Life. From 1949 to 1950, he and Janet Waldo voiced the leading characters in the radio comedy Young Love.

Lydon easily gained roles in the new medium of television. He portrayed Chris Thayer on The First Hundred Years. The show was CBS's first daytime soap opera. It was performed live for three seasons of 300 episodes.

In 1953, he was cast as Murray in the aviation adventure film Island in the Sky, starring John Wayne. He also played Biffen Cardoza on Rocky Jones, Space Ranger in 1954 and made appearances in Lux Video Theatre and The Christophers. In 1955, he appeared on Sergeant Preston of the Yukon as Johnny Lane, plagued by cabin fever, in the episode titled "The Williwaw". In 1956 he appeared in the episode "One Minute from Broadway" in the series Sneak Preview.

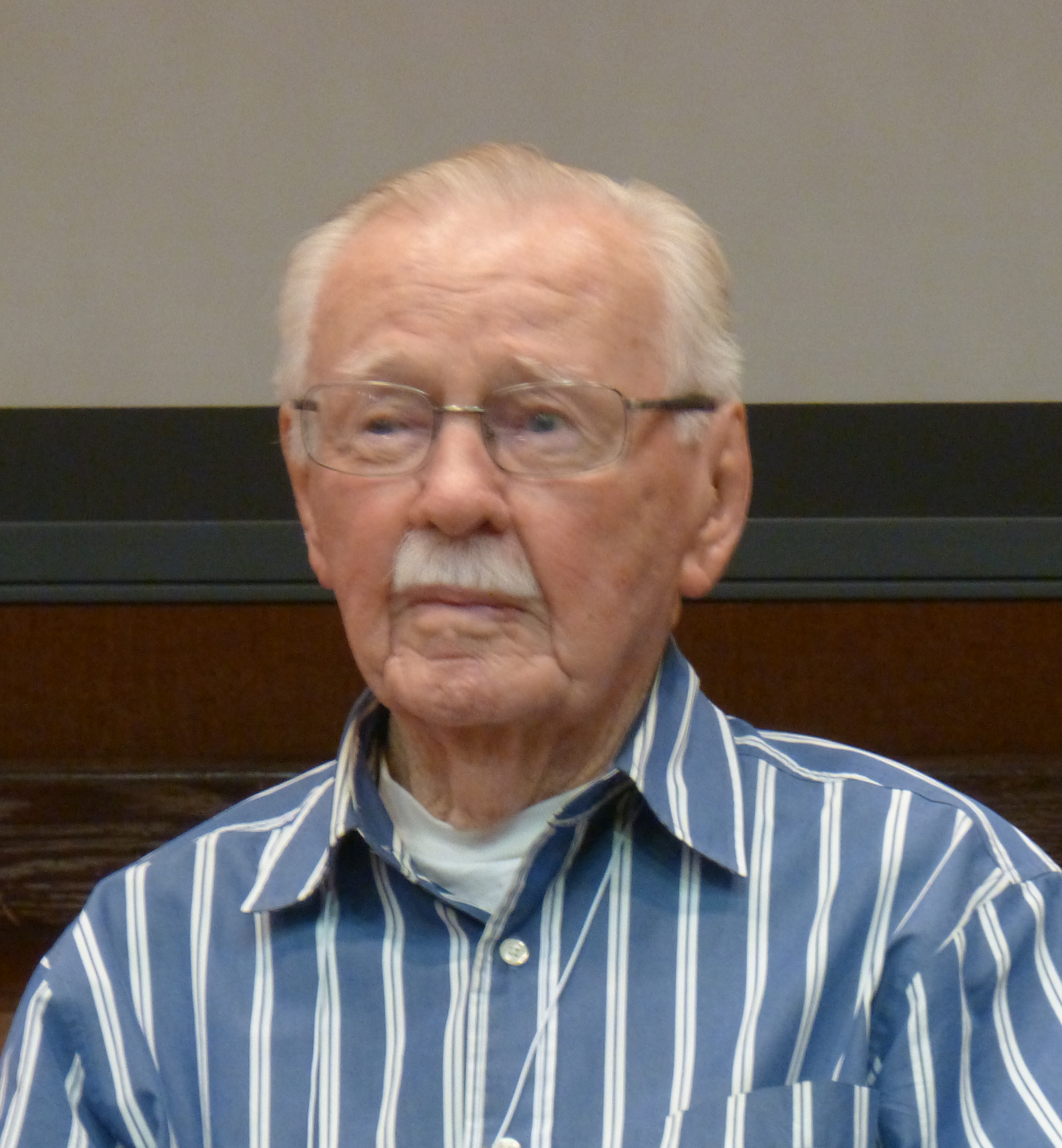
Lydon in 2013

In 1958, Lydon played the role of Richard in Anne Jeffreys' and Robert Sterling's short-lived sitcom Love That Jill. Lydon appeared in guest roles on Crossroads, Casey Jones, The Life and Legend of Wyatt Earp, Wagon Train, Hennesey, The Twilight Zone, and Tales of the Texas Rangers, as Lt. Jared Evans in the 1958 episode "Warpath". A year later, he guest-starred on the television series Colt .45. Lydon played the role of Willy in the episode "Return to El Paso", with Paul Picerni cast as Jose. He also appeared in the premiere episode of the anthology series New Comedy Showcase in 1960.

After working increasingly in television in the 1950s, he turned to production and helped to create the detective series 77 Sunset Strip, as well as the sitcom M*A*S*H. He also produced the television adaptation of the film Mister Roberts in 1966 and Roll Out in 1973–1974. Lydon played Captain Henry Aldrich (a reference to his Aldrich movie series) on the latter show.

In 1963, Lydon worked on the Western series Temple Houston on the fall schedule. On orders from studio boss Jack Webb, episodes were put together in two or three days each, something previously thought impossible in television production. Work began on August 7, 1963, with the initial airing set for September 19. Lydon recalls that Webb told the staff: "Fellas, I just sold Temple Houston. We gotta be on the air in four weeks, we can't use the pilot, we have no scripts, no nothing—do it!"

During the 1970s & 1980s, Lydon continued to act on television, with roles on episodes of Gunsmoke, Lou Grant, Simon & Simon, and St. Elsewhere.

== Personal life ==
Lydon married Patricia Pernetti in 1945. The union was dissolved after a brief period. He was married to Betty Lou Nedell from 1952 until her death in January 2022. They had two daughters and two granddaughters.

Lydon died at the age of 98 on March 9, 2022, at his home in San Diego, California.

== Filmography ==
Film

Year	Title	Role	Notes
1939	Back Door to Heaven	Frankie Rogers	
1939	The Middleton Family at the New York World's Fair	Bud	
1939	Two Thoroughbreds	David Carey	
1940	Tom Brown's School Days	Tom Brown	
1940	Little Men	Dan	
1940	Bowery Boy	Sock Dolan	
1941	Naval Academy	Tommy Blake	
1941	Henry Aldrich for President	Henry Aldrich	
1942	Cadets on Parade	Joe Novak	
1942	The Mad Martindales	Bobby Bruce Turner	
1942	Henry and Dizzy	Henry Aldrich	
1942	Henry Aldrich, Editor	Henry Aldrich	
1942	Star Spangled Rhythm	Jimmy Lydon	Uncredited
1943	Aerial Gunner	Pvt. Sanford 'Sandy' Lunt	
1943	Henry Aldrich Gets Glamour	Henry Aldrich	
1943	Henry Aldrich Swings It	Henry Aldrich	
1943	Henry Aldrich Haunts a House	Henry Aldrich	
1944	Henry Aldrich, Boy Scout	Henry Aldrich	
1944	My Best Gal	Johnny McCloud	
1944	Henry Aldrich Plays Cupid	Henry Aldrich	
1944	Henry Aldrich's Little Secret	Henry Aldrich	
1944	When the Lights Go On Again	Ted Benson	
1944	The Town Went Wild	Bob Harrison	
1945	Strange Illusion	Paul Cartwright	
1945	Twice Blessed	Mickey Pringle	
1946	Affairs of Geraldine	Willy Briggs	
1947	Life with Father	Clarence Day, Jr.	
1947	Cynthia	Ricky Latham	
1947	Sweet Genevieve	Bill Kennedy	
1947	Good News	Tommy's classmate	Uncredited
1948	The Time of Your Life	Dudley Raoul Bostwick	
1948	Out of the Storm	Donald Lewis	
1948	Joan of Arc	Pierre d'Arc	
1949	An Old-Fashioned Girl	Tom Shaw	
1949	Miss Mink of 1949	Joe Forrester	
1949	Bad Boy	Ted Hendry	
1949	Tucson	Andy Bryant	
1950	When Willie Comes Marching Home	Charles Fettles	
1950	Tarnished	Junior Bunker	
1950	Destination Big House	Freddy Brooks	
1950	September Affair	Johnny Wilson	
1950	Hot Rod	David Langham	
1950	The Magnificent Yankee	Clinton	
1951	Gasoline Alley	Skeezix	
1951	Oh! Susanna	Trumpeter Benton	
1951	Corky of Gasoline Alley	Skeezix Wallet	
1953	Island in the Sky	Murray	
1954	The Desperado	Tom Cameron	
1955	Rage at Dawn	Dedrick - Fisher's Clerk	Uncredited
1956	Battle Stations	Squawk Hewitt	
1957	Chain of Evidence	Steve Nordstrom	
1960	The Hypnotic Eye	Emergency doctor	
1960	I Passed for White	Jay Morgan	
1961	The Last Time I Saw Archie	Pvt. Billy Simpson	
1969	Death of a Gunfighter	Luke Mills	
1971	Scandalous John	Grotch	
1971	The Strange Monster of Strawberry Cove	Jim Durden	
1973	Bonnie's Kids	Motel Manager	
1976	Vigilante Force	Tom Crousy	

Short subjects:

- Home Early (1939) as Junior Doakes (uncredited)
- A Letter from Bataan (1942) as Chuck Lewis
- The Aldrich Family Gets in the Scrap (1943) as Henry Aldrich
- Caribbean Romance (1943) as Peter Conway
- The Shining Future (1944) as Danny Ames
- Road to Victory (1944) as Danny Ames
- Time to Kill (1945) as Lou
