= Henry Aldrich Gets Glamour =

1943 film

- Theatrical release poster
- Directed by: Hugh Bennett
- Written by: Edwin Blum; Aleen Leslie
- Produced by: Walter MacEwen
- Starring: Jimmy Lydon; Charles Smith; John Litel; Olive Blakeney; Diana Lynn; Frances Gifford
- Cinematography: Daniel L. Fapp
- Edited by: Arthur P. Schmidt
- Music by: Robert Emmett Dolan
- Production company: Paramount Pictures
- Distributed by: Paramount Pictures
- Release date: April 30, 1943
- Running time: 72 minutes
- Country: United States
- Language: English

Henry Aldrich Gets Glamour is a 1943 American comedy film directed by Hugh Bennett and written by Edwin Blum and Aleen Leslie. The film stars Jimmy Lydon, Charles Smith, John Litel, Olive Blakeney, Diana Lynn and Frances Gifford. The film was released on April 30, 1943, by Paramount Pictures.

== Plot ==
Henry Aldrich becomes the most sought after guy in town when he wins a date with a movie star.

== Cast ==
- Jimmy Lydon as Henry Aldrich
- Charles Smith as Dizzy Stevens
- John Litel as Mr. Sam Aldrich
- Olive Blakeney as Mrs. Aldrich
- Diana Lynn as Phyllis Michael
- Frances Gifford as Hilary Dane
- Gail Russell as Virginia Lowry
- Vaughan Glaser as Mr. Bradley
- Anne Rooney as Evelyn
