= Don't Get Me Wrong (film) =

1937 film by Reginald Purdell and Arthur B. Woods

- Australian daybill poster
- Directed by: Arthur B. Woods; Reginald Purdell
- Written by: Frank Launder; Reginald Purdell; Brock Williams
- Produced by: Irving Asher
- Starring: Max Miller; George E. Stone; Olive Blakeney
- Cinematography: Basil Emmott; Robert LaPresle
- Edited by: Arthur Ridout
- Production company: Warner Brothers-First National Productions
- Distributed by: Warner Brothers
- Release date: March 1937
- Running time: 80 minutes
- Country: United Kingdom
- Language: English

Don't Get Me Wrong is a 1937 British comedy film co-directed by Arthur B. Woods and Reginald Purdell and starring Max Miller and George E. Stone. It was written by Frank Launder, Reginald Purdell and Brock Williams, and made at Teddington Studios with sets designed by Peter Proud. The film was made by the British subsidiary of Warner Brothers, on a considerably higher budget than many of the quota quickies the studios usually produced.

== Preservation status ==
The British Film Institute National Archive holds the film.

== Synopsis ==
Miller plays a fairground performer who meets a professor who claims to have invented a cheap substitute for petrol. They team up and persuade a millionaire to finance them to develop and market the product, while unsavoury elements are keen to steal the formula and try all means to get their hands on it, involving slapstick chases and double-crosses. It then turns out that the miracle fluid is diluted coconut oil, and the genius professor is an escaped lunatic. The millionaire finds himself taking the brunt of the disappointment.

== Main cast ==
- Max Miller as Wellington Lincoln
- George E. Stone as Chuck
- Olive Blakeney as Frankie
- Glen Alyn as Christine
- Clifford Heatherley as Sir George Baffin
- Wallace Evennett as Dr. Rudolph Pepper
- Alexander Field as Gray

== Reception ==
The Monthly Film Bulletin wrote: "Max Miller fights a losing battle, employing his natural comic genius hopelessly against a runaway story. Laboratory scenes and air thrills are well constructed, but the abundant dialogue is neither funny nor suited to the star. There seems little point in using a Hollywood character actor – the delightful George E. Stone – if no attempt is made to understand his possibilities."

Kine Weekly wrote: "Riotous big-business comedy extravagranza with a made-to-measure part for Max Miller. The story, similar in character to Educated Evans, is great stuff, and it receives all the momentum it needs in the star's exuberant verbosity. There is no flagging in the development, which embraces breathless aerial spectacle, nor is there a single let-down on the part of the enthusiastic supporting team. Excellent light entertainment, a certain box-office proposition for the masses."

The Daily Film Renter wrote: "Max Miller sweeps through action with characteristically breezy portrayal, putting over hilarious Cockney patter at rapid rate, and extracting utmost from role. ... Excellently staged in fairground, factory and airport locales, this is entirely safe popular entertainment, with added pull for Miller following. ... This is grand, robust humour, calculated to appeal to most patrons."
