= The Doctor Takes a Wife =

1940 film by Alexander Hall

- Directed by: Alexander Hall
- Written by: George Seaton; Ken Englund
- Story by: Aleen Leslie
- Produced by: William Perlberg
- Starring: Loretta Young; Ray Milland; Gail Patrick
- Cinematography: Sid Hickox
- Edited by: Viola Lawrence
- Music by: Morris Stoloff
- Production company: Columbia Pictures
- Distributed by: Columbia Pictures
- Release date: April 30, 1940
- Running time: 88 minutes
- Country: United States
- Language: English

The Doctor Takes a Wife is a 1940 American screwball comedy film directed by Alexander Hall and starring Loretta Young, Ray Milland, Reginald Gardiner, Gail Patrick and Edmund Gwenn. It was produced and distributed by Columbia Pictures. Young and Milland portray a best-selling author and medical school instructor, respectively, who find it convenient to pretend to be married, even though they initially loathe each other.

Young had recently left 20th Century Fox after turning down Darryl F. Zanuck's offer of a new contract and going freelance, it was her first film at Columbia since Man's Castle in 1933.

== Plot ==
June Cameron is the celebrated writer of a feminist book while medical instructor Doctor Timothy Sterling is a slightly misogynist cynic. After she badgers him into giving her a lift from the isolated Connecticut hotel in which they are both staying, a misunderstanding leads to the newspapers declaring that she has turned her back on her beliefs and married him. Both naturally want to deny it, but her publisher and fiancé convinces her that her former angle is now ruined and that she must now write a pro-marriage book. After a certain period she can then go to Reno and get a divorce. Timothy wants nothing to do with this scheme until he learns he has been made a professor by his college, based solely on the fact that he is now a married man rather than a bachelor.

Timothy plays along with the scheme, concealing from June that this arrangement also benefits him and portraying it as a sacrifice done entirely for her sake. Complications ensue when his own long-standing fiancée Marilyn arrives back in town. She becomes jealous despite his attempts to portray his (non-existent) relationship with June as a marriage of convenience. Timothy tries desperately to juggle his pretend fiancée and his real fiancée, even as he begins to develop feelings for June.

== Cast ==
- Loretta Young as June Cameron
- Ray Milland as Dr. Timothy Sterling
- Reginald Gardiner as John R. Pierce
- Gail Patrick as Marilyn Thomas
- Edmund Gwenn as Dr. Lionel Sterling
- Frank Sully as Louie Slapcovitch
- Gordon Jones as O'Brien
- Georges Metaxa as Jean Rovere
- Charles Halton as Dr. Streeter
- Joseph Eggenton as Dr. Nielson
- Paul McAllister as Dean Lawton
- Chester Clute as Johnson
- Hal K. Dawson as Charlie
- Edward Van Sloan as Burkhardt
- Virginia Sale as a school teacher (uncredited)
- Vernon Dent as man in drugstore (uncredited)
- Dorothy Appleby as woman in drugstore (uncredited)

== Critical reception ==
Variety felt it was "a light comedy with farcical trimmings that depends on punchy dialog and semi-slapstick situations for a good supply of laughs" while the New York Times review noted "thanks to Mr. Milland's genteel clowning and a couple of dependable farce situations - one of which is the frantic business of keeping two unsuspecting parties going in adjacent apartments at the same time - the comic pace is generally maintained".

== Bibliography ==
- Dick, Bernard F. Hollywood Madonna: Loretta Young. University Press of Mississippi, 2011.
- Milberg, Doris. The Art of the Screwball Comedy: Madcap Entertainment from the 1930s to Today. McFarland, 2013.
- McKay, James. Ray Milland: The Films, 1929-1984. McFarland, 2020.
