= The Stork Pays Off =

1941 film directed by Lew Landers

- Theatrical release poster
- Directed by: Lew Landers
- Screenplay by: Fanya Foss; Aleen Leslie
- Produced by: Jack Fier
- Starring: Victor Jory; Rochelle Hudson; Maxie Rosenbloom; Horace McMahon; George McKay; Ralf Harolde
- Cinematography: L. William O'Connell
- Edited by: Gene Milford
- Music by: Morris Stoloff
- Production company: Columbia Pictures
- Distributed by: Columbia Pictures
- Release date: October 6, 1941
- Running time: 68 minutes
- Country: United States
- Language: English

The Stork Pays Off is a 1941 American comedy film directed by Lew Landers and starring Victor Jory, Rochelle Hudson, Maxie Rosenbloom, Horace McMahon, George McKay and Ralf Harolde. The screenplay was written by Fanya Foss and Aleen Leslie. The film was released on October 6, 1941, by Columbia Pictures.

== Plot ==
Gangster Deak Foster and his three henchmen, Brains Moran, Ears-to-the-Ground Hinkle and Photofinish Farris, take over what they think is a night club run by a rival, Stud Rocco, only to discover it is a nursery run by Irene Perry. All fall under the benign influence to the point where the three henchmen go to night school to be educated and Deak falls in love with Julie.

== Cast ==
- Victor Jory as Deak Foster
- Rochelle Hudson as Irene Perry
- Maxie Rosenbloom as 'Brains' Moran
- Horace McMahon as 'Ears-to-the-Ground' Hinkle
- George McKay as 'Photofinish' Farris
- Ralf Harolde as 'Stud' Rocco
- Danny Mummert as Herkemer
- Bonnie Irma Dane as Bonnie
- Arthur Loft as Barney

== Bibliography ==
- Fetrow, Alan G. Feature Films, 1940-1949: a United States Filmography. McFarland, 1994.
