= Everett Douglas =

American film editor (1902–1967)

- Born: October 11, 1902; United States
- Died: December 7, 1967 (aged 65); Los Angeles, California, United States
- Occupation: Editor
- Years active: 1934-1967 (film & TV)

Everett Douglas (1902–1967) was an American film editor. He was under contract to Paramount Pictures for many years. At the end of his career he edited numerous episodes of the western television series Bonanza.

He was nominated for the Academy Award for Best Film Editing at the 1954 Oscars for his work on The War of the Worlds.

== Selected filmography ==
- The Sky Parade (1936)
- Straight from the Shoulder (1936)
- The Last Train from Madrid (1937)
- Among the Living (1941)
- The Virginian (1946)
- Welcome Stranger (1947)
- Ladies' Man (1947)
- The Sainted Sisters (1948)
- Miss Tatlock's Millions (1948)
- Thunder in the East (1951)
- The War of the Worlds (1953)
- The Naked Jungle (1954)
- The Scarlet Hour (1956)
- The Joker Is Wild (1957)
- Omar Khayyam (1957)
- The Trap (1959)

== Bibliography ==
- Lynn Kear and James King. Evelyn Brent: The Life and Films of Hollywood's Lady Crook. McFarland, 2009.
