= Charles Smith (actor) =

American character actor (1920–1988)

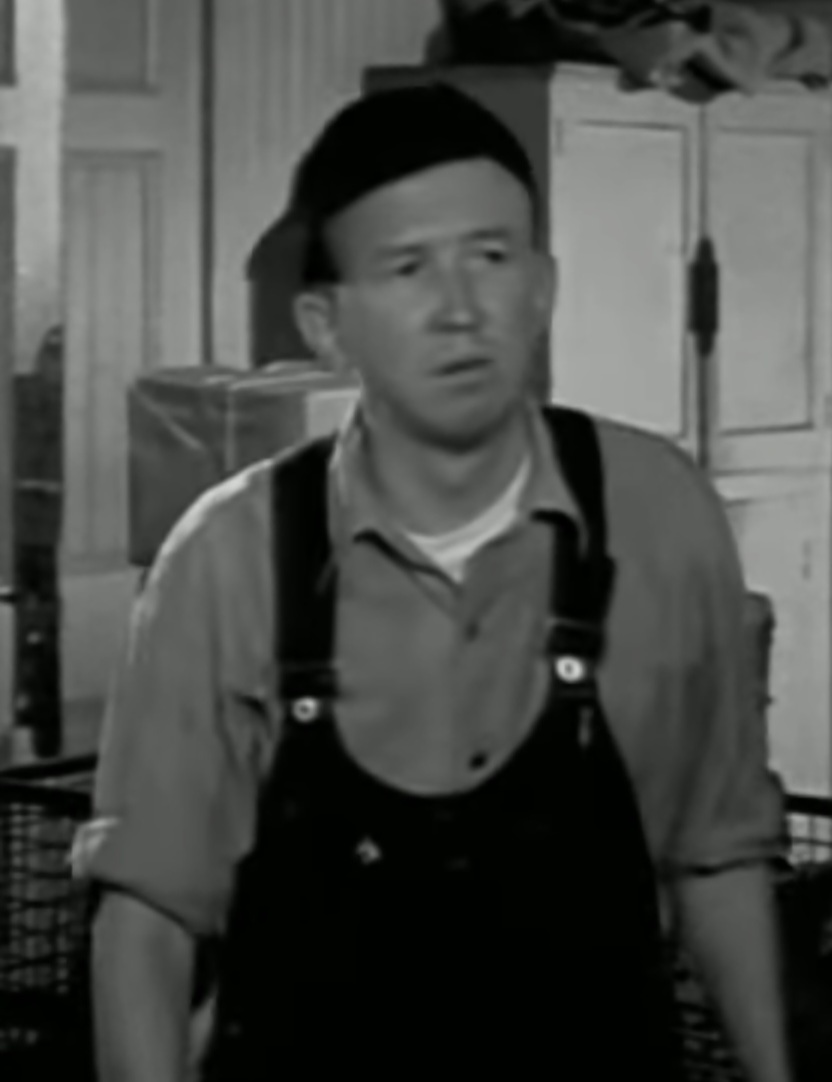
- Smith in Suddenly (1954)
- Born: Charles Begore Smith; September 13, 1920; Flint, Michigan, U.S.
- Died: December 26, 1988 (aged 68); Burbank, California, U.S.
- Occupation: Actor
- Years active: 1939–1967

Charles Begore Smith (September 13, 1920 – December 26, 1988) was an American character actor. He was born in Flint, Michigan.

He had notable roles in The Shop Around the Corner (1940) and The Major and the Minor (1942). (He also had a minor singing role in the film In the Good Old Summertime, the 1949 musical remake of "The Shop Around the Corner".) As a tall, gangly young man in his early twenties, he played high schooler Dizzy Stevens, the sidekick of Henry Aldrich, in nine Aldrich Family films between 1941 and 1944. He also played Collins, the senior U.S. Senate page boy in the 1941 film Adventure in Washington. He later had recurring roles in several TV series.

== Selected filmography ==
Year	Title	Role	Notes
1940	The Shop Around the Corner	Rudy	
1941	Adventure in Washington	Collins	
1941	Andy Hardy's Private Secretary	Bob	uncredited
1941	Men of Boys Town	Slim	
1941	Cheers for Miss Bishop	'Buddy' Warner	
1941	Henry Aldrich for President	Dizzy Stevens	
1942	The Major and the Minor	Cadet Korner	
1942	Yankee Doodle Dandy	Teenager	uncredited
1943	A Guy Named Joe	Sanderson	
1944	Henry Aldrich, Boy Scout	Dizzy Stevens	
1944	Henry Aldrich Plays Cupid	Dizzy Stevens	
1946	Three Little Girls in Blue	Mike Bailey	uncredited
1947	The Trouble with Women	Ulysses S. Jones	(filmed in 1945)
1947	Out of the Blue (1947 film)	Elevator Boy	as Charlie Smith
1949	In the Good Old Summertime	Member of Quartette	uncredited
1950	Father of the Bride	An Usher of the Groom	uncredited
1954	Suddenly	Bebop	
