= Daniel L. Fapp =

American cinematographer

Daniel L. Fapp, A.S.C.
- Born: April 21, 1904; Kansas City, Kansas, United States
- Died: July 19, 1986 (aged 82); Laguna Niguel, California, United States
- Occupation: Cinematographer
- Years active: 1921–1969

Daniel L. Fapp, A.S.C. (April 21, 1904 – July 19, 1986) was an American cinematographer, best known as the director of photography for West Side Story (1961), for which he won an Academy Award for Best Cinematography, and The Great Escape (1963). He also was nominated for Academy Awards for his cinematography for Desire Under the Elms (1958), The Five Pennies (1959), One, Two, Three (1961), The Unsinkable Molly Brown (1964), Ice Station Zebra (1968) and Marooned (1969).

== Life ==
Fapp was born in Kansas City, Kansas.

He died in Laguna Niguel, California, at the age of 82.

== Career ==
=== Early years and Paramount ===
Fapp was working as a cameraman in Hollywood by 1930, when he appeared as "Dan Fapp" in a roster of camera personnel published by The International Photographer. He spent much of his career as a staff cinematographer at Paramount Pictures, where he was repeatedly paired with the art director Hans Dreier.

By the late 1950s American Cinematographer described him as "one of Paramount's photographic stalwarts". Its account of the making of Desire Under the Elms (1958) shows him lighting a close-up of Sophia Loren with three broadsides placed close to the VistaVision camera.

=== West Side Story ===
Fapp photographed West Side Story for Mirisch Pictures and Seven Arts Productions in Panavision 70 and color, with location work in New York. For the night sequences, both those shot on stage and those shot on location, he placed a light fog filter over the lens to give a realistic sense of night and to soften the colors so that they did not appear too harsh. The magazine credited his "imaginative lighting and camerawork" as complementing the production's overall design.

=== Later films ===
Having shot One, Two, Three and West Side Story for the Mirisch Company, Fapp was engaged by the same producers for The Great Escape. American Cinematographer singled out the sequence in which recaptured prisoners are shot, observing that the overcast weather matched the mood of the scene and that Fapp's photography and lighting gave it considerable pictorial force. He also photographed All the Young Men (1960) for Hall Bartlett Productions, with Alan Ladd and Sidney Poitier. Reviewing the film, American Cinematographer praised his rendering of snow, which it said had "texture and form and a gravure quality".

== Filmography ==
Daniel L. Fapp either made or participated in the following movies:

- Kitty (1945)
- To Each His Own (1946)
- The Big Clock (1948)
- Sorrowful Jones (1949)
- Union Station (1950)
- The Girls of Pleasure Island (1953)
- Knock on Wood (1954)
- Living It Up (1954)
- The Far Horizons (1955)
- The Birds and the Bees (1956)
- The Joker Is Wild (1957)
- Desire Under the Elms (1958)
- Kings Go Forth (1958)
- The Trap (1959)
- All the Young Men (1960)
- Let's Make Love (1960)
- One, Two, Three (1961)
- West Side Story (1961) (director of photography)
- GE True (1 episode, 1962)
- The Pigeon That Took Rome (1962)
- Bachelor Flat (1962)
- Move Over, Darling (1963)
- Fun in Acapulco (1963) (director of photography)
- A New Kind of Love (1963)
- The Great Escape (1963) (director of photography)
- The Pleasure Seekers (1964)
- Send Me No Flowers (1964) (as Daniel Fapp)
- The Unsinkable Molly Brown (1964)
- I'll Take Sweden (1965)
- Spinout (1966)
- Lord Love a Duck (1966)
- Our Man Flint (1966)
- Double Trouble (1967)
- Ice Station Zebra (1968)
- 5 Card Stud (1968)
- Sweet November (1968)
- Marooned (1969)
