= The Aldrich Family (TV series) =

American TV situation comedy (1949–1953)

- Country of origin: United States
- Original language: English

Original release
- Network: NBC
- Release: October 2, 1949 – September 12, 1953

The Aldrich Family is an American television situation comedy that was broadcast on NBC from October 2, 1949, through September 12, 1953. Adapted from the radio program of the same name, which was based on Clifford Goldsmith's Broadway play What a Life (1938), it was the first successful situation comedy on NBC television. The program was also broadcast in Canada.

== Background ==
In late May 1949 a kinescope recording of a video version of The Aldrich Family was made. The New York Times reported that the appeal of that pilot episode would determine whether the radio series would continue as well as whether the program would have a future in television. The article said, "The sponsor's theory, of course, is that he wants to have a package which will be suitable to either medium." The article added that putting the show on TV would likely require a replacement for Ezra Stone as Henry Aldrich because the discrepancy between Stone's age and that of his character "has not been too vital on radio but is important in a visual art".

== Overview ==
The Aldrich family consisted of parents Sam and Alice, daughter Mary, and son Henry. Sam was the district attorney for their town (Centerville), Alice was a homemaker, and Mary and Henry attended Centerville High School. Homer was Henry's friend. Initially Kathleen was Henry's girlfriend, but Eleanor later replaced her. Mr. Bradley was the high school's principal. Henry was "trouble prone", with Homer as his "cohort in misadventure". Each episode opened with Alice calling, "Henry! Henry Aldrich!", to which he replied, "Coming, Mother!"

== Cast ==
Many characters on The Aldrich Family were portrayed by more than one actor during its time on TV.

Cast of The Aldrich Family on TV
Character	Actor(s)
Henry Aldrich	Bob Casey, Richard Tyler, Henry Girard, Kenneth Nelson, Bobby Ellis
Sam Aldrich	House Jameson
Alice Aldrich	Lois Wilson, Nancy Carroll, Barbara Robbins, Jean Muir*
Mary Aldrich	Charita Bauer, Mary Malone, June Dayton
Aunt Harriet	Ethel Wilson
Homer Brown	Jackie Kelk, Robert Barry, Jackie Grimes
Homer's mother	Leona Powers
Homer's father	Howard Smith
Kathleen	Marcia Henderson
Eleanor	Loretta Leversee
Mr. Bradley	Robert Ridgley, Joseph Foley
Anna Mitchell	Ann Sorg
George Bigelow	Lionel Wilson
Charlie Clark	Peter Griffith

*Muir was signed to portray Mary Aldrich but never performed in that role.

== Jean Muir's dismissal ==
Accusations that Jean Muir was connected with Communist organizations led to her dismissal from the cast of The Aldrich Family before she performed in an episode and resulted in a delay of the show's return to the air in the fall of 1950. Nancy Carroll was hired to replace Muir, and sponsor General Foods Corporation canceled the episode scheduled to be the premiere for the 1950-51 season (August 27, 1950).

Complaints about Muir arose after her name appeared in Red Channels, a booklet that listed names of performers and "purported Left-wing organizations" of which they were said to have been officials or that they had supported. NBC and General Foods received complaints in the forms of "twenty-odd telephone calls and a like number of letters."

General Foods said that Muir had become "a controversial personality" as a result of the protests and that having her on the program might hurt sales of the company's products. Muir said, "I am not a Communist, have not been one and believe that the Communists represent a vicious and destructive force, and I am opposed to them." She added that she had received full payment for her 18-week contract, "which could have been legally canceled if the charges were true."

On September 26, 1950, General Foods announced that it had temporarily suspended the policy that resulted in Muir's dismissal. Muir was not immediately reinstated. The company expected to follow guidelines that it hoped would come out of a September 29, 1950, meeting of representatives of various aspects of the broadcasting industry.

== Episodes ==
Partial list of episodes of The Aldrich Family
Date	Episode
November 28, 1952	"The Blue Suit"
December 5, 1952	"The Race"
December 12, 1952	"The Dancing Lesson"
December 19, 1952	"Health"
December 26, 1952	"On Christmas Afternoon"
January 23, 1953	"The Latin Exam"
January 30, 1953	"Henry's Lucky Day"
February 6, 1953	"The Girl from Abbott City"
February 13, 1953	"Drugstore Cowboy"
March 6, 1953	"Sam Helps Out"
March 13, 1953	"Henry's Dinner Engagement"
May 22, 1953	"The Practical Joke"
May 29, 1953	"Hidden Candy"

== Production ==
Goldsmith created the series. Producers included Ed Duerr, Roger Kay, Frank Papp, Joseph Sciretta, Lester Vail, and Ralph Warren. Directors included Kay, Papp, Ezra Stone, and Vail. Writers included Larry Markes, Theodore Ferro, Mathilde Ferro, Bud Grossman, Goldsmith, Edith Sommer, Robert W. Sonderberg, Edward Jurist, and Norman Tokar.

The Aldrich Family originated from WNBT. From its debut through June 1951, it was broadcast on Sundays from 7:30 to 8 p.m. Eastern Time. When it returned in September 1951, it was moved to Fridays from 9:30 to 10 p.m. E. T., and it ended its run in that time slot. It was replaced by Campbell TV SoundStage.

General Foods initially sponsored the show, replaced in late spring 1951 by Campbell's Soups. Approximately one week after the change occurred, Campbell's officials learned that Kelk would not return to play Homer because General Foods had signed him for a new situation comedy. At the same time, Jurist and Tokar left The Aldrich Family to write for the new show. The trade publication Billboard reported that General Foods was resentful because it felt that the William Morris Agency, which packaged the show, had not allowed General Foods enough time to exercise its option.

== Critical response ==
About a month after The Aldrich Family debuted on TV, a review in The New York Times said that prospects for the show's future looked good. The review complimented Goldsmith's ability to write so that people in the audience could often recognize themselves in the program's characters. It said that Casey "does a remarkably finished job" as Henry. In contrast, it added, Kelk's actions as Homer "seem a little too mature and forced to go with the awkwardness and falsetto whine so long identified with the character." Jameson and Wilson were complimented for their performances as the Aldrich parents.

A review of the September 3, 1950, episode in The New York Times found a number of flaws, starting with the story ("a hackneyed item that never really caught the flavor of the adolescent humor" of Henry and Homer). The review noted Carroll's nervousness and unnecessary gesturing as Henry's mother, but it added that they might have resulted from her relatively recent selection to replace Muir, who had been cast in that role. However, "a more serious casting problem", Jack Gould wrote, was the casting of Tyler and Kelk as the teenage Henry and Homer. Especially in closeups, Gould said, "it is particularly difficult to believe that they are youngsters in their early high school years." The review concluded by observing that the show "obviously needs more time to get settled down."

A review of the September 7, 1951, episode in the trade publication Billboard focused on the change in cast members as the 1951-1952 season began. Only Jameson returned from the previous season's cast. Reviewer June Bundy singled out Girard and Barry as "poor substitutes" for their predecessors, Stone and Kelk. She wrote, "Neither boy showed any sense of comedy timing", which she said was made more evident by the polished performances of Jameson and Robbins. Additionally, Bundy said that the plot was "skimpy" and it contained too many "cliche-ridden speeches". "The best thing in the show", she concluded, was the advertising for Campbell's soups.

In 1953, John Lester wrote in the York Daily Record that over the past 15 years The Aldrich Family "has become a recognizable, if exaggerated, portrait of the average American household." Lester illustrated how the video version of the program intensified Jameson's identification with the Sam Aldrich character. which had already been established by the radio version. Jameson's neighbors called him "Sam" more often than they used his real name. At one point, a man and his wife who had been hired to work on Jameson's farm quit unexpectedly. The man's explanation was, "You told us your name was House Jameson, when everybody knows you're 'Sam Aldrich'. We don't want to work for a man who lies about his own name!"

The Aldrich Family was named "Favorite TV Comedy Story" in the Radio Television Mirror Awards for 1950. Winners of the awards were voted on by readers of Radio Television Mirror magazine.

== Revival attempts ==
TV Guide reported in July 1954 that The Aldrich Family, "absent from TV more than a year, returns in the fall on CBS." It added that no cast had been selected and the program "probably will be done live from Hollywood." Mel Epstein, a staff producer at CBS Television, attempted another TV version of The Aldrich Family in 1955. After a first pilot episode "proved unsatisfactory", a second pilot was scheduled to be shot on March 26 at Motion Picture Center.
