= Nazi Eyes on Canada =

Canadian radio play

Nazi Eyes on Canada is a five-part Canadian radio play broadcast by CBC Radio in the fall of 1942.

Each of the stories focuses on a real family from a different province of Canada (Ontario, Alberta, New Brunswick, British Columbia and Saskatchewan), then portrays an imagined horrible future for the family if Nazi Germany were to win the Second World War.

The cast included Orson Welles, Vincent Price, Helen Hayes, Judith Evelyn, war correspondent Quentin Reynolds, House Jameson and Katharine Raht of The Aldrich Family, and Lorne Greene.

The episodes, produced by James Frank Willis, were made in co-operation with the National War Finance Committee, a government committee established to encourage the sale of War bonds.

== Episodes ==
- Premier episode with Helen Hayes (20 September 1942)
- "Spies and Sabotage" (27 September 1942)
- "Flame In The House" (4 October 1942)
- "Maritimes Under The Nazis" (11 October 1942)
- "The Holly Metcalf And Bob Maxwell Story" (18 October 1942)
- "Alameda" (25 October 1942)

== Preservation status ==
"Alameda" is one of four of Orson Welles's wartime radio broadcasts included as supplementary material in the Kino Classics restoration of The Stranger (1946), released on DVD and Blu-ray Disc in October 2013.
