= Ezra Stone =

American actor (1917–1994)

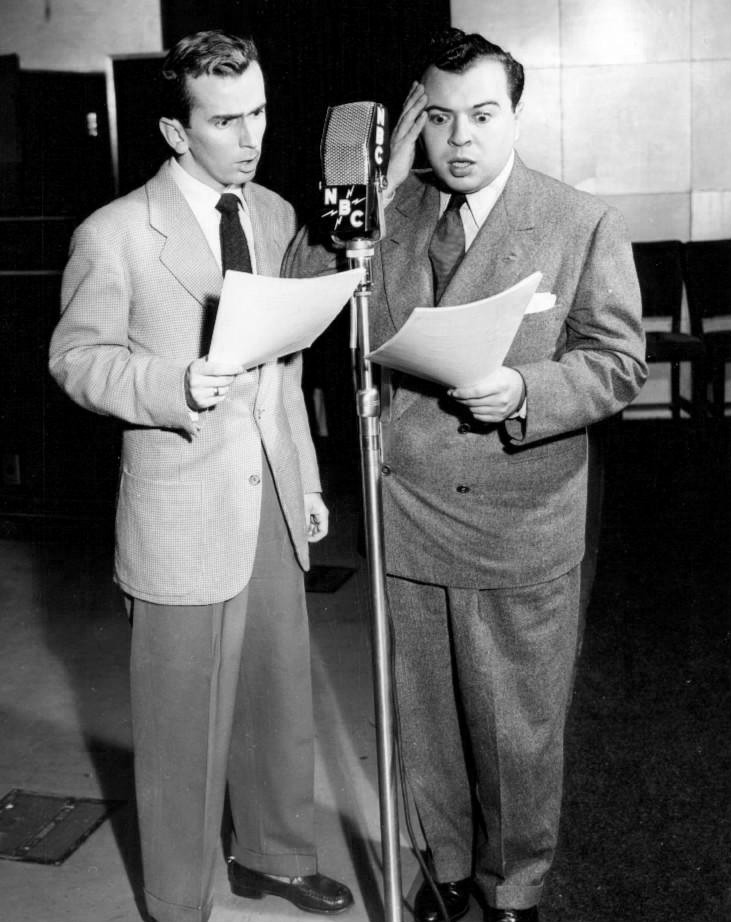
- Stone (right) as Henry Aldrich with Jackie Kelk as Homer Brown, 1947.
- Born: Ezra Chaim Feinstone; December 2, 1917; New Bedford, Massachusetts, United States
- Died: March 3, 1994 (aged 76); Perth Amboy, New Jersey, United States
- Other name: M/Sgt. Ezra Stone
- Occupations: Actor, television and film director
- Years active: 1925–1982
- Spouse: Sara Seegar (m. 1942; died 1990)
- Children: 2

Ezra Stone (born Ezra Chaim Feinstone; December 2, 1917 – March 3, 1994) was an American actor and director who had a long career on the stage, in films, radio, and television, mostly as a director. His most notable role as an actor was that of the awkwardly mischievous teenager Henry Aldrich in the radio comedy hit The Aldrich Family for most of its fourteen-year run.

== Biography ==
=== Early years ===
The son of Mr. and Mrs. Sol Feinstone, Stone was born in New Bedford, Massachusetts. His father was a chemistry professor. Stone attended Temple University's Oak Lane Country Day School and later studied acting at the American Academy of Dramatic Arts.

=== Career ===
Stone debuted on radio in Philadelphia when he was 7 years old, doing what he referred to as "that horrible thing called 'recitations' ... It might have been The Raven or The Spartans to the Gladiators ... very heavy stuff."

Stone began his professional career on stage in the mid-1930s, when he was first tapped to play Henry Aldrich in the Clifford Goldsmith play, What a Life. Goldsmith then brought Henry and his family to sketches for popular radio series featuring singers Rudy Vallee and Kate Smith, before the sketches' popularity moved NBC to give Goldsmith a chance to develop a full half-hour comedy as a summer replacement for Jack Benny in 1939.

==== The Aldrich Family ====
By 1939, The Aldrich Family had become a hit series in its own right; Katharine Raht's (as mother Alice Aldrich) opening shout ("Hen-reeeeeee! Hennnnn-ry Aldrich!") and Stone's warbling reply ("Coming, Mother!"), fashioned at first by Kate Smith's director Bob Welsh, became the show's instant trademarks. House Jameson played stern but affectionate father Sam Aldrich.

In one way, the show and its star were deceptive, according to radio historian Gerald Nachman: like Fanny Brice, who played five- or six-year-old Baby Snooks for over two decades, Ezra Stone didn't exactly resemble a clumsy teenager, either.

Ezra Stone . . . a dark-eyed Jewish kid . . . looked nothing at all like a gawky all-American boy next door in the studio audience's minds. Recalls (Jackie) Kelk (who played Henry's buddy Homer), "It was a big shock to people who came to see the show in the studio, because I looked more the (Henry Aldrich) part; I was slight and skinny. Ezra was this fat little man in a vest who smoked cigars. (From "Valued Families," in Raised on Radio. (Pantheon Books, 1998.)

But Nachman also noted The Aldrich Family, for better or worse, "set the tone" for many situation comedies to be, even if it was somewhat derivative of the Andy Hardy formula of girls, grades, and growing pains. Popularity aside, The Aldrich Family itself, Nachman continued,

. . . was hopelessly bland, neither quite zany nor lifelike, and Henry's teenage girl problems and peccadilloes, heard on tape today, lack the charm, spice, or whimsy of rival shows like Junior Miss or Meet Corliss Archer---possibly because the young female is more complex than the male.

Whether or not he really resembled his character, Stone played Henry until 1942. During his military service, Henry was played by Norman Tokar (one of the show's writers, and the eventual lead director for television's Leave It to Beaver, a show influenced to some degree by The Aldrich Family), Dickie Jones (1943–44), and Raymond Ives (1944–45). Stone then returned to the role after the war and stayed until 1952, when Bobby Ellis took the role for the show's final radio season.

==== Television ====
When his acting life with The Aldrich Family ended, Stone turned primarily to directing on stage and in television---ironically, his first television directing assignment was the television version of The Aldrich Family in 1952. From there he went on to direct for numerous shows, including I Married Joan, Bachelor Father, Bob Hope Presents the Chrysler Theatre, Lassie, The Munsters, Lost in Space, Julia, and Love, American Style.

By 1969, he was estimated to have directed 300-400 televisions programs.

Stone also played numerous small roles in film and television, such as the role of a film director in the episode "Show Biz" in Season 2 of the television series Emergency!. In 1976, he appeared in a television special, The Good Old Days of Radio, in which he and several vintage radio stars---including Art Linkletter, Eddie Anderson (Rochester on The Jack Benny Program), Jim Jordan (Fibber McGee & Molly), Dennis Day, George Fenneman (Groucho Marx's sidekick for You Bet Your Life), and Edgar Bergen---discussed highlights of their radio careers.

==== Stage ====
Stone's debut on Broadway came in Treasure Island. His other Broadway acting credits include O Evening Star, January Thaw, Tom Sawyer, Brother Rat, Horse Fever, The Alchemist, She Stoops to Conquer, and This Is The Army. His directing credits included Curtains Up!, Me and Molly, and At War With the Army.

Stone was a founding member of the American College Theatre Festival.

==== Producing ====
Over 18 years, Stone produced 200 films for motivational and training use by IBM. In 1961, he produced the television series The Hathaways.

In 1963 Stone directed the filming of a joint project between IBM, NIH, and M. D. Anderson Hospital's Department of Experimental Anesthesiology. The project was developing a monitoring system for a patient undergoing surgery. The main objectives were to keep the anesthesiologist informed of the patient's vital signs and to detect the patient's tendency toward shock. In one scene a computer technician played the role of a patient in surgery while an IBM representative played the role of surgeon, holding a scalpel over the patient's bare midsection. During the filming, the technician asked Stone to tell the cameraman "end of scene" instead of "cut", fearing the IBM rep might get carried away. The comment did get quite a laugh and Stone later passed the story on to Hedda Hopper who added it to her newspaper column. The name of the technician was Loren Block who was attending U of H while working full-time at the hospital.

==== Military service ====
Stone was a member of the Army's Special Services unit during World War II.

=== Personal life and death ===
Ezra Stone and his actress wife Sara Seegar were married for 48 years until her death in 1990. They resided in Bucks County, Pennsylvania. Four years after Seegar's death, Stone was fatally injured in a car accident near Perth Amboy, New Jersey, at age 76. His ashes were interred, along with those of his wife, at Washington Crossing National Cemetery in Newtown, Pennsylvania, in 2013.

The Stones had a son, Joseph, and a daughter, Francine.

==== Recognition ====
Stone has a star at 1634 Vine Street in the Radio section of the Hollywood Walk of Fame. It was dedicated on February 8, 1960.

== Filmography ==
Year	Title	Role	Notes
1940	Those Were the Days!	Alexander 'Allie' Bangs	
1943	This Is the Army	M / Sgt. Ezra Stone	
