= Leila Ernst =

American actress (1920–1970)

- Ernst in 1943
- Born: July 28, 1920; Jaffrey, New Hampshire, U.S.
- Died: May 26, 1970 (aged 49)
- Occupation: Actress
- Years active: 1939–1946
- Spouse(s): James Veitch; Stacy B. Hulse Jr.

Leila Ernst (July 28, 1920 – May 26, 1970) was an American actress. Her Broadway debut was in the 1939 production Too Many Girls. She also had a role in the film Life with Henry.

== Early life ==
Ernst was born on July 28, 1920, in Jaffrey, New Hampshire. She had two younger brothers. She attended school in Europe and according to her, "I'd probably been better off in a school right here at home." Her family did not approve of her becoming an actress, enrolling in a drama school, and joining the Mercury Theater Group. Ernst did multiple jobs including nailing scenery and delivering posters by driving the company's Ford Model T.

== Career ==
Her first role was in the 1939 Broadway production Too Many Girls, directed by George Abbott. Ernst said that she tried to have an audition for Abbott for months, but that Abbott had trouble arranging it. Actor Eddie Bracken said that he would tell Abbott about her after hearing her sing and he later sent a note to Ernst which stated that Abbott did not want to see her, but for her to come anyway. With the help of a stage carpenter who played the piano for her and encouragement from Bracken to run out there, Ernst barged into a dance audition that Abbott was holding to sing and dance for him. Abbott gave Ernst the role and she signed a contract for $40 a week for Too Many Girls.

Two months after her role in Too Many Girls, Paramount Pictures asked her to travel to Hollywood for a screen test for a role in a then untitled film in the Henry Aldrich film series. The screen test cost $1,200 and had a film crew of 24. It had no audio. Ernst and Jackie Cooper were told by the director Theodore Reed to ad lib as if there were no film crew surrounding them. She starred in the 1941 film Life with Henry directed by Reed which was the second film in the Henry Aldrich film series.

Despite only appearing in one film, Paramount Pictures originally intended to "invest a lot of money in Leila and give her the same kind of build-up that Warner Bros. gave Ann Sheridan."

Leila Ernst died in 1970. She is buried in Jaffrey, New Hampshire. She was pre-deceased by her husband, James Veitch. She had previously been married to Stacy B. Hulse Jr.

== Broadway roles ==
Title	Year(s)	Role	Theatre	Notes	Ref(s)
Too Many Girls	1939–1940	Tallulah Lou	Imperial Theatre	October 18, 1939 – February 11, 1940	
Pal Joey	1940–1941	Linda English	Ethel Barrymore Theatre	December 25, 1940 – August 16, 1941	
Truckline Cafe	1946	Sissie	Belasco Theatre	February 27 – March 9	
If The Shoe Fits	1946	Cinderella	New Century Theatre	December 5–21	
