= Katharine Raht =

American actress (1901–1983)

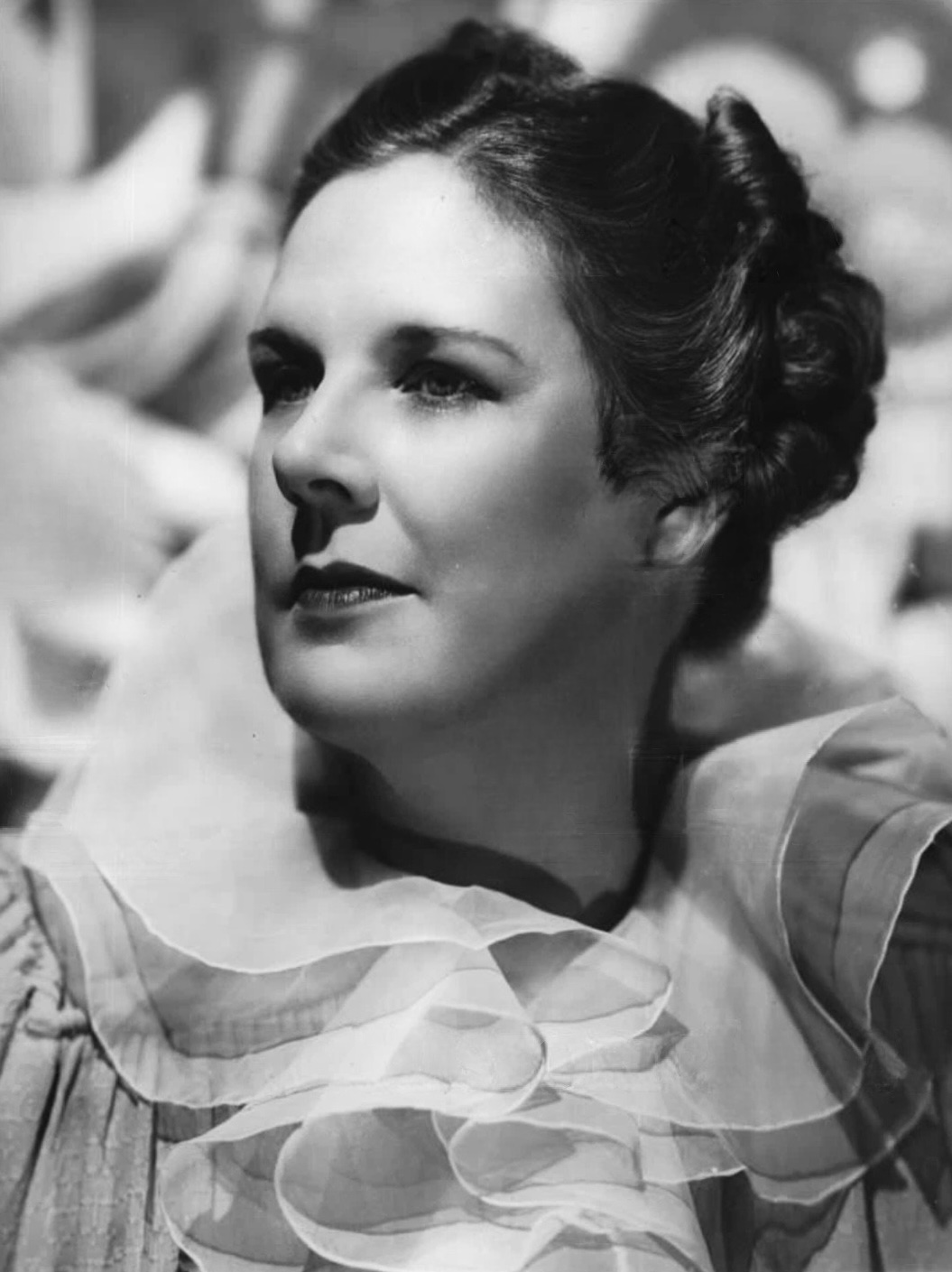
- Raht in 1940
- Born: May 8, 1901; Chattanooga, Tennessee, U.S.
- Died: December 2, 1983 (aged 82); Chattanooga, Tennessee, U.S.
- Other name: Kay Raht
- Education: Bryn Mawr College
- Occupation: Actress
- Years active: 1938–1969

Katharine "Kay" Raht (May 8, 1901 – December 2, 1983) was an American character actress of radio, stage and screen, best known as the longtime radio voice of Mrs. Alice Aldrich, mother of Henry Aldrich, in the radio show The Aldrich Family.

== Early life and career ==
Born and raised in Chattanooga, Tennessee, Raht was the daughter of Kate Mears Edmiston and prominent wool manufacturer Charles Augustus Raht, and the granddaughter of mining engineer Julius Eckhardt Raht. She attended the Shipley School and Bryn Mawr College, where she earned both her Bachelor and Master of Arts degrees, in 1923 and 24, respectively.

Following her graduation, Raht spent the better part of the 1920s and thirties teaching French at Foxcroft School in Middleburg, Virginia and at the University of Chattanooga, school years preceding occasional forays into summer stock. Finally, in 1937, prior to launching her acting career in earnest, Raht put in several months' work with Bob Porterfield's Barter Theatre (an experience she later described as "better training than any acting school"), including roles in Frederick Jackson's The Long Night and actor/director John Cromwell's Alice.

=== The Aldrich Family ===
In 1938, what began as a small, non-speaking role in the Broadway production of Thornton Wilder's Our Town, upgraded eventually to understudy—and, later still, replacement— for Evelyn Varden, as Mrs. Julia Gibbs, led in turn to a successful audition for what, over nearly a decade and a half, became Raht's signature role as Aldrich Family matriarch Alice Aldrich. (Mrs. Aldrich is the wife of Sam, mother of Henry and Mary, and, most notably, the family member whose "stentorian" summons—"Hen-ry-y-y-y?! Hen-ry Aldrich!"—opens each episode, eliciting the equally iconic response, "Coming, Mother," from the show's young protagonist.) During World War II, Raht served for two years as senior hostess at the Stage Door Canteen, where visiting GIs were especially appreciative of the running gag regarding her "three sons named Henry"—those being Ezra Stone, Norman Tokar, and Dick Jones, each of the three "Henry Aldriches" who had performed alongside Raht before himself joining the armed services. In total, Raht numbered among her Aldrich offspring at least five Henrys—the aforementioned plus Raymond Ives and Bobby Ellis—as well as six Marys, including Jone Allison, Charita Bauer, Betty Field, Ann Lincoln, Mary Mason, and Patricia Peardon.

One irony regarding the show is that neither Raht nor her Aldrich spouse House Jameson—these being the most frequently featured of Aldrich Family parents (and the ones who, as a result, received parenting-related correspondence)—had, in real life, been a parent; indeed, Raht had never married.

=== Theater ===
In the fall of 1956, struck by what would prove her penultimate Broadway appearance, several critics drew attention to Raht's brief but impactful contribution as Aunt Mary Drexel in the biographical comedy The Happiest Millionaire, starring Walter Pidgeon as Anthony Joseph Drexel Biddle. Commending both her work and that of fellow cast member Ruth White—as "the formidable and caustic Mrs. Benjamin Duke"—was the Cleveland Plain Dealer's William F. McDermott, who then noted that "in the similar role of Aunt Mary Drexel, Katharine Raht moves with the authority of a battleship in a fleet of rowboats." Likewise noting that similarity was Boston Globe critic Cyrus Durgin, whose observation is tinged with regret.

Katharine Raht as old Aunt Mary Drexel is well-matched with Ruth White as the sharp-spoken and domineering Mrs. Duke. A pity the two could not have had a whole scene of venomous conversation with each other.

An amusing—albeit initially concerning—Millionaire sidelight, pitting the typically indomitable Raht against a whole new 'breed' of female adversary, is recounted by entertainment writer Dorothy Kilgallen.

[D]uring rehearsals in New York an alligator handbag tied to a stick had served as a substitute for the real thing so often that the actress quite forgot she would eventually be confronted by a genuine 'gator. When Abigail, a six-foot long, 200-pound, utterly repulsive creature writhed on stage on cue, Miss Raht delivered her line, "Don't you dare!", gulped, and fainted dead away.

== Personal life and death ==
An only child who lost her mother at age nine and her father twenty years later, Raht never married and, whether by design or happenstance, she appears to have all but flown under the radar of the entertainment/gossip columnists. That said, she did maintain at least some ties to her birthplace and her extended family, specifically her cousin, Mrs. Charles Scott Thomas (née Louise Raht Llewellyn). In addition, Raht did at least briefly reside with fellow stage and radio actress Dorothy Sands. Self-described "partner" and "head" on their respective 1940 U.S. Census form entries, the roommates did eventually collaborate professionally on at least one substantial project, when, in April 1943, both Raht and Sands were added to the regular cast of the NBC serial Snow Village Sketches.

Raht died in December 1983 at age 82 in her home town of Chattanooga, Tennessee.

== Works ==
=== Plays ===
Plays
Year	Play	Role	Theater	Notes
1938	Our Town	People of the Town; Lady in the Box	Henry Miller's Theatre; Morosco Theatre	February 4, 1938 – February 12, 1938; February 14, 1938 - November 19, 1938
1947	The Heiress	Elizabeth Almond	Biltmore Theatre	September 29, 1947 - September 18, 1948
1950	The Heiress	Elizabeth Almond	City Center	Jan 9, 1947 – May 17, 1947
1953	Sabrina Fair	Margaret	National Theatre; Royale Theatre	November 11, 1953 – May 15, 1954; May 17, 1954 – August 21, 1954
1956	The Happiest Millionaire	Aunt Mary Drexel	Lyceum Theatre	November, 1956 – July 13, 1957
1963	Love and Kisses	Nanny	Music Box Theatre	December 18, 1963 – December 28, 1963

=== TV appearances ===
TV
TV Show	Role	Episode	Year
Studio One	Mrs. Otherly (as Katherine Raht)		1952
Westinghouse Theatre		"The Shadowy Third"	1952
Robert Montgomery Presents	Mrs. Grady (as Katherine Raht)	"Appointment in Samara"	1953
Rocky King, Detective			1953
The Web		"Death Has Nine Lives"	1954
The Man Behind the Badge	Customer	"The Cleveland Story"	1954
The Man Behind the Badge	(as Katharine Baht)	"The Case of the Berkshire Fires"	1954
The Mail Story		"Dead Letters"	1954
Armstrong Circle Theatre		"Trapped"	1955
Ethel and Albert		Ep. 4.2	1955
The Way of the World		Ep. airing June 27, 1955	1955
The Way of the World		Ep. airing June 28, 1955	1955
The Way of the World		Ep. airing June 29, 1955	1955
The Way of the World		Ep. airing June 30, 1955	1955
The Way of the World		Ep. airing July 1, 1955	1955
The Goldbergs	Mrs. Fuller (as Katherine Raht)		1955
Ford Star Jubilee		"This Happy Breed"	1956
Robert Montgomery Presents	Aggie (as Katherine Raht)	"All Expenses Paid"	1956
Hallmark Hall of Fame	Sister Inez	"Cradle Song"	1956
The Goldbergs	Genevieve Lubitsch	"Molly's Fish"	1956
The Dupont Show of the Month	Mrs. Chauvenet (as Katherine Raht)	"Harvey"	1958
Hallmark Hall of Fame	Anne Marie (as Katherine Raht)	"A Doll's House"	1959
Children of Strangers	Mrs. Fuller		1959
The Play of the Week		"The Grass Harp"	1960
Hallmark Hall of Fame	Sister Inez	"Cradle Song"	1960
Frontiers of Faith	Matron	"The Priest"	1966
Winter of the Witch	Mrs. Butterwaite		1969
