= Sara Seegar =

American actress (1914–1990)

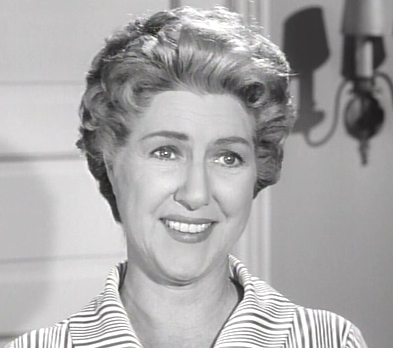
- Born: Sarah Wall Seegar; July 1, 1914; Greentown, Indiana, U.S.
- Died: August 12, 1990 (aged 76); Langhorne, Pennsylvania, U.S.
- Other names: Sarah Wall Seegar
- Occupation: Actress
- Years active: 1937–1979
- Spouse: Ezra Stone (m. 1942)
- Children: 2
- Relatives: Miriam Seegar (sister)

Sara Seegar (born Sarah Wall Seegar; July 1, 1914 – August 12, 1990) was an American actress. A performer on stage, film, radio, and television, she may best be remembered for her role as Mrs. Wilson in the 1962–63 season of Dennis the Menace.

== Early life ==
Seegar was born to Frank and Carrie (née Wall) Seegar in Greentown, Indiana, the youngest of five daughters. She was schooled in London and Paris but ultimately graduated from Hollywood High School, where she participated in dramatic and musical productions. She received a degree in drama from Los Angeles Junior College, where she participated in stage productions.

Her older sisters were Dr. Helen Seegar Stone (1895–1976), an educator; Dorothy Seegar (1897–1999), actress and singer; Mildred (1905–1913), and Miriam Seegar (1907–2011), also an actress. Following school, Seegar performed on stage in London, starting her career with Three Men on a Horse. She continued performing in London until the start of World War II, at which point she returned to the United States.

== Career ==
Starting in 1940, Seegar performed in Broadway plays, in film, on radio and on television. She played Elsie on Room for One More, was a regular on The Red Buttons Show and appeared as a character actor on television throughout the 1950s and 1960s, with roles on Suspense, Perry Mason, and The Donna Reed Show. She played ten different small roles on Bewitched over the course of that same series.

In the 1962–63 season of Dennis the Menace, Seegar played Eloise Wilson, the wife of John Wilson. She effectively replaced Sylvia Field, who portrayed Martha Wilson—the original "Mrs. Wilson"—from 1959 to 1962. Field left the series after the death of Joseph Kearns (George Wilson), due to George and Martha Wilson being written out of the series. Gale Gordon began playing John Wilson, George's brother, after Kearns' death. She also had a part in the movie version of "The Music Man" with Robert Preston and Shirley Jones.

== Personal life ==
Sara Seegar met Ezra Stone while the two were performing in Horse Fever on Broadway in 1940. They were married on October 5, 1942. They had two children: a son, Josef Seegar Stone (1944–2010) and a daughter, Francine Lida Stone.

== Death ==
Sara Seegar Stone died on August 12, 1990, of a cerebral hemorrhage at St. Mary's Hospital in Langhorne, Pennsylvania; her ashes were interred at Washington Crossing National Cemetery, along with those of her husband, in a ceremony in 2013.

== Performances ==
=== Broadway ===
- Horse Fever (1940) - Milly Flynn
- Vickie (1942) - Mrs. Corliss/Assistant Stage Manager
- At War with the Army (1949) - Mrs. Caldwell

=== Off-Broadway ===
- Ernest in Love (1960) - Lady Bracknell

=== Radio ===
- The Aldrich Family

=== Film ===
- The Last Curtain (1937) - Molly
- Smash and Grab (1937) - Miss Quincey
- Dead Men Tell No Tales (1938) - Marjorie
- Mr. Reeder in Room 13 (1938) - Lila Legge
- The Shrike (1955) - Mrs. Cory (uncredited)
- The Music Man (1962) - Mrs. Maud Dunlop

=== Television ===
- The Andy Griffith Show (1960–1962) - Mrs. Katherine Palmer / Gossip on Telephone / Mrs. Buntley
- Dennis the Menace (1962–1963) - Eloise Wilson
- Bewitched (1964–1972) - Cora Mae Franklin / Mrs. Prescott / Mrs. Meiklejohn / Mrs. Nickerson / Mrs. Wehmeyer / Edna Durfee / Emily Hascomb / Agnes Baker / Mrs. Springer / Mrs. Grange
- The Cara Williams Show (1965), episode "Anywhere I Hang My Hat Is Home" – Miss Loren
- The Brady Bunch (1972) - Miss Bailey
- The Jeffersons (1978) - Mrs. Pomeroy
