= What a Life (film) =

1939 film by Theodore Reed

- Theatrical release poster
- Directed by: Theodore Reed
- Screenplay by: Charles Brackett; Billy Wilder; Clifford Goldsmith (play)
- Produced by: Theodore Reed
- Starring: Jackie Cooper; Betty Field; John Howard; Janice Logan; Vaughan Glaser; Lionel Stander; Hedda Hopper
- Cinematography: Victor Milner
- Edited by: William Shea
- Music by: John Leipold
- Production company: Paramount Pictures
- Distributed by: Paramount Pictures
- Release date: October 6, 1939
- Running time: 75 minutes
- Country: United States
- Language: English

What a Life is a 1939 American comedy film directed by Theodore Reed and starring Jackie Cooper, Betty Field, John Howard, Janice Logan, Vaughan Glaser, Lionel Stander, and Hedda Hopper. Written by Charles Brackett and Billy Wilder, the film was released on October 6, 1939, by Paramount Pictures.

This is the first in a series of eleven Henry Aldrich films (1939–1944) based on the leading character from the radio series The Aldrich Family

== Plot ==
Henry (Jackie Cooper) is falsely accused of making trouble at school. He must clear himself.

== Cast ==
- Jackie Cooper as Henry Aldrich
- Betty Field as Barbara Pearson
- John Howard as Mr. Nelson
- Janice Logan as Miss Shea
- Vaughan Glaser as J.C. Bradley
- Lionel Stander as Ferguson
- Fred Niblo as Mr. Aldrich
- Hedda Hopper as Mrs. Aldrich
- James Corner as George Bigelow
- Dorothy Stickney as Miss Wheeler
- Kathleen Lockhart as Miss Pike
- Lucien Littlefield as Mr. Patterson
- Sidney Miller as Pinkie Peters
- Andrew Tombes as Professor Abernathy
- George Guhl as Janitor
- Arthur Aylesworth as MacGowan
- Wilda Bennett as Miss Doolittle
- Benny Bartlett as 'Butch' Williams
- Kay Stewart as Marjorie
- Leonard Sues as Harold Lambrey
- Edwin Brian as Don Bray
- Janet Waldo as Gwen
- Sheila Ryan as Jessie
- Douglas Fahy as Tony Milligan
- Roberta Smith as Gertie
- Nora Cecil as Miss Eggleston
- Inna Gest as Student
