= Queen of the Jungle =

- Directed by: Robert F. Hill; Glenn Cook (asst.)
- Written by: Griffin Jay
- Produced by: H.A. Wohl
- Edited by: Carl Himm
- Music by: Hal Chasnoff
- Distributed by: Screen Attractions
- Release date: 1935
- Running time: 12 chapters (197 minutes) (serial); 65 minutes (film)
- Country: United States
- Language: English

Queen of the Jungle is a 1935 independent film serial produced by Herman Wohl and released theatrically by Screen Attractions.

== Plot ==
David Worth travels into Africa to find his old friend Joan Lawrence, who disappeared in a hot air balloon as a child while the pair were with an expedition searching for radium deposits. Unknown to David, she was discovered by an African tribe and became their queen.

== Cast ==
- Reed Howes as David Worth
- Mary Kornman as Joan Lawrence
- Marilyn Spinner as Joan Lawrence (as a child)
- Dickie Jones as David Worth (as a child)
- William J. Wals as John Lawrence
- Lafe McKee as Kali
- Zack Williams as Garu
- Eddie Foster as Rocco

== Production ==
Most of the action footage in this serial came from the 1922 silent serial The Jungle Goddess, a co-production by William N. Selig Productions and Warner Bros., for financial reasons, and the same script was used, with the principal actors in the new scenes made up and costumed on indoor jungle mockups to match the old outdoor footage. Naturally, considering the changes in filming and dramatic technique that had taken place over 13 years, plus the fact that silent films were projected at a different speed than sound films, this resulted in several continuity errors.

== Release ==
=== Theatrical ===
Screen Attractions released Queen of the Jungle in 1935 as both a 12-chapter serial and a 65-min feature film.

The film was given an international release, being released in Brazil under the title A Rainha do Sertão ("Queen of the Sertão").

== Chapter titles ==
1. Lost in the Clouds
2. Radium Rays
3. The Hand of Death
4. The Natives' Revenge
5. Black Magic
6. The Death Vine
7. The Leopard Leaps
8. The Doom Ship
9. Death Rides the Wave
10. The Temple of Mu
11. Fangs in the Dark
12. The Pit of the Lions

_{Source:}

== See also ==
- List of film serials by year
- List of film serials by studio

Preceded by Mystery of the River Boat (1944)	Universal Serial; Jungle Queen (1945)	Succeeded by The Master Key (1945)
