= Requiem for a Gunfighter =

1965 film by Spencer Gordon Bennet

- Theatrical release poster
- Directed by: Spencer Gordon Bennet
- Produced by: Alex Gordon
- Starring: Rod Cameron; Stephen McNally; Mike Mazurki; Olive Sturgess; Dick Jones
- Cinematography: Frederick West
- Edited by: Charles Powell
- Music by: Ronald Stein
- Production company: Premiere Productions
- Distributed by: Embassy Pictures
- Release date: June 30, 1965
- Running time: 91 minutes
- Country: United States
- Language: English

Requiem for a Gunfighter is a 1965 American Western film, the last film directed by Spencer Gordon Bennet, produced by Alex Gordon, and starring Rod Cameron, Stephen McNally, Mike Mazurki, Dick Jones (in his final film role before his death in 2014), and Olive Sturgess.

== Cast ==
- Rod Cameron as Dave McCloud
- Stephen McNally as Red Zimmer
- Mike Mazurki as Ivy Bliss
- Olive Sturgess as Bonnie Young
- Dick Jones as Cliff Fletcher
- Tim McCoy as Judge Irving Short
- Chet Douglas as Larry Young
- Bob Steele as Max Smith
- Johnny Mack Brown as Enkoff
- Chris Hughes as Billy Parker

== See also ==
- List of American films of 1965
