= Say! Young Fellow =

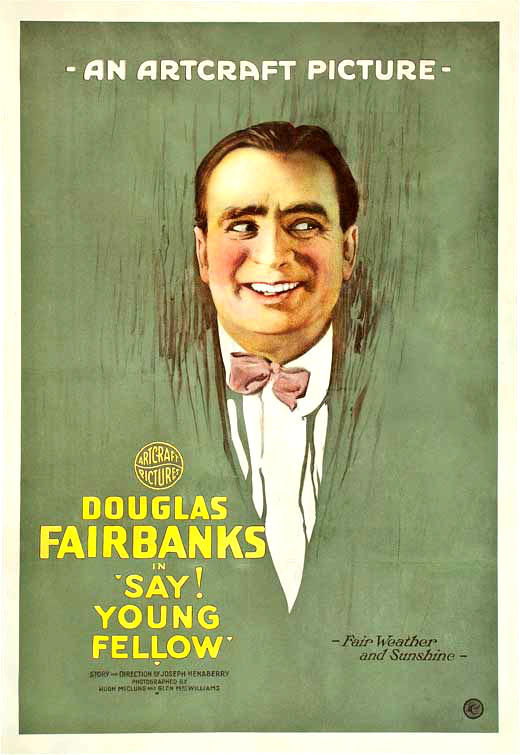
- Film poster
- Directed by: Joseph Henabery
- Written by: Joseph Henabery (scenario); Theodore Reed (intertitles)
- Produced by: Douglas Fairbanks
- Starring: Douglas Fairbanks
- Cinematography: Hugh McClung; Glen MacWilliams
- Production company: Douglas Fairbanks Pictures
- Distributed by: Famous Players–Lasky/Artcraft
- Release date: June 16, 1918
- Running time: 50 minutes
- Country: United States
- Languages: Silent; English intertitles

Say! Young Fellow was a 1918 American silent romantic comedy film produced by and starring Douglas Fairbanks and distributed by Famous Players–Lasky /Artcraft. The picture was directed by Joseph Henabery. The film is now considered lost.

== Cast ==
- Douglas Fairbanks as The Young Fellow
- Marjorie Daw as The Girl
- Frank Campeau as The Villain
- Edythe Chapman as A Sweet Spinster
- James Neill as A Kindly Bachelor
- Ernest Butterworth as Undetermined Role

== See also ==
- List of lost films
