= Olive Sturgess =

Canadian actress (1933–2025)

- Born: October 8, 1933; Ocean Falls, British Columbia, Canada
- Died: February 19, 2025 (aged 91); Los Angeles, California, U.S.
- Occupation: Actress
- Relatives: Joan Benham (cousin)

Olive Dora Sturgess (October 8, 1933 – February 19, 2025) was a Canadian actress who worked in American film, television, and theatre during the 1950s and 1960s.

== Early life ==
Sturgess was born on October 8, 1933, Ocean Falls, British Columbia, Canada, and raised in Vancouver. Her father, Leonard Sturgess, hosted his own radio show. She came to Hollywood in 1954 and attended Whittier College.

== Film ==
Sturgess was signed to Universal Studios in her early 20s. She had a supporting role in the comedy film The Kettles in the Ozarks (1956), which was the ninth instalment of Universal Pictures's Ma and Pa Kettle series. She played Ma's daughter Nancy Kettle. She played Estelle Craven in Roger Corman's comedy horror film The Raven (1963) starring Vincent Price, Peter Lorre, Boris Karloff, and Jack Nicholson. She appeared as Bonnie Young in the Western film Requiem for a Gunfighter (1965) starring Rod Cameron.

== Television ==
Sturgess appeared in dozens of television series from 1955 to 1974, beginning with an episode of the anthology series Studio 57 titled "Take My Hand." Other series include The Millionaire (1955), The People's Choice with Jackie Cooper, Front Row Center, The Red Skelton Hour, Tales of Wells Fargo with Dale Robertson, The Donna Reed Show, Cheyenne, Sugarfoot with Will Hutchins, Rawhide, Have Gun - Will Travel, Wagon Train, Hawaiian Eye, Perry Mason, Maverick with Roger Moore, Thriller S2:E10 with Boris Karloff, Checkmate with Sebastian Cabot and Doug McClure, Petticoat Junction with Edgar Buchanan, The Virginian, Bonanza, The Girl from U.N.C.L.E. and Ironside with Raymond Burr. She also appeared in episodes of The Tall Man starring Clu Gulager with Judy Nugent as one of Andy Clyde's nefarious daughters.

After a final role in the ABC police drama The Rookies in 1974, she gave up acting a to raise her daughter, Amy.

== Personal life and death ==
Sturgess was married to musician Dale Anderson. She died in Los Angeles on February 19, 2025, at the age of 91.

Sturgess' cousin was English actress Joan Benham.
