= Life with Henry =

1941 film by Theodore Reed

- Theatrical release poster
- Directed by: Theodore Reed
- Screenplay by: Clifford Goldsmith; Don Hartman
- Story by: Clifford Goldsmith; Don Hartman
- Produced by: Theodore Reed
- Starring: Jackie Cooper; Leila Ernst; Eddie Bracken; Fred Niblo; Hedda Hopper; Kay Stewart
- Cinematography: Leo Tover
- Edited by: William Shea
- Music by: Friedrich Hollaender
- Production company: Paramount Pictures
- Distributed by: Paramount Pictures
- Release date: January 24, 1941
- Running time: 80 minutes
- Country: United States
- Language: English

Life with Henry is a 1941 American comedy film directed by Theodore Reed and written by Clifford Goldsmith and Don Hartman. The film stars Jackie Cooper, Leila Ernst, Eddie Bracken, Fred Niblo, Hedda Hopper and Kay Stewart. It was released on January 24, 1941, by Paramount Pictures.

== Plot ==
Henry Aldrich needs to raise $100 to win a trip to Alaska, so he tries to raise money by making and selling soap with his friend Dizzy. Following the disastrous venture, Henry must find another way to win the trip.

== Cast ==
- Jackie Cooper as Henry Aldrich
- Leila Ernst as Kathleen Anderson
- Eddie Bracken as 'Dizzy' Stevens
- Fred Niblo as Mr. Aldrich
- Hedda Hopper as Mrs. Aldrich
- Kay Stewart as Mary Aldrich
- Moroni Olsen as Sylvanus Q. Sattherwaite
- Rod Cameron as Bill Van Dusen
- Pierre Watkin as Mr. Anderson
- Lucien Littlefield as Mr. Stevens
- Frank M. Thomas as Joe Nye
- Etta McDaniel as Kleopatra 'Kleo' Johnson
- Adrian Morris as Reporter

== Reception ==
Bosley Crowther of The New York Times characterized the film as "pleasant family entertainment."
