= House Jameson =

American actor (1902–1971)

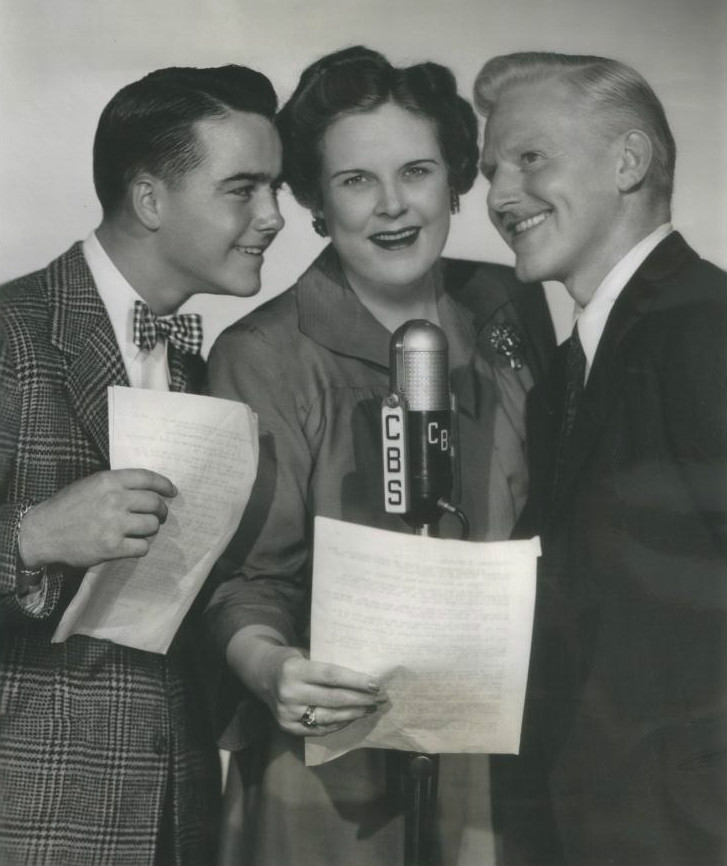
- November 1944 photo from the radio program The Aldrich Family. From left: Dick Jones (Henry Aldrich), Katharine Raht (Mrs. Aldrich) and House Jameson (Mr. Aldrich).
- Born: December 17, 1902; Austin, Texas, U.S.
- Died: April 23, 1971 (aged 68); Danbury, Connecticut, U.S.
- Occupation: Actor
- Known for: Playing Sam Aldrich in The Aldrich Family
- Spouse(s): Edith Taliaferro (1928(?) – 1958; her death); Elizabeth Mears (19??–1971; his death)

House Baker Jameson (December 17, 1902 – April 23, 1971) was an American actor in the era of old-time radio and early television.

== Early years ==
Jameson was a native of Austin, Texas. He was named for Edward M. House, a political figure who was a friend of the family. He graduated from Columbia University. Jameson said that he knew at age 5 that he wanted to be an actor, when an aunt, who raised him after his father died, took him to see a performance of The Shepherd King. Jameson told TV Guide that after the family returned home, he "absolutely refused to go to bed until the family rustled up some costumes and re-enacted the play."

== Radio ==
Jameson broke into radio in the early 1930s, as an announcer with WEVD. Jameson admired a WEVD announcer named Roland Bradley in Chicago, and wrote him a letter telling him so. This led to a friendship and an invitation to occasionally pinch-hit as an announcer. Bradley left WEVD, and in 1934, Jameson was named chief announcer and dramatic director.

Jameson soon became known for his leading roles in Renfrew of the Mounted and Crime Doctor. Renfrew was an adventure story based on the novels and stories by Laurie York Erskine, and was aimed at a juvenile audience. Jameson played Inspector Douglas Renfrew, a Canadian Mountie, from 1936 to 1940. The show was so popular at one point that, after a single offer of a photograph of Jameson in full Renfrew regalia, it received 17,000 requests. In an episode of Behind the Mike, Jameson recounted the case of a boy who recovered from a serious illness after receiving a telegram and an autographed photo from "Renfrew." The boy's brother had contacted Jameson at home to ask for his assistance.

Jameson appeared on Crime Doctor from 1940 to 1947, taking over the lead role of Dr. Benjamin Ordway (replacing Everett Sloane) in 1944.

Jameson's best-known role was as father Sam Aldrich in the comedy The Aldrich Family. In January 1953, newspaper columnist Richard Kleiner wrote about House Jameson, who played Mr. Aldrich in the radio comedy, "Mr. Jameson, a handsome, white-haired gentleman with a handsome white-haired mustache, is making a career out of being father to a perennial high school junior called Henry Aldrich." He played that role on the radio program 1939 - 1953. In 1968, Jameson noted that the show was popular with younger children and adults but teenagers did not like the show. Jameson said that working on the show was "the happiest acting experience" he ever had and he still missed it. He said that there was never any personality conflicts among the actors, crediting the leadership of its star, Ezra Stone. Jameson and Stone indicated that they developed a father/son relationship in real-life that continued after the show ended.

Jameson's other roles in radio programs included those shown in the table below.

Program	Role
Brave Tomorrow	Whit Davis
Crime Doctor	Dr. Ordway
Inner Sanctum Mystery	Host
Renfrew of the Royal Mounted	Renfrew
Young Widder Jones (Brown)	Herb Temple

Jameson was also heard on Columbia Presents Corwin, So This Is Radio, Behind the Mike, Americans At Work; On Broadway, Canary Christmas, Eno Crime Clues, Hilda Hope, M.D., Snow Village, Betty and Bob, Our Gal Sunday, Mystery Theatre, By Kathleen Norris,Grand Central Station, This Day Is Ours, The Jack Benny Show, A Special Announcement, World Service, Brave Tomorrow, Words Without Music, Voice of the Army, New York Philharmonic Orchestra, Cresta Blanca Carnival, Ellen Randolph; Nazi Eyes On Canada, This Is War, The Nightingale and the Rose (as Narrator), American Portrait, Building for Peace, FBI In Peace and War, Day of Reckoning (play), Quaker World Service, Colgate Theater of Romance, Quick as a Flash, The Radio Edition of the Bible, The Eternal Light, Radio Playhouse, Hilltop House, Pepper Young's Family, Mrs. Wiggins Cabbage Patch, Portia Faces Life, The Kate Smith Show, Suspense, X Minus One, and Cavalcade of America.

Jameson was "greatly admired" by writer Norman Corwin, who "found him to be a reliable performer, a man of modesty, who had a sense of dignity, without being stiff." Jameson appeared in a number of Corwin's productions, as actor and narrator, including The Plot to Overthrow Christmas (as Santa Claus), They Fly Through the Air, Seems Radio Is Here To Stay, There Will Be Time Later, Log of the R-77, A Soliloquy to Balance the Budget, Descent of the Gods (as Apollo), Fragments From a Lost Cause, America at War, and A Program to Be Opened in a Hundred Years. In They Fly and Soliloquy, Jameson was the sole performer. Corwin wrote several scripts with Jameson in mind. Jameson's voice was described as "a magnificently mellow instrument[,]" and Jameson was said to be "a master of language cadences" and to have "a fine gift for irony." The roles Corwin wrote for Jameson "tend[ed] toward an elaborate style, with an Olympian quality about them." In a January 27, 1969, letter to Jameson, Corwin stated "[i]f I was the father of those breakthrough plays, you were the godfather. There might have been others who could have played Santa in The Plot as well as you, though for the life of me I cannot think who; but nobody - nobody- could have carried They Fly as you did." Corwin said They Fly was the play that made the biggest difference in his life, and told Jameson "[f]or that service alone, I would be eternally grateful to you. But it was, happily, not alone." Corwin told Jameson that he was a "rock." Corwin stated that "[k]nowing your rich mind and the grace and power of your art, I was emboldened to write for you as a composer writes for an instrumentalist whose range and qualities broaden his own by giving him the confidence to reach high."

In 1943, Variety named Jameson as one of the top earners in radio, making $50,000 or more, per year.

Jameson stated that he left the stage to work in radio because of the easier work schedule that enabled him to spend more time with his wife on their farm in Connecticut. He noted the minimal amount of time required to rehearse and perform a radio program, enabling him to work on several shows per week, and still keep a normal schedule. Jameson estimated that he had done thousands of radio shows, many of which he had forgotten.

== Stage ==
Jameson made his first Broadway appearance in 1924, when he was cast as a spear carrier in the Theatre Guild production of Saint Joan. Also in 1924, Jameson appeared on Broadway in the Grand Street Follies, satirizing Will Rogers. He was chosen for the role because of his Texas background. Jameson stated, however, that "[he] was a big-city boy from Texas and had hardly ever seen a lariat before." He said that he "rushed home, used a clothesline and practiced spinning a rope all night," to prepare for the part. In 1925, Jameson co-starred in the original Garrick Gaieties, a music review by Richard Rodgers and Lorenz Hart. One of the sketches was a burlesque of They Knew What They Wanted, with Jameson playing Tony and impersonating Richard Bennett (actor).

Later in 1925, Jameson toured for a year in the Julia Arthur production of Saint Joan, playing the role of Gilles De Rais. Hi Jameson then spent nearly a year in Chicago, and then joined the Toronto Theatre Guild in 1927/1928 for a similar length of time. In Toronto, he played in productions of A Kiss for Cinderella, The Second Mrs. Tanqueray, Diplomacy, What Every Woman Knows, Bunty Pulls the Strings, and Quality Street. Several of the plays starred Jameson's wife, Edith Taliaferro, who was already a well-known stage actress, while Jameson appeared in supporting roles.

For the 1928/1929 season, Jameson was a member of Minneapolis' Bainbridge Players. Taliaferro was a guest star during the same season. In Minneapolis, Jameson and Taliaferro appeared in The Garden of Eden, What Every Woman Knows, Little Old New York, Her Cardboard Lover, A Kiss for Cinderella, Broadway, Wanted, Two Girls Wanted, The Mad Honeymoon, Lulu Belle, Baby Cyclone, Behold the Bridegroom, The Shannons of Broadway, and If I Was Rich.

In 1930, Jameson and Taliaferro toured Australia together for more than six months, with Taliaferro as the headliner and Jameson as the juvenile lead, appearing in Let Us Be Gay, The Garden of Eden, The Road to Romance, Coquette, and Peg O' My Heart.

In 1931, Jameson and Taliaferro toured the Southern and Midwestern U.S., appearing in Private Lives, with Taliaferro again playing the lead female character and Jameson playing the supporting male character.

In 1961–1962, Jameson co-starred in the national tour of Advise and Consent, playing Senator Seab Cooley, garnering excellent reviews. One critic said that Jameson deserved "top honors" for his portrayal, and that his "changes of mood, his rapid shifts of characterization fitting the part he defines were a joy to watch;" while the Los Angeles Times said that he was a "real stand out." Another critic said that "there was no moment when Jameson was on the stage that did not belong unquestionably to him. His is the timing and gratifying authority that comes of experience and understanding. . . Jameson was simply a wow from the moment of his first line to his last."

Jameson's other Broadway credits include The Goat Song (1925), The Chief Thing (1925), An American Tragedy (1926), The Dark Hours (1932), We, the People (1932), In Time to Come (1941), The Patriots (1942), Requiem for a Nun (1959), The Great Indoors (1965), and Don't Drink the Water (1966).

== Film ==
Jameson was seen in The Naked City (1948), Parrish (1961), Mirage (1965), and The Swimmer (1968).

== Television ==
Jameson reprised his role of Sam Aldrich, Henry Aldrich's father, in the television version of The Aldrich Family (1949 - 1953). According to Jameson, he was told that his white hair would not film well in those early days of television, because it "bounc[ed]," and he was advised to dye it blue. He came up with an alternative of using blue dusting powder from his make-up kit. Jameson noted that filming the TV series was much more time-consuming than working on the radio version, with many hours of rehearsals, lighting and scenic problems, and other "videosyncracies" to contend with. Jameson told Richard Lamparski that the show "did not translate well to television," and he "didn't like it very much," believing that the program was "too literal" for television. He also cited the ever-changing cast.

Jameson was also seen in Goodyear Television Playhouse (1956), "Macbeth" (a 1954 episode of Hallmark Hall of Fame), The Sacco-Vanzetti Story, Robert Montgomery Presents, The Telltale Clue (1954), KSD Summer Theater (1955), American Inventory (1955), Westinghouse Studio One (1955 and 1957), Way of the World (1955), Modern Romances (1957), The Edge of Night (as John Phillips) (1957-1958), True Story (1958), The Phil Silvers Show (1958 and 1959), New York Confidential (1959), The United States Steel Hour (1959), The Witness (1960), Naked City (multiple episodes 1958–1963), Route 66 (1960), The Play of the Week (1961), DuPont Show of the Month (1961), Car 54, Where Are You? (1961 and 1962), Camera Three (1963), Another World (as Dr. Bert Gregory) (1964), The Defenders (1964), Search for Tomorrow (as Dr. Lawson), The Trials of O'Brien (1965), "Lamp At Midnight" and "Barefoot in Athens" (Hallmark Hall of Fame productions) (1966), The Borgia Stick (TV Movie)(1967), Dark Shadows (as Judge Crathorne) (1967), Coronet Blue (1967), The Doctors (as Nathan Bunker) (1967-1968), Lamp Unto My Feet (Narrator)(1968), and N.Y.P.D. (1969).

== Professional organizations ==
Jameson was elected to The Lambs in 1936, and was also a member of the Theatre Guild in New York City, The Players in New York City, the Actors' Equity Association, and a charter member of the American Federation of Radio Artists (AFRA). He was elected President of the New York local of AFRA in 1945.

== Recognition ==
In 1942, Jameson's Sam Aldrich character was named "radio's outstanding father" by the National Father's Day Committee. In 1989, Jameson was posthumously inducted as one of four charter members of the American Foundation for the Blind Talking Book Hall of Fame.

== Personal life ==
Jameson was married to actress Edith Taliaferro, who died in 1958, and later to the former Elizabeth Mears. Jameson and Taliaferro met and were married in Toronto. Jameson and Taliaferro were married around 1928. For 35 years, he was a reader for the American Foundation for the Blind.

== Death ==
Jameson died of cancer April 23, 1971, in Danbury, Connecticut. At his request, no service was held. Cremation was in Mountain Grove Crematory in Bridgeport, Connecticut. He was survived by his wife.
