= What a Life (play) =

1938 Broadway play

- Original language: English
- Written by: Clifford Goldsmith
- Genre: Comedy
- Setting: Central High School

Premiere
- Date: April 13, 1938
- Place: Biltmore Theatre; New York City, New York

What a Life is a 1938 Broadway play by Clifford Goldsmith.

What a Life is set in Central High School, with action primarily occurring in the principal's office. The main character, Henry Aldrich, "thinks he is dumb because his father won a Phi Beta Kappa key at college." During the play, Aldrich faces charges that he caused a disturbance in class and that he stole brass instruments from the band. He also has to deal with a student who bullies him.

The play was copyrighted on July 7, 1936, under the title Enter to Learn. After some revisions, "without, however, materially changing the plot or principal characters", the title was changed to What a Life. It languished for more than one year, but things changed when producer George Abbott took charge.

== Original Broadway production ==
George Abbott produced and directed the original Broadway production, which opened April 13, 1938 at the Biltmore Theatre and ran for 538 performances. The original cast included Eddie Bracken and Butterfly McQueen. Kay Brown, talent scout for David O. Selznick, saw McQueen in this production and recommended her to Selznick. She screen tested and was cast in the role of Prissy, Scarlett's maid, in Gone With the Wind (1939).

== Revival ==
A 1982 attempted revival of What a Life at the Manhattan Punch Line failed. The production was panned in The New York Times, with reviewer Mel Gussow writing: "The play is piffle. Far funnier efforts can be seen nightly in television reruns of situation comedies. Next to What a Life, Leave It to Beaver is Moliere."

== Adaptations ==
The play was initially adapted to radio as comedy segments on Rudy Vallee's program. Next came a separate radio program, The Aldrich Family. Film adaptation came in the form of 11 motion pictures. Finally, a television series, also called The Aldrich Family, was broadcast for three seasons.
