= Theodore Reed =

Film director

- Born: June 18, 1887; Cincinnati, Ohio, USA
- Died: February 22, 1959 (aged 71); San Diego, USA
- Occupation: Film director
- Years active: 1919–1941

Theodore Reed (June 18, 1887 – February 22, 1959) was an American film director, producer and former president of the Academy of Motion Picture Arts and Sciences.

== Selected filmography ==
- Say! Young Fellow (1918)
- Arizona (1918)
- When the Clouds Roll By (1919)
- The Nut (1921)
- Lady Be Careful (1936)
- Double or Nothing (1937)
- Tropic Holiday (1938)
- What a Life (1939)
- I'm from Missouri (1939)
- Life with Henry (1941)
- Her First Beau (1941)
- Song of My Heart (1948)

Non-profit organization positions
Preceded by Conrad Nagel	President of the Academy of Motion Picture Arts and Sciences; 1933–1934	Succeeded by Frank Lloyd
