= Charita Bauer =

American actress (1923–1985)

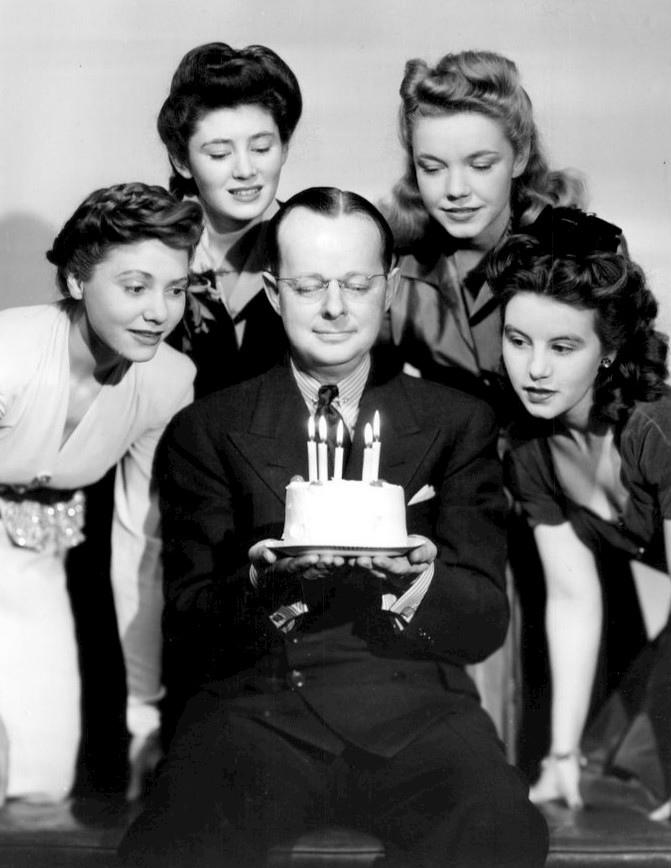
Bauer at right in 1943, celebrating the fifth anniversary of The Aldrich Family with Mary Rolfe, Ann Lincoln, Mary Shipp and creator Clifford Goldsmith. Bauer formerly played Mary Aldrich on the program.

Charita Bauer (December 20, 1923 – February 28, 1985) was an American soap opera radio and television actress.

Born in Newark, New Jersey, on December 20, 1923, she began her career at the age of eight as a model for clothing ads. Her talents included singing, playing the piano, and speaking three languages.

== Stage ==
Bauer attended the Professional Children's School in New York, and her first theater appearance was on Broadway in Thunder on the Left (1933). She was the only child actress in The Women on Broadway in 1936. By 1942, Bauer's maturity was evident as a newspaper reported, "Charita Bauer ... gets her first 'grown-up' role in a Broadway play in William Roos' Life of Reilly, which opens on Apr. 29." In 1944, she played in Good Morning, Corporal, on Broadway, with a reviewer commenting, "she's grown up and in this play has the role of a young woman ..."

== Radio ==
Bauer first appeared on radio on WPAP in New York City as a child. She was active throughout the 1930s and 1940s on numerous radio dramas of the day, including Let's Pretend, Mr. Keen, Tracer of Lost Persons. The March of Time, The FBI in Peace and War, Suspense and other programs.

She played Sarah O'Brien in Rose of My Dreams, Mary Aldrich in The Aldrich Family (a role she also played on the television version of the program) and Judy Todhunter in David Harum. Bauer also played in Second Husband, The Parker Family, and Orphans of Divorce.

On November 11, 1944, Bauer made her 2,000th radio broadcast when she appeared on Grand Central Station.

== Guiding Light ==
She played headstrong and opinionated Bertha "Bert" Miller Bauer on the long-running soap The Guiding Light on radio from 1950 to 1956 and on TV from 1952 to 1985. In 1962, Bauer was featured in one of the earliest social issue storylines on American daytime television, as her character Bert was diagnosed with uterine cancer. The storyline helped millions of women realize the importance of regular checkups and pap smear screenings. Bauer received a record amount of mail from fans.

To avoid confusion between her real life and her popular soap role, Charita asked the show's producers to name her TV son Michael after her own son Michael Crawford. (The show was aired live in the early days, and a mistake like addressing her TV son by an incorrect name would have been difficult to cover.)

While her character was a spitfire in the earlier days, by the 1970s she had been relegated to the ceremonial role of town matriarch, a role she would fill for the show for the remainder of her run. Just before Thanksgiving 1983, complications from a blood clot forced Bauer to have her leg amputated. When she returned to the show in April 1984, her character's life mirrored her own.

In the storyline, after visiting Aunt Meta in New York, Bert returned to Springfield and began experiencing pain in her leg (which had been fitted with a prosthesis by this time and mostly kept off camera). She ended up having her leg amputated just as the actress who played her had. For the first time in decades, Bert had to depend upon others to wait on her hand and foot, resulting in one of the series' most memorable stories. (Bert, sitting in a wheelchair at Cedars Hospital, told Josh Lewis, who had been paralyzed recently and had given up hope, that life itself was a miracle and never to forget it.) In a moving scene, Bert dropped a teacup. She tried to get it, but could not, and in sheer frustration, she burst into tears. As she went through rehab following her operation, camera shot closed in on her remaining leg as she learned to walk again, bringing even more realism to the storyline.

In 1983, Bauer's long-time contributions to television were honored when she received a Lifetime Achievement Award from the Academy of Television Arts and Sciences.

Bauer received a posthumous Lifetime Contribution Daytime Emmy Award that summer, along with Search for Tomorrow's Larry Haines and Mary Stuart (who in the 1990s would play Meta Bauer). Her character Bert died, and was mourned on-camera in March 1986, a full year after Charita Bauer died.

== Personal life and death ==
In 1943, Bauer married Robert Stanley Crawford, the brother of Cheryl Crawford.

Bauer died February 28, 1985, at age 62 after a long illness. She was survived by her father, her son, and her grandson.
