= Dick Jones (actor) =

American actor (1927–2014)

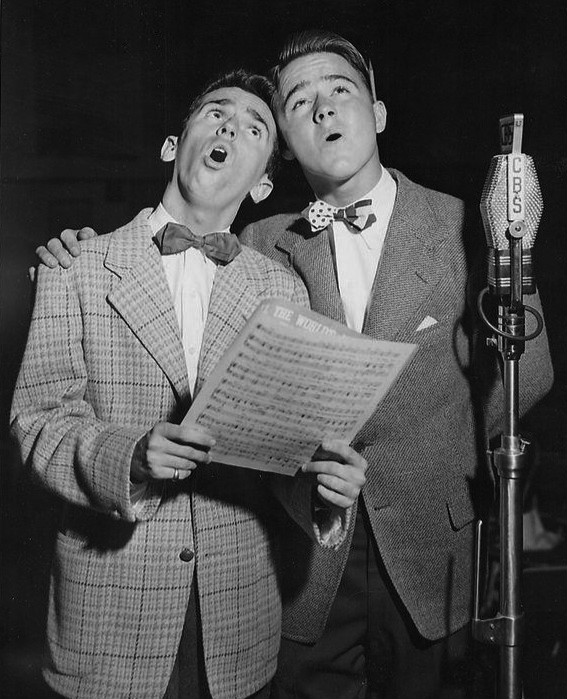
- Jones (right) as Henry Aldrich with Jackie Kelk on The Aldrich Family, circa 1943–44
- Born: Richard Percy Jones; February 25, 1927; Snyder, Texas, U.S.
- Died: July 7, 2014 (aged 87); Northridge, California, U.S.
- Occupations: Actor; singer
- Years active: 1934–1965
- Spouse: Betty Jones (m. 1948)
- Children: 4

Richard Percy Jones (February 25, 1927 – July 7, 2014), known as Dick Jones or Dickie Jones, was an American actor and singer who achieved success as a child performer and as a young adult, especially in B-Westerns. In 1938, he played Artimer "Artie" Peters, nephew of Buck Peters, in the Hopalong Cassidy film The Frontiersman. He is also known as the voice of Pinocchio in Walt Disney's film of the same name.

== Early life ==
Jones was born on February 25, 1927, in Snyder, some ninety miles south of Lubbock, Texas. The son of a newspaper editor, Jones was a prodigious horseman from infancy, having been billed at the age of four as the "World's Youngest Trick Rider and Trick Roper". At the age of six, he was hired to perform riding and lariat tricks in the rodeo owned by western star Hoot Gibson, who convinced young Jones and his parents that he should come to Hollywood. Jones and his mother moved there, and Gibson arranged for some small parts for the boy, whose good looks, energy, and pleasant voice quickly landed him more and bigger parts, both in low-budget westerns as well as in more substantial productions.

== Career ==
Among his early films are Little Men (1934) and A Man to Remember (1938). Jones appeared as a bit player in several of Hal Roach's Our Gang (The Little Rascals) shorts, including The Pigskin Palooka and Our Gang Follies of 1938 (both from 1937). In 1939, Jones appeared as a troublesome kid, Killer Parkins, in the film Nancy Drew... Reporter. The same year, he appeared with Jimmy Stewart in Mr. Smith Goes to Washington as Senate page Richard (Dick) Jones. In 1940, he had one of his most prominent roles, as the voice of Pinocchio in Disney's animated film of the same name. Jones attended Hollywood High School and at fifteen took over the role of Henry Aldrich on the hit radio show The Aldrich Family. He learned carpentry and augmented his income with jobs in that field. He served in the Army in the Alaska Territory during the final months of World War II.

Gene Autry, who before the war had cast Jones in several westerns, put him back to work through Autry's Flying A Pictures and, for television, his Flying A Productions. Jones guest-starred regularly on The Gene Autry Show in the early 1950s.

He appeared in a 1950 episode of the TV series The Lone Ranger titled "Man Without a Gun". In 1950, at the age of twenty-three, he played the 16-year-old cook for a small Confederate Army unit in the film Rocky Mountain.

By 1951, he was billed as Dick Jones, and starred as Dick West, sidekick to the Western hero known as The Range Rider, played by Jock Mahoney, in a Gene Autry television series that ran for seventy-six episodes in syndication, beginning in 1951.

Jones was cast thereafter in 1954 and 1955 in four episodes of Annie Oakley, another Flying A Production. Autry gave Jones his own series, Buffalo Bill, Jr. (1955), which ran for forty-two episodes in syndication.

Jones's last acting role was as Cliff Fletcher in the 1965 film Requiem for a Gunfighter.

== Honors ==
In 2000, Dick Jones was named one of the Disney Legends. In early 2009, Jones performed promotional events for the Platinum Edition DVD and Blu-ray release of Pinocchio. In March 2009, he was a guest star at the Williamsburg Film Festival.

== Personal life and death ==
Jones married his wife Betty in 1948. Together they had four children; Rick, Jeffrey, Jennifer and Melody. They remained married until Jones' death in 2014.

Jones died after a fall at his home on the evening of July 7, 2014, at the age of 87. At the time of his death, he was the last surviving cast member of Pinocchio.

== Filmography ==
- Wonder Bar (1934) as Boy (uncredited)
- Burn 'Em Up Barnes (1934) as Schoolboy [Chs. 1, 7] (uncredited)
- Babes in Toyland (1934) as Schoolboy (uncredited)
- Kid Millions (1934) as Little Boy in Ice Cream Number (uncredited)
- Strange Wives (1934) as Twin
- Little Men (1934) as Dolly
- Life Returns (1935) as Newsboy (uncredited)
- The Pecos Kid (1935) as Donald Pecos – as a Boy (uncredited)
- The Call of the Savage (1935, Serial) as Jan Trevor as a Boy [Ch. 1]
- The Hawk (1935) as Dickie Thomas
- Queen of the Jungle (1935) as David Worth Jr. as a child
- Silk Hat Kid (1935) as Jimmy (uncredited)
- Westward Ho (1935) as Jim Wyatt – as a Child
- O'Shaughnessy's Boy (1935) as Boy with Sling Shot at Parade (uncredited)
- Moonlight on the Prairie (1935) as Dickie Roberts
- Queen of the Jungle (1935) as David Worth as a child
- The Adventures of Frank Merriwell (1936) as Jimmy McLaw (uncredited)
- Exclusive Story (1936) as Higgins' Son (uncredited)
- Sutter's Gold (1936) as 2nd Newsboy (uncredited)
- Little Lord Fauntleroy (1936) as Ceddie at Age 7 (uncredited)
- The First Baby (1936) as Ellis Child (uncredited)
- 36 Hours to Kill (1936) as Little Boy Selling The Garden Beautiful (uncredited)
- Pepper (1936) as Member of Pepper's Gang (uncredited)
- Love Begins at 20 (1936) as Boy on Streetcar (uncredited)
- Daniel Boone (1936) as Master Jerry Randolph
- The Man I Marry (1936) as Little Boy (uncredited)
- Wild Horse Round-Up (1936) as Dickie Williams
- Black Legion (1937) as Buddy Taylor
- Blake of Scotland Yard (1937) as Bobby Mason
- Ready, Willing, and Able (1937) as Junior (uncredited)
- Land Beyond the Law (1937) as Bobby Skinner (uncredited)
- Smoke Tree Range (1937) as Teddy Page
- Flying Fists (1937) as Dickie Martin
- Stella Dallas (1937) as Lee Morrison
- Renfrew of the Royal Mounted (1937) as Tommy MacDonald
- Love Is on the Air (1937) as Bill – Mouse's Friend
- Hollywood Round-Up (1937) as Dickie Stevens
- The Kid Comes Back (1938) as Bobby Doyle
- Border Wolves (1938) as Jimmie Benton
- Land of Fighting Men (1938) as Jimmy Mitchell
- Love, Honor and Behave (1938) as Boy Playing with Young Ted (uncredited)
- The Devil's Party (1938) as Joe O'Mara as a Child (uncredited)
- The Great Adventures of Wild Bill Hickok (1938) as Buddy
- A Man to Remember (1938) as Dick Abbott – Age 8–12
- Girls on Probation (1938) as Magazine Newsboy – Witness (uncredited)
- The Frontiersmen (1938) as Artie Peters
- Woman Doctor (1939) as Johnny
- Nancy Drew... Reporter (1939) as Killer Parkins
- Sergeant Madden (1939) as Dennis Madden, as a boy
- The Man Who Dared (1939) as Bill Carter
- Young Mr. Lincoln (1939) as Adam Clay as a Boy (uncredited)
- On Borrowed Time (1939) as Boy in Tree (uncredited)
- Sky Patrol (1939) as Bobby Landis
- Mr. Smith Goes to Washington (1939) as Richard "Dickie" Jones, Senate Page Boy (uncredited)
- Beware Spooks! (1939) as First Boy (uncredited)
- Destry Rides Again (1939) as Claggett Boy
- Pinocchio (1940) as Pinocchio / Alexander (voice, uncredited)
- Virginia City (1940) as Cobby Gill
- Hi-Yo Silver (1940) as The Boy (uncredited)
- Maryland (1940) as Lee Danfield – Age 12 (uncredited)
- Brigham Young (1940) as Henry Kent
- The Howards of Virginia (1940) as Matt Howard at 12
- Knute Rockne All American (1940) as Boy Captain (uncredited)
- Adventure in Washington (1941) as Abbott
- The Vanishing Virginian (1942) as Robert Yancey Jr.
- Mountain Rhythm (1943) as Darwood Gates Alton
- The Outlaw (1943) as Boy (uncredited)
- The Adventures of Mark Twain (1944) as Samuel Clemens – age 15 (uncredited)
- The Strawberry Roan (1948) as Joe Bailey
- Angel on the Amazon (1948) as George (uncredited)
- Battleground (1949) as Tanker (uncredited)
- Sands of Iwo Jima (1949) as Scared Marine (uncredited)
- Sons of New Mexico (1949) as Randy Pryor
- Military Academy with That Tenth Avenue Gang (1950) as Richard Reilly (uncredited)
- The Lone Ranger (1949–1950, TV Series) as Jim Douglas / Jim
- Redwood Forest Trail (1950) as Mighty Mite
- Rocky Mountain (1950) as Jim (Buck) Wheat (CSA)
- Fort Worth (1951) as Luther Wicks
- The Range Rider (1951–1953) as Dick West
- The Old West (1952) as Pinto
- Wagon Team (1952) as Dave Weldon, aka The Apache Kid
- Last of the Pony Riders (1953) as Johnny Blair
- Attila (1954)
- The Bamboo Prison (1954) as P.O.W. Jackie
- The Bridges at Toko-Ri (1954) as Pilot (uncredited)
- The Wild Dakotas (1956) as Mike McGeehee
- The Cool and the Crazy (1958) as Stu Summerville
- Shadow of the Boomerang (1960) as Bob Prince
- The Devil's Bedroom (1964) as Norm
- Requiem for a Gunfighter (1965) as Cliff Fletcher (final film role)
