= Jackie Kelk =

American actor

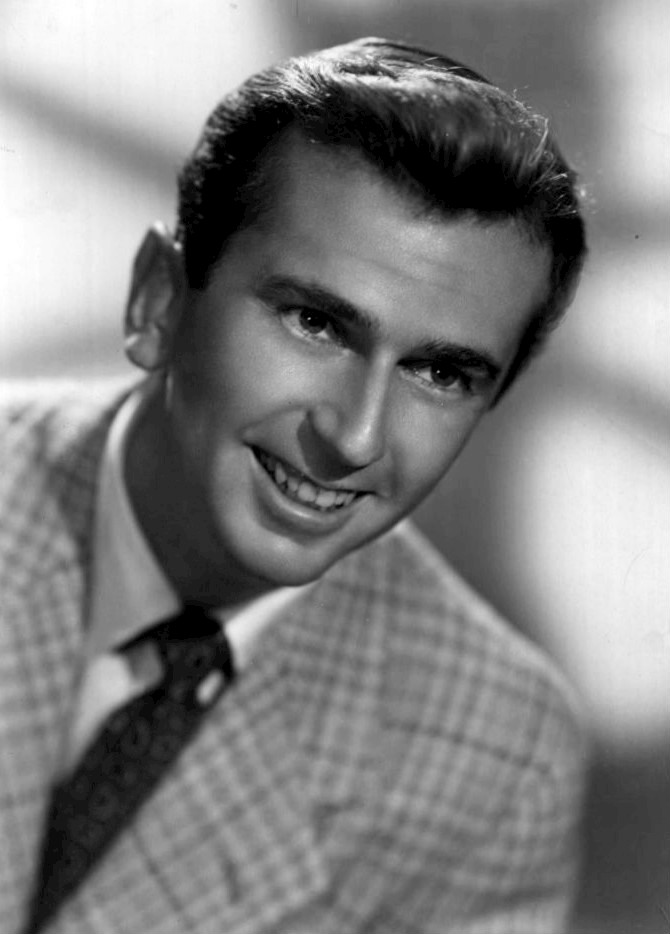
- Kelk in 1947
- Born: John Daly Kelk; August 6, 1923; Brooklyn, New York, U.S.
- Died: September 5, 2002 (aged 79); Rancho Mirage, California, U.S.
- Resting place: Lakeview Cemetery
- Other name: Jack Kelk
- Occupations: Actor, comedian
- Years active: 1931–1960

John Daly "Jackie" Kelk (August 6, 1923 – September 5, 2002) was an American stage, radio, film, and television actor and stand-up comedian. He is best known for portraying the role of Homer Brown on the radio series The Aldrich Family and as the original voice of Jimmy Olsen on The Adventures of Superman.

== Early years ==
Kelk was born John Daly Kelk in Brooklyn, New York, the son of Mr. and Mrs. Willy Kelk. He attended St. Gregory's Academy before changing to Professional Children's School in New York.

== Career ==
Kelk began his career as a child actor in the 1930s. He made his film debut Sam in the 1931 short Play Ball, made by Warner Bros. In 1932, he was cast as a snobby bow-tied boy named "Georgie Bassett" in the Penrod Vitaphone comedy shorts. The shorts were similar to the popular and long running Our Gang shorts, and were based on books by Booth Tarkington.

At age 10, Kelk appeared in the 1934 drama Born to Be Bad. He also had roles in Broadway productions included Young Jim Bailey in No More Frontier (1931), Peter Burroughs in Bridal Wise (1932), Henri, the Son in The Perfect Marriage (1932), Mr. Clayton in Goodbye Again (1932–1933), Prince Rudolph in Jubilee (1935–1936), "Chub" Tolliver in The County Chairman (1936), Terry in Terry and the Pirates (1937), Percy in Flare Path (1942–1943), Elliot Smollens in Tenting Tonight (1947), and Herbie in Me and Juliet (1953–1954).

Kelk's debut in network radio came on The Cohens, which starred Fanny Brice. He also portrayed Chester in The Gumps. In the early 1940s, Kelk played Pete on the radio soap opera Mother of Mine, and in January 1946 he joined the cast of Celebrity Club on CBS. He played Jimmy Olsen from 1940 to 1947 on the radio show The Adventures of Superman and Homer Brown, best friend of Henry Aldrich on the teenage radio comedy The Aldrich Family. He had the role of Oliver in the soap opera Valiant Lady. From 1949 to 1950, Kelk reprised his role as Homer Brown in the television adaptation of The Aldrich Family.

During the 1950s, Kelk continued with roles in both film and television. In 1951, he starred in title role on the NBC live sitcom Young Mr. Bobbin. The series debuted on August 26, 1951, and was canceled after one season. Kelk later had guest starring roles on Those Whiting Girls, The Lineup, Date with the Angels and Leave It to Beaver. He also appeared in bit parts in Somebody Up There Likes Me (1956) and The Pajama Game (1957). From 1958 to 1959, Kelk had a recurring role as obstetrician Dr. Bo Boland during the first season of the ABC sitcom The Donna Reed Show. It was Kelk's final acting role.

== Death ==
On September 5, 2002, Kelk died of a lung infection at Eisenhower Medical Center in Rancho Mirage, California at the age of 79. He is buried in Lakeview Cemetery in New Canaan, Connecticut.
