= The Aldrich Family =

American radio situation comedy (1939–1953)

The Aldrich Family, a popular radio teenage situation comedy (July 2, 1939 – April 19, 1953), was also presented in films, television and comic books. In the radio series' opening exchange, awkward teen Henry's mother called, "Hen-ry-y-y-y! Hen-ry Al-drich!", and he responded with a breaking adolescent voice, "Com-ing, Mother!"

The creation of playwright Clifford Goldsmith, Henry Aldrich began on Broadway as a minor character in Goldsmith's play What a Life. Produced and directed by George Abbott, What a Life ran for 538 performances (April 13, 1938 to July 8, 1939). The Broadway cast included Eddie Bracken, Betty Field and Butterfly McQueen. The actor who brought Henry to life on stage was 20-year-old Ezra Stone, who was billed near the bottom as the 20th actor in the cast. Stone was also employed as the play's production assistant.

Time magazine found the play "short on plot" but noted:

Chief amusement centres in Henry Aldrich (Ezra Stone), a cross between Penrod and Willie Baxter, who attends classes mainly in the principal's office. With a talent for head-on collisions, always ingenious, never crafty, always there with an answer, never with the right one, brash, bouncing, rumpled, rattled, rueful by turns, Henry grows into that rare thing on the stage—a person ...

== Radio ==
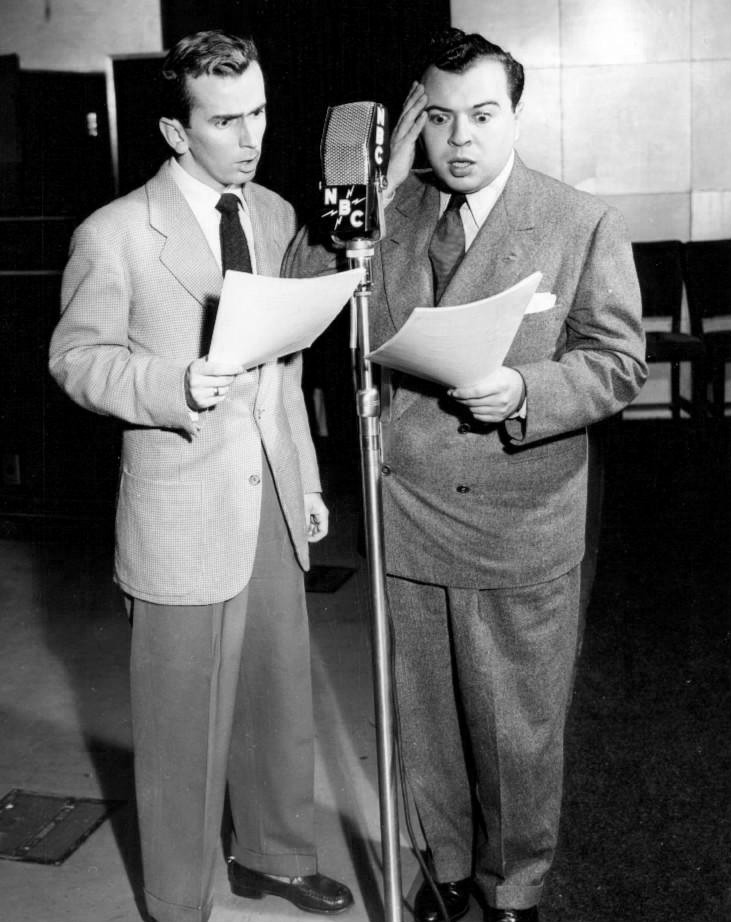
Jackie Kelk (left) as Homer Brown and Ezra Stone as Henry Aldrich on the air, 1947.

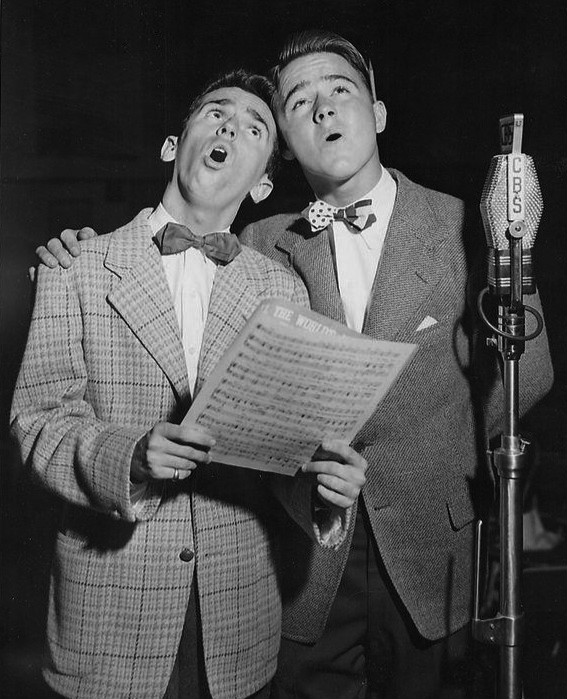
Kelk with Dick Jones, who played Henry from 1943 to 1944.

When Rudy Vallee saw the play, he asked Goldsmith to adapt it into some sketches for his radio program, and this was followed in 1938 by a 39-week run of a sketch comedy series on The Kate Smith Hour with Stone continuing in the role of Henry. Smith's director, Bob Welsh, is credited with the creation of the "Henry Aldrich!" opening, which eventually became one of the most famous signature sounds in radio.

After finding an audience with Smith's listeners, The Aldrich Family was launched in its own series as a summer replacement program for Jack Benny in NBC's Sunday night lineup, July 2, 1939, and it stayed there until October 1, 1939, when it moved to Tuesday nights at 8 p.m., sponsored by General Foods's popular gelatin dessert Jell-O, which also sponsored Jack Benny at the time. The Aldriches ran in that slot from October 10, 1939 until May 28, 1940, moving to Thursdays, from July 4, 1940 until July 20, 1944. After a brief hiatus, the show moved to CBS, running on Fridays from September 1, 1944 until August 30, 1946 with sponsors Grape Nuts and Jell-O before moving back to NBC from September 5, 1946 to June 28, 1951 on Thursdays and, then, as a Sustaining program in its final run of September 21, 1952 to April 19, 1953 on Sundays.

Beginning on July 5, 1946, the program ran for 10 weeks on Friday nights as a summer replacement for Kate Smith Sings. The sponsor, General Foods, used the time to "promote its salt product ... instead of Grape Nuts".

The show was a top-ten ratings hit within two years of its birth (in 1941, the show carried a 33.4 Crossley rating, landing it solidly alongside Jack Benny and Bob Hope). Earning $3000 a week (equal to $65,667 today), Goldsmith was the highest paid writer in radio, and his show became a prototype for the teen-oriented situation comedies that followed on radio and television.

Stone kept the lead role until 1942, when he entered the Army for World War II. Norman Tokar succeeded Stone as Henry for two seasons. Best known for his later work directing the television hit Leave It to Beaver – whose approach of telling its stories from the vantage point of a child may have been inspired by the similar implication in many Aldrich episodes – Tokar also helped write many of the Aldrich episodes. On The Aldrich Family, Tokar was followed by Dickie Jones (1943–44) and Raymond Ives (1944–45), before Stone returned to his signature role. Bobby Ellis became the last Henry Aldrich in 1952.

This series is now in the public domain and is available for download on the Internet Archive.

== Family and friends ==
Henry's parents, Sam and Alice, were portrayed by House Jameson and Katharine Raht, his sister Mary was played by Charita Bauer among others, and his usual girlfriend, Kathleen Anderson, was voiced by Mary Shipp. The role of Henry's best friend, Homer Brown, was played by Jackie Kelk (as well as Jack Grimes, Michael O'Day and John Fiedler). Homer's parents were Arthur Vinton and Agnes Moorehead, among others. Eddie Bracken appeared in the earlier shows as friend Dizzy Stevens. The show's announcers included Harry Von Zell, Dan Seymour and Dwight Weist.

The Aldrich Family lived at 117 Elm Street in Centerville, USA (state unknown, though loosely based on Goldsmith's own hometown of Centerville, New York). Henry and his friend Homer attend Central High School with an assortment of other friends. Henry's father Sam is a lawyer and his mother Alice is a homemaker. His older sister Mary is mentioned to be away at college in some episodes, and lives at home with the family in others. Also living in Centerville is Mrs. Aldrich's sister, Henry and Mary's Aunt Harriet. Henry has had a variety of pets, including a dog named Tauser, and pigeons and rabbits which he was raising in his attic, but no pet is mentioned regularly throughout the series. Homer's dog Smoothie is mentioned in one episode.

Henry Aldrich was an endearingly bumbling kid growing awkwardly into adolescence, and The Aldrich Family often revolved around Henry's misadventures with his friends and girls.

== Recognition ==
In 1942, the Sam Aldrich character was named "radio's outstanding father" by the National Father's Day Committee.

== Partial list of episodes ==
- "Crowded Bathroom" (Rudy Vallee short) (07/27/1938)
- "More of the Life of Henry Aldrich" (Rudy Vallee short) (07/11/1938)
- "Henry's Engagement" (10/10/1939)
- "Girl Trouble" (aka "Blind Date") (10/17/1939)
- "Ice Fishing for Fruitcake" (1940)
- "School Picnic" (1940)
- "Raising Pigeons & Rabbits – Part I" (02/20/1940)
- "Raising Pigeons & Rabbits– Part II" (02/27/1940)
- "Coupon Craze" (04/23/1940)
- "Model Airplane Race" (04/30/1940)
- "The Lost Watch" (09/12/1940)
- "Halloween Pranks" (10/31/1940)
- "Mother's Day Dinner" (05/07/1940)
- "Cross Country Race" (06/11/1940)
- "Pen Pal" (01/26/1941)
- "The Lost Letter" (10/23/1941)
- "Mrs. Aldrich Has an Attitude" (01/22/1942)
- "Henry's Secret Admirer" (01/29/1942)
- "Selling Christmas Cards" (06/18/1942)
- "Valentine's Day Party" (02/11/1943)
- "Love Note to Teacher" (02/23/1943)
- "Legal Trouble" (03/11/1943)
- "Selling War Bonds" (04/01/1943)
- "Props for the School Play" (04/15/1943)
- "Waste Paper Drive" (1944)
- "The Generous Gentleman" (aka "Movie Star") (01/27/1944)
- "Homer's Piano Recital" (03/02/1944)
- "Warmest Day in March" (03/09/1944)
- "April Fools Day" (04/01/1944)
- "Close That Door" (04/13/1944)
- "Awaiting Phone Calls" (04/20/1944)
- "Replacing Box of Chocolates" (04/27/1944)
- "Babysitting or Movies?" (05/11/1944)
- "Bracelet for Kathleen" (06/29/1944)
- "Homer is Popular" (09/15/1944)
- "McCall's Bicycle" (11/02/1944; script re-performed on 04/26/1953)
- "Henry Sends Candy to Two Girls" (01/12/1945)
- "Church and Chocolate" (1/25/1945)
- "Costume Party" (11/16/1945)
- "Dinner Jacket Mix-up" (03/08/1946)
- "Mary Has Joe Graham Over" (09/26/1946)
- "Cancer Special" (11/30/1946)
- "Birthday Pipe for Mr. Aldrich" (03/13/1947)
- "Dinner Date with Gladys" (02/21/1948)
- "Date with Helen Forbes" (05/13/1948)
- "Painting the Garage" (06/24/1948)
- "Homer's Party" (09/16/1948)
- "Rotating Weekly Parties" (09/30/1948)
- "Everybody Sleeps Over" (10/?/1948)
- "Mary's New Job" (aka "Is Mary Getting Married?") (10/07/1948)
- "Babysitting for Stevie" (10/21/1948)
- "The Great Wiener Roast" (10/24/1948)

== Films ==
Eleven Henry Aldrich B movies were made by Paramount Pictures between 1939 and 1944:

Henry Aldrich – Boy Scout (1944)

- What a Life (1939)
- Life with Henry (1941)
- Henry Aldrich for President (1941)
- Henry Aldrich, Editor (1942)
- Henry and Dizzy (1942)
- Henry Aldrich Swings It (1943)
- Henry Aldrich Gets Glamour (1943)
- Henry Aldrich Haunts a House (1943)
- Henry Aldrich, Boy Scout (1944)
- Henry Aldrich Plays Cupid (1944)
- Henry Aldrich's Little Secret (1944)

The first two films – the Brackett and Wilder scripted What a Life (1939), followed by Life with Henry (1941) – featured Jackie Cooper in the title role. In the remaining nine films, Jimmy Lydon portrayed Henry Aldrich. Olive Blakeney and John Litel played Mr. and Mrs. Aldrich, while Charles Smith and Joan Mortimer played Basil "Dizzy" Stevens and Elise Towers.

== Television ==
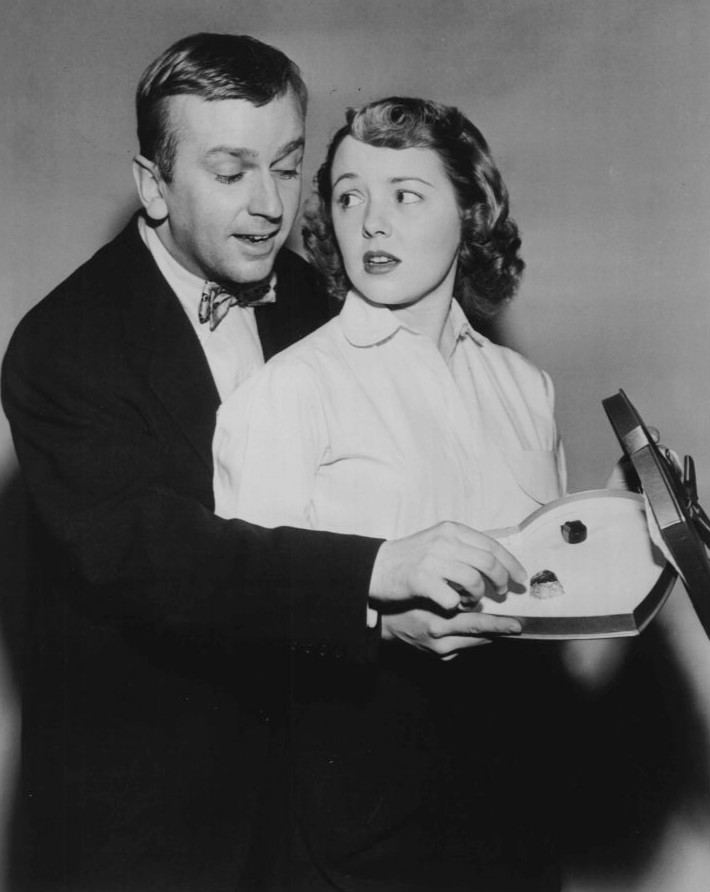
Jackie Kelk, who played Homer Brown on the radio show, and Mary Malone as Mary Aldrich in the television program, 1951.

On October 2, 1949, the program premiered on NBC while continuing to air on the radio with a primarily different cast. Over the course of its nearly four-year run on television, Henry was portrayed by five different actors: Robert Casey, Richard Tyler, Henry Girard, Kenneth Nelson, and Bobby Ellis, the only one to participate in the radio production as well. Other characters – including Mrs. Aldrich, Henry's sister Mary, and his best friend Homer Brown – were portrayed by multiple actors as well, a practice not uncommon in radio but unusual for television, where cast changes are more noticeable.

The program garnered some adverse publicity when film and radio veteran Jean Muir was signed to play Mrs. Aldrich in the second season, which was to begin on August 27, 1950. Shortly before Muir's scheduled premiere, right-wing groups accused the actress of being a Communist sympathizer (her name appeared in Red Channels, a pamphlet listing the names of performers allegedly involved in left-wing activities), and General Foods, the show's sponsor, cancelled the first episode of the new season, replacing her with Nancy Carroll a week later, when the series returned on September 3. Muir went on to defend herself before a Congressional committee, but her career never recovered from the charges. After General Foods ended their sponsorship in the spring of 1951, Campbell Soup Company became the new sponsor when the series moved from Sundays to Friday nights that fall. The final episode was broadcast on May 29, 1953, slightly more than a month after the radio series came to an end.

The cast of the television series included Marcia Henderson as Kathleen Anderson.

The series finished at #15 in the Nielsen ratings for the 1950–1951 season.

The comedy troupe Firesign Theatre parodied the show with the sketch in "Don't Crush That Dwarf Hand Me the Pliers".

== Comics ==
A Henry Aldrich comic book published by Dell Comics lasted 22 issues from 1950 to 1954.

== Listen to ==
- Radio Lovers: The Aldrich Family
- "Aldrich Family on Way Back When"
- 97 episodes of "The Aldrich Family" from the Internet Archive.
- Zoot Radio, Free The Aldrich Family radio show downloads
- The Aldrich Family on Old Time Radio Outlaws
