= Clifford Goldsmith =

American dramatist

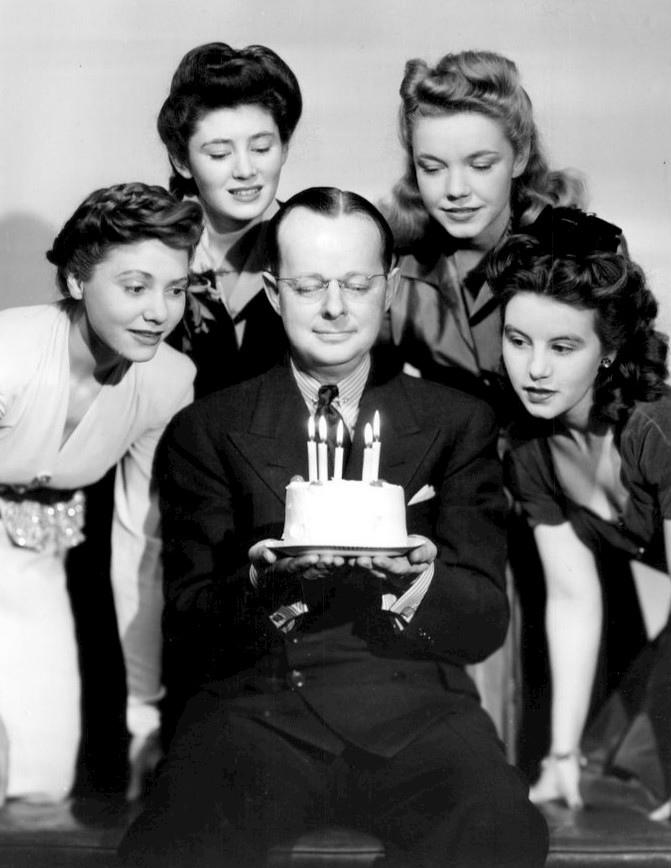
- In 1943, author Clifford Goldsmith and actresses Mary Rolfe, Ann Lincoln, Mary Shipp, and Charita Bauer posed with a cake in celebration of the fifth anniversary of The Aldrich Family radio program. Goldsmith wrote the show's scripts.
- Born: March 29, 1899; East Aurora, New York
- Died: July 11, 1971, age 72; Tucson, Arizona
- Education: University of Pennsylvania; American Academy of Dramatic Arts
- Occupation: Writer
- Spouse(s): Margaret Towell (1921 – ?); Kathryn Allen (1933 – 1971, his death)
- Children: 1 daughter 4 sons
- Parent(s): Charles Goldsmith and Edith Henshaw Goldsmith

Clifford Goldsmith (March 29, 1899 – July 11, 1971) was an American writer, best known for his play What a Life, from which The Aldrich Family radio and television series and the Henry Aldrich film series were derived. In 1943, Time magazine reported that Goldsmith earned "radio's fattest writing fee ($3,000 for one show a week)."

== Early years ==
Goldsmith was born in East Aurora, New York, the son of Charles Goldsmith and Edith Henshaw Goldsmith. His father was the local high school's principal. Goldsmith's mother died in 1907; he and his half-sister were orphaned when their father died in 1909. They spent much time thereafter with an aunt in Centerville, New York, where he spent most of his childhood.

He attended Moses Brown School in Providence, Rhode Island, and the University of Pennsylvania. After one year at the latter, he went to the American Academy of Dramatic Arts. For eight years, Goldsmith taught high school students about health topics during the day and wrote plays during the evening.

== Career ==
In the early 1920s, Goldsmith tried acting, with bit parts in stage productions, including Chautauquas, in New York. In 1922, he began working with publicity for the National Dairy Council, a job that he kept until 1938.

=== Henry Aldrich ===
In 1943, Time called Henry Aldrich "U.S. radio's favorite juvenile") Decades later, Encyclopedia.com described him as "The quintessential teenager of the 1940s."

Aldrich first was seen in 1938 as the main character of Goldsmith's Broadway play What A Life. The play opened at the Biltmore Theatre on April 13, 1938. It ran for 538 performances and was adapted into a film (also called What a Life) that was released in 1939.

A radio adaptation, The Aldrich Family, was broadcast from 1939 to 1953. Goldsmith was the show's sole writer for approximately seven years; thereafter, he supervised the work of other writers. A television adaptation, also titled The Aldrich Family, was broadcast from 1949 to 1953. Goldsmith was that program's sole writer for its first year, and after that he collaborated with other writers.

Goldsmith based his writings on what he observed in the lives of Peter and Thayer White, his wife's sons from a previous marriage.

=== Other television ===
Programs for which Goldsmith "consulted or collaborated in the writing" included The Flying Nun, Leave it to Beaver, The Donna Reed Show, Petticoat Junction, and Dennis the Menace.

== Personal life ==
On July 2, 1921, Goldsmith married Margaret Towell in New York City. In 1933, he married Kathryn Allen. They had been married 38 years at the time of his death.
