= John Eldredge (actor) =

American actor (1904–1961)

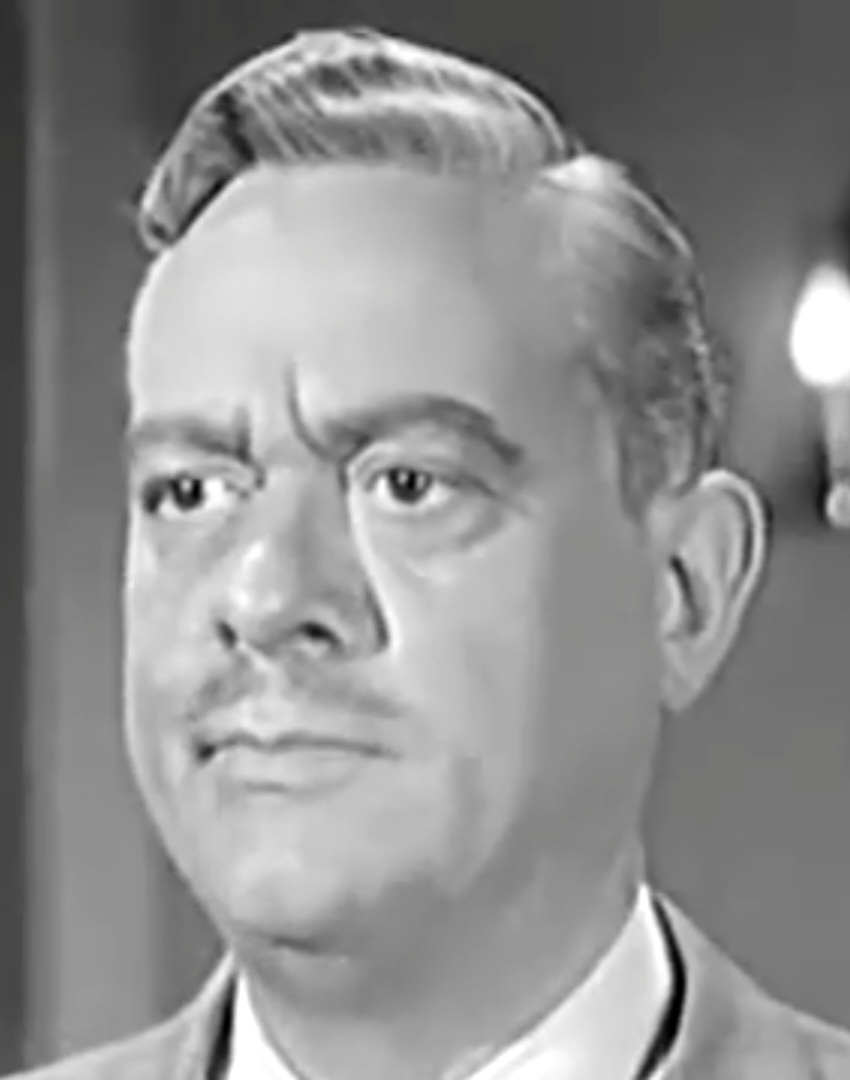
- Eldredge in Meet Corliss Archer, 1954
- Born: John Dornin Eldredge; August 30, 1904; San Francisco, California, U.S.
- Died: September 23, 1961 (aged 57); Laguna Beach, California, U.S.
- Resting place: Pacific View Memorial Park, Corona del Mar, California
- Occupation: Actor
- Years active: 1934–1960
- Relatives: George Eldredge (brother)

John Dornin Eldredge (August 30, 1904 – September 23, 1961) was an American film and television actor. He was the younger brother of character actor George Eldredge (1898–1977).

== Early life ==
Eldredge was born August 30, 1904, in San Francisco. He was the son of a clergyman who made a speciality of dramatics at university. When he confessed to his father that he wanted to be an actor, his father grinned and said: "That's all right son so long as you are a good one." His eldest brother, George Eldredge, also became an actor.

== Career ==
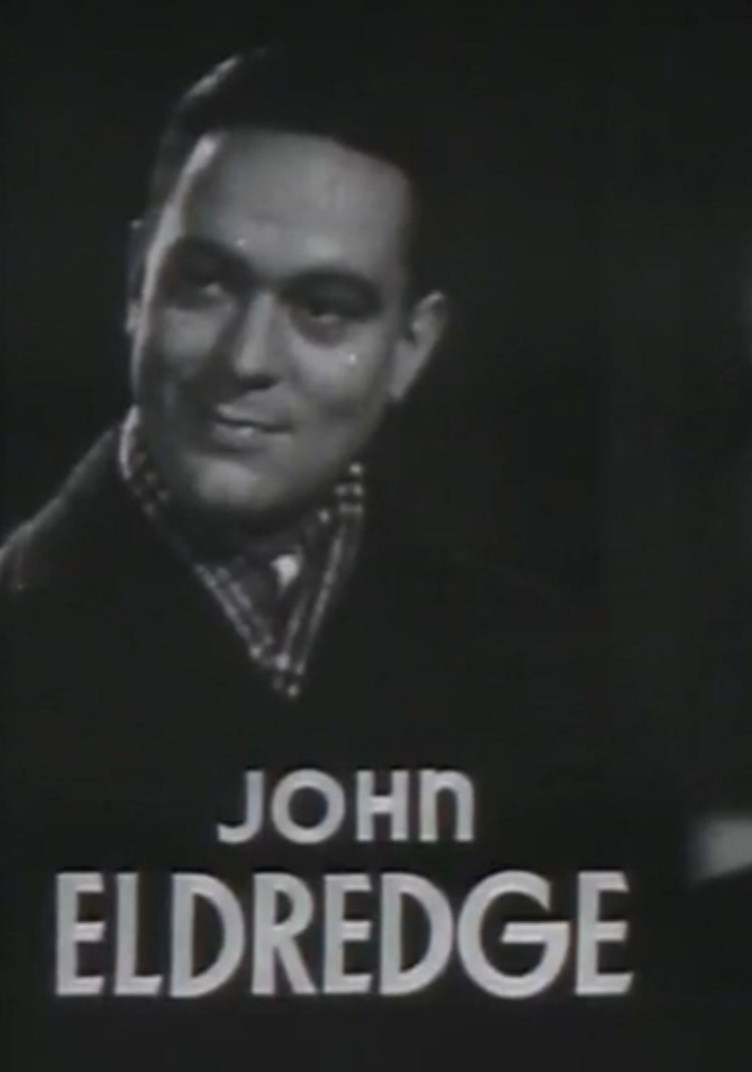
Eldredge in Dangerous (1935)

He began his theatrical career in repertory and then in comic opera and later played small parts in New York City till he made a hit on Broadway and it was a role opposite Lillian Gish that won him a Warners film contract.

Eldredge's Broadway credits include Three-Cornered Moon (1932), The Good Fairy (1932), Katerina (1928), The Cherry Orchard (1928), and The Would-be Gentleman (1928).

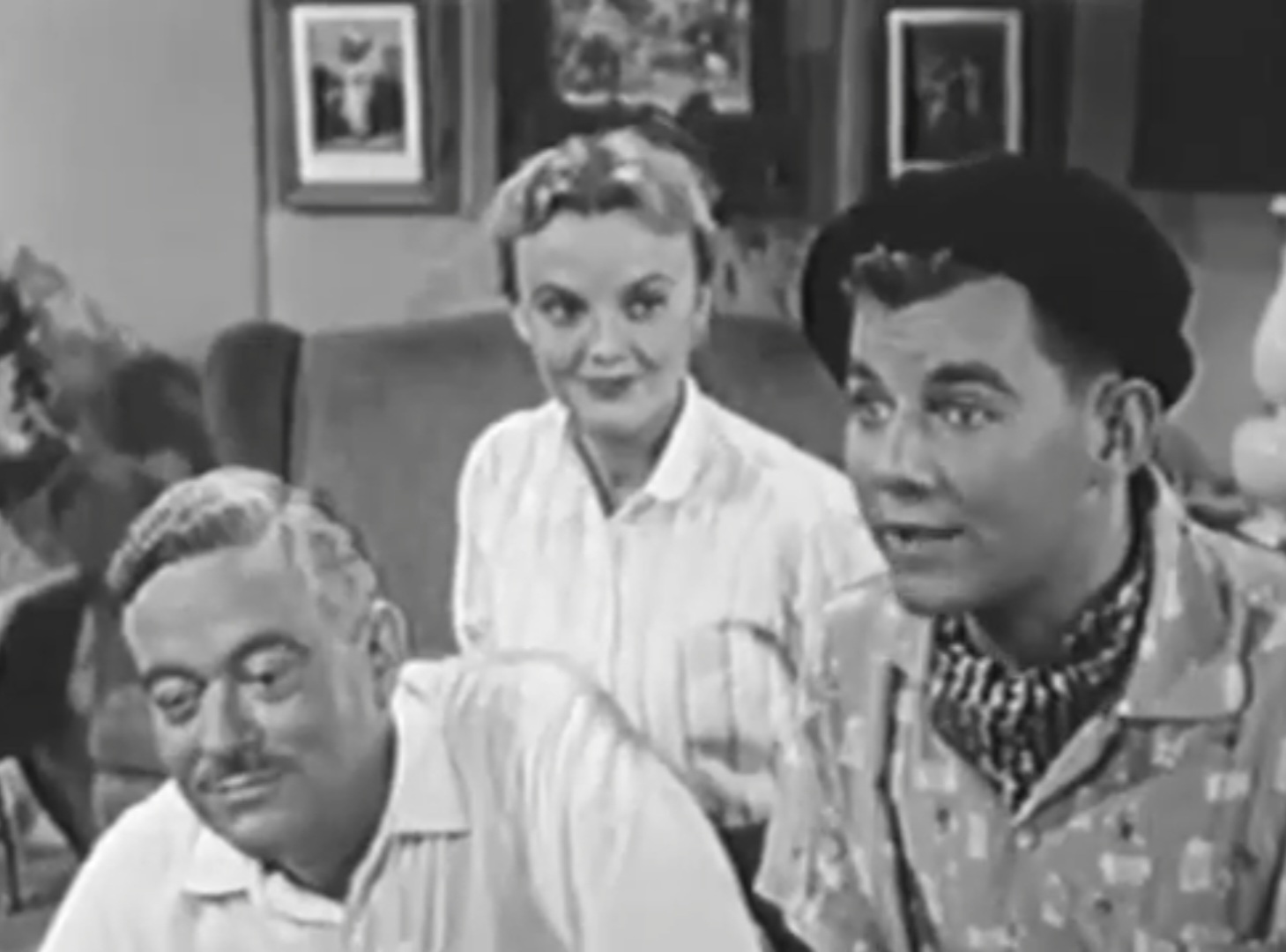
Eldredge with Ann Baker and Robert Ellis in Meet Corliss Archer, 1955

On 05/28/1959, he played Mr. Preston in an episode of Leave It to Beaver.

In 1954–1955, Eldredge played Harry Archer, father of the title character, in the CBS Television situation comedy Meet Corliss Archer.

== Death ==
He died September 23, 1961, at his home in Treasure Island Trailer Park in Laguna Beach, California, where he was recovering from a heart attack. His remains are interred at Pacific View Memorial Park in Corona del Mar, California.

== Filmography ==
=== Film ===
Year	Title	Role	Notes
1934	The Man With Two Faces	Horace Barry Jones	
1934	Flirtation Walk	Lieut. Biddle	
1935	The White Cockatoo	Francis Talley	
1935	The Woman in Red	Eugene 'Gene' Fairchild	
1935	The Girl from 10th Avenue	Hugh Brown	
1935	Oil for the Lamps of China	Don	
1935	The Goose and the Gander	Lawrence	
1935	Dr. Socrates	Dr. Burton	
1935	Man of Iron	Ed Tanahill	
1935	Dangerous	Gordon Heath	
1936	The Murder of Dr. Harrigan	Dr. Harrigan	
1936	Snowed Under	McBride	
1936	Murder by an Aristocrat	John Tweed	
1936	His Brother's Wife	Tom Claybourne	
1936	Follow Your Heart	Harrison Beecher	
1936	Adventure in Manhattan	Tommy – Actor in Play	(uncredited)
1936	Mysterious Crossing	Paul Briand	
1937	The Holy Terror	Lt. Comdr. R.E. Wallace	
1937	Fair Warning	Dr. Galt	
1937	Charlie Chan at the Olympics	Cartwright	
1937	The Go Getter	Lloyd Skinner	
1937	Mr. Dodd Takes the Air	Jim Lidin	
1937	One Mile from Heaven	Jerry Harrison	
1937	Sh! The Octopus	Paul Morgan	
1938	Women Are Like That	Charles Braden	
1939	King of the Underworld	Niles Nelson	
1939	Persons in Hiding	Chief Agent Gordon Kingsley	
1939	Blind Alley	Dick Holbrook	
1939	Undercover Doctor	Gordon Kingsley	
1939	Television Spy	Boris	
1939	Private Detective	Millard Lannon	
1940	The Marines Fly High	John Henderson / El Vengador	
1940	Dr. Kildare's Strange Case	Henry Adams, Amnesia Patient	
1940	Son of Roaring Dan	Thorndyke	
1940	The Devil's Pipeline	George Butler	
1940	Always a Bride	Marshall Winkler	
1941	High Sierra	Lon Preiser	
1941	Flight from Destiny	Peterson	
1941	Horror Island	Cousin George	
1941	The Black Cat	Stanley Borden	
1941	Blossoms in the Dust	Damon	
1941	Life Begins for Andy Hardy	Paul McWilliams	
1941	It Started with Eve	Hotel Desk Manager	(uncredited)
1941	Mr. District Attorney in the Carter Case	Andrew Belmont	
1942	The Mad Doctor of Market Street	Dwight, Ship's Officer	
1942	Saboteur	Footman	(uncredited)
1942	Tough as They Come	Rogers	
1942	Madame Spy	Carl Gordon	
1944	Beautiful But Broke	Waldo Main	
1944	Bermuda Mystery	Lyman Brooks	
1944	Song of Nevada	Rollo Bingham	
1944	Dangerous Passage	Vaughn	
1944	Swing Out the Blues	Gregg Talbot	
1945	Eve Knew Her Apples	Walter W. Walter, II	
1945	Circumstantial Evidence	Judge White	
1945	The Master Key	Walter Stark, Council Member M-6	Serial [Chs.1–5]
1945	Bad Men of the Border	Bart Breslow	
1945	Dangerous Partners	Farrel	
1946	Live Wires	Herbert L. Sayers	
1946	Up Goes Maisie	Benson	
1946	I Ring Doorbells	Ransome	
1946	Swing Parade of 1946	Bascomb	
1946	Lost City of the Jungle	Dr. Elmore	Serial
1946	Passkey to Danger	Alexander Cardovsky	
1946	The French Key	John Holterman	
1946	Dark Alibi	Anthony R. Morgan	
1946	Little Miss Big	Sanford Baxter	
1946	Temptation	Don Gibbs	
1947	Backlash	John Morland	
1947	Seven Were Saved	Rollin Hartley	
1947	Second Chance	Conrad Martyn	
1947	The Fabulous Joe	Charlie	
1947	The Hal Roach Comedy Carnival	Charlie in The Fabulous Joe	Archive footage
1948	Angels' Alley	Asst. Dist. Atty. John Willis	
1948	Smart Woman	Lester Flynn, Reporter	
1948	Jinx Money	Lullaby Kane	
1948	Sealed Verdict	Col. Macklin	
1948	Whispering Smith	George McCloud	
1949	Sky Dragon	William E. French	
1949	Stampede	Cox	
1949	The Sickle or the Cross	Rev. Dodge	
1949	Top o' the Morning	E. L. Larkin	
1949	Square Dance Jubilee	Jed Stratton	
1950	Unmasked	Johnny Rocco	
1950	Champagne for Caesar	Executive No. 1	
1950	Lonely Heart Bandits	Tony Morell / Wade Antrim	
1950	Rustlers on Horseback	George Parradine	
1951	The Groom Wore Spurs	J.N. Bergen	
1951	Insurance Investigator	John Hammond	
1951	Night Into Morning	Professor	(uncredited)
1951	No Questions Asked	Mr. Perkin	
1951	The Law and the Lady	Asst. Manager – Monte Carlo Hotel	(uncredited)
1951	An American in Paris	Jack Jansen	
1951	Angels in the Outfield	Dr. Eustace Danforth	
1951	All That I Have	Justice Webster	
1951	Street Bandits	L.T. Mitchell	
1952	For Men Only	Mr. St. Claire – Regents Board Member	
1952	Just This Once	Commander Denham	
1952	Scaramouche	Assembly Clerk	(uncredited)
1952	The Sniper	Mr. Stonecroft	
1952	Fearless Fagan	Producer	
1952	No Holds Barred	Doctor Howard	
1953	The Mississippi Gambler	Galbreath	
1953	Girls in the Night	Judge	
1953	Invaders from Mars	Mr. Turner	
1953	Ma and Pa Kettle on Vacation	Masterson	
1954	Racing Blood	'Mitch' Mitchell	
1954	Loophole	Frank Temple	
1954	The Desperado	Mr. Cameron	
1955	Soldier of Fortune	Man Slapped in Lobby	(uncredited)
1955	'Toughest Man Alive	Ingo Widner	
1956	Meet Me in Las Vegas	Sands Co-Owner	
1956	The Toy Tiger	Executive	
1956	Somebody Up There Likes Me	Reformatory Warden George Niles	
1956	Francis in the Haunted House	Criminologist	
1956	The First Traveling Saleslady	Greavy – Prosecuting Attorney	
1957	God Is My Partner	Jess Northrop	
1957	Raintree County	Cousin Sam	
1958	I Married a Monster from Outer Space	Police Capt. H.B. Collins	
1960	Freckles	Mr. Cooper	
1960	Five Guns to Tombstone	Endicott	final film role

=== Television ===
Year	Title	Role	Notes
1950 - 1956	The Lone Ranger	Jack Burke / Rocky Carson / Applegate aka Denton	4 episodes
1955 - 1956	Science Fiction Theater		2 episodes
1953 - 1958	Adventures of Superman	Mr. X / Jonas Rockwell / Burt Burnside / Walter Canby	4 episodes
1953 - 1959	Death Valley Days	Ray Trumbull / Governor McDougal	2 episodes
1954 - 1955	Meet Corliss Archer	Harry Archer	Main role
1959 - 1961	Wanted: Dead or Alive	Matthew Wilson / Phineos Porter	
