= Aviner =

Aviner (Hebrew: אבינר) is a surname. Notable people with the surname include:

- Shlomo Aviner (born 1943), Israeli Orthodox rabbi
- Susan Aviner (1949–2011), American actress

== See also ==
- Abner, cousin of King Saul
