= Electric Theatre (radio series) =

American radio anthology series (1948–1949)

Electric Theatre is an American old-time radio anthology series that was broadcast on CBS from October 3, 1948, to May 29, 1949. The name was also seen as Electric Theater.

== Overview ==
Helen Hayes was the star and the host for this series, which presented adaptations of stage plays in addition to original scripts. Hayes's commitment to complete an engagement on stage in London prevented her from appearing on the program for its first weeks. She first appeared on the show on November 14, 1948. During her absence, Henry Fonda, Basil Rathbone, and Margaret Sullavan were the hosts and stars on different weeks.

== Unexpected end ==
Hayes intended to return in October 1949 for another season of the program. Initial plans said that summer replacements for it would be two situation comedies, first Young Love and then Meet Corliss Archer. (Another source reported only Young Love as the replacement.) A week later, a change in plans had Earn Your Vacation, a quiz series for teachers, taking the time slot beginning on June 5, 1949, with Meet Corliss Archer replacing it beginning on July 31, 1949, while Young Love was moved to a different time slot in the summer schedule. The program's return was less certain after Hayes's daughter, actress Mary MacArthur, died on September 22, 1949. An announcement said that Meet Corliss Archer "will continue indefinitely" while Hayes rested. By late October, Hayes had canceled the program, and Meet Corliss Archer continued in its place.

== Episodes ==
Partial List of Episodes of Electric Theatre
Date	Episode	Actor(s)
October 3, 1948	"One Sunday Afternoon"	Henry Fonda
October 10, 1948	"The Amazing Dr. Clitterhouse"	Basil Rathbone
October 17, 1948	"A Church Mouse"	Margaret Sullavan
November 14, 1948	"Victoria Regina"	Helen Hayes
November 28, 1948	"Angel Street"	Hayes
December 5, 1948	"Dark Victory"	Hayes
January 30, 1949	"The Enemy"	Hayes
February 27, 1949	"The Damask Cheek"	Hayes
March 13, 1949	"Autumn Crocus"	Hayes
March 20, 1949	"Saturday's Children"	Hayes
March 27, 1949	"The Farmer Takes a Wife"	Hayes
April 24, 1949	"Manhattan Pastorale"	Hayes
May 29, 1949	"His Name Is Jason"	Hayes

== Production ==
Joseph Stauffer was the producer, and Lester O'Keefe was the director. Vladimir Selinsky directed the orchestra, and Robert Cenedella was the writer. Electric Theatre originated from New York City and was sponsored by a consortium of electric companies. The N. W. Ayer & Son advertising agency oversaw the contractual arrangements between Hayes and the sponsor. The program was broadcast on Sundays from 9 to 9:30 p.m. Eastern Time. Its competition included Walter Winchell's show on ABC.
