= The Life of Riley =

American radio situation comedy series of the 1940s

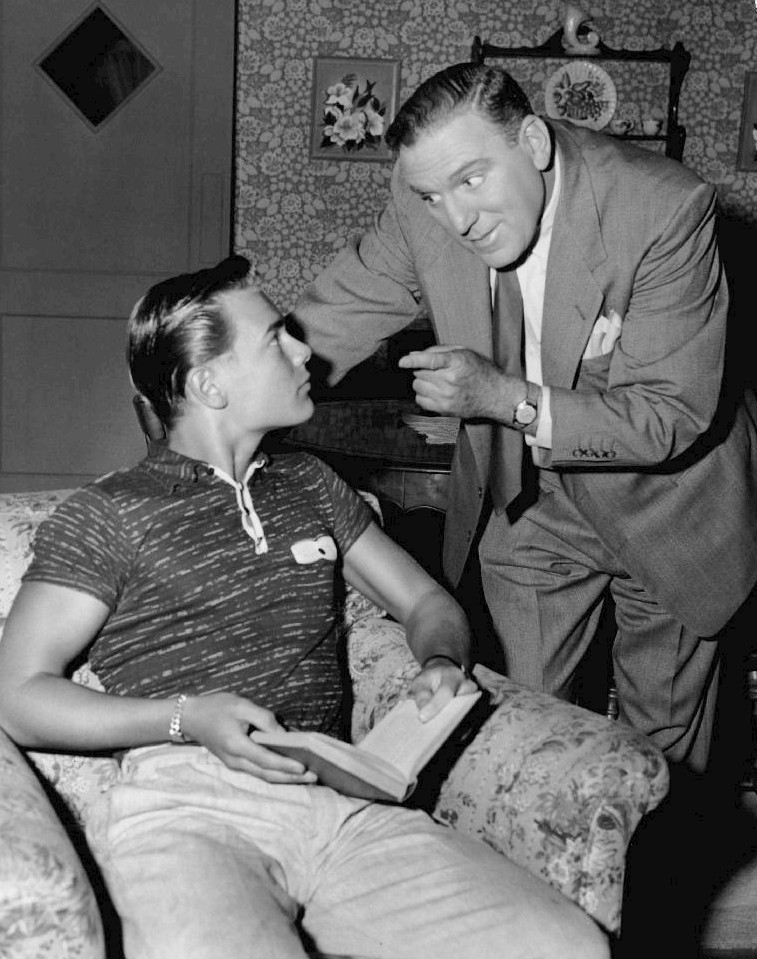
Wesley Morgan and William Bendix, 1956

The Life of Riley is an American radio situation comedy series of the 1940s that was adapted into a 1949 feature film, as well as two different television series, and a comic book.

== Radio series ==
The Life of Riley
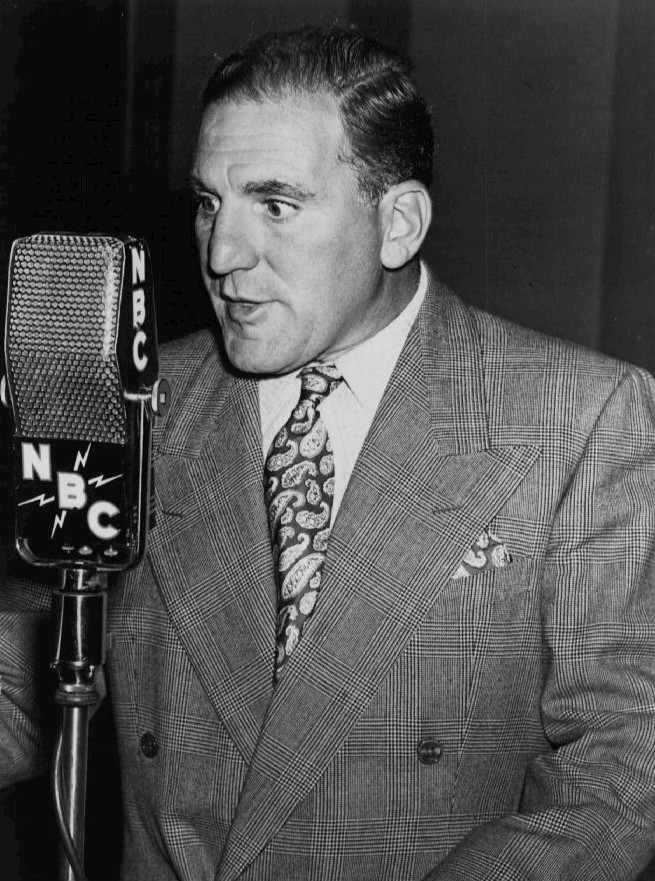
- William Bendix as Chester A. Riley
- Genre: Situation comedy
- Running time: 30 minutes
- Country of origin: United States
- Language: English
- Syndicates: ABC; NBC
- TV adaptations: The Life of Riley
- Starring: William Bendix; John Brown; Grace Coppin; Paula Winslowe
- Announcer: Ken Niles; Ken Carpenter; Jimmy Wallington
- Created by: Irving Brecher
- Written by: Alan Lipscott; Reuben Ship
- Produced by: Irving Brecher
- Original release: January 16, 1944 – June 29, 1951
- Sponsored by: Prell Shampoo; Teel; Pabst Blue Ribbon; Dreft; American Meat Institute

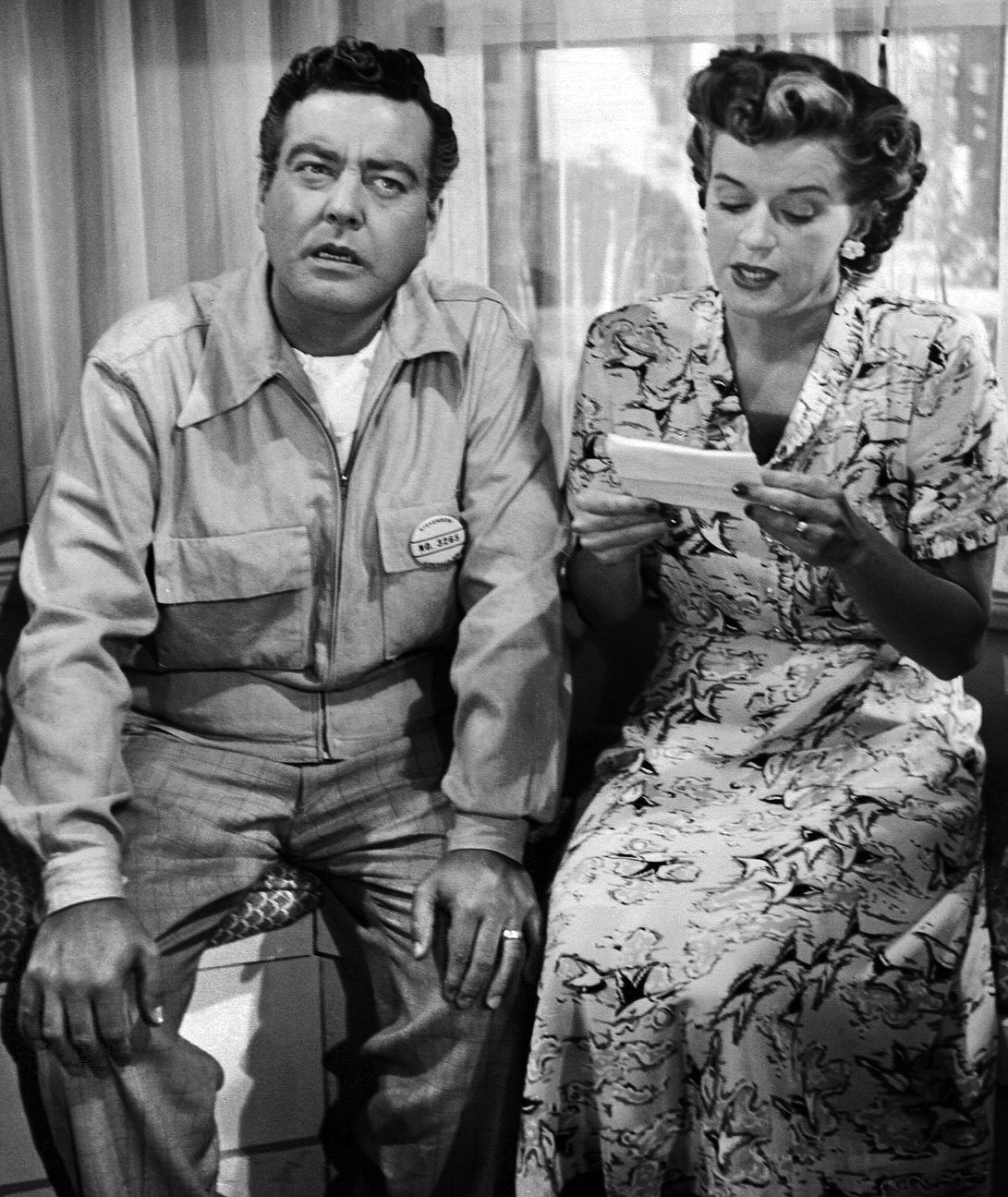
Jackie Gleason and Rosemary DeCamp in the original 1949 television series

The radio program initially aired on the Blue Network (later known as ABC) from January 16, 1944, to July 8, 1945, it then moved to NBC, where it was broadcast from September 8, 1945, to June 29, 1951.

Irving Brecher pitched the radio series for friend Groucho Marx under the title The Flotsam Family, but the sponsor balked at what would have been essentially a straight head-of-household role for Marx. (Marx would get his own series Blue Ribbon Town instead.) Brecher then saw William Bendix as taxicab company owner Tim McGuerin in Hal Roach's The McGuerins from Brooklyn (1942). Radio historian Gerald Nachman quotes Brecher as stating, "He was a Brooklyn guy and there was something about him. I thought, this guy could play it. He'd made a few films, like Lifeboat, but he was not a name. So I took The Flotsam Family script, revised it, made it a Brooklyn family, took out the flippancies and made it more meat-and-potatoes, and thought of a new title, The Life of Riley. Bendix's delivery and the spin he put on his lines made it work."

The reworked script cast Bendix in the title role of blundering Chester A. Riley, a wing riveter at the fictional Cunningham Aircraft plant in California. His frequent exclamation of indignation—"What a revoltin' development this is!"—became one of the most famous catchphrases of the 1940s. It was later reused by Benjamin J. Grimm of the Fantastic Four. The radio series also benefited from the immense popularity of a supporting character, Digby "Digger" O'Dell (John Brown), "the friendly undertaker." Brecher told Brown, "I want a very sepulchral voice, quavering, morbid," and he got it right away.

The supporting cast featured Paula Winslowe as Riley's wife, Peg, and as Riley's mother-in law; Brown as O'Dell and as Riley's co-worker Jim Gillis; Francis "Dink" Trout as Waldo Binney; Tommy Cook, Bobby Ellis and Scotty Beckett as Junior at various times during the show's run; Barbara Eiler as Riley's daughter, Babs; Shirley Mitchell as Honeybee Gillis; Hans Conried as Uncle Baxter; and Alan Reed as multiple characters, including Riley's boss (Mr. Stevenson) and Peg's father. Henry Morgan voiced Riley's father in one episode. Mel Blanc provided some voices as well, including that of Junior's dog Tiger as well as that of a dog catcher who claimed to have a special bond with dogs.

Gillis often gave Riley bad information that got him into trouble, whereas Digger gave him good information that "helped him out of a hole," as he might have put it. Brown's lines as the undertaker were often repetitive, including puns based on his profession; but thanks to Brown's delivery, the audience loved him. The program was broadcast live with a studio audience, most of whom were not aware Brown played both characters. As a result, when Digger delivered his first line, it was usually greeted with howls of laughter and applause from surprised audience members.

The series was co-developed by the nonperforming Marx Brother turned agent Gummo. The American Meat Institute (1944–45), Procter & Gamble (Teel dentifrice and Prell shampoo) (1945–49), and Pabst Blue Ribbon beer (1949–51) took turns as the radio program's sponsor.

An unrelated radio show with the title Life of Riley was a summer replacement show heard on CBS from April 12, 1941, to September 6, 1941. The CBS program starred Lionel Stander as J. Riley Farnsworth and had no real connection with the more famous series that followed a few years later.

== The Life of Riley: Film ==
William Bendix also starred in the 1949 film version of The Life of Riley directed by Irving Brecher. It earned $1.6 million in the U.S. and Canada, but prevented him from starring in the TV series that began in the same year.

== Television ==
The Life of Riley
- Genre: Situation comedy
- Starring: Jackie Gleason (1949–1950); William Bendix (1953–1958)
- Country of origin: United States
- Original language: English
- No. of seasons: 6

Production
- Running time: 30 minutes

Original release
- Network: NBC
- Release: October 4, 1949 – August 22, 1958

In 1948, NBC broadcast "two live television test programs based on the radio series." The April 13 episode starred Herb Vigran as Riley, and the April 20 episode had Buddy Gray in the title role. A third episode was also produced the same year with Lon Chaney Jr. as Riley and DeCamp as Peg, but not aired. It is available on various public domain DVD releases.

=== Television series ===
The NBC television adaptation, also created by Irving Brecher, was a single-season series from October 4, 1949, to March 28, 1950. Originally, William Bendix was to have appeared on both radio and TV, but Bendix's RKO Radio Pictures movie contract prevented him from appearing on the TV version.

Jackie Gleason starred, with Rosemary DeCamp replacing Paula Winslowe as wife Peg, Gloria Winters as daughter Barbara (Babs), Lanny Rees as son Chester Jr. (Junior), and Sid Tomack as Jim Gillis, Riley's manipulative best buddy and next-door neighbor. John Brown returned as the morbid, counseling undertaker Digby (Digger) O'Dell.

It was during this period that Gleason played Riley on one episode of the radio series. At the beginning of the November 11, 1949 radio episode the announcer explained that William Bendix had strained his voice while performing the role of an umpire for an upcoming film (Kill the Umpire) and Gleason substituted for him that one night.

=== Award ===
Life of Riley won the first Emmy Award (for "Best Film Made For and Shown on Television") with Groucho Marx receiving a credit for the story. However, it came to an end after 26 episodes because Irving Brecher and sponsor Pabst Brewing Company reached an impasse on extending the series for a full 39-week season.

=== Episodes ===
No.	Title	Original release date
1	"Tonsils"	October 4, 1949
2	"Babs and Simon Step Out"	October 11, 1949
3	"Egbert's Chemistry Set"	October 18, 1949
4	"The French Professor"	October 25, 1949
5	"Nervous Breakdown"	November 1, 1949
6	"Assistant Manager"	November 8, 1949
With Mary Treen.
7	"Riley's Birthday Gift"	November 15, 1949
8	"Riley, Gillis, and Vanderhopper, Inc."	November 22, 1949
9	"Junior Falls for Teacher"	November 29, 1949
10	"Night School"	December 6, 1949
11	"Prom Dress"	December 13, 1949
12	"Junior's Birthday Party"	December 20, 1949
13	"The Boarder"	December 27, 1949
14	"Peg's Birthday"	January 3, 1950
15	"Junior Drops Out"	January 10, 1950
16	"Riley's Firstborn"	January 17, 1950
17	"Insurance"	January 24, 1950
18	"The Gambler"	January 31, 1950
19	"Acting Lessons"	February 7, 1950
20	"Valentine's Day"	February 14, 1950
21	"Home Sweet Home"	February 21, 1950
22	"South American Job"	February 28, 1950
23	"Riley's Quarrel"	March 7, 1950
24	"Junior and the Bully"	March 14, 1950
25	"The Banned Book"	March 21, 1950
26	"Five Dollar Bill"	March 28, 1950

=== Television series reboot ===
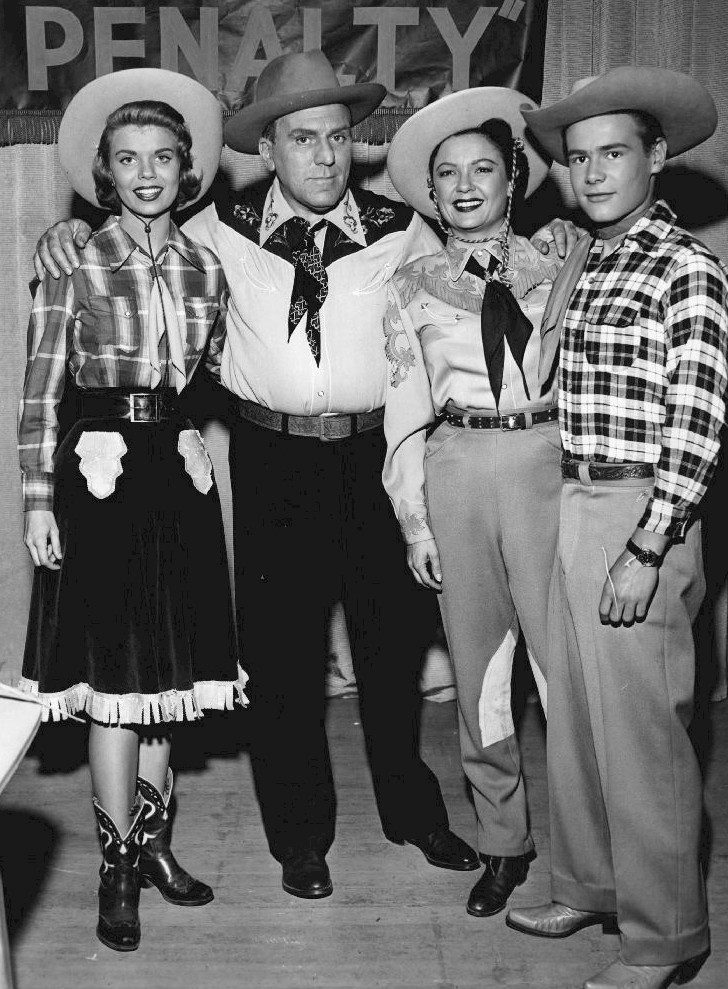
The Riley family. From left: Lugene Sanders (Babs), William Bendix (Chester A. Riley), Marjorie Reynolds (Peg), and Wesley Morgan (Junior).

The second TV series ran for six seasons, from January 2, 1953, to May 23, 1958. It was produced by Tom McKnight for NBC and featured William Bendix. He was supported by Marjorie Reynolds, replacing both Paula Winslowe and Rosemary DeCamp, as wife Peg; Tom D'Andrea as schemer buddy Jim Gillis; Gloria Blondell (sister of Joan Blondell) as Gillis's wife, Honeybee, and Gregory Marshall as their son Egbert; Lugene Sanders was Babs and Wesley Morgan was Junior. The character of Digger O'Dell was not resurrected as a result of actor John Brown having been placed on the Hollywood blacklist. Sterling Holloway recurred as neighbor Waldo Binney, another radio character. Henry Kulky played Otto Schmidlap, Riley's co-worker at the airplane plant.

Nevertheless, this Life of Riley series with Bendix was a ratings hit, ranking at No. 16 in its first season, with four of its six seasons in the top 30, and ran for a total of 217 episodes. It then went into syndicated reruns. The latter portion of the fifth season, broadcast between April and June 1957, was filmed and originally broadcast in color, although only black-and-white film prints of those episodes were syndicated. For the final season, filming reverted to black-and-white. Sponsors of the TV show included Pabst Blue Ribbon Beer (1949–50), Gulf Oil (1953–58) and Lever Brothers (1957–58). In the 1955–1956 season, the Riley family moved and were given new neighbors portrayed by Florence Sundstrom and George O'Hanlon.

In all of the show's incarnations, the comedic plotlines centered around Riley himself, a gullible and occasionally clumsy (but big-hearted) man, and the doings and undoings of his family. Riley's penchant for turning mere trouble into near-disaster through his well-intentioned bumbling was often aided or instigated by his arch best friend/next-door neighbor, Gillis.

Bendix and Rosemary DeCamp reprised the roles in an hour-long radio adaptation of the feature film that was presented on Lux Radio Theatre on May 8, 1950.

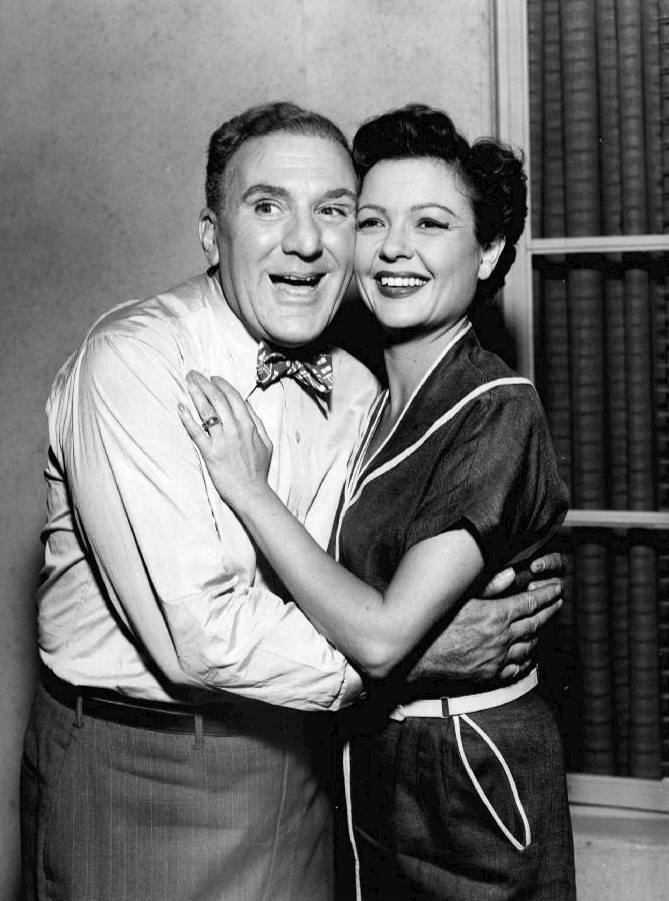
Chester and Peg Riley

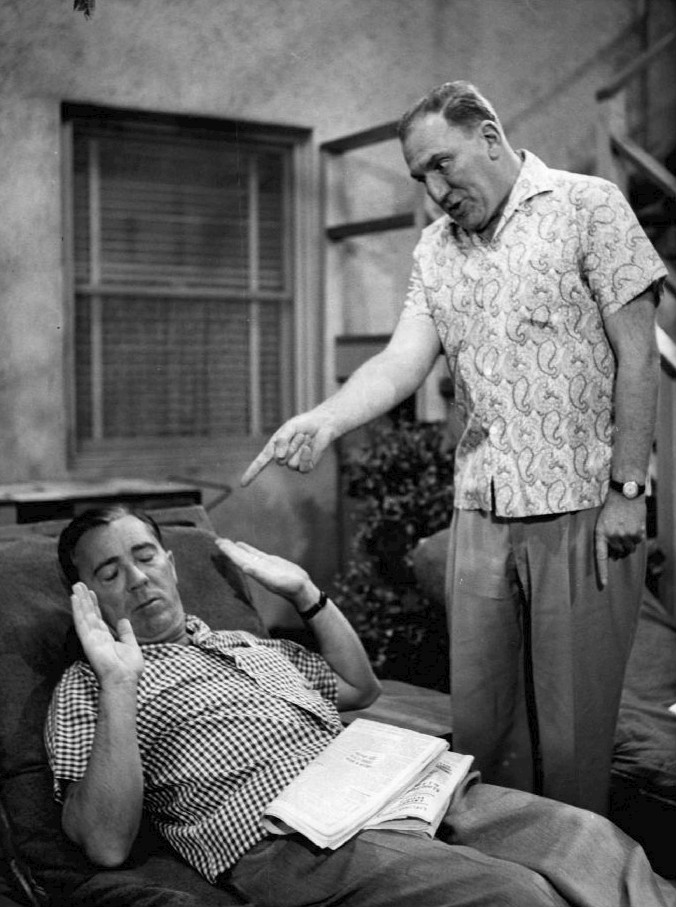
Riley and Gillis

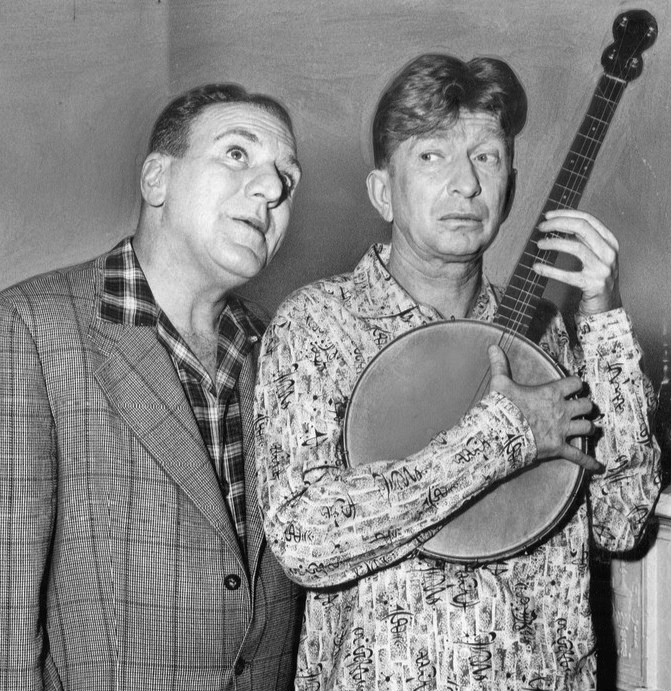
William Bendix and Sterling Holloway, 1957

== Comic book ==
A comic book adaptation of the show was produced by Dell Comics in 1958 as part of their Four Color series of one-shots.
