= Lugene Sanders =

American actress

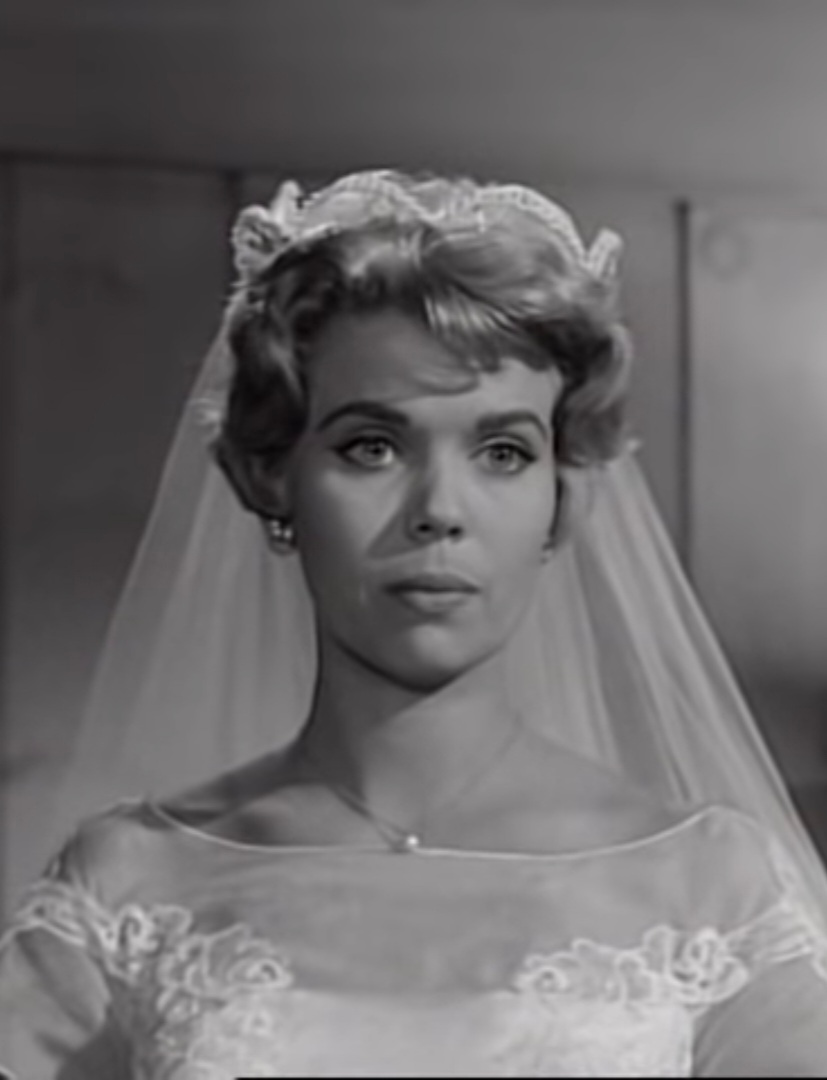
- Sanders in Tormented (1960)
- Born: Trevalene Lugene Sanders; September 17, 1934 (age 91) or September 17, 1935 (age 90); Oklahoma City, Oklahoma, U.S.
- Other name: Lugene Solomon
- Occupations: Actress, former child star
- Years active: 1951–1960
- Spouse: Marvin Solomon (m. 1954)
- Children: 2, including Kimberly Quinn

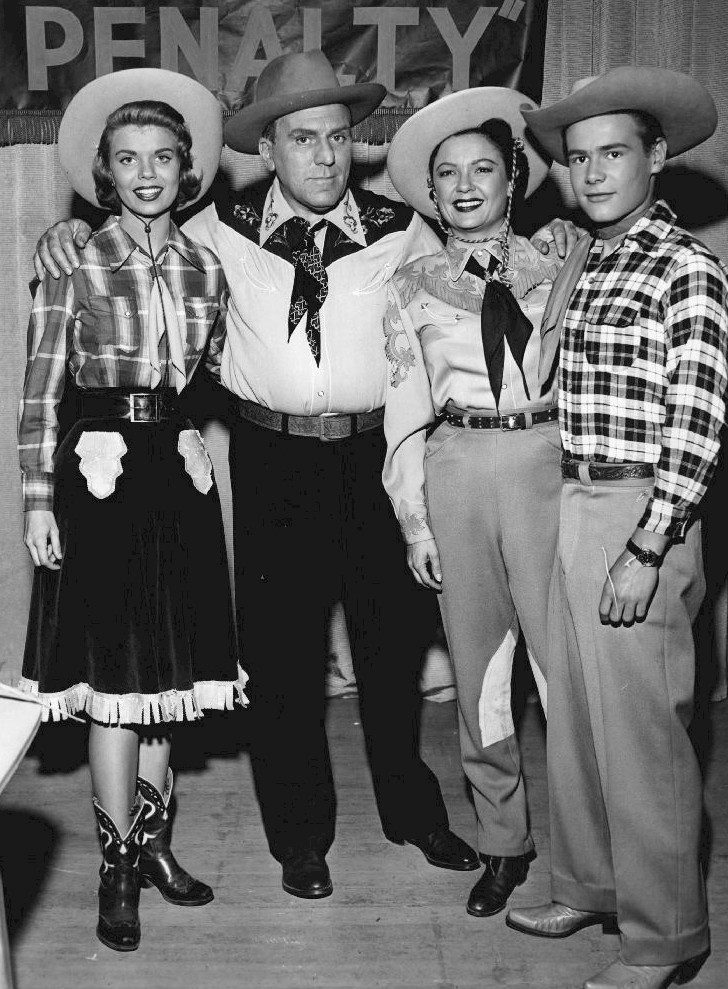
Cast of TV's The Life of Riley, L-R: Lugene Sanders, William Bendix, Marjorie Reynolds, and Wesley Morgan

Trevalene Lugene Solomon (born September 17, 1934 or 1935) is an American retired actress and former child star. The peak of her career was during the mid-1950s. Before getting married and retiring from acting in the early 1960s, Solomon went under the name Lugene Sanders.

== Early life ==
Trevalene Sanders was born in Oklahoma City, Oklahoma in 1934 or 1935 to parents Charles and Genevieve Sanders. Before moving to Los Angeles with her mother in the late 1940s, Sanders attended Capitol Hill High School and Hollywood Professional School and graduated from USC. Her first theatrical experience came when she was 13 and played Amy in a local production of Little Women.

== Radio ==
Sanders was one of three actresses to have the title role in Meet Corliss Archer.

== Television ==
Sanders is best remembered for portraying the role of Barbara "Babs" Riley, the teenage daughter of Chester and Peg Riley on the second television incarnation of radio's The Life of Riley on NBC. She was on the show for its entire six season run from 1953-1958. After Riley, Sanders had very few roles in television and film. She co-starred in the film Tormented (1960) where she played the role of Meg Hubbard alongside Richard Carlson and Susan Gordon.

She also had a stint as the star of a short-lived CBS television series Meet Corliss Archer based on the successful radio program of the same name. Sanders played the title role. The series, however was only meant to air as a summer replacement series and did not make it to the fall schedule and was off the air by September 1951. Another live syndicated television version aired for 5 months in 1953 but Sanders was not involved in it. She retired from acting in 1960 to raise her family.

Sanders was featured on the cover of TV Guide's November 27, 1953, issue.

== Personal life ==
Sanders married Marvin Solomon in the gardens of the Bel-Air Hotel on March 18, 1954.

Solomon is a retired businessman who specialized in hospital equipment. The Solomons have two daughters together. The first, Jennifer Solomon, splits her time between San Francisco, Lake Tahoe, and Buenos Aires and is a successful businesswoman and dancer. The younger, Kimberly Quinn, formerly Kimberly Fortier, is a journalist, commentator, magazine writer, and author.

Sanders and Solomon are both retired and live in California. They have four grandchildren.

== Filmography ==
- Meet Corliss Archer (1951) (Corliss Archer)
- The Life of Riley (1953-1958) (Babs Riley-Marshall; 59 episodes)
- Richard Diamond, Private Detective (1957) (Eve Miller; Episode: "Merry-Go-Round Case")
- Tormented (1960) (Meg Hubbard)
