= Meet Corliss Archer (TV series) =

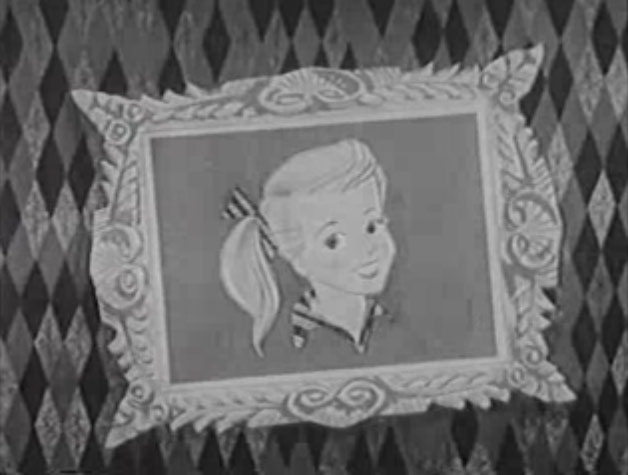
- Corliss Archer depicted in the title sequence
- Genre: Sitcom
- Written by: Jerry Adelman; Margaret Coffey; Tom Coffey; Jerome S. Goetler; Lee Loeb; Phil Shuken; Rik Vollaertz
- Directed by: Lewis Allen; Leon Benson; Eddie Davis; Leslie Goodwins; Lambert Hillyer; Herbert L. Strock
- Starring: Ann Baker; Mary Brian; John Eldredge
- Narrated by: Hy Averback
- Country of origin: United States
- Original language: English
- No. of seasons: 1
- No. of episodes: 39

Production
- Executive producer: Frederick W. Ziv
- Producers: Eddie Davis; Lewis Allen; Herbert L. Strock
- Animator: Gene Hazelton
- Camera setup: Multi-camera
- Running time: 30 minutes
- Production company: Ziv Television Programs

Original release
- Network: Syndication
- Release: April 2 – December 24, 1954

Related
- Meet Corliss Archer

Meet Corliss Archer is an American television sitcom that was broadcast on CBS between July 13 and August 10, 1951, and in syndication via the Ziv Company from April to December 1954. It was an adaptation of the radio series of the same name, which was based on a series of short stories introduced in 1943 Good Housekeeping magazine. by F. Hugh Herbert. It was also broadcast in Canada.

== Synopsis ==
Corliss Archer is a lovable blonde teenager who is delicately balancing her high-school life and relationship with her goofy boyfriend Dexter Franklin, and her homelife with parents Harry and Janet Archer.

== CBS version ==
In the summer of 1951 the program was broadcast live to midwestern stations on Thursday night each week while other CBS stations aired Your Esso Reporter. The cast reassembled on Friday nights and performed the same episode live for the rest of the network's stations.

=== Cast ===
Actor	Role
Lugene Sanders	Corliss Archer
Frieda Inescort, later Irene Tedrow	Janet Archer
Fred Shields	Harry Archer
Robert Ellis	Dexter Franklin
Ken Christy	Bill Franklin

Source: Encyclopedia of Television Shows, 1925 through 2010

== Syndicated version ==
=== Cast ===
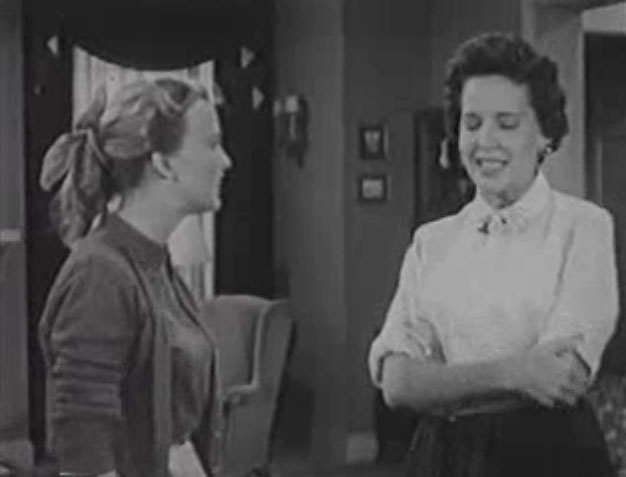
Ann Baker and Mary Brian in the episode "Corliss the Cheerleader"

Actor	Role
Ann Baker	Corliss Archer
Mary Brian	Janet Archer
John Eldredge	Harry Archer
Robert Ellis	Dexter Franklin
Ken Christy	Bill Franklin
Vera Marshe	Mary Franklin

Episodes

The episodes are:

1. No Clothes for the Party
2. Harry, Child Psychiatrist
3. Episode 3
4. Dexter, The Director
5. Dexter's Surprise Party
6. The Algebra Problem
7. Quarenteened
8. The Phone Fumble
9. Dexter's Job
10. Harry's Cold
11. Dexter, The Helper
12. The Best Policy
13. Harry's Diet
14. The Vase That Came for Dinner
15. Corliss, The Cheerleader
16. The Archers Get a Maid
17. Dexter Becomes a Man
18. Dexter's Masquerade Costume
19. Episode 19
20. The Male Ego
21. Money Matters
22. A Party for Corliss
23. The New Neighbors
24. Harry and the Soap Opera Queen
25. A Date for Doris
26. Friends Forever
27. Boat Builders
28. Miffy's Overnight Painting
29. The Pain in the Neck
30. President of the Garden Club
31. The Fortune Teller
32. Harry, The Dictator
33. Harry Gives Advice
34. Dexter Borrows Harry's Car
35. Harry, The Photographer
36. The Personality Test
37. Janet Goes to College
38. How to Handle Women
39. The Christmas Story
40. Christmas Gifts
41. Dexter's Masquerade Party

== Production notes ==
The syndicated version of Meet Corliss Archer was executive produced by Frederick W. Ziv and produced by ZIV Television Programs.

== Syndication and DVD release ==
The series, which is in the public domain, is occasionally still repeated in the United States, usually on small over-the-air networks and cable channels. It has also appeared on DVDs by companies such as Alpha Video, Echo Bridge and Mill Creek.
