= Kimberly Quinn =

Kimberly Quinn may refer to:

- Kimberly Quinn (journalist) (born 1961), American journalist
- Kimberly Quinn (actress), American actress
