= Picture Mommy Dead =

1966 film by Bert I. Gordon

- Theatrical release poster
- Directed by: Bert I. Gordon
- Written by: Robert Sherman
- Produced by: Bert I. Gordon
- Starring: Don Ameche; Martha Hyer; Susan Gordon; Zsa Zsa Gabor; Maxwell Reed; Wendell Corey; Signe Hasso; Anna Lee
- Cinematography: Ellsworth Fredricks
- Edited by: John A. Bushelman
- Music by: Robert Drasnin
- Production company: Bert I. Gordon Productions
- Distributed by: Embassy Pictures
- Release date: September 29, 1966 (Roanoke, Virginia)
- Running time: 82 minutes
- Country: United States
- Language: English
- Budget: $1 million

Picture Mommy Dead is a 1966 American psychological horror film directed by Bert I. Gordon and starring Don Ameche, Martha Hyer, Susan Gordon, and Zsa Zsa Gabor. It follows Susan Shelley, a young girl who, after being released from a mental institution following her mother Jessica's death, begins to experience strange events in the family's mansion.

== Plot ==
Socialite Jessica Flagmore Shelley is killed when her bed catches fire. Three years later, her adolescent daughter, Susan, is released from St. Marie's Convent and Hospital, after recovering from a nervous breakdown. Though deemed mentally healthy, Susan is still confused about the circumstances of her mother's death. She is now in the custody of her father, Edward, and stepmother, Francene. Susan also becomes reacquainted with her older cousin Anthony Flagmore. Soon, she is read her mother's will, detailing hundreds of thousands of dollars that she will receive at age 25. Further, Susan can resume living in the Flagmore mansion as long as she likes. However, its contents and furniture will be auctioned to generate income to cover losses from Edward's bad investments. Later, in private, Francene suggests Edward have Susan recommitted to gain control of her trust fund. But Edward dismisses the idea.

One evening, while haunted by disturbing visions, Susan scratches a portrait of her mother. It bleeds. She then experiences an image of Jessica bursting into flames. As a result, Susan deduces that Jessica was murdered, and evidence of this exists somewhere in the house. Later, Susan is attacked by Cousin Anthony's pet hawk. She beats it dead with one of her dolls. Inside the tattered doll, Susan discovers Jessica's valuable heirloom, a necklace. Moments later, Francene enters the room, posing as Jessica, and requests the necklace. Susan feigns mental regression. This leads to a violent altercation. The two knock over a phone receiver, through which Francene overhears Anthony on an extension phoning police to report Susan as Jessica's murderer. Later that evening, Francene confronts Anthony, and their conversation is overheard by Susan. It is revealed the two, who are lovers, conspire to steal Susan's fortune. Yet they argue how. Their plot ends when an enraged Francene murders Anthony with a large antique fishing hook.

Francene then accuses Susan of stealing her necklace, replicating the scenario that occurred between Susan and Jessica the night she burned to death. Their feud intensifies when Francene pursues Susan through the house with a pair of scissors. The chase ends in the bedroom, where Susan renders Francene unconscious before knocking over a candle and igniting the bed in flames. Edward stumbles upon the scene and puts out the fire. Francene awakens, gripping the necklace in her hand, claiming Susan killed both Jessica and Anthony. Francene then attempts to blackmail Edward with Susan's alleged culpability and threatens divorce. Edward tells Francene that it was in fact he who killed Jessica to appease Francene, who now laughs hysterically. In a rage, Edward strangles Francene just as he had Jessica. Susan appears from behind a curtain and takes Jessica's necklace from Francene's neck. She tells Edward she will help hide his crime—just as she had when he murdered Jessica—before lighting the bedroom aflame with a candle. The two exit the house, hand in hand, as it begins to burn.

== Cast ==
- Don Ameche as Edward Shelley
- Martha Hyer as Francene Shelley
- Susan Gordon as Susan Shelley
- Zsa Zsa Gabor as Jessica Flagmore Shelley
- Maxwell Reed as Anthony Flagmore
- Wendell Corey as Clayborn
- Signe Hasso as Sister René
- Anna Lee as Elsie Kornwald
- Steffi Henderson as 3rd Woman at Eatate Sale
- Kelly Corcoran as Little Boy at Estate Sale
- Paulle Clark as 1st Woman at Estate Sale
- Marlene Tracy as 2nd Woman at Estate

== Production ==
Gene Tierney was originally announced for a lead role and Hedy Lamarr was signed to support Don Ameche and Martha Hyer. However, Lamarr was fired from the film when she collapsed during filming from nervous exhaustion. She was replaced by Zsa Zsa Gabor.

== Release ==
=== Box office ===
Picture Mommy Dead opened theatrically in Roanoke, Virginia on September 29, 1966. It opened in New York City on November 2, 1966, before being released citywide in Los Angeles in December 1966. The film was a box-office failure.

=== Critical response ===
The film opened to largely negative reviews upon its release in New York City. Dennis Schwartz (grading the film a B−) called it a tired horror film but "entertaining in a B film manner", highlighting the attempts at fright scenes involving hearing voices along with tacky attacks.

=== Home media ===
Kino Lorber released the film for the first time on Blu-ray in October 2020.

== See also ==
- List of American films of 1966
