= The Fugitive (The Twilight Zone) =

- The Twilight Zone episode
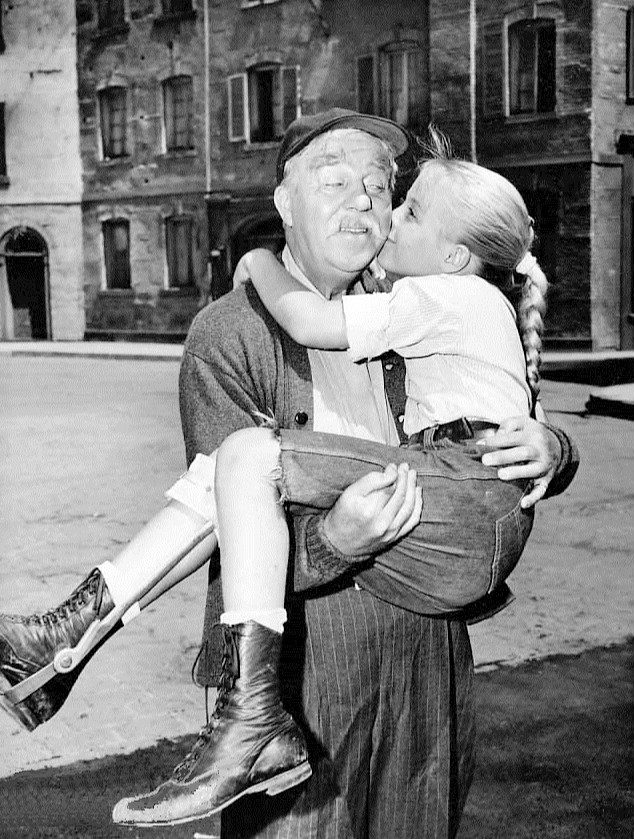
- J. Pat O'Malley as Old Ben and Susan Gordon as Jenny
- Episode no.: Season 3 Episode 25
- Directed by: Richard L. Bare
- Written by: Charles Beaumont
- Production code: 4816
- Original air date: March 9, 1962

Guest appearances
- J. Pat O'Malley: Old Ben; Susan Gordon: Jenny; Nancy Kulp: Mrs. Gann; Wesley Lau: First Pursuer; Paul Tripp: Second Pursuer; Russ Bender: Doctor; Stephen Talbot: Howie Gutliff; Johnny Eiman: Pitcher

Episode chronology
← Previous "To Serve Man"	Next → "Little Girl Lost"
- The Twilight Zone (1959 TV series) season 3

"The Fugitive" is episode 90 of the American television anthology series The Twilight Zone.

== Opening narration ==
It's been said that science fiction and fantasy are two different things: science fiction, the improbable made possible; fantasy, the impossible made probable. What would you have if you put these two different things together? Well, you'd have an old man named Ben who knows a lot of tricks most people don't know and a little girl named Jenny who loves him — and a journey into the heart - of the Twilight Zone.

== Plot ==
At a public park, a group of children are playing softball with Old Ben, an elderly but playful gentleman. When it is Old Ben's turn at bat, he hits the ball over the fence and out of sight. When they play "Spaceman", Old Ben takes on the form of a shelled monster. The kids are accustomed to Old Ben's supernatural abilities, referring to them as his "magic".

Old Ben's favorite of the children is Jenny, who walks with a leg brace. Old Ben carries her to her home, where she lives with her shrewish and unsympathetic aunt, Agnes Gann. As they approach the row house, Ben causes his roller skates to dematerialize. This phenomenon is observed by two men who are watching the house from across the street. They enter the apartment building, identify themselves as police, and question Agnes about Ben. Jenny overhears the conversation and limps upstairs to Old Ben's apartment to warn him. Old Ben takes on the form of a mouse, fooling the men into thinking he has left his apartment.

Jenny takes the "mouse" back to her room. Old Ben tells Jenny that he is an alien from another planet, and that his appearance is only a disguise, as he is a fugitive from justice. Old Ben says he must flee to another planet, but before departing he uses a device to heal Jenny's leg. The two strangers run into Jenny walking down the stairs without her brace. They recognize Old Ben's handiwork, but Jenny refuses to tell them anything. One of the men uses a device to make Jenny deathly ill, using her as bait for Ben.

Old Ben comes back to Jenny's room and makes her well again. The two men approach and address Old Ben as "Your Majesty". Old Ben admits to Jenny he is not a criminal, but the king of his planet; Ben fled because he tired after 1,000 years of the elaborate ceremony and responsibilities of being king. The strangers tell Jenny that Old Ben's people love him as much as she does; they want him to return and continue his 5,000-year reign. Jenny insists that if Old Ben cannot stay with her, she will go with him. The two men say this is forbidden, but allow Old Ben a moment alone with Jenny to say goodbye after he promises not to run away. Following a plan whispered to him by Jenny, Ben transforms into her exact duplicate, forcing the men to take both of them along since they cannot tell one from the other.

Rod Serling later holds up a photograph of a handsome young man that Mrs. Gann will find under Jenny's pillow, noting that the photo shows Old Ben's true appearance. When Jenny grows up, she will become a queen.

== Closing narration ==
Mrs. Gann will be in for a big surprise when she finds this under Jenny's pillow, because Mrs. Gann has more temper than imagination. She'll never dream that this is a picture of Old Ben, as he really looks, and it will never occur to her that eventually her niece will grow up to be an honest-to-goodness queen — somewhere in The Twilight Zone.
