= Juli Reding =

American actress (1935–2021)

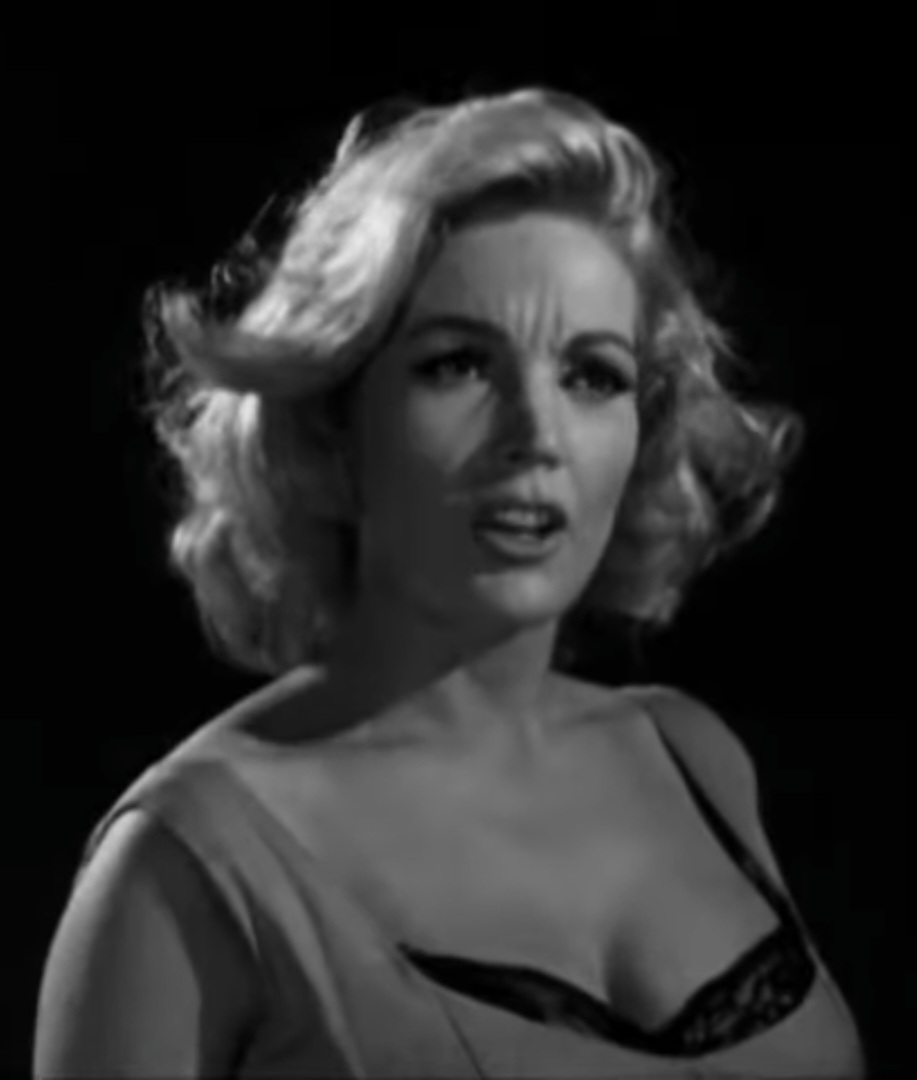
- Reding in Tormented (1960)
- Born: Esther Fay Reding; November 28, 1935; Quanah, Texas, U.S.
- Died: September 16, 2021 (aged 85); Springfield, Missouri, U.S.
- Other names: Juli Reding Hutner, Juli Otis
- Occupations: Actress; model
- Years active: 1957–1988
- Notable work: Tormented (1960)
- Spouse(s): Phillip Carter (m. 1951; div. 1951); George Franklin Hildebrandt (m. 1951; div. 19??); Joseph Digiovanni (m. 1960; div. 19??) Reese Hale Taylor Jr. (m. 1962; div. 1964) Herbert Hutner (m. 1969; died 2008)
- Children: 2

Esther Fay Reding Hutner (November 28, 1935 – September 16, 2021), better known as Juli Reding, was an American actress and model, best known for her role in the Bert I. Gordon horror film, Tormented (1960).

== Early life ==
Esther Fay Reding was born in Quanah, Texas on November 28, 1935, and raised in Branson, Missouri, one of seven children born to Roy Reding and Ruth Wallace Reding. Her parents owned an antique shop in Branson.

== Career ==
Reding, usually presented as a curvaceous platinum blonde starlet, won a Warner Brothers contract in a publicity contest in the 1950s. She appeared in several films, most notably the horror film Tormented (1960), and murder mystery Mission in Morocco (1959). She also appeared on the covers and in pinup pages of magazines including Scamp, Escapade, Fling, Vagabond, Vue, and Foto-Rama. She held various beauty titles, including "Princess Juliet of Verona", "Miss Welder of 1960", "Miss Los Angeles Press Club", and "Miss Los Angeles Dodger". In 1970, she was president of Preservation Of Our Femininity and Finances (POOFF), a publicity effort aimed at defending the miniskirt.

Later in life, Juli Reding Hutner was a socialite in Los Angeles, often photographed at charity galas. She was named to the board of directors of the Hollywood Entertainment Museum in 1994.

== Personal life and death ==
Reding married five times. In 1951, she married George Franklin Hildebrandt, who was also from Missouri. She had twin sons born in the 1950s. Another husband was attorney Reese Hale Taylor Jr.; they married in 1962 and divorced in 1964. Her last husband was executive Herbert Hutner; they were married from 1969 until his death in 2008. Reding died in Springfield, Missouri on September 16, 2021, at the age of 85.

== Film and television credits ==
- Mr. Adams and Eve (1957, television)
- Mission in Morocco (1960)
- 77 Sunset Strip (1960, television)
- Tormented (1960)
- Why Must I Die? (1960)
- Lock-Up (1960, television)
- Sea Hunt (1961, television)
- King of Diamonds (1961, television)
- The Adventures of Ozzie and Harriet (1961, television)
- Burke's Law (1964 and 1965, television)
- Dr. Kildare (1966, television)
- The Big Valley (1967, television)
- Murder, She Wrote (1988, television)
