= J. Pat O'Malley =

English actor (1904–1985)

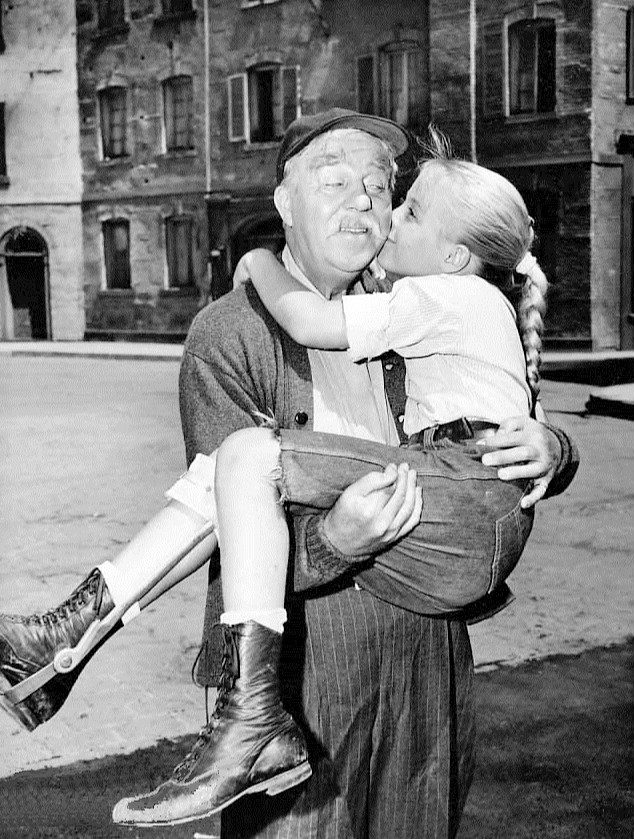
- J. Pat O'Malley and Susan Gordon in "The Fugitive", a 1962 episode of The Twilight Zone
- Born: James Patrick O'Malley; 15 March 1904; Burnley, Lancashire, England
- Died: 27 February 1985 (aged 80); San Juan Capistrano, California, U.S.
- Occupations: Actor; singer
- Years active: 1925–1982
- Spouse: Fay M. O'Malley (m. 1936)
- Children: 2

James Patrick O'Malley (15 March 1904 – 27 February 1985) was an English actor and singer who appeared in many American films and television programmes from the 1940s to 1982, using the stage name J. Pat O'Malley. He also appeared on the Broadway stage in Ten Little Indians (1944) and Dial M for Murder (1954).

The New York Times drama critic Theodore Goldsmith praised O'Malley's performance in Ten Little Indians, calling him "a rara avis, a comedian who does not gauge the success of his efforts by the number of laughs he induces at each performance".

== Career ==
=== Early years ===
Born into an Anglo-Irish family in Burnley, Lancashire, O'Malley sang with Jack Hylton and his orchestra in the United Kingdom from 1930 to 1935. Known at that time as Pat O'Malley, in 1930 he sang "Amy, Wonderful Amy", a song about aviator Amy Johnson, performed by Hylton's band.

At the end of 1935, Hylton and O'Malley came to the United States to record with a band composed of American musicians, thus emulating Ray Noble and Al Bowlly. The venture was short-lived. O'Malley remained in the US, known professionally as J. Pat O'Malley (to avoid confusion with another film actor named Pat O'Malley); he had a long and varied acting career, including the 1943 film Lassie Come Home as "Hynes".

=== Television career ===
O'Malley guest-starred in 1951 as a sheriff on the syndicated western series, The Adventures of Kit Carson. From 1950 to 1955, he appeared in five episodes of The Philco-Goodyear Television Playhouse. From 1951 to 1957, he was cast in eight episodes of another anthology series, Robert Montgomery Presents. Other television work from this period includes roles in Spin and Marty film (1955) and serial (1955–57) as the always-faithful ranch steward, Perkins.

In 1956, O'Malley guest-starred in "The Guilty", one of the last episodes of the NBC legal drama Justice. In 1958, he was a guest star in Peter Gunn (Season 1, Episode 3, "The Vicious Dog") as Homer Tweed.

O'Malley also appeared in the syndicated City Detective in the episode "Found in a Pawnshop" (1955). In 1960, O'Malley was cast in another syndicated series, Coronado 9. In 1959 and 1960, O'Malley portrayed a judge and a newspaper editor in three episodes of the ABC western series The Rebel about a roaming former Confederate soldier.

On January 6, 1959, O'Malley played a priest in the episode "The Secret of the Mission" on the syndicated adventure series Rescue 8.

The same year, O'Malley guest starred on the TV Western Gunsmoke as the title character "Print Asper" (S4E36).

O'Malley was cast as Walter Morgan in the 1959 episode "The First Gold Brick" of the NBC western series The Californians. In 1959-1960, he made eight appearances as Judge Caleb Marsh in Black Saddle. In 1959 he was cast as Dr Hardy in an early episode of Hennesey. In season 3, Episode 10 of the television series Wanted: Dead or Alive, "The Medicine Man", O'Malley played Doc. He also appeared in the role of a bank president in an episode of The Real McCoys titled "The Bank Loan", which was released January 15, 1959.

In 1959 and 1960, O'Malley appeared in the Disney series The Swamp Fox. In the first episode, he played a British guard at the gates to the fortifications of Charlestown. In subsequent episodes, he was listed as a co-star, playing Sgt. O'Reilly, one of Francis Marion's closest men.

In 1960, O'Malley made guest appearances on The Tab Hunter Show, The Law and Mr. Jones, Johnny Midnight, Johnny Staccato, Harrigan and Son, Adventures in Paradise, The Islanders, Going My Way, The Tall Man, and as Jim Phelan on Lawman episode titled "The Swamper." He made numerous guest appearances on CBS's Perry Mason, including as the defendant in the 1960 episode "The Case of the Prudent Prosecutor" and as the murderer in the 1961 episode "The Case of the Roving River". O'Malley also appeared in The Twilight Zone episode "The Chaser".

In 1961, O'Malley appeared in 3 episodes of Tales of Wells Fargo, in different roles. In the episode "The Has-Been" he had the title role, playing a fading entertainer grieving over the loss of his wife. In one scene, O'Malley sang and danced as he performed for an imaginary audience in an abandoned dance hall. Later that year he guest-starred in the television version of Bus Stop and the following year appeared in two episodes of The Twilight Zone, "The Fugitive" and "Mr. Garrity and the Graves". He also guest-starred twice on The Lloyd Bridges Show in that series' 1962–1963 season. He then co-starred in the 1964 episode "This Train Don't Stop Till It Gets There" of The Greatest Show on Earth.

During the 1963–1964 season O'Malley appeared in eight episodes of My Favorite Martian and returned to The Twilight Zone, playing a bit part in the episode "The Self-Improvement of Salvatore Ross". In the 1964–1965 season, he was cast in Wendy and Me. O'Malley appeared in the Hogan's Heroes episode "How to Cook a German Goose by Radar" in 1966, and the 1967 episode "D-Day at Stalag 13". In 1966, he also appeared as Ed Breck in the episode "Win Place and Die" of the sitcom Run, Buddy, Run. He appeared occasionally as Vince in The Rounders. In the 1966 episode "The Four Dollar Law Suit" of the syndicated western series Death Valley Days, O'Malley played a lawyer. In the January 19 and January 25, 1967, episodes of Batman, he played an eccentric inventor, Pat Pending, who is robbed by Catwoman.

In 1969, O'Malley portrayed Carol Brady's father in the first episode of ABC's The Brady Bunch. Also, in 1969 he played a hobo in the episode of Petticoat Junction entitled "Make Room for Baby". Season 7 episode 1. The name Fleming was used in O'Malley's first two appearances on The Fugitive (Season 1, "See Hollywood and Die"; Season 3, "Crack in a Crystal Ball"). In 1973, O'Malley co-starred in the comedy A Touch of Grace. He made several appearances on Maude between 1975 and 1977; and he performed on other series such as It Takes a Thief, One Day at a Time, Emergency!, Adam-12, The Practice, Three's Company, and Taxi. O'Malley also appeared on the ABC television series Family in 1979.

O'Malley appeared three times on the ABC television series Barney Miller. In the 1975 episode "You Dirty Rat" O'Malley played Mr. Holliman, the likeable homeless man who fell asleep and spent the weekend in Siegel's department store. In the 1981 "Rainmaker" episode, O'Malley played Walter Dooley, a traveling rainmaker hired by the NYC water department to end a drought but was arrested for setting a ritual fire in the park.

=== Voice work ===
O'Malley contributed a number of accented voice roles to The Walt Disney Company such as the Cockney costermonger in the "Supercalifragilisticexpialidocious" sequence in Mary Poppins (1964); Cyril Proudbottom in The Adventures of Ichabod and Mr. Toad (1949); and the role of Colonel Hathi and the vulture Buzzie in The Jungle Book (1967). His voice can be heard in Alice in Wonderland (1951), in which he performs all the character voices in "The Walrus and the Carpenter" segment (excepting Alice), including Tweedledum and Tweedledee, the Walrus, the Carpenter, and Mother Oyster. Actor Dick Van Dyke has said that O'Malley was his dialect coach on Mary Poppins, attributing his widely criticized Cockney accent in that film to O'Malley.

== Personal life ==
O'Malley and his wife Fay, married in 1936, they remained married until his death in 1985. They had two children.

== Death ==
O'Malley died of cardiovascular disease at his home in San Juan Capistrano on 27 February 1985, aged 80.

== Selected TV and filmography ==
Year	Title	Role	Notes
1940	Captain Caution	Fish Peddler	
1941	Private Nurse	Henry's Friend	Uncredited
1941	Paris Calling	Sergeant Bruce McAvoy	
1942	Over My Dead Body	Petie Stuyvesant	
1943	Thumbs Up	Sam Keats	
1943	Lassie Come Home	Hynes	
1944	The White Cliffs of Dover	Martin	Uncredited
1949	The Adventures of Ichabod and Mr. Toad	Cyril Proudbottom	Voice
1951	Alice in Wonderland	Tweedledum and Tweedledee / Walrus and Carpenter / Mother Oyster	Voice
1956	The Fastest Gun Alive	Cross Creek Townsman	Uncredited
1957	Four Boys and a Gun	Fight Manager	
1957	Courage of Black Beauty	Mike Green	
1957	Witness for the Prosecution	The Shorts Salesman	Uncredited
1958	The Long, Hot Summer	Ratliff	
1961	One Hundred and One Dalmatians	Jasper Badun / Colonel / Mr. Simpkins / Mechanic	Voice
1961	Blueprint for Robbery	Pop Kane	
1962	The Cabinet of Caligari	Martin	
1963	Shotgun Wedding	Buford Anchors	
1964	Hey There, It's Yogi Bear!	Snively	Voice
1964	A House Is Not a Home	Muldoon	
1964	Mary Poppins	Bloodhound / Master of Hounds / Hunting Horse #2 / Pearly Drummer / Pearly Tambourinist / Penguin Waiter / Photographer / Reporter #2	Voice, Uncredited
1964	Apache Rifles	Captain Thatcher	
1967	Gunn	Tinker	
1967	The Jungle Book	Colonel Hathi, the Elephant / Buzzie, the Vulture	Voices
1968	Star!	Dan	
1969	Hello, Dolly!	Park Policeman	
1970	The Cheyenne Social Club	Dr. Foy	
1971	Willard	Jonathan Farley	
1971	Skin Game	William	
1973	Robin Hood	Otto the Blacksmith, a dog	Voice (uncredited)
1976	The Gumball Rally	Barney Donahue	
1981	Cheaper to Keep Her	Landlord	
1981	Freedom	Papa J.	

== Television ==
Year	Title	Role	Notes
1950	Stage 13		Episode: "Midsummer's Eve"
1950-1952	Lights Out	Various	5 episodes
1950-1953	The Philco Television Playhouse	Various	5 episodes
1950-1957	Studio One	Various	3 episodes
1951	Danger		Episode: "The Corpse and Tighe O'Kane"
1951	The Nash Airflyte Theater		Episode: "The Professor's Punch"
1951	The Adventures of Kit Carson	Sheriff	Episode: "The Outlaws of Manzatania"
1951-1957	Schlitz Playhouse of Stars	Various	3 episodes
1951-1957	Robert Montgomery Presents	Various	9 episodes
1951-1957	Lux Video Theatre	Various	6 episodes
1951-1958	Kraft Theatre	Various	13 episodes
1952	Hallmark Hall of Fame	Warden	Episode: "The King's Author"
1953	Armstrong Circle Theatre		Episode: "The Marmalade Scandal"
1953	Martin Kane, Private Eye	Lieutenant Gaines	Episode: "Trip to Bermuda"
1953	The Web		Episode: "A Design for Execution"
1953-1955	Goodyear Playhouse	Various	3 episodes
1954	Suspense		Episode: "The Iron Cop"
1955	The Elgin Hour	Miller	Episode: "The Bridge"
1955	City Detective	Abel	Episode: "Found in a Pawnshop"
1955	Spin and Marty	Perkins	
1955-1957	The United States Steel Hour	Cookie/Curley	2 episodes
1956	Justice		Episode: "The Guilty"
1956	Appointment with Adventure	Leo	Episode: "Night Shadow"
1956	I Spy		Episode: "The Watchmaker of Scapa Flow"
1956	TV Reader's Digest	Ship's Captain/Bailiff	2 episodes
1956	Playwrights '56	Doc Phelps/MacLeod	2 episodes
1956	The Alcoa Hour	Augustus Dunstable	Episode: "The Confidence Men"
1956	The Adventures of Hiram Holliday	Jennings	Episode: "Wrong Rembrant"
1957-1960	Captain David Grief	Walker/Joe King	2 episodes
1958	Matinee Theater		Episode: "Found Money"
1958	Playhouse 90	Mr. Frobisher	Episode: "Bomber's Moon"
1958-1959	Maverick	Ambrose Callahan/Dr. Fred Dillon	2 episodes
1958-1960	Zane Grey Theater	Various	3 episodes
1958-1961	Peter Gunn	Various	3 episodes
1958-1973	Gunsmoke	Various	5 episodes
1959	The Californians	Walter Morgan	Episode: "The First Gold Brick"
1959	Alfred Hitchcock Presents	Colonel Binns	Episode: "The Dusty Drawer"
1959	Rescue 8	Father Flynn	Episode: "The Secret of the Mission"
1959	The Danny Thomas Show	Ed Kelly	2 episodes
1959	Union Pacific		Episode: "Ten to a Rail"
1959	Yancy Derringer	Captain Billy	Episode: "The Quick Firecracker"
1959	Whirlybirds	Dr. Barrows	Episode: "Obsession"
1959	Mickey Spillane's Mike Hammer	Hugo	Episode: "Bride and Doom"
1959	Mr. Lucky	Professor Olander	Episode: "The Money Game"
1959	Johnny Staccato	Sgt. Lou Bacus	2 episodes
1959-1960	Lawman	Owen Muldoon/Jim Phelan	2 episodes
1959-1960	Black Saddle	Judge Marsh	7 episodes
1959-1960	Law of the Plainsman	Doc Leonard/Jonas	2 episodes
1959-1960	The Rebel	Various	3 episodes
1959-1960	Have Gun – Will Travel	Marcus Goodbaby/Logan	2 episodes
1959-1963	The Real McCoys	Various	4 episodes
1959-1963	Rawhide	Various	4 episodes
1960	The Islanders	James J. Lacey	Episode: "The Generous Politician"
1960	Markham	Walter Trevor	Episode: "A Coffin for Cinderella"
1960	The Dennis O'Keefe Show	Charley Burke	Episode: "Author, Author"
1960	The Untouchables	Warden Carroll	Episode: "Portrait of a Thief"
1960	Hotel de Paree	Matt Hollis	Episode: "Vengeance for Sundance"
1960	The Detectives	Barney Melson	Episode: "The Bodyguards"
1960-1961	Perry Mason	Jefferson Pike/Seth Tyson	2 episodes
1960	Wanted Dead or Alive	Doc Farnsworth	Episode: "The Medicine Man"
1960	Johnny Midnight	Harry Hughes	Episode: "Somebody Loves You"
1960-1964	The Twilight Zone	Various	4 episodes
1961-1971	Bonanza	Various	3 episodes
1964-1968	Green Acres	Various	4 episodes
1966-1969	Petticoat Junction	Murdock Sneed/The Hobo	2 episodes
1968-1969	I Dream of Jeannie	Paw/Judge Elroy Miller	2 episodes
1969	The Beverly Hillbillies	Judge Vinegar Joe Johnson	Episode: "Drysdale and Friend"
1969	The Brady Bunch	Henry Tyler	Episode: "The Honeymoon"
1970-1971	Adam-12	Various	3 episodes
1971	Alias Smith and Jones	H.T. McDuff	Episode: "Wrong Train to Brimstone"
1972	Getting Away from It All	Jeremiah	ABC Movie of the Week
1975-1977	Maude	Bert Beasley	22 episodes
1975-1981	Barney Miller	Various	3 episodes
1979	Lou Grant	Patrick Terhune	Episode: "Scam"
1979	Young Maverick	Uncle Malachi	Episode: "A Fistul of Oats"
1979	Three's Company	Leo Moran	Episode: "Old Folks at Home"
1980	The Dukes of Hazzard	Henstep	Episode: "Return of the Ridge Raiders"
1981-1982	Fantasy Island	Reverend/Barkeep	2 episodes
1982	Taxi	Tom	Episode: "The Road Not Taken: Part 1"
