= Tormented (1960 film) =

1960 film by Bert I. Gordon

- Promotional poster
- Directed by: Bert I. Gordon
- Written by: Bert I. Gordon; George Worthing Yates
- Produced by: Bert I. Gordon; Joe Steinberg
- Starring: Richard Carlson; Juli Reding; Susan Gordon; Lugene Sanders; Joe Turkel
- Cinematography: Ernest Laszlo
- Edited by: John Bushelman
- Music by: Albert Glasser; Calvin Jackson
- Distributed by: Allied Artists Pictures Corporation
- Release date: September 22, 1960
- Running time: 75 minutes
- Country: United States
- Language: English

Tormented is a 1960 American horror film directed and produced by Bert I. Gordon for Allied Artists Pictures Corporation, and starring Richard Carlson. The film was featured in the fourth season of the television series Mystery Science Theater 3000.

== Plot ==
Tormented

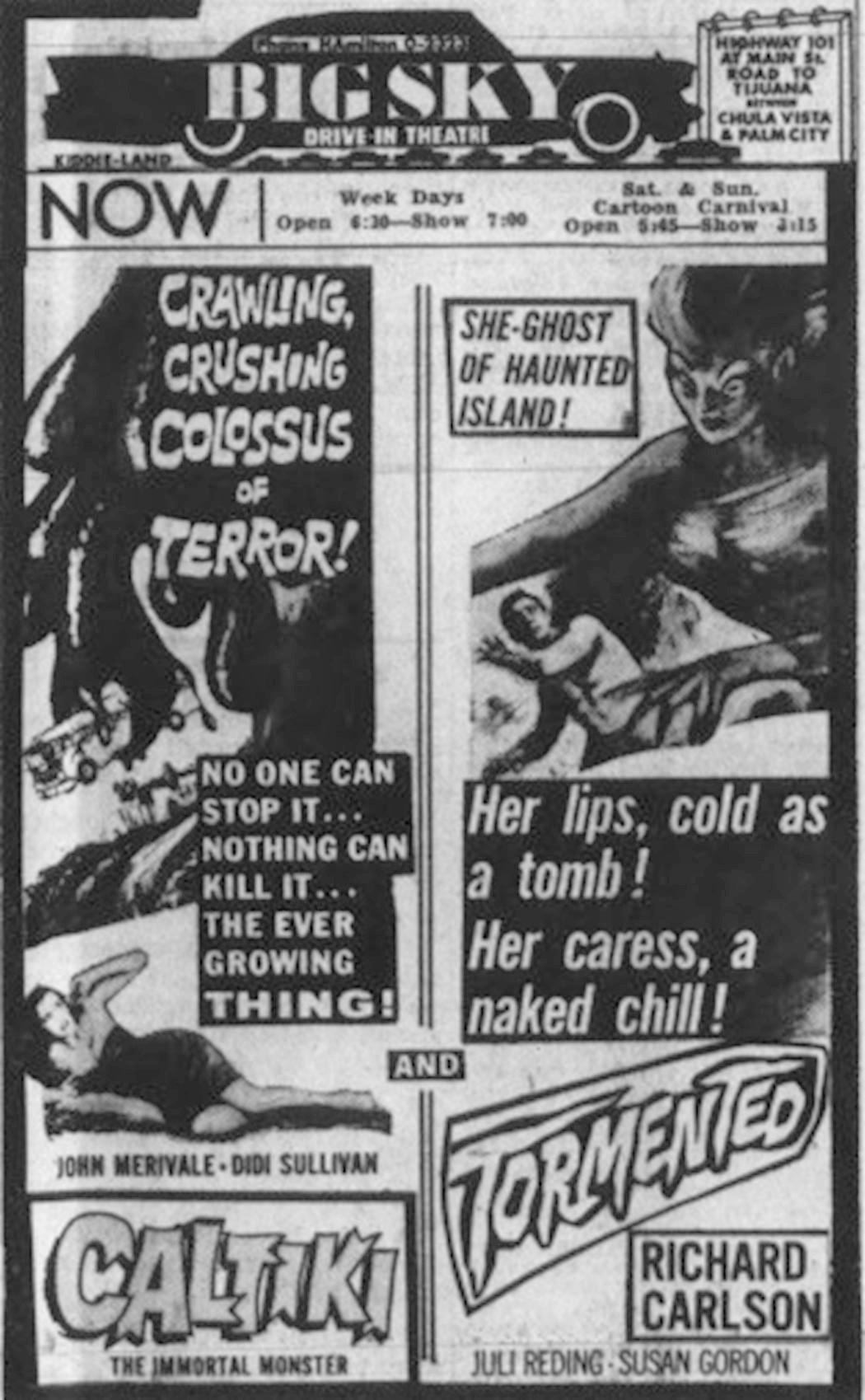
Drive-in advertisement from 1960 for Tormented and co-feature, Caltiki – The Immortal Monster.

Jazz pianist Tom Stewart lives in a Cape Cod island community and is preparing to marry his fiancée, Meg Hubbard. Shortly before the wedding, Tom's ex-girlfriend Vi Mason visits and informs him that she will end his relationship with Meg, using blackmail if necessary. While they argue atop a lighthouse, the railing gives way, and Vi falls. She manages to hang on briefly while she cries for help, but Tom refuses and watches her fall to her death.

The next day, Tom sees Vi's body floating in the water. After he retrieves her, the body dissolves into seaweed. Tom tries to forget, but over the next few days, Vi's watch washes up on the beach, strange footprints appear in the sand, Vi's ghost appears and tells Tom that she will haunt him for the rest of his life, and when Meg's little sister Sandy asks to try on the wedding ring, a disembodied hand makes off with it.

During a pre-wedding party, Vi's disembodied head appears in a photo a guest takes of the couple. Later, Vi taunts that she will use her voice to tell the world how Tom killed her. To add to his dilemma, Nick Lewis, a beatnik ferryman, comes to claim the $5 Vi owes for her passage to the island. Tom's haste to pay causes shifty Nick to stick around, and his attempts at blackmail lead to his death, which Sandy inadvertently witnesses, unknown to Tom.

Sandy, who idolizes Tom, remains silent, although she almost speaks up at the wedding when the minister asks if anyone has any objection. Before she can speak, the church's doors burst open and cause the flowers to wilt and the candle flames to be extinguished, bringing the ceremony to an abrupt, unpleasant halt.

That night, Tom returns to the lighthouse and tells Vi that he is leaving the island. When he finds Sandy eavesdropping, he realizes that he is trapped: Sandy knows too much and could tell Meg and the community. In desperation, he leads Sandy up to the broken railing with the intent to push her over. However, Vi's ghost swoops down on him, causing him to go over the edge as Sandy watches.

The islanders find Vi's body, and Tom's soon afterwards. When his body is placed next to hers, her arm somehow manages to land across him. On Vi's hand is the wedding ring, signaling that Tom is now forever with Vi.

== Cast ==
- Richard Carlson as Tom Stewart
- Susan Gordon as Sandy Hubbard
- Lugene Sanders as Meg Hubbard
- Juli Reding as Vi Mason
- Joe Turkel as Nick Lewis
- Lillian Adams as Mrs. Ellis
- Gene Roth as Mr. Nelson
- Vera Marsh as Mrs. Hubbard
- Harry Fleer as Frank Hubbard
  - Paul Frees (uncredited) as Frank's voice

== Production notes ==
Nick Lewis, the "beatnik ferryman", was played by Joe Turkel, who appeared in two other Bert I. Gordon productions: The Boy and the Pirates and Village of the Giants.

While the role of Frank Hubbard was portrayed on screen by actor Harry Fleer, his voice was dubbed by Paul Frees. This was a common occurrence in Frees' career as he was often called in to dub actors' voices during the post-production phases, always in an uncredited capacity.

== Home media ==
- Something Weird Video released the film as a download.
- The Mystery Science Theater 3000 version has been released by Rhino Home Video as part of the Collection, Volume XI box set.

== See also ==
- List of ghost films
- List of films in the public domain in the United States
- The Uninvited
