= Mission in Morocco =

1960 film

- Directed by: Carlos Arévalo
- Written by: Ken Annakin; Carlos Arévalo; Brian Clemens; Guy Elmes
- Produced by: Sergio Newman
- Starring: Lex Barker; Juli Reding; Fernando Rey
- Cinematography: Cecilio Paniagua
- Edited by: Max Benedict; Alfonso Santacana
- Music by: Guenther Kauer
- Production company: Hispamer Films
- Distributed by: Rosa Films
- Release date: 1960
- Running time: 85 minutes
- Countries: Spain; United Kingdom
- Languages: Spanish; English

Mission in Morocco (Spanish: Misión en Marruecos) is a 1960 Spanish-British thriller film directed by Carlos Arévalo and starring Lex Barker, Juli Reding and Fernando Rey. Location shooting took place around Tangier and Tetouan. The film's sets were designed by the art director Teddy Villalba. Anthony Squire directed an English-language version. It featured on American International Television in 1973.

== Synopsis ==
Bruce Reynolds, an American oil tycoon travelling to Morocco, investigates the murder of a fellow countryman of his and finds that he had in fact been working undercover as a secret agent.

== Cast ==
- Lex Barker as Bruce Reynolds
- Juli Reding as Carol Sampson
- Fernando Rey as Princ Achmed
- Silvia Morgan as Marian Palos
- Alfredo Mayo as Major Selim Naruf
- Miguel Ángel Rodríguez as Muchacho
- Miguel del Castillo as Socio del Mayor

== Bibliography ==
- Craig, Rob. American International Pictures: A Comprehensive Filmography. McFarland, 2019.
