= Max Benedict =

British film editor (1920–1986)

Max Peter Benedict
- Born: 20 February 1920; Vienna, Austria
- Died: 20 April 1986 (aged 66); London, England
- Occupation: Film editor
- Years active: 1947–1985

Max Peter Benedict (20 February 1920 – 20 April 1986) was an Austrian born, British film editor.

He was born in Vienna, Austria and began his film career working with the British Government during World War II. This led to his becoming a script researcher for director brothers Roy and John Boulting. He would later become a film editor, a translator of plays, a film critic, and a lecturer at the National Film School as well as the London International Film School.

== Selected filmography ==
- Mission in Morocco (1960)
- Whistle Down the Wind (1961)
- Guns at Batasi (1964)
- The Blue Max (1966)
- Eagle in a Cage (1972)
- Shaft in Africa (1973)
