= Herbert Hutner =

American lawyer (1908–2008)

- Born: Herbert Loeb Hutner; December 21, 1908; New York City, New York, U.S.
- Died: December 7, 2008 (aged 99); Los Angeles, California, U.S.
- Education: Columbia University (BA, LLB)
- Occupations: Private investment banker, attorney
- Spouses: Zsa Zsa Gabor (m. 1962; div. 1966) Juli Reding (m. 1969)
- Children: 2

Herbert Loeb Hutner (December 21, 1908 – December 7, 2008) was an American private investment banker, attorney and philanthropist.

== Early life ==
Hutner was born on December 21, 1908, in New York City. He graduated from Columbia University in 1928 and received a law degree from the Columbia Law School in 1931.

== Career ==
Hutner started his career on Wall Street, founding Osterman & Hutner with Lester Osterman. He then served as the Chairman of Sleight & Hellmuth Inc., Pressed Metals of America, Struthers Wells Corp. and the Platinum Mining Co. Later, he served as the President of the New England Life Insurance Co.

Hutner was chairman of the President's Advisory Committee on the Arts from 1982 to 1990, serving under Ronald Reagan and George H. W. Bush.

== Philanthropy ==
Hutner made charitable contributions to the Jules Stein Eye Institute at UCLA and the Young Musicians Foundation. Additionally, he was a co-founder of the Los Angeles Music Center.

== Personal life ==
Hutner was married three times. With his first wife, Marjorie Mayer, he had a son, Jeffrey Hutner (b. 1942), and a daughter, Lynn M. Collwell (b. 1945). His second wife was Zsa Zsa Gabor; they married on November 5, 1962. They divorced on March 3, 1966. He married his third wife Juli Reding (1936), an actress, on her 33rd birthday, November 28, 1969.

== Death ==
Hutner died at Cedars-Sinai Medical Center in Los Angeles on December 7, 2008, at age 99, two weeks shy of his 100th birthday.

Husband of a Gabor Sister
Preceded by George Sanders	Zsa Zsa - Fourth; November 5, 1962 – March 3, 1966; Divorced	Succeeded by Joshua S. Cosden Jr.
