= Lillian Adams =

American actress (1922–2011)

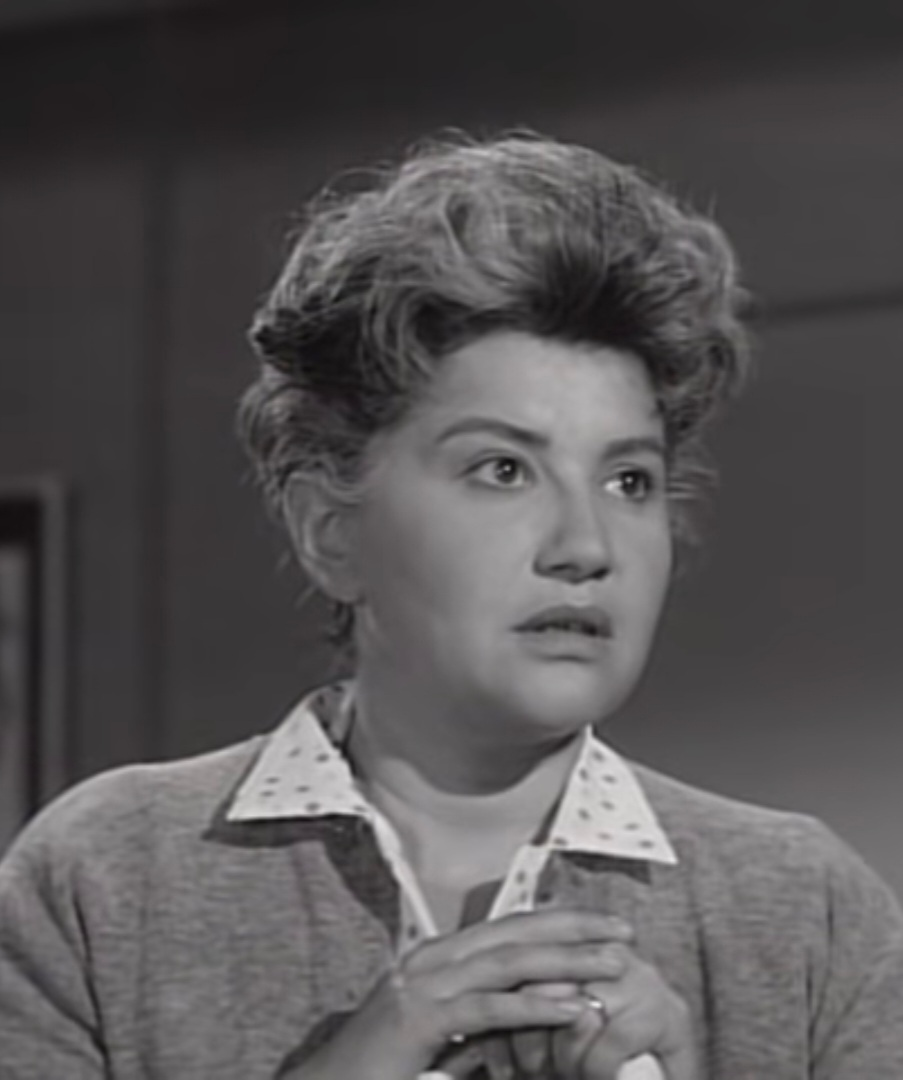
- Adams in Tormented (1960)
- Born: May 13, 1922; Chicago, Illinois, U.S.
- Died: May 25, 2011 (aged 89); Los Angeles, California, U.S.
- Occupation: Actress
- Years active: 1958–2011

Lillian Adams (May 13, 1922 – May 25, 2011) was an American actress who appeared in over 100 film and television roles.

Born in Chicago, Adams appeared in movies such as Private Benjamin and Bruce Almighty as well as television series such as Gomer Pyle: USMC, The Flying Nun, The Twilight Zone, Archie Bunker's Place, Married... with Children, NYPD Blue, Frasier, and Modern Family. Her last film project was an independent film titled At What Price.

Adams also appeared in commercials for CVS Pharmacy as the mascot Super Saver Lillian.

On May 25, 2011, Adams died of heart failure in Woodland Hills, California, aged 89.

== Selected filmography ==
- Crisis (1950) as Nurse
- Whirlybirds (1958, TV Series) as Drugstore Clerk
- The Wild and the Innocent (1959) as Kiri Hawks
- Tormented (1960) as Mrs. Ellis
- A Majority of One (1961) as Mrs. Stein
- Hemingway's Adventures of a Young Man (1962) as Indian Woman
- The Outer Limits (1963, Episode: "Nightmare") as Dix's Mother
- A Very Special Favor (1965) as Therapy Group Member
- Family Affair (1966, TV series) as Mrs. Mariani
- Enter Laughing (1967) as Theater Goer
- Dragnet 1967 (1968, TV series) as Mother Maria, Gypsy con artist
- Funny Girl (1968) as Pushcart Woman
- Ironside (1969, TV series) as Mrs. Farber
- The Comic (1969) as Old Lady
- Pate Katelin en Buenos Aires (1969)
- Adam-12 (1971, TV series) as Mrs. Fine
- Heavy Traffic (1973) as voice of Rosa
- Lepke (1975) as Mama Meyer
- Half a House (1975) as Bitsy's client
- An Enemy of the People (1978)
- Swap Meet (1979) as Woman
- The Last Word (1979) as Information Lady
- The Jerk (1979) as Tillie
- The Hunter (1980) as Blumenthal's Secretary
- Private Benjamin (1980) as Mrs. Goodman
- Archie Bunker's Place (1981, TV series) as Mrs. Plotkin
- Hey Good Lookin' (1982) as voice of Italian Woman
- Hambone and Hillie (1983) as Estelle
- Summer School (1987) as Grandma Eakian
- Out of This World (1988, TV series) as Evie
- Murphy Brown (1992, TV series) as Estelle
- Unstrung Heroes (1995) as Aunt Estelle
- Night Stand (1995-1997, TV series) as Ruthie / Pamela
- Wings (1997, TV series) as Older Lady
- Temporarily Yours (1997, TV series) as Passenger #1
- Hang Time (1997, TV series) as The Russian Woman
- Mike Hammer, Private Eye (1997, TV series) as Mrs. Dominic
- Foreign Correspondents (1999) as Sonya
- Becker (1999, TV series) as Mrs. Rowick
- Dharma & Greg (1999, TV series) as Mrs. Spinoza
- Anywhere but Here (1999) as Jack's Mother
- Magnolia (1999) as Donnie's Old Neighbor
- Attention Shoppers (2000) as Gracie
- Little Nicky (2000) as Old Lady at Game
- Dean Quixote (2000) as University Teller
- The Sweetest Thing (2002) as Aunt Frida
- Kiss the Bride (2002) as Aunt Speed
- Malcolm in the Middle (2002-2006, TV series) as Mona
- Today I Vote for My Joey (2002) as Selma
- Bruce Almighty (2003) as Mama Kowolski
- Love for Rent (2005) as Mrs. Goldfarb
- The TV Set (2006) as Audience Member #2
- It's Always Sunny in Philadelphia (2007, Episode: "The Gang Sets Sweet Dee on Fire") as Irvine Simon
- Ugly Betty (2007, TV series) as Esther
- Bar Starz (2008) as Crazy Old Lady
- The Suite Life on Deck (2008-2009, TV series) as Mrs. Pepperman
- Two and a Half Men (2009, TV series) as Mrs. Freemantle
- Tanner Hall (2009) as Victoria's Grandmother
- Modern Family (2009, Episode: "Pilot") as Passenger on Plane
- Tim and Eric's Billion Dollar Movie (2012) as Mrs. Wareheim
