= Young Love (radio series) =

American radio situation comedy series (1949–1950)

Young Love is a 30-minute American radio situation comedy that was broadcast on CBS from July 4, 1949, through May 13, 1950.

== Premise ==
Janet Shaw and James E. Lewis Jr. were secretly married students at a college that prohibited undergraduate marriages. They were wed by a justice of the peace, celebrating afterward with soft drinks and peanut-butter sandwiches at a drug store. Because of the secrecy of their relationship, James lived in a fraternity house, and Janet lived in a girls' dormitory, which added to "the usual problems of newlywed couples". The two usually saw each other on a bench beside a lake on the campus. One exception to the secrecy was Professor Mitch, a member of the college faculty who was James's best man in the wedding. Other characters heard regularly on the program were Dean Ferguson, a "crusty" administrator at Midwestern University and Molly Belle, Janet's roommate.

== Cast ==
- Janet Shaw - Janet Waldo
- Jimmy Lewis - Jimmy Lydon
- Dean Ferguson - Herb Btterfield
- Molly Belle - Shirley Mitchell
- Professor Mitch - John Hiestand

Other actors heard on the program included Jerry Hausner and Hal March. Roy Rowan was the announcer, and Wilbur Hatch led the orchestra. The Judd Conlon Choristers ("a bop-style vocal group with plenty of zip") provided music between scenes.

== Production ==
Jerry Lawrence and Bob Lee developed the concept for the series, which they also wrote, produced, and directed. Many of the situations depicted on the program came from real-life experiences of Lee and Waldo (who were married at the time of the program). Aspects of the series's campus were taken from Ohio State (Lawrence's alma mater) and Ohio Wesleyan (Lee's alma mater).

The series began as the summer replacement for Arthur Godfrey's Talent Scouts on Mondays at 8:30 p.m. Eastern Time. Initially it was sustaining; Ford Motors began sponsoring the program in November 1949. Beginning on January 7, 1950, it was moved to Saturdays at 7 p.m., E.T., replacing Yours Truly, Johnny Dollar.

== Critical response ==
A review in the trade publication Billboard summarized Young Love as "a happy blend of commercial schmaltz, slick production work, and bright scripting." The review complimented the pace of the script and the two stars' delivery, but it said, "sometimes the comedy punch lines were at odds with the story."

The trade publication Variety called the program "a particularly charming show which should provide considerable divertissement to a hot summer's evening." It complimented the performances of Lydon and Waldo and noted that Hiestand, in his role, "provides an ironic contrast" to the two stars. Lawrence and Lee also received praise for their writing, directing, and producing. The review concluded, "All departments have been filled with good taste and proper regard for timing and structure."

Media critic John Crosby wrote that the program's concept "is durable and, far as I know, original for radio." He speculated that the show was intended to provide Waldo "something to grow into" after she had portrayed the approximately 14-year-old title character in Meet Corliss Archer. However, he wrote, "She still sounds quite a lot like 14." Similarly, although at one point, the young husband on the show said, "I'm not Henry Aldrich. I've got the thoughts and emotions of a mature man," Crosby wrote, "Jimmy doesn't behave much differently from Henry Aldrich."
