= The Five Pennies =

- Directed by: Melville Shavelson
- Written by: Robert Smith; Jack Rose; Melville Shavelson
- Produced by: Jack Rose
- Starring: Danny Kaye; Barbara Bel Geddes; Louis Armstrong; Harry Guardino; Bob Crosby; Bobby Troup
- Cinematography: Daniel L. Fapp
- Edited by: Frank P. Keller
- Music by: Thorton W. Allen; Sylvia Fine; M.W. Sheafe; Leith Stevens
- Distributed by: Paramount Pictures
- Release date: June 18, 1959; (New York)
- Running time: 117 minutes
- Country: United States
- Language: English
- Box office: $3 million (est. US/ Canada rentals)

The Five Pennies is a 1959 American biographical music drama film in VistaVision and Technicolor starring Danny Kaye as jazz cornet player and bandleader Loring "Red" Nichols. Other cast members include Barbara Bel Geddes, Louis Armstrong, Harry Guardino, Bob Crosby, Bobby Troup, Susan Gordon, and Tuesday Weld. The film was directed by Melville Shavelson.

The film received four Oscar nominations: Best Musical Scoring (Leith Stevens), Best Original Song (Sylvia Fine—Danny Kaye's wife), Best Cinematography (Daniel L. Fapp), and Best Costumes (Edith Head).

The real Red Nichols recorded all of Kaye's cornet playing for the film soundtrack. The other musicians in Red's band were not asked to provide their musical contributions, and the sound of his band was supplied by session players.

== Plot summary ==
Red Nichols is a small-town cornet player who moves to New York City in the 1920s and finds work in a band led by Wil Paradise. He meets and marries singer Willia Stutsman, a.k.a. "Bobbie Meredith". Red and his friends Jimmy Dorsey, Glenn Miller, Artie Schutt and Dave Tough form their own Dixieland band called "The Five Pennies" (a play on Nichols' name, since a nickel equals five pennies). As their popularity peaks, the Nichols' young daughter Dorothy contracts polio; devastated, Nichols throws his treasured cornet into the San Francisco Bay, and the family leaves the music business, moving to the balmier climate of Los Angeles, where Nichols works in the shipyards and both parents help Dorothy work on her recovery.

As a teenager during World War II, Dorothy learns of her father's music career and persuades him to make a comeback despite the fact that his bandmates have moved on and formed their own successful groups. His first attempts to play a horn are a miserable failure. Eventually, he listens to his wife and daughter, and practice restores his skill. His old friend Tony Valani, now a huge success, gets him a gig to perform at a small club, with a group he dubs the New Five Pennies. Nichols, nervous and terrified of splitting his lip, is disappointed when he sees no other old friends in the audience. He opens the show, and after a few notes, “Won't you come home Bill Bailey?” echoes through the dark. The lights come up, and he is greeted by Louis Armstrong and his friends. Willa comes up on stage and tells him she has a surprise for him. Dorothy steps onto the dance floor without her cane and asks her father to dance. Willa sings “This little penny is to wish on...” while they do. Nichols takes his horn and plays “Glory Hallelujah!” as his friends join in.

== Cast ==
- Danny Kaye as Red Nichols
- Barbara Bel Geddes as Willa Stutsman (her singing voice is dubbed by Eileen Wilson)
- Louis Armstrong as himself
- Harry Guardino as Tony Valani
- Bob Crosby as Will Paradise
- Bobby Troup as Arthur Schutt
- Susan Gordon as Dorothy Nichols - Ages 6 to 8
- Tuesday Weld as Dorothy Nichols - Age 13 to 14
- Ray Anthony as Jimmy Dorsey
- Shelly Manne as Dave Tough
- Ray Daley as Glenn Miller
- Valerie Allen as Tommye Eden
- Bob Hope as himself (cameo)

== Music ==
Eleven composers are credited in the film.

== Reception ==
New York Times critic A.H. Weiler wrote that the "solicitous dramatization of the harried life and times of that noted jazz man, Loring (Red) Nichols, the tune-filled story... is highly palatable schmaltz served up with a Dixieland beat by some authentic performers, musical and otherwise." He found Kaye's performance particularly fine on many levels.

== See also ==
- List of American films of 1959
