= Ann Baker =

American actress (1930–2017)

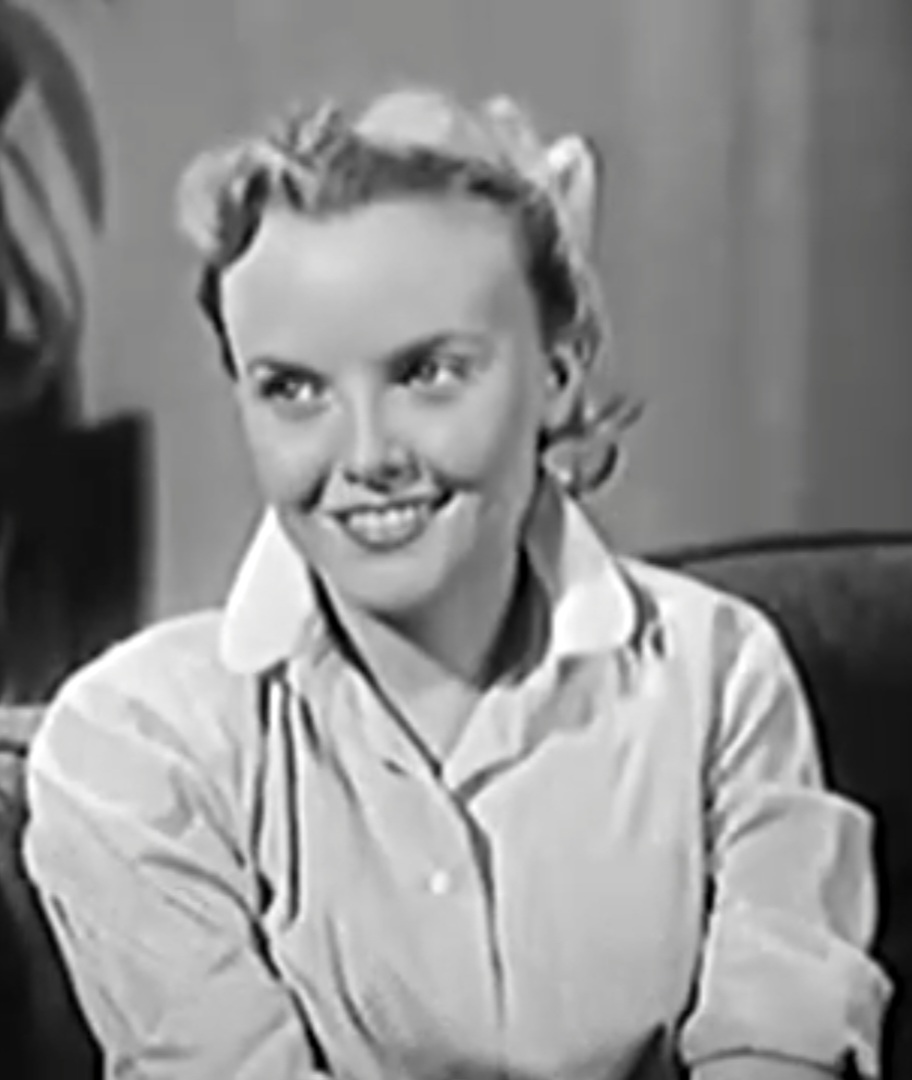
- Baker as Corliss Archer in Meet Corliss Archer, 1955
- Born: Anna Rose Baker; July 23, 1930; Sedalia, Missouri, U.S.
- Died: March 2, 2017 (aged 86); Torrance, California, U.S.
- Occupation: Actress
- Years active: 1947–1959
- Spouse: Earl Long

Anna Rose Baker (July 23, 1930 – March 2, 2017) was an American actress, known for her appearance in classic films and television shows during the 1950s.

== Early years ==
Born Anna Rose Baker, Baker was the daughter of Mr. and Mrs. George Baker, one of 11 children. She was graduated from Smith-Cotton High School in Sedalia in 1948.

== Career ==
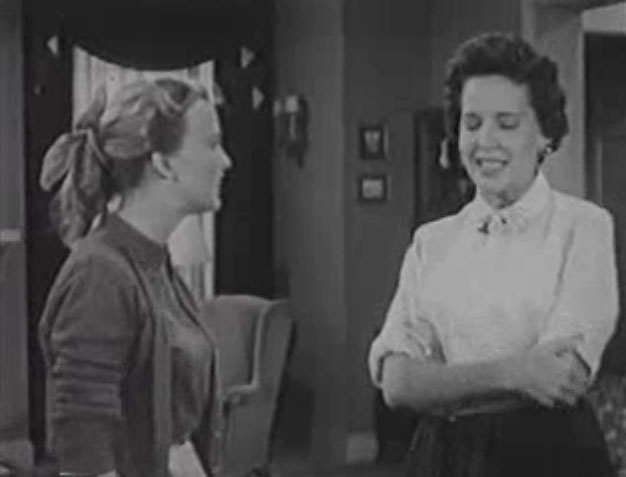
Ann Baker and Mary Brian in the Meet Corliss Archer episode "Corliss the Cheerleader"

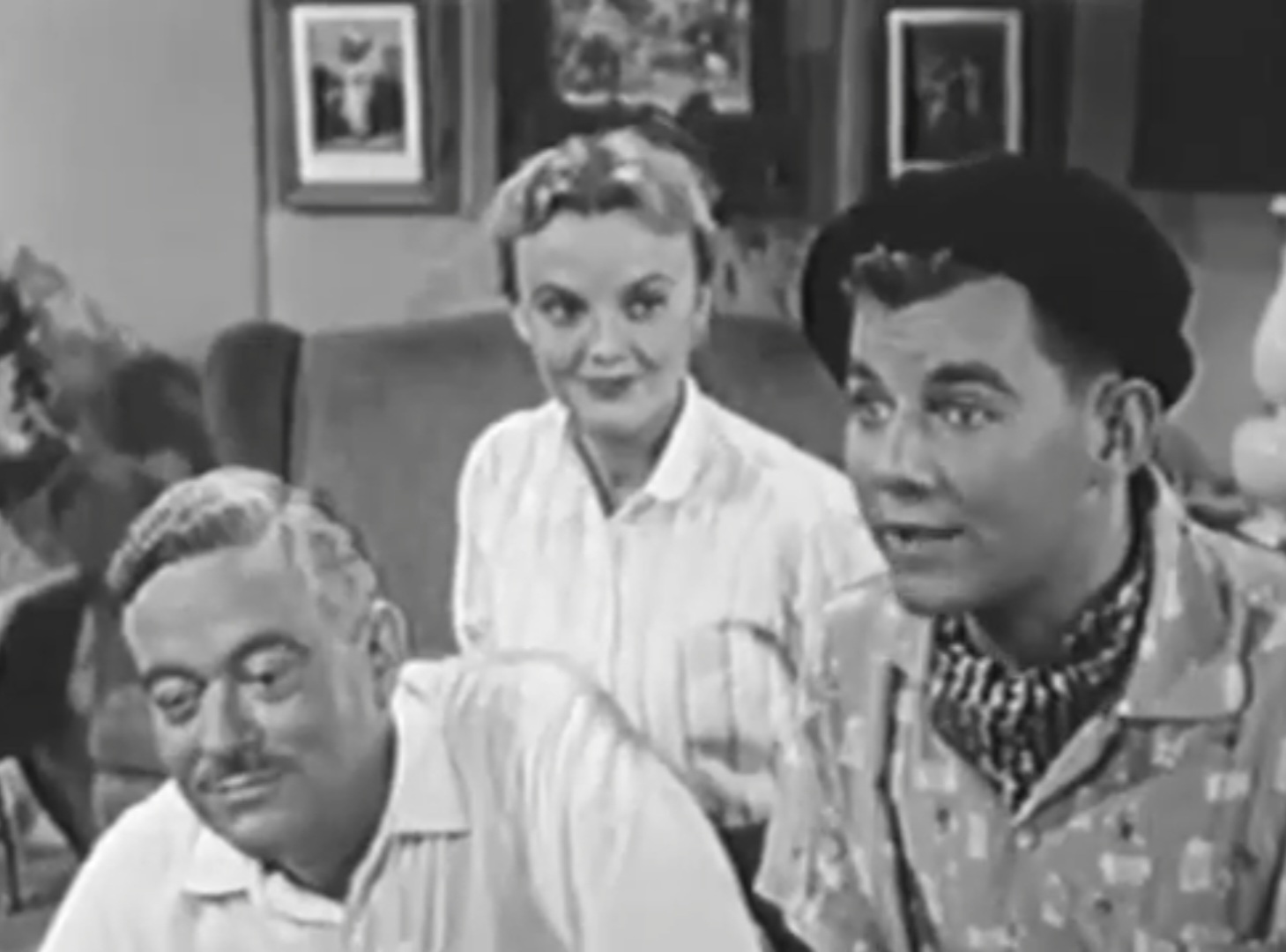
John Eldredge with Ann Baker and Robert Ellis in Meet Corliss Archer, 1955

While she was a high school student, Baker worked as a model for Mademoiselle, Junior Bazaar, Thomassetti Shoes, and M. K. T. Railroad. Moving to California increased her opportunities for modeling, and by July 1954, her image had been seen on "100 or more magazine covers, billboards and the like".

Baker appeared in eight films and television programs between 1947 and 1959. Her film appearances include Men of the Fighting Lady (1954 - uncredited), playing Mary, and Seven Brides for Seven Brothers (1954 - uncredited), as a town girl.

Her television credits included Meet Corliss Archer (1954), playing the title character; Crossroads (1955), as Gloria Vaughn; Queen for a Day (1956); Casey Jones (1957), as Jeannie; Man with a Camera (1959), playing Bunny Hansen; and The Millionaire (1959), as Shirley. Her acting career ended in 1959.

By 1957, Baker felt that she was "caught in a teen-age trap" caused by her youthful appearance. Although she was married and in her 20s, people still viewed her as teenaged Corliss Archer. "My looks are against me for the more mature roles," she said.

== Personal life ==
Baker married Earl Long, who worked in construction. She kept the marriage secret from her studio for a year. Baker died on March 2, 2017, at the age of 86.
