= Meet Corliss Archer =

American radio program (1943–1956)

Al Feldstein was one of the illustrators of the Meet Corliss Archer comic book. Note film strips and radio microphones indicating the tie-ins and media crossovers.

Meet Corliss Archer is an American radio program from radio's Golden Age that ran from January 7, 1943, to September 30, 1956. Although it was CBS's answer to NBC's A Date with Judy, it was also broadcast by NBC in 1948 as a summer replacement for The Bob Hope Show. From October 3, 1952, to June 26, 1953, it aired on ABC, finally returning to CBS. Despite the program's long run, fewer than 24 episodes are known to exist.

== Origins ==
It was based on a series of short stories introduced in 1943, in Good Housekeeping magazine. by F. Hugh Herbert. The story cycle was also adapted to theatre, as Kiss and Tell. Herbert based some content of the show on activities of his teenage daughter.

== Characters and story ==
Priscilla Lyon and Janet Waldo successively portrayed 15-year-old Corliss on radio. Lugene Sanders also played Corliss briefly on radio and in the CBS version of the Meet Corliss Archer television show.

Corliss's father Harry Archer is a lawyer who tolerates Dexter only when he wants to use him to help flaunt male superiority. Gruff but gentle, he was played by Bob Bailey and Fred Shields. Mrs. Archer was portrayed by Irene Tedrow.

== Production ==
In 1949, Meet Corliss Archer was broadcast for 10 weeks as a summer replacement for Electric Theatre. It was heard on Sundays at 9 p.m. Eastern Time. Glenhall Taylor was the producer, Tom McAvity was the director, and John Hiestand was the announcer. Jazz bandleader Lud Gluskin was one of the music directors/composers. Wilbur Hatch, Felix Mills, and Charles "Bud" Dant also worked on the show's music.

== Critical response ==
The trade publication Billboard called the September 2, 1951, episode "entertaining and slickly paced". It said that the plot was good overall, although the script "punched a bit too hard at times for gag laughs."

== Comics ==
Radio listeners had to use their imaginations to visualize Corliss, her friends and her town. But those imaginations got a boost in 1948 when the Meet Corliss Archer comic book, published by Fox Feature Syndicate, came out in three issues from March to July 1948. Film strips and radio microphones on the front cover indicated the tie-ins and media crossovers. Janet Waldo was depicted on the front cover twice, as herself and as Corliss. Al Feldstein (Albert B. Feldstein), later the editor of Mad, was a key writer and illustrator of this short-lived comic book series, which is now remembered primarily for his artwork in general and the good girl art covers in particular.

The Meet Corliss Archer comic books are mentioned, in text, p. 39, of Seduction of the Innocent, with the indication, Adolescent boys call these headlight comics.

== Film ==
Shirley Temple starred in the film adaptations, Kiss and Tell, in 1945, and A Kiss for Corliss, in 1949, her last film.

== Television ==
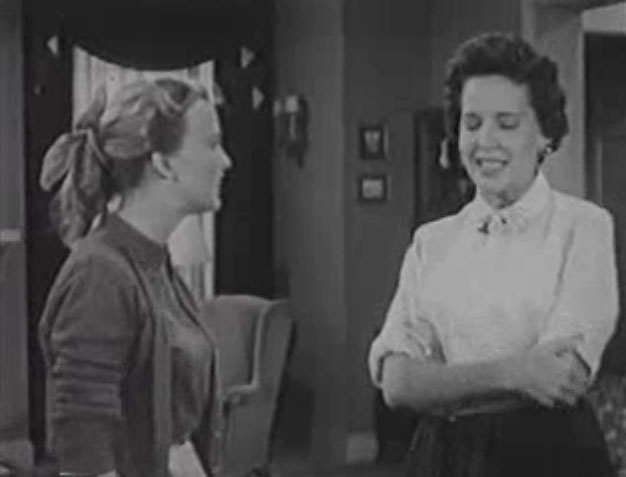
Ann Baker and Mary Brian in the TV series

Herbert's Meet Corliss Archer property was adapted to television in 1951 and 1952 with live broadcasts produced and aired by CBS. In 1954 and 1955 Ziv Television Programs produced a syndicated telefilm series starring Ann Baker, Robert Ellis, and Mary Brian. One of the show's unique features was the occasional cut to a comic-book-style drawing, with announcer's commentary, that illustrated the current story situation and was used several times during each episode. The program was produced by Ziv Productions. Several episodes of the Ziv version are available on DVD, and some are also available from the Internet Archive.

Robin Morgan portrayed Corliss in a live telecast of Kiss and Tell on The Alcoa Hour (August 5, 1956), with Warren Berlinger as Dexter.

== Sources ==
- Baker, Ernie (2000). A 50-Year Adventure in the Advertising Business – via Google Books.
- Meet Corliss Archer at the Grand Comics Database
