= Kimberly Quinn (journalist) =

American journalist

- Born: Kimberly Solomon; 1961 (age 64–65); Los Angeles, California, U.S.
- Education: Vassar College
- Occupations: Journalist; political commentator; magazine publisher and writer
- Spouses: Michael Fortier (m. 1987; div. 2000) Stephen Quinn (m. 2001)
- Children: 2
- Parent(s): Lugene Sanders; Marvin Solomon

Kimberly Quinn (formerly Fortier; née Solomon; born 1961) is an American journalist, commentator and magazine publisher and writer; latterly the publisher of British conservative news magazine The Spectator.

== Early life ==
A native of Los Angeles, California, Quinn is one of two daughters of businessman Marvin Solomon and actress Lugene Sanders. She is of Jewish heritage. She majored in Victorian Studies at Vassar College.

== Professional career ==
Quinn has written for The Wall Street Journal, Vogue and UK newspapers The Daily Telegraph, The Times, Evening Standard, and The Independent. She was the Communications and marketing director for Condé Nast Publications in the UK. She took her position at The Spectator in 1996. On 24 November 2006, Kimberly Quinn resigned from her post at The Spectator.

She has written a series of time travel adventures for young adults; the Chronicles of the Tempus series. The first work, The Queen Must Die (2010) was followed by The Queen at War (2013).

== Personal life ==
In 1987, Quinn married American investment banker Michael Fortier; the couple divorced in 2000, following revelations of her affair with Stephen Quinn, publisher of Vogue and GQ magazines. In 2001, she married Quinn; during this marriage, she had an affair with David Blunkett, Home Secretary in Tony Blair's ministry. Quinn's three-year affair with David Blunkett ended acrimoniously in mid-2004. The affair was finally revealed in full in the R v Brooks, Coulson and six others trial in October 2013, part of the News International phone hacking scandal. Police had found 330 illegally intercepted voicemail messages between Blunkett and Quinn in the safe of the News of the World's lawyer.

During that period, Quinn gave birth to one son and became pregnant with a second child. The paternity of the two children became a matter of dispute. Blunkett's paternity of Quinn's elder child, William, was confirmed by DNA tests. Following the end of the affair between Quinn and Blunkett, moves by him to gain informal access to the first child were rejected by Quinn, and in early December 2004 Blunkett petitioned the Family Division of the High Court to grant him legal access. Controversy around a number of matters arising from the affair, particularly concerns over the handling of the visa of Quinn's nanny, contributed to Blunkett's resignation in mid-December 2004. Shortly after Blunkett's resignation, it was revealed by the News of the World that Quinn had also had an affair with Simon Hoggart, a political journalist and regular contributor to The Spectator.

In February 2005, Quinn gave birth to a second son, Lorcan Quinn. A month later, Blunkett announced that DNA tests had revealed he was not the father of Quinn's second child. Blunkett has said that Quinn's elder son attended a Jewish nursery.
