= Susan Gordon =

American child actress (1949–2011)

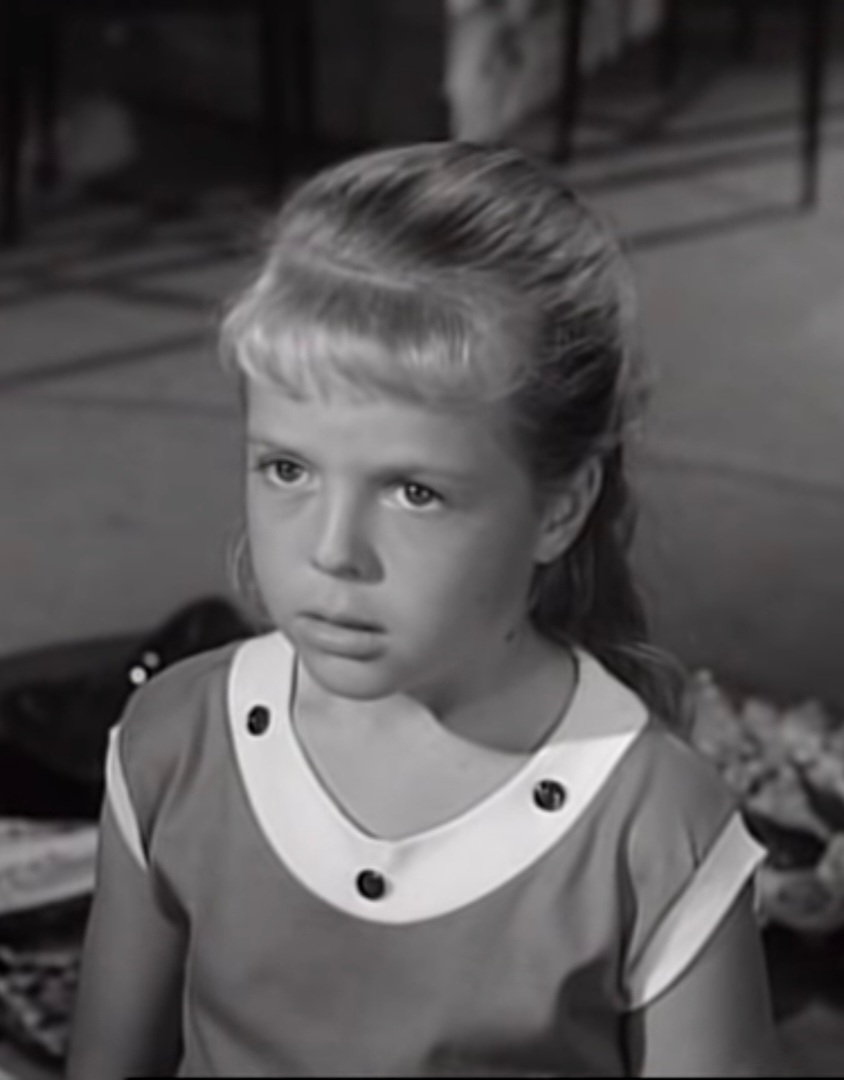
- Gordon in Tormented (1960)
- Born: July 27, 1949; Saint Paul, Minnesota, U.S.
- Died: December 11, 2011 (aged 62); Teaneck, New Jersey, U.S.
- Occupation: Actress
- Years active: 1958–1992; 2002–2011
- Known for: The Five Pennies; Picture Mommy Dead; The Fugitive
- Spouse: Avraham Aviner (m. 1977)
- Children: 6
- Father: Bert I. Gordon

Susan Gordon (July 27, 1949 – December 11, 2011) was an American actress who appeared in films and numerous episodes of television programs such as The Twilight Zone, My Three Sons, and The Donna Reed Show.

== Life and career ==
Gordon was born in Saint Paul, Minnesota, of Russian-Jewish descent the daughter of film director Bert I. Gordon and his wife, Flora (Lang) Gordon. She began her career, at age eight, as a last-minute substitute for another young actress in 1958's Attack of the Puppet People, directed by her father, who subsequently directed her in three additional films — The Boy and the Pirates, Tormented (both 1960) and 1966's Picture Mommy Dead, her final film. In 1959, she acted and sang in the semi-biographical film, The Five Pennies, playing the daughter of musician, composer and bandleader Red Nichols, portrayed by Danny Kaye.

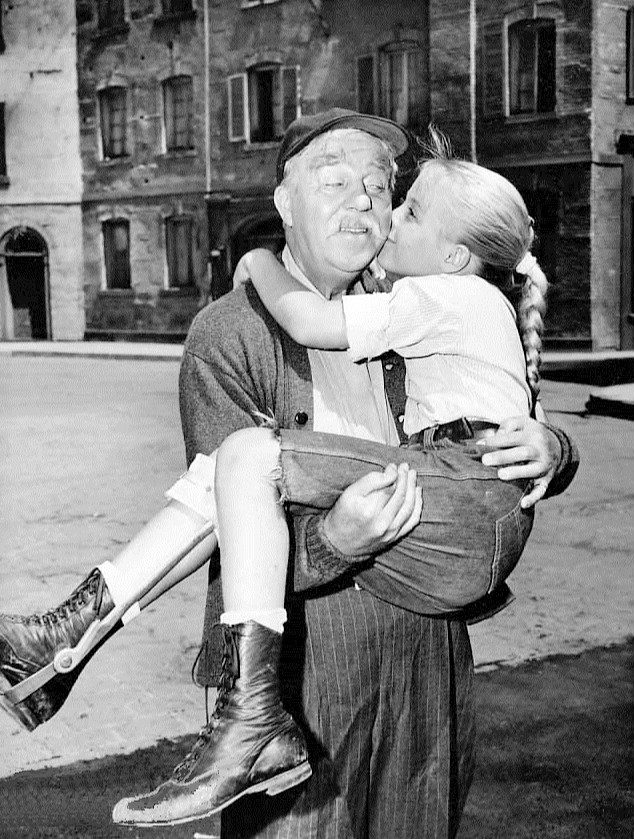
J. Pat O'Malley and Susan Gordon in "The Fugitive", a 1962 episode of The Twilight Zone

On television, Gordon appeared in The Twilight Zone episode "The Fugitive", as Jenny, a child with a leg brace who befriends an alien. Other series included Gunsmoke (1961 Episode “Little Girl” – S6E28), Alfred Hitchcock Presents, My Three Sons, The Danny Thomas Show, Route 66, Ben Casey, 77 Sunset Strip and The Donna Reed Show. On November 27, 1959, Gordon appeared in the live NBC Television broadcast of Miracle on 34th Street.

After retirement, Ms. Gordon appeared in 2002 A Magic Place in a New Time. Previous to that, she was an understudy for the long-running hit Nunsense.

== Death ==
She was a resident of the New Jersey township of Teaneck, where she had settled after returning to her Jewish roots and marrying Avi Aviner, who had been a leader of the Jewish community in Tokyo. She died on December 11, 2011, of thyroid cancer, aged 62. She was buried in Kedumim, an Israeli settlement. While married, she was thus known as Susan Aviner.

== Selected filmography ==
- Attack of the Puppet People (1958)
- The Five Pennies (1959)
- Tormented (1960)
- The Boy and the Pirates (1960)
- Alfred Hitchcock Presents (1961) (Season 6 Episode 15: "Summer Shade") as Kate 'Katie' Kendall
- The Alfred Hitchcock Hour (1963) (Season 1 Episode 20: "The Paragon") as Betty Fletcher
- Picture Mommy Dead (1966)
