= Robert Ellis (actor, born 1933) =

American child actor (1933–1973)

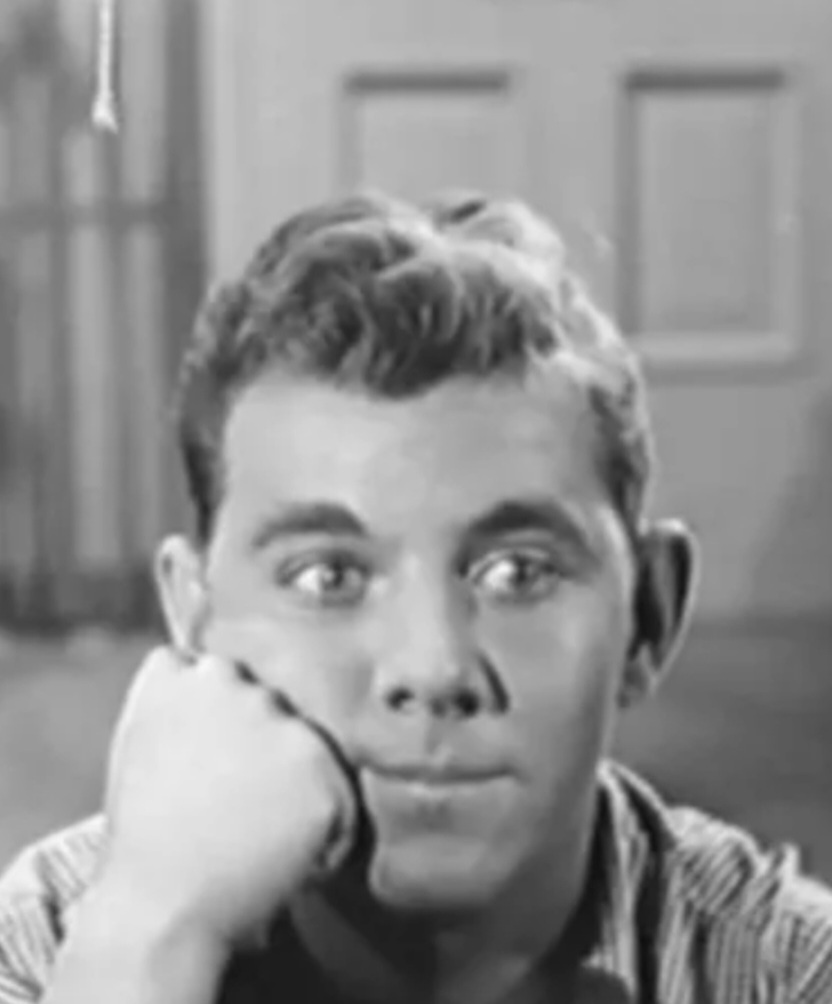
- Ellis in Meet Corliss Archer, 1954
- Born: August 24, 1933; Chicago, Illinois, U.S.
- Died: November 23, 1973 (aged 40); Los Angeles, California, U.S.
- Occupation: Actor
- Years active: 1939–1973
- Spouse(s): Aloha Wilkerson (m. 1960; div. 19??)

Robert Ellis (August 24, 1933 – November 23, 1973) was an American film and television actor in the 1940s and 1950s, who was the last actor to play Henry Aldrich on the radio series The Aldrich Family.

== Early life ==
Ellis was born in Chicago, Illinois, to Fern Bloomfield. He was educated in professional children's schools in New York City and Hollywood and later studied theater arts at Columbia University.

== Career ==
He made his acting debut at age 5 and appeared in some 50 movies and television shows, sometimes billed as "Bobby Ellis." In 1948, the Academy of Motion Pictures Arts and Sciences awarded him a special certificate for his acting and dancing role as Buster Tyme in the movie April Showers, which starred Ann Sothern and Jack Carson. He portrayed Ralph Grainger, a college friend of Ronnie Burns, on the final two seasons of The George Burns and Gracie Allen Show. He also appeared as Dexter Franklin in the Ziv Television production of Meet Corliss Archer.

He died of kidney failure at the age of 40 in Los Angeles. At the time of his death, he was a producer of educational films.

== Filmography ==
- April Showers (1948) as Buster Tyme
- The Babe Ruth Story (1948) as George Herman Ruth as a Boy
- Mexican Hayride (1948) as Mexican Boy (uncredited)
- The Green Promise (1949) as Buzz Wexford
- El Paso (1949) as Jack Elkins
- Easy Living (1949) as Urchin
- A Kiss for Corliss (1949) as Raymond Pringle
- Walk Softly, Stranger (1950) as Skating Boy
- Call Me Mister (1951) as Ack-Ack Ackerman
- The Guest (1951) film short
- Retreat, Hell! (1952) as Shorty Devine
- Peter Pan (1953) as Cubby (lost boy) (voice, uncredited)
- Niagara (1953) as Young Man (uncredited)
- Prisoner of War (1954) as Alan H. Rolfe (uncredited)
- The Long Gray Line (1955) as Cadet Short (uncredited)
- The McConnell Story (1955) as Bob Brown
- Tea and Sympathy (1956) as Second Boy (uncredited)
- Pillars of the Sky (1956) as Albie
- Space Master X-7 (1958) as Private Joe Rattigan
- Gidget (1959) as Hot Shot
- Don't Give Up the Ship (1959) as Sailor (uncredited)
- Wake Me When It's Over (1960) as Corporal (uncredited)

== Television roles ==
- The Aldrich Family (1952-1953) as Henry Aldrich
- Meet Corliss Archer (1951 & 1954–1955) as Dexter Franklin
- I Love Lucy (1952) as Tommy the Office Boy
- Fireside Theatre (1951-1952)
- Big Town (1952)
- Where's Raymond? (1954)
- Schlitz Playhouse (1954)
- The Loretta Young Show (1954) as Tom
- Public Defender (1954) as Johnny Wagner
- The Lone Ranger (1955) as Jack 'Kid' Hall
- Cavalcade of America (1955)
- Meet Corliss Archer (1954-1955) as Dexter Franklin
- The Bob Cummings Show (1956) as Joe Depew
- Telephone Time (1956)
- Lux Video Theatre (1956)
- The Adventures of Jim Bowie (1956) as Pat Jordan
- The Joseph Cotten Show: On Trial (1956) as George Barnett
- The Life and Legend of Wyatt Earp (1957) as Private Crenshaw
- Jane Wyman Presents The Fireside Theatre (1957)
- Navy Log (1957) as Kupper
- The Sheriff of Cochise (1957) as Jaekel
- Alfred Hitchcock Presents (1957) (Season 2 Episode 17: "My Brother, Richard") as Tommy Kopeck
- Alfred Hitchcock Presents (1957) (Season 2 Episode 31: "The Night the World Ended") as Reporter
- Code 3 (1957) as Dewey Cushmnan / Fred Bacon
- General Electric Theater (1957)
- The George Burns and Gracie Allen Show (1956-1958) series regular
- Flight (1958)
- 77 Sunset Strip (1958) as Harry Warren
- Death Valley Days (1959) as Ben (in "Wheelbarrow Johnny")
- The Real McCoys (1959) as Gas Station Customer
- The Donna Reed Show (1959) as Young Man (in "The Punishment")
- M Squad (1960) as Tom Herrick (in "Dead Parrots Don't Talk")
- Tallahassee 7000 (1961)
- The Jackie Gleason Special (1973)
