= Corliss Archer =

Fictional teenage girl Corliss Archer is the lead character in a series of American short stories written by F. Hugh Herbert starting in 1943. She also appears in these derivative works:

- Meet Corliss Archer, radio series 1943–1956
- Meet Corliss Archer (TV series), 1952–1953
- Kiss and Tell (play), 1943
- Kiss and Tell (1945 film) based on the play
- A Kiss for Corliss, 1949 sequel film
- Meet Corliss Archer (comic book), 1948
