= For Love or Money (play) =

Play by F. Hugh Herbert

- Original language: English
- Written by: F. Hugh Herbert
- Subject: Romantic quadrilateral
- Genre: Comedy
- Setting: Drawing room of a home in Port Washington, New York

Premiere
- Date: November 4, 1947
- Place: Henry Miller's Theatre
- Directed by: Harry Ellerbe

For Love or Money is a play written by F. Hugh Herbert. It is a comedy with three acts, six scenes, one setting, and nine characters. The action of the play spans eight days in December 1946. The story concerns a widowed stage star who must choose between a young stranger and an old love, and must also contend with a young rival. The title comes from advice offered in the play, that a woman might give herself to a man for love or money, but should never do so out of compassion.

Barnard Straus produced the play, which was staged by Harry Ellerbe, with settings by Raymond Sovey and costumes by Anna Hill Johnstone. The leads were John Loder, June Lockhart, Vicki Cummings, and Mark O'Daniels. The play had tryouts in New Haven and Boston during October 1947 then made its Broadway premiere in November 1947. Critics dismissed it as poorly written, but it proved popular with audiences, running through June 1948 for 263 performances, propelled by June Lockhart's characterization.

The story was adapted for an episode of The Philco Television Playhouse in July 1949, and by Blake Edwards for the film This Happy Feeling in 1958.

== Characters ==
Characters are listed in order of appearance within their scope.

Leads

- Nita Havermeyer is 37, Mitchell's current co-star and mistress, who wants some "social security".
- Bill Tremaine is 23, Mitchell's godson, a discharged veteran, who lives with his parents nearby.
- Preston Mitchell is 45, a stage star whose recently deceased wife had been an invalid for nine years. (Note: She had been crippled in an accident while running away with her lover.)
- Janet Blake is 22, from Jackson Heights, a dental assistant plagued by two-legged wolves

Supporting

- Mrs. Tremaine is Bill's mother.
- Mr. Tremaine is Bill's father.

Featured

- Mrs. Early is Preston's housekeeper, who is surprised that a female visitor prefers the guest bedroom.
- Queenie (Note: This character isn't mentioned in any reviews and does not always appear on cast lists.)
- Wilbur is Preston's hired hand, whose conversation consists mainly of "Yup".

Off stage

- Dr. McCafferty is Janet's lecherous employer.

== Synopsis ==
This synopsis is compiled from contemporary newspaper reviews. The setting is the drawing room of Preston Mitchell's home at Port Washington, New York, during December 1946.

The Tremaines and Nita Havermeyer are gathered with Preston Mitchell in his drawing room. The former express condolences for his recent bereavement, while the latter presses Mitchell to return to their current production, and, covertly, to legitimize their personal relationship. He assures the Tremaines there is nothing he needs or wants, except solitude. They and Nita depart, with Bill the last to leave; as he does, a heavy rain begins. Soon a frantic knocking at his door convinces Mitchell it must be Nita returning to resume her campaign. When he answers the door, an unfamiliar and bedraggled young lady demands shelter. She is Janet Blake, whose employer became overly amorous at a party in Great Neck, causing her to run out onto the country highway. There, a young man offered her a lift, but he too became fresh. She ran from his car through the rain to the nearest shelter, Mitchell's home.

Janet is a modern young woman, who knows all the cinema stars but has never heard of Mitchell. After hearing her story, he offers her a job as his secretary, so she won't have to return to Dr. McCafferty. Mrs. Early and Wilbur assume she is the newest paramour, but Mitchell behaves correctly, charming Janet with his continental style. Eventually Bill becomes a rival for Janet, while Nita tries to woo Mitchell with their profitable association in the theater and shared memories. Mitchell realizes he is falling for Janet, but expects it is a hopeless contest with the younger man. However, Janet surprises everyone by choosing Mitchell in the end.

== Original production ==
=== Background ===
At the time F. Hugh Herbert wrote For Love or Money he was living in Los Angeles and was secretary of the Screen Writers Guild. He had previously written three other plays for Broadway, of which Kiss and Tell was a major success, considerably helped by being produced and directed by George Abbott.

Producer Barnard Sachs Straus was a son of Nathan Straus Jr., and a 1941 graduate of Harvard. This was to be his second Broadway production; the first Temper the Wind had a brief run the previous year. He hired the same scenic and costume designers, Raymond Sovey and Anna Hill Johnstone from that earlier show, but employed a new director, Harry Ellerbe, a former actor.

=== Cast ===
Cast for the New Haven and Boston tryouts and during the Broadway run.
Role	Actor	Dates	Notes and sources
Nita Havermayer	Vicki Cummings	Oct 16, 1947 - Jun 19, 1948	
Bill Tremaine	Mark O'Daniels	Oct 16, 1947 - Jun 19, 1948	By Equity rules, his stage name was changed from Mark Daniels (real name Stanley Honiss) due to a prior claimant.
Preston Mitchell	John Loder	Oct 16, 1947 - Jun 16, 1948	
Preston Mitchell	Conrad Nagel	Jun 17, 1948 - Jun 19, 1948	Nagel took over just before leading the tour to Chicago.
Janet Blake	June Lockhart	Oct 16, 1947 - May 29, 1948	Lockhart left for Hollywood to make a film for Walter Wanger.
Janet Blake	Diana Herbert	May 31, 1948 - Jun 19, 1948	She was 19 and a UCLA sophomore at the time, a daughter of playwright F. Hugh Herbert.
Mrs. Tremaine	Paula Trueman	Oct 16, 1947 - Jun 19, 1948	
Mr. Tremaine	Kirk Brown	Oct 16, 1947 - May 15, 1948	
Mr. Tremaine	Hal Conklin	May 17, 1948 - Jun 19, 1948	
Mrs. Early	Maida Reade	Oct 16, 1947 - Jun 19, 1948	
Queenie	Elizabeth Brew	Oct 16, 1947 - Jun 19, 1948	
Wilbur	Grover Burgess	Oct 16, 1947 - Jun 19, 1948	

=== Tryouts ===
For Love or Money had its first tryout at the Shubert Theatre in New Haven, Connecticut, on October 16, 1947. This was a three day stay. The anonymous reviewer for the Hartford Courant called it a "turkey" and said the storyline was "preposterous bunk". Fred H. Russell in the Connecticut Post said the play had many faults, particularly a slow start and later scenes that lagged. He praised June Lockhart and Vicki Cummings for effective performances, but thought John Loder had trouble remembering his lines.

Following New Haven, the production opened for a two-week tryout at the Wilbur Theatre in Boston, on October 20, 1947. Vicki Cummings considered the Wilbur Theatre a "jinx house", having been with three previous plays that failed there in tryout. John Loder helped her reconcile with the venue by trading dressing rooms to break the jinx. Loder himself had trouble with the Boston censors, who insisted several dozen "damns" be dropped from his lines thirty minutes before the opening curtain. Cyrus Durgin in The Boston Globe judged the play to be good light entertainment, if spread a bit thin. He noted playwright Herbert's tendency to mock actors for performing off-stage as well as on, and saluted the cast for carrying off a lightweight story. Durgin also advised director Harry Ellerbe to put some more animation into the play's slow action.

=== Broadway premiere and reception ===
The production had its Broadway premiere at Henry Miller's Theatre on November 4, 1947. Arthur Pollock said "what is meant to be brisk and light turns out long and heavy". He thought June Lockhart made the most of the best part in the play, "but the comedy dances on clumsy feet". John Chapman said John Loder, June Lockhart, and Vicki Cummings carried their parts well, but the play itself "not quite sufficiently amusing". He also praised Raymond Sovey's evocation of a Long Island home, "for where else could a play like this be set?" Brooks Atkinson said F. Hugh Herbert had been studying too many bad movies in Hollywood, and had cobbled together a set of stock situations into a mechanical framework. He felt June Lockhart was the "only fresh idea in the evening", and urged Broadway to keep her from returning to Hollywood. George Jean Nathan said For Love or Money was a "rubbishy affair" but as an older man admitted a vicarious enjoyment of its May–December romance, a stage delusion which he traced back to J. M. Barrie's The Professor's Love Story. He recommended that before concocting any more such "moonshine", playwrights like Herbert should consult The Mermaids Singing by John Van Druten.

=== Closing ===
For Love or Money closed at Henry Miller's Theatre on June 19, 1948, after 263 performances, the length of the run being attributed by the Daily News to June Lockhart's performance. It immediately went on tour to Chicago, opening at the Selwyn Theatre there on June 22, 1948. Claudia Cassidy said playwright F. Hugh Herbert had blended three plays into one, and that Conrad Nagel was good in all of them. She also praised Grover Burgess as Wilbur, and was sympathetic to Diana Herbert having to fill June Lockhart's role.

== Adaptations ==
=== Television ===
- The Philco Television Playhouse: "For Love or Money" (S1E38 July 10, 1949). The one-hour teleplay was adapted by Ethel Frank, and starred William Post, Jr and Diana Herbert.

=== Film ===
- This Happy Feeling (1958) Directed by Blake Edwards, who also adapted the screen play. It relocated the story to Connecticut, and had a Hollywood ending with the four lovers paired off by age.
