= Nancy (TV series) =

- Nancy title card
- Genre: Sitcom
- Created by: Sidney Sheldon
- Written by: Sidney Sheldon (as "Christopher Golato," "Mark Rowane," and "Allan Devon'")
- Directed by: Jerome Courtland; Claudio Guzmán; Alan Rafkin; E. W. Swackhamer; Allen Baron; Herb Wallerstein
- Starring: Renne Jarrett; John Fink; Robert F. Simon; Celeste Holm
- Composer: Sid Ramin
- Country of origin: United States
- Original language: English
- No. of seasons: 1
- No. of episodes: 17

Production
- Executive producer: Sidney Sheldon
- Producer: Jerome Courtland
- Camera setup: Multi-camera
- Running time: 25 minutes
- Production companies: Sidney Sheldon Productions; Screen Gems

Original release
- Network: NBC
- Release: September 17, 1970 – January 7, 1971

Nancy is an American sitcom that aired on NBC during the 1970–1971 television season, with Renne Jarrett in the title role.

== Synopsis ==
While Nancy Smith, daughter of the President of the United States, is vacationing in fictitious Center City, Iowa, she meets veterinarian Adam Hudson. Their romance struggles due to the constant surveillance of the Secret Service, Nancy's chaperone Abby, and Adam's uncle Everett, as well as the local press.

== Cast ==
- Renne Jarrett as Nancy Smith
- John Fink as Adam Hudson
- Robert F. Simon as Everett McPherson
- Celeste Holm as Abby Townsend
- William Bassett as Agent Turner
- Ernesto Macias as Agent Rodriguez
- Eddie Applegate as Willie Maxwell
- Frank Aletter as Tom Daily

== Production notes ==
A Screen Gems Production, Nancy was a creation of Sidney Sheldon, who wrote every episode under various pseudonyms ("Mark Rowane", "Christopher Golato", "Allan Devon").

== Broadcast history ==
Nancy aired from September 17, 1970, to January 7, 1971, on Thursday in the 9:30 Eastern timeslot between Ironside and The Dean Martin Show. The competition was another sitcom, The Odd Couple, on ABC, and the second half-hour of the CBS Thursday Night Movies.

== Promotion ==
In an effort to generate interest in Nancy, a novel based on the TV series was released at the same time as the show. Jarrett, Fink, and Holm also appeared on the cover of TV Guide, which coincided with the November 5, 1970 wedding episode. But it wasn't enough to generate viewer interest.

== Episodes ==
Seventeen episodes of Nancy were broadcast before the show's cancellation.

No.	Title	Directed by	Written by	Original release date
1	"It's a Good Day for Meeting the President's Daughter"	E. W. Swackhamer	Unknown	September 17, 1970
Nancy and Abby travel to Center City, Iowa for a horse show. When one of Nancy's horses becomes sick, Adam arrives to treat it; when he meets Nancy, they immediately fall in love. Adam flees when he discovers who Nancy is, but she gets him back. He plants a sycamore tree in a grove where each man of his family plants a sycamore for the woman he loves, then proposes to Nancy in the grove. She accepts. Abby and Uncle Everett oppose the relationship at first, and press hounding puts so much pressure on the couple that they break off their engagement. But Uncle Everett tells each of them that the other has killed the sycamore, and they rush back to the grove and reunite.
2	"Guess Who's Coming to the White House?"	Alan Rafkin	Mark Rowane	September 24, 1970
While treating a sick cow in Center City, Adam misses the engagement party the President is giving for him and Nancy in Washington, D.C.
3	"The Smallest Diamond in the World"	Unknown	Unknown	October 1, 1970
Adam decides that he needs to buy a spectacular engagement ring for Nancy because she is the daughter of the President, but price is a definite object.
4	"It's a Bad Day for Meeting Presidents"	Claudio Guzmán	Unknown	October 8, 1970
The President comes to Center City to meet and have dinner with Adam, but a diligent United States Secret Service agent prevents Adam from getting to the dinner.
5	"Just Call Us Incompatible"	Claudio Guzmán	Christopher Golato	October 15, 1970
Computer analysis determines Nancy and Adam to be incompatible.
6	"Adam, the TV Star"	Alan Rafkin	Allan Devon	October 22, 1970
Wanting to maintain his privacy, Adam rejects a request to appear in a televised press conference to discuss his engagement to Nancy, but after he acquiesces, he acts like a television star at the press conference.
7	"East Is East and West Is West"	Unknown	Unknown	October 29, 1970
After Adam meets some of Nancy's friends, he worries that a small-town veterinarian like him will never fit into her sophisticated world.
8	"Here Comes the Groom"	E. W. Swackhamer	Christopher Golato	November 5, 1970
Overcoming pre-wedding jitters, a lost wedding ring, their wedding cake being dropped, and a hurricane, Nancy and Adam get married.
9	"Honeymoon for Twelve"	Unknown	Unknown	November 12, 1970
Secret Service concerns about Nancy's security block the couple's plans for a nice honeymoon away from Abby and the Secret Service, so they sneak away to Lake Bageneehawk.
10	"Going, Going, Gone"	Unknown	Unknown	November 19, 1970
Adam's house is too small to accommodate Nancy, Abby, and the two Secret Service men assigned to Nancy, so Nancy and Adam need to decide whether they should move to a bigger home.
11	"First One Hundred Years Are the Hardest"	Unknown	Unknown	November 26, 1970
Nancy and Adam move to a new house on a farm, but Nancy has forgotten to have the utilities turned on and the moving company has gone on strike, leaving them with no furniture.
12	"Busiest Bride in the World"	Claudio Guzmán	Christopher Golato	December 3, 1970
Nancy has too many duties to perform as daughter of the President, so she gives up helping her father in his political career.
13	"A Case of Spring Fever"	Jerome Courtland	Mark Rowane	December 10, 1970
Jim Nielson, the most eligible man in Iowa, courts Abby, but she turns down his proposal of marriage.
14	"Boys' Night Out"	Unknown	Unknown	December 17, 1970
Wednesday is Adam's "Boys' Night Out," and though Nancy and Adam would rather be together that night, neither will admit it.
15	"Never Look a Gift Horse in the Mouth"	Herb Wallerstein	William Canning & Allan Devon	December 24, 1970
As a wedding present, Lord and Lady Halford give Nancy and Adam the services of very proper English butler Milton for a year, and he keeps getting between the newlyweds and newlywed-type bliss.
16	"Budget, Budget, Who's Got the Budget?"	Allen Baron	Mark Rowane	December 31, 1970
After Nancy spends too much money decorating Adam's office, she discusses the couple's financial problems with her father, resulting in a number of government agencies attempting to help Nancy and Adam with their finances and the couple almost losing their farm.
17	"A Girl's Best Friend"	Jerome Courtland	Christopher Golato	January 7, 1971
Nancy and Adam take in a stray dog with a hand-painted star on his neck and name him Star. He knows many impressive tricks, and Adam's idea that he might be a performing dog is confirmed when the New Jersey Continental Circus contacts Adam: Star is theirs and they want him back. Nancy adores Star, so Adam schemes to return Star to his circus and get another dog and paint a star on his neck.
