= Harold A. Winston =

American stage actor (1901–1964)

Harold A. Winston (August 28, 1901 – July 16, 1964) was an American stage actor and promoter, best known for his work as a dialog director at Columbia Pictures and Warner Bros.

== Early life ==
Winston was born Harry Weinstein on August 28, 1901 to Jacob and Fanny Weinstein in Manhattan. His Jewish parents and their two teenage sons had left Russia to escape the pogroms of the Czar. Two older siblings, Adolph and Sadie, were also born in New York. At age 19 he was listed as working as an editor in the publishing industry in New York City.

== Acting career ==
Winston is variously described as an actor in New York, a promoter and a person who stages plays; a dialog director, a coach, and a scout in Hollywood. Howard W. Polsky wrote in his book How I am a Jew—Adventures into My Jewish-American Identity, "In the twenties and thirties scores of Jews changed their name in part to disguise their identity. Weinstein became Winston…"

His earliest theatrical credit listed is A Night in Avignon in 1919. Other theater productions he performed in as an actor include: The Claw 1921-22, Children of the Moon 1923, Bridge of Distances 1925. He was involved in the staging of the plays: Brass Ankle 1931 about the multi-racial group known as Brass Ankles, written by Dubose Heyward the writer of Porgy and Bess; The Other One 1932; and The Blue Widow 1933

Moving to Hollywood he worked first at Columbia Studios and later at Warner Bros. In his autobiography Frank Capra called him one of his "needlers three", along with Joseph Sistrom and Chester Sticht: "These were my ‘needlers three"---Sistrom, Winston, Sticht. Their jobs: gadflys, deflaters, goaders. Their purpose: to keep me from being satisfied; nothing I did was good enough—I could do better. Their virtue—a fierce loyalty to me and my films."

Capra went on: "Winston was a refugee from the New York footlights, now serving as my dialogue coach. Winston was a gentle, sensitive soul who loved all that was beautiful, loathed all that was shoddy. As a purist in aesthetics his taste could discriminate between what was artistic and what was merely pleasing or utilitarian."

In 1939 Winston as studio scout is credited with helping discover actor William Holden, naming him in honor of his ex-wife, Gloria Holden. A version of how Holden obtained his stage name is based on a statement by George Ross of Billboard magazine. George Ross stated: "William Holden, the lad just signed for the coveted lead in Golden Boy used to be Bill Beadle. And here is how he obtained his new movie tag. On the Columbia lot is an assistant director and scout named Harold Winston. Not long ago he was divorced from the actress, Gloria Holden, but carried the torch after the marital rift. Winston was one of those who discovered the "Golden Boy" newcomer and who renamed him—in honor of his former spouse!..."

Between 1937 and 1944 there are eleven works in his filmography for which he is listed as a dialog director: Lost Horizon 1937, Mr. Smith Goes to Washington 1939, Three Sons O'Guns 1941, Dangerously They Live 1941, International Squadron 1941, Blues in the Night 1941, The Big Shot 1942, Action in the North Atlantic 1943, The Hard Way 1943, The Desert Song 1943, and Arsenic and Old Lace 1944.

He worked with the USO as a director during World War II.

Later in his autobiography, Capra referred again to Winston. He felt loneliness when working on the movie It's a Wonderful Life because the three people he depended on had scattered. At this point, he calls them his "fiddlers three". Capra stated that "Winston had disappeared".

Back in the northeast by 1946, Winston started a "Theater of the Open Road". He sent out groups of six to eight actors in two repertory companies, both Equity and non-Equity, to New England and the Middle West.

In 1957 he appeared on television as a guest star in the Hallmark Hall of Fame drama "The Lark", see: The Lark (play) (Season 6, Episode 4, List of Hallmark Hall of Fame episodes), playing the part of a promoter. He was production manager for the films: Machete in 1958, Counterplot in 1959, and Fiend of Dope Island in 1961.

== Personal life ==
His first marriage was to actress Gloria Holden, on December 17, 1932. They divorced December 2, 1937. Gloria Holden stated at their divorce that "he said he didn’t like the state of marriage—in fact, that he didn’t believe in it for artists."

He married his second wife, Barbara McKenzie, on August 10, 1949. They divorced April 1955 in Alabama.

He remained married to his third wife Carolyn until his death from heart disease in Oslo, Norway on July 16, 1964.

He never had children.
