= Bruce Bilson =

American film and television director (1928–2026)

- Born: May 19, 1928; New York City, U.S.
- Died: January 16, 2026 (aged 97); Los Angeles, California, U.S.
- Resting place: Hillside Memorial Park Cemetery
- Education: UCLA
- Occupations: Director, producer, screenwriter
- Years active: 1955–2006
- Spouses: Mona Weichman (m. 1955; div. 1976) Renne Jarrett (m. 1981)
- Children: 2, including Danny Bilson
- Relatives: Rachel Bilson (granddaughter)

Bruce Bilson (May 19, 1928 – January 16, 2026) was an American film and television director. He is most notable for his work as a regular director on the spy spoof Get Smart. He won the 1967–1968 Primetime Emmy Award for Outstanding Directing for a Comedy Series for the third season Get Smart episode "Maxwell Smart, Private Eye".

== Early life and career ==
Bilson was born in Brooklyn on May 19, 1928, to Jewish parents. His mother, Hattie Bilson (née Dratwa; 1907–2004), was an American screenwriter, and his father, George Bilson (1902–1981), was a British producer/writer/director of Ashkenazi Jewish descent who was born in Leeds, England. His brother, Malcolm is a fortepianist and professor of piano at Cornell University.

He graduated from UCLA School of Theater, Film and Television in 1950.

== Personal life and death ==
Bilson married Mona Weichman on August 31, 1955; they divorced in 1976. They had two children, Danny Bilson (born 1956), a film and video game writer/producer and father of actress Rachel Bilson, and Julie Ahlberg, a film producer.

In 1981, he married Renne Jarrett.

Bilson died at his home in Los Angeles, California on January 16, 2026, at the age of 97.

== Filmography ==
=== Film ===
- Pate Katelin en Buenos Aires (1969)
- The Girl Who Came Gift-Wrapped (1974)
- The Wackiest Wagon Train in the West (1976)
- The North Avenue Irregulars (1979)
- Chattanooga Choo Choo (1984)

=== Television ===
- The Andy Griffith Show (assistant director 1960–1963)
- Please Don't Eat the Daisies (TV series, 1965)
- The Patty Duke Show (TV series, 1965, 1 episode)
- Gidget (TV series) (1965)
- Hogan's Heroes (TV series, 1965)
- Camp Runamuck (TV series, 1966, 1 episode)
- Bewitched (TV series, 1968, 1 episode)
- The Ghost & Mrs. Muir (TV series, 1968)
- Blondie (TV series, 1968)
- The Doris Day Show (TV series, 1968, 1 episode)
- Get Smart (TV series, 1965–1968, 22 episodes)
- Nanny and the Professor (TV series, 1970)
- Bonanza (TV series, 1970, 1 episode)
- Arnie (TV series, 1970)
- Barefoot in the Park (TV series, 1970)
- The Mary Tyler Moore Show (TV series, 1971–1977)
- The Odd Couple (TV series, 1970–1971, 5 episodes)
- Green Acres (TV series, 1971, 1 episode)
- Love, American Style (TV series, 1969–1971, 8 episodes)
- Alias Smith and Jones (TV series, 1972, 1 episode)
- The Paul Lynde Show (TV series, 1972, 1 episode)
- Temperatures Rising (TV series, 1972, 1 episode)
- M*A*S*H (TV series, 1972, 1 episode)
- The Brady Bunch (TV series, 1973, 1 episode)
- The Six Million Dollar Man (TV series, 1974)
- Dusty's Trail (TV series, 1974, 1 episode)
- Sierra (TV series, 1974)
- The Rookies (TV series, 1974–1975, 3 episodes)
- Dead Man on the Run (TV movie, 1975)
- When Things Were Rotten (TV series, 1975)
- Emergency! (TV series, 1975, 1 episode)
- Barbary Coast (TV series, 1975, 1 episode)
- Hawaii Five-O (TV series, 1974–1976, 5 episodes)
- S.W.A.T. (TV series, 1975–1976, 3 episodes)
- Wonder Woman (TV series, 1976)
- Tabitha (TV series, 1976, 1 episode)
- The New Daughters of Joshua Cabe (TV movie, 1976)
- Alice (TV series, 1976)
- Barney Miller (TV series, 1976–1981, 10 episodes)
- Hunter (TV series, 1977)
- The Feather and Father Gang (TV series, 1977, 1 episode)
- The Love Boat (TV series, 1977)
- Quark (TV series, 1978, 1 episode)
- B.J. and the Bear (TV movie, 1978)
- Pleasure Cove (TV movie, 1979)
- Dallas Cowboys Cheerleaders (TV movie, 1979)
- Delta House (TV series, 1979)
- Turnabout (TV series, 1979, 1 episode)
- The Bad News Bears (TV series, 1979)
- The Ghosts of Buxley Hall (TV movie: Disney's Wonderful World, 1980)
- Harper Valley PTA (1981, 3 episodes)
- Half Nelson (1985, pilot episode)
- The Bradys (1990, 3 episodes)
- The Flash (TV series, 1991)
