= Casa Mañana (film) =

1951 film directed by Jean Yarbrough

- Theatrical release poster
- Directed by: Jean Yarbrough
- Screenplay by: William Raynor
- Produced by: Lindsley Parsons
- Starring: Virginia Welles; Robert Clarke; Robert Karnes; Tony Roux; Carol Brewster; Paul Maxey
- Cinematography: William A. Sickner
- Edited by: Ace Herman
- Production company: Monogram Pictures
- Distributed by: Monogram Pictures
- Release date: June 10, 1951
- Running time: 73 minutes
- Country: United States
- Language: English

Casa Mañana is a 1951 American musical film directed by Jean Yarbrough, written by William Raynor and starring Virginia Welles, Robert Clarke, Robert Karnes, Tony Roux, Carol Brewster and Paul Maxey. The film was released on June 10, 1951 by Monogram Pictures.

== Cast ==
- Virginia Welles as Linda Mason
- Robert Clarke as Larry Sawyer
- Robert Karnes as Horace Fairchild III
- Tony Roux as Pedro Gonzales
- Carol Brewster as 'Honey' La Verne
- Paul Maxey as Maury Sanford
- Jean Richey as 'Rusty'
- Jim Rio as Jake
- Frank Rio as Jock
- Larry Rio as Jack
- Eddie Le Baron as Orchestra Leader
- Spade Cooley as Bandleader
- Yadira Jiménez as Dancer
- Olga Pérez as Olga Pérez
