= Tom Tully =

American actor (1908–1982)

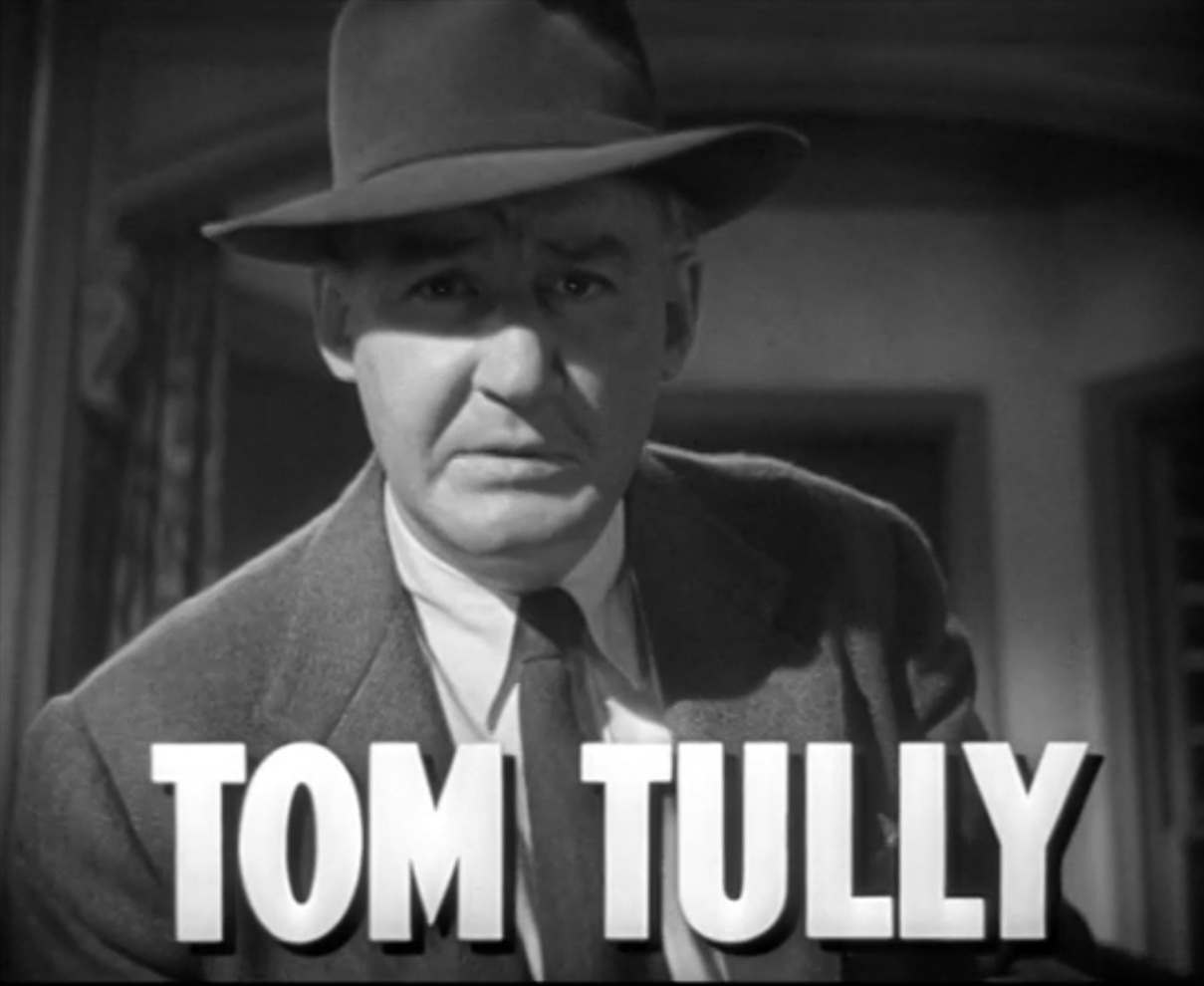
- Trailer for Lady in the Lake (1946)
- Born: Thomas Kane Tulley; August 21, 1908; Durango, Colorado, U.S.
- Died: April 27, 1982 (aged 73); Newport Beach, California, U.S.
- Occupation: Actor
- Years active: 1937–1973
- Spouses: Helen Ross (m. 1930; div. 1935) Frances McHugh (m. 1938; died 1953) Ida Johnson (m. 1954)
- Children: 1

Thomas Kane Tulley (August 21, 1908 – April 27, 1982) was an American actor. He began his career in radio and on the stage before making his film debut in Northern Pursuit (1943). Subsequently, he was nominated for an Academy Award for his supporting role in The Caine Mutiny (1954).

In 1960, Tully was honored with a star on the Hollywood Walk of Fame for his contributions to the film industry.

== Early years ==
Tully was born in Durango in southwestern Colorado, the son of Thomas H. Tulley and Victoria Lenore Day Tulley. After a stint in the United States Navy he worked as a reporter for the Denver Post, before he began acting with the expectation of better pay.

== Career ==
=== Stage ===
Tully debuted on Broadway in Call Me Ziggy (1937). His other Broadway credits include The Sun Field (1942), The Strings, My Lord, Are False (1942), Jason (1942), Ah, Wilderness! (1941), The Time of Your Life (1940), Night Music (1940), The Time of Your Life (1939), The White Steed (1939), and Chalked Out (1937).

=== Radio ===
In the era of old-time radio, Tully had the lead role of Joe in the serial Home of the Brave. He also played Jim Carroll in the serial Life Begins, Uncle Willie in the comedy My Mother's Husband, and Charles Martin in the serial Stella Dallas. He was a frequent guest actor on Gunsmoke, portraying a wide range of parts.

=== Film ===
Tully's Hollywood film career spanned from the 1930s until 1973. After a brief appearance in the film Carefree (1938), he next appeared in I'll Be Seeing You (1944) as the father of Shirley Temple's character.

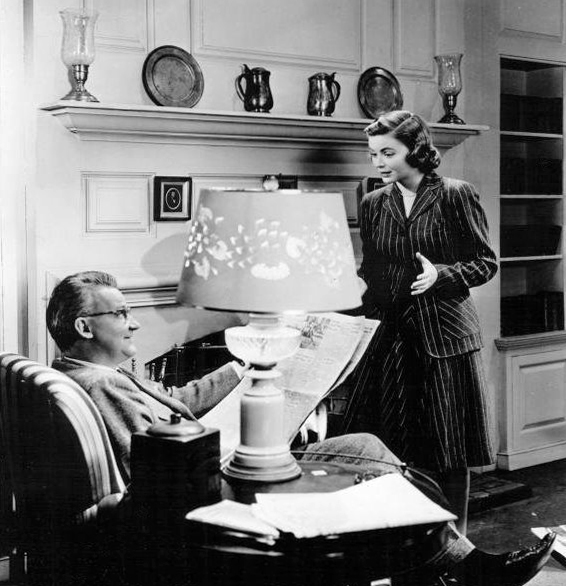
Tully and Dorothy McGuire in the short film Reward Unlimited (1944)

He received an Academy Award nomination for Actor in a Supporting Role for portraying the first commander of the Caine in the 1954 drama The Caine Mutiny, with Humphrey Bogart.

His last feature film role was as a crooked gun dealer, seated in a wheelchair after having his left leg removed close to the hip, in Don Siegel's popular crime film Charley Varrick (1973), with Walter Matthau and Joe Don Baker.

=== Television ===
From 1954 through 1960, he played the role of police Inspector Matt Grebb on the CBS police drama, The Lineup, with co-star Warner Anderson. In repeats, The Lineup was known as San Francisco Beat.

He made two appearances as Rob Petrie's (Dick Van Dyke) father on CBS's The Dick Van Dyke Show in 1964 and 1966. This role reunited Tully with Jerry Paris from The Caine Mutiny. He also was a guest star on The Andy Griffith Show during the seventh season. He played Walt, the milkman in the episode, "Goodbye, Dolly."

In 1962, he appeared on the NBC modern Western series Empire, in the role of Tom Cole in the episode "Long Past, Long Remembered." Richard Jordan also appeared in this episode as Jay Bee Fowler. The series starred Richard Egan as New Mexico rancher Jim Redigo. In 1963, he was cast as Danny Mundt in "A Taste for Pineapple" of the ABC crime drama, The Untouchables. That same year he portrayed Jethro Tate in "Who Killed Billy Jo?" on another ABC crime drama, Burke's Law, with Gene Barry.

In 1964, Tully had two appearances on CBS's Perry Mason. The first was as defendant Carey York in "The Case of the Arrogant Arsonist;" the second was as murder victim Harvey Scott in "The Case of the Nautical Knot." During the 1966 season of ABC's Shane western series, he made 17 appearances as Tom Starett. Tully also guest starred twice in the western TV series Bonanza: in the 1965 episode "The Dilemma" as Sundown Davis and in the 1967 episode "The Sure Thing" as Burt Laughlin.

Later, Tully continued his acting in television dramas such as Mission: Impossible and The Rookies.

== Later years ==
In November 1969, Tully traveled to South Vietnam, currently Vietnam, for the United Service Organization. His "handshake tour" took him to hospitals, radio interviews, and flight behind enemy lines, courtesy of the 173rd Airborne Brigade, to visit strategic military outposts such as the "Hawks Nest" in the Phum Valley. While in Vietnam entertaining troops, Tully contracted a filarial worm.

== Politics ==
Tully refused to join the Motion Picture Alliance for the Preservation of American Ideals, and was out of work during the Hollywood blacklist, for nine months.

== Personal life and death ==
In 1930, Tully married Helen Ross in Colorado. They had a daughter Jean in 1931. They were divorced on November 26, 1935. In 1938, he married actress Frances McHugh, to whom he remained wed until her death in 1953. On June 20, 1954, he married Ida Johnson in Los Angeles, and they remained married until his death.

Tully played chess by mail, was a fly-fisherman, and voiced children's books for an elementary school.

Tully died of cancer at the age of 73 on April 27, 1982, at Hoag Memorial Hospital in Newport Beach, California.

== Recognition ==
Tully's Hollywood Walk of Fame star, located at 6119 Hollywood Boulevard, was one of the inaugural 1,558 stars unveiled in 1960. The name on the star is incorrectly written as Thomas L. Tully. Tully did not know he had a star, and at one point a fan club offered to raise money to get him one, but he told them not to (this despite him personally wanting one). His family discovered the star and confirmed it was his after his death.

== Partial filmography ==
- The Sign of the Cross (1932) as Hoboken (1944 re-release prologue) (uncredited)
- Mission to Moscow (1943) as American Engineer in Russia (uncredited)
- Northern Pursuit (1943) as Inspector Barnett
- Destination Tokyo (1943) as Mike Conners
- Reward Unlimited (1944, Short) as Peggy's Father
- Secret Command (1944) as Colonel Hugo Von Braun aka 'Brownie' Brownell
- The Town Went Wild (1944) as Henry Harrison
- I'll Be Seeing You (1944) as Mr. Marshall
- The Unseen (1945) as Sullivan
- Kiss and Tell (1945) as Bob Pringle
- Adventure (1945) as Gus
- The Virginian (1946) as Nebraska
- Till the End of Time (1946) as C.W. Harper
- Lady in the Lake (1946) as Captain Kane
- Intrigue (1947) as Marc Andrews
- Killer McCoy (1947) as Cecil Y. Walsh
- Scudda Hoo! Scudda Hay! (1948) as Robert 'Roarer' McGill
- Rachel and the Stranger (1948) as Parson Jackson
- June Bride (1948) as Mr. Whitman Brinker
- Blood on the Moon (1948) as John Lufton
- Illegal Entry (1949) as Nick Gruber
- A Kiss for Corliss (1949) as Harry P. Archer
- The Lady Takes a Sailor (1949) as Henry Duckworth
- Where the Sidewalk Ends (1950) as Jiggs Taylor
- Branded (1950) as Ransom
- Tomahawk (1951) as Dan Castello
- Dick Turpin's Ride (1951) as Tom King
- Texas Carnival (1951) as Sheriff Jackson
- Return of the Texan (1952) as Stud Spiller
- Love Is Better Than Ever (1952) as Mr. Charles E. Macaboy
- Lure of the Wilderness (1952) as Zack Taylor
- The Turning Point (1952) as Matt Conroy
- Ruby Gentry (1952) as Jud Corey
- The Jazz Singer (1952) as Dan McGurney
- Trouble Along the Way (1953) as Father Malone
- The Moon Is Blue (1953) as Michael O'Neill
- Die Jungfrau auf dem Dach (1953) as Michael O'Neill
- Sea of Lost Ships (1953) as Ice Patrol Captain Holland
- Arrow in the Dust (1954) as Crowshaw
- The Caine Mutiny (1954) as Lieutenant Commander William H. De Vriess
- Soldier of Fortune (1955) as Tweedie
- Love Me or Leave Me (1955) as Frobisher
- Behind the High Wall (1956) as Warden Frank Carmichael
- Ten North Frederick (1958) as Mike Slattery
- The Wackiest Ship in the Army (1960) as Captain McClung
- The Carpetbaggers (1964) as Amos Winthrop
- McHale's Navy Joins the Air Force (1965) as General Harkness
- Coogan's Bluff (1968) as Sheriff McCrea
- Charley Varrick (1973) as Tom

== Television ==
Year	Title	Role	Notes
1960	Alfred Hitchcock Presents	Phil Canby	Season 5 Episode 18: "Backward, Turn Backward"
1961	Rawhide	Dan Yates	S4:E1, "Incident at Rio Salado"
1965	Rawhide	Clete Bonner	S7:E19, "Blood Harvest"
