= F. Hugh Herbert =

Filmmaker (1897–1958)

- Born: Frederick Hugh Herbert; May 29, 1897; Vienna, Austria-Hungary
- Died: May 17, 1958 (aged 60); Beverly Hills, California, US
- Occupation(s): Novelist, playwright, scenarist
- Relatives: Kathleen Hughes (niece)

Frederick Hugh Herbert (May 29, 1897 – May 17, 1958) was a playwright, screenwriter, novelist, short story writer, and infrequent film director.

== Life and career ==
Born in Vienna, Austria in 1897, Herbert was educated at the University of London. He emigrated to the United States from England on the S/S Kroonland, which docked at the port of New York on September 11, 1920. He joined Paramount Pictures as a film writer, beginning his career in 1926 with two projects starring Conrad Nagel, The Waning Sex and There You Are!, the latter adapted from his play of the same title. His screenwriting credits included Vanity Fair, Fashions of 1934; Smarty in 1934, adapted from his own play; Sitting Pretty; Dark Command; Our Very Own; The Little Hut; Scudda Hoo! Scudda Hay! and The Girls of Pleasure Island, the last two of which he also directed. He co-wrote a few films in which the similarly named, but unrelated actor Hugh Herbert appeared: Fashions of 1934 (1934), We're in the Money (1935) and Colleen (1936).

Herbert's play The Moon Is Blue (1951) had a run of 924 performances on Broadway. It was adapted for the screen version produced and directed by Otto Preminger, who had been responsible for the stage production. The film adaptation, released in 1953, was controversial at the time owing to its frank language and sexual themes. When the Breen office refused to give it a Motion Picture Production Code seal of approval, United Artists opted to release the film without one, and the success of the film was instrumental in weakening the long-standing influence of the Code. Herbert's 1947 play For Love or Money was filmed in 1959 as This Happy Feeling. He adapted the Italian play The Best House in Naples for Broadway in 1956.

Herbert wrote several novels, including I'd Rather Be Kissed (1954). He also wrote a book of poems.

He won the Writers Guild of America Award for Sitting Pretty and was nominated for The Moon is Blue. He was president of the Screen Writers Guild from 1953 to 1954 and was chairman until 1957.

Herbert died in Beverly Hills in 1958. He was the uncle of actress Kathleen Hughes.

== Corliss Archer (franchise) ==
One of Herbert's most enduring creations was the character of American teenager Corliss Archer, who was introduced in 1943 in a series of Good Housekeeping short stories. The story cycle was quickly adapted to radio, as Meet Corliss Archer, and to theatre, as Kiss and Tell. Shirley Temple performed Corliss on screen in the 1945 film version of Kiss and Tell and in the 1949 sequel, A Kiss for Corliss. Herbert's property was later adapted as a comic book series also titled Meet Corliss Archer, as well as a television series, Meet Corliss Archer.

== Works ==
=== Plays ===
- Quiet, Please! (1940)
- Kiss and Tell (1943)
- For Keeps (1944)
- For Love or Money (1947)
- The Moon Is Blue (1951)
- A Girl Can Tell (1953)
- The Best House in Naples (1956)

=== Short fiction ===
Stories

Title	Year	First published	Reprinted/collected	Notes
We were just having fun			Herbert, F. Hugh (1953). "We were just having fun". In Birmingham, Frederic A. (ed.). The girls from Esquire. London: Arthur Barker. pp. 224–232.	

== Filmography ==
As screenwriter unless otherwise indicated.

- The Waning Sex (1926)
- There You Are! (1926; also based on his play)
- The Demi-Bride (1927)
- On Ze Boulevard (1927; story)
- Adam and Evil (1927)
- Tea for Three (1927)
- Baby Mine (1928; scenario)
- The Baby Cyclone (1928)
- Beau Broadway (1928)
- The Baby Cyclone (1928)
- The Cardboard Lover (1928)
- Lights of New York (1928)
- A Single Man (1929)
- Noisy Neighbors (1929)
- Murder on the Roof (1930)
- Road to Yesterday (1930)
- Road to Paradise (1930)
- Vanity Fair (1932)
- The Stoker (1932)
- The Penal Code (1932)
- The Constant Woman (1933; adaptation and dialogue)
- One Year Later (1933; also story)
- The Women in His Life (1933)
- By Candlelight (1933)
- Daring Daughters (1933)
- Smarty (1934; also based on his play)
- Fashions of 1934 (1934)
- The Journal of a Crime (1934)
- The Dragon Murder Case (1934)
- The Secret Bride (1934)
- The Traveling Saleslady (1935)
- The Widow from Monte Carlo (1935)
- Personal Maid's Secret (1935)
- We're in the Money (1935)
- If You Could Only Cook (1935; story)
- Colleen (1936)
- Snowed Under (1936)
- The Case of the Black Cat (1936)
- As Good as Married (1937)
- The Road to Reno (1938)
- That Certain Age (1938; story)
- Dark Command (1940)
- Hit Parade of 1941 (1940)
- Women in War (1940; also story)
- Three Faces West (1940)
- Melody Ranch (1940)
- West Point Widow (1941)
- My Heart Belongs to Daddy (1942)
- Fly-by-Night (1942)
- Together Again (1944)
- Kiss and Tell (1945; also based on his play)
- Men in Her Diary (1945)
- A Guy Could Change (1946; story)
- Home Sweet Homicide (1946)
- Margie (1946)
- Sitting Pretty (1948)
- Scudda Hoo! Scudda Hay! (1948; also directed)
- Our Very Own (1950)
- Let's Make It Legal (1951)
- The Girls of Pleasure Island (1953; also directed)
- The Moon Is Blue (1953; also based on his play)
- Die Jungfrau auf dem Dach (1953; based on a translation of his play)
- The Little Hut (1957; also produced)
- This Happy Feeling (1958); also adapted from his play)
