= Gloria Holden =

American actress (1903–1991)

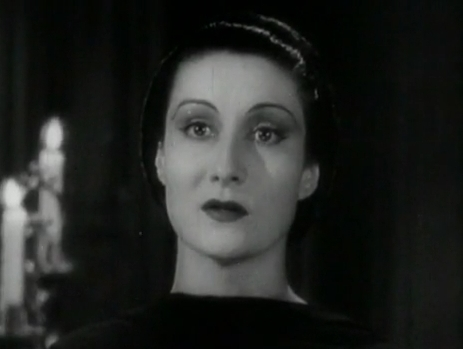
- Holden in Dracula's Daughter (1936)
- Born: Gloria Anna Holden; September 5, 1903; London, England
- Died: March 22, 1991 (aged 87); Redlands, California, U.S.
- Education: American Academy of Dramatic Arts
- Occupation: Actress
- Years active: 1934–1958
- Spouse(s): Harry Dawson Reynolds (m. 1921–19??; divorced); 1 son Harold A. Winston (1932–1937; divorced); William Hoyt (1944–1991; her death); 1 son
- Children: 2

Gloria Anna Holden (September 5, 1903 – March 22, 1991) was an English-born American actress, active in films from the 1930s through the 1950s. She often portrayed cold society women, but was best known for her portrayal of the title character in the horror film Dracula's Daughter (1936).

== Early life ==
Holden was born in London in 1903, the daughter of Charles Laurence Sutherland and his German wife Eska (née Bergmann). She emigrated to the United States as a child with her parents.

Holden attended school in Wayne, Pennsylvania, and later studied at New York's American Academy of Dramatic Arts. Before she became an actress, she modeled for artists, was a shopper for a store, and worked in a beauty salon. In her early teens, living in suburban Philadelphia (Gladwyne), she took voice lessons from Philip Warren Cook and was a church chorister in Ardmore and, later, Overbrook.

== Career ==
=== Theatre ===
Holden's early stage work included replacing in the role of Della in the 1927 original Broadway production of George S. Kaufman and Edna Ferber’s The Royal Family. Holden also served as understudy for the roles of Julie Cavendish, Gwen Cavendish, and Kitty Dean. From January to March of 1929, Holden appeared in That Ferguson Family, succeeding Rita Paige in the role of Laura Connelly. The following year, Holden served as understudy to Mary Ellis in Children of Darkness. In May 1931, Holden replaced Lilly Cahill in As Husbands Go.

In 1932, Holden was originally announced to be a part of the Lawrence Hazard play Manhattan Melody (adapted by L. Lawrence Weber), which was set to play the Majestic Theatre in Brooklyn then possibly transfer to Broadway's Longacre Theatre, however the production never materialized.

Holden was originally announced for the world premiere of Myron Fagan’s play Memory, which was set to bow in New York in 1933, however the play ended up playing at Los Angeles’ Biltmore Theatre (opening on May 7. 1934), and Holden was not part of the company.

Holden was active in stock theater in Cincinnati, Ohio; Princeton, New Jersey; and Scarborough, New York.

=== Films ===
Her first credited film role is Wife vs. Secretary (1936), starring Clark Gable, Jean Harlow and Myrna Loy. She may be best remembered for two roles in her long career, that of Mme. Zola (Alexandrine Zola) in the Outstanding Production-winner biopic The Life of Emile Zola (1937), as well as her "exotic" depiction of the title role in Dracula's Daughter (1936). Her performance in the latter influenced the writings of horror novelist Anne Rice, and Dracula's Daughter is directly mentioned in Rice's novel The Queen of the Damned. In July 1937, Holden was assigned to play the character of Marian Morgan in The Man Without a Country (1937). The Technicolor short co-starred John Litel and was nominated for a Short Subject (Color) Academy Award. Her film career ended with This Happy Feeling (1958).

=== Radio ===
Holden performed on Eddie Cantor's radio program for 26 weeks and played a non-singing Julie La Verne on the 1940 Lux Radio Theatre adaptation of Show Boat, based on the 1936 film version.

== Personal life ==
Holden married Harry Dawson Reynolds in 1921. The following year, she gave birth to a son, Lawrence Reynolds. She married, secondly, to Harold A. Winston on December 17, 1932. This union also ended in divorce, on December 2, 1937.

In 1944, she married her third husband, William Hoyt, to whom she remained married until her death. They had one son, William Christopher Hoyt, who was born in 1948 and killed by a boulder rolled onto his car in 1970, listed as a homicide.

=== Death ===
Holden died at Redlands hospital of a myocardial infarction in 1991, aged 87.

== Legacy ==
Harold Winston, Gloria Holden's second husband, was credited with helping discover actor William Holden. An account of how William Holden obtained his stage name is based on a statement by George Ross of Billboard magazine: "William Holden, the lad just signed for the coveted lead in 'Golden Boy', used to be Bill Beadle. And here is how he obtained his new movie tag. On the Columbia lot is an assistant director and scout named Harold Winston. Not long ago he was divorced from the actress, Gloria Holden, but carried the torch after the marital rift. Winston was one of those who discovered the "Golden Boy" newcomer and who renamed him — in honor of his former spouse!..."

== Partial filmography ==
- The Return of Chandu (1934, Serial) - Party Guest [Ch. 1] (uncredited)
- Wife vs. Secretary (1936) - Joan Carstairs
- Dracula's Daughter (1936) - Countess Marya Zaleska (Dracula's Daughter)
- The Life of Emile Zola (1937) - Alexandrine Zola
- Hawaii Calls (1938) - Mrs. Milburn
- Test Pilot (1938) - Mrs. May Benson
- Girls' School (1938) - Miss Laurel
- Dodge City (1939) - Mrs. Cole
- Miracles for Sale (1939) - Madame Rapport
- A Child Is Born (1939) - Mrs. Kempner
- This Thing Called Love (1940) - Genevieve Hooper
- Passage from Hong Kong (1941) - Madame Wrangell
- The Corsican Brothers (1941) - Countess Franchi
- A Gentleman After Dark (1942) - Miss Clark
- Miss Annie Rooney (1942) - Esther White
- Apache Trail (1942) - Mrs. James V. Thorne
- Behind the Rising Sun (1943) - Sara Braden
- Strange Holiday (1945) - Mrs. (Jean) Stevenson
- The Girl of the Limberlost (1945) - Phyllis Gray
- Adventures of Rusty (1945) - Louise Hover
- Hit the Hay (1945) - Mimi Valdez
- Strange Holiday (1946) - Mrs. McDonnell (uncredited)
- Undercover Maisie (1947) - Mrs. Guy Canford
- The Hucksters (1947) - Mrs. Kimberly
- Killer McCoy (1947) - Mrs. Laura McCoy
- The Sickle or the Cross (1949) - Louise Cannon
- A Kiss for Corliss (1949) - Mrs. Janet Archer
- Has Anybody Seen My Gal (1952) - Clarissa Pennock
- Dream Wife (1953) - Mrs. Jean Landwell
- The Eddy Duchin Story (1956) - Mrs. Duchin
- This Happy Feeling (1958) - Mrs. Dover
- Auntie Mame (1958) - Guest at Garden Party (uncredited) (final film role)

== Sources ==
- The New York Times, "In The Summer Spotlight", June 14, 1931, p. X3.
- New York Times, "Theatrical Notes", August 27, 1932, p. 13.
- New York Times, "16 New Plays Open In Byways Tonight", August 14, 1933, p. 18.
- New York Times, "Theatrical Notes", January 27, 1934, p. 8.
- New York Times, "Listing The Week's New Shows", July 21, 1935, p. X1.
- Zanesville Signal, "Liberty Horror Film", June 23, 1936, p. 11.
- Los Angeles Times, "New Film Productions Started In Last Week". February 2, 1936, p. C1.
- Los Angeles Times, "The Pageant of The Film World", July 14, 1937, p. 13.
- Los Angeles Times, "Around And About In Hollywood", October 4, 1937, p. A9
- Los Angeles Times, "Town Called Hollywood", August 21, 1938, p. C1.
- Los Angeles Times, "Troupe Treks To Modesto Location", November 11, 1938, p. 10.
- Los Angeles Times, "Jap Treachery Background of Screen Drama", September 11, 1943, p. 7.
