= Virginia Welles =

American actress (1925–2002)

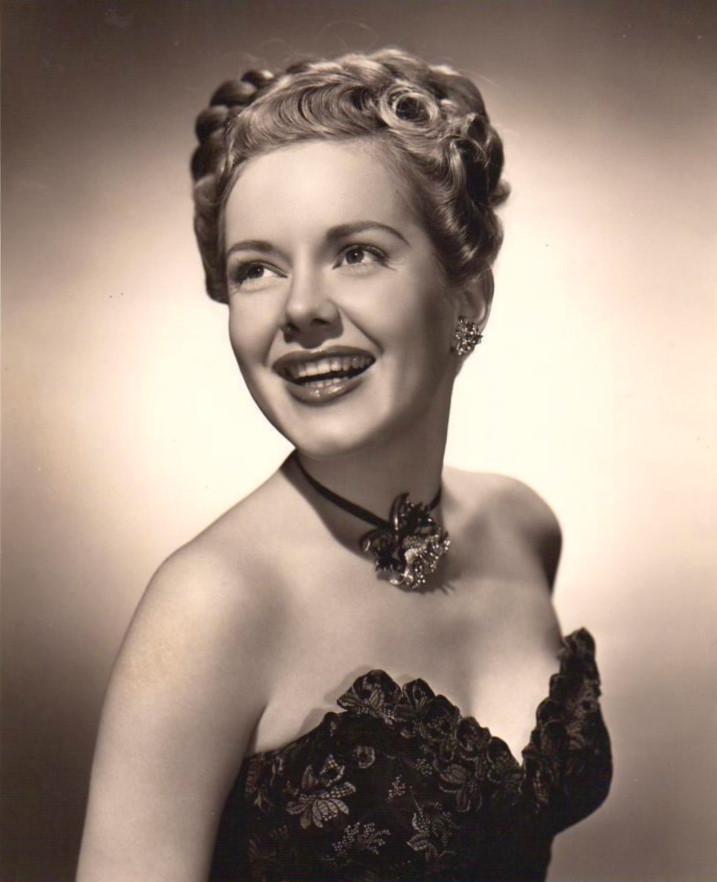
- Wells in a 1946 portrait for Ladies' Man
- Born: Virginia Francine Welter; June 25, 1925; Wausau, Wisconsin, U.S.
- Died: September 19, 2002 (aged 77); Rancho Mirage, California, U.S.
- Occupation: Actress
- Years active: 1945–1960
- Height: 5 ft 2 in (1.57 m)
- Spouse: Henry George Stix Kuh (m. 1948; div. 1977)
- Children: 2

Virginia Welles (born Virginia Francine Welter; June 25, 1925 – September 19, 2002) was an American film actress. She is known for appearing in Shirley Temple films such as Kiss and Tell (1945) and A Kiss for Corliss (1949).

Welles was found by a talent agent while visiting Hollywood for her sister's wedding, where she was encouraged to do a screen test. Despite the offer, she instead opted to enrol on a college course in dramatics, where she was trained by actress Maude Adams. Upon her return to Hollywood, she signed a contract with Paramount Studios after her screen-test was picked up by agent William Meiklejohn.

She later took a break from the film industry to become a stage actress, before taking a hiatus from show business to raise a family. She returned several years later to star in Francis in the Haunted House opposite Mickey Rooney in 1956.

Welles died in September 2002 and was survived by her children and grandchildren.

== Early life ==
Welles was born Virginia Francine Welter in Wausau, Wisconsin, to parents Frank and Phylis (née Wheldon) Welter on June 25, 1925. She was the youngest of two daughters, her older sister being Gwendolyn, around two years her senior. She studied dance and piano in Wausau public schools.

Welles was privately educated at Stephens College, where she originally registered for a course in interior decoration. Prior to the term starting, she and her mother visited Hollywood, California, for her sister's wedding. While there, they visited a boxing match to see movie stars and as they left, an assistant director invited Welles to attend an interview the following day with a casting director. Despite receiving an offer of a screen test, she opted instead to complete another year of college and was encouraged to return in a year by the studio.

In 1943, she re-enrolled at Stephens College, studyng drama under the tuition of the renowned actress Maude Adams.

== Career ==
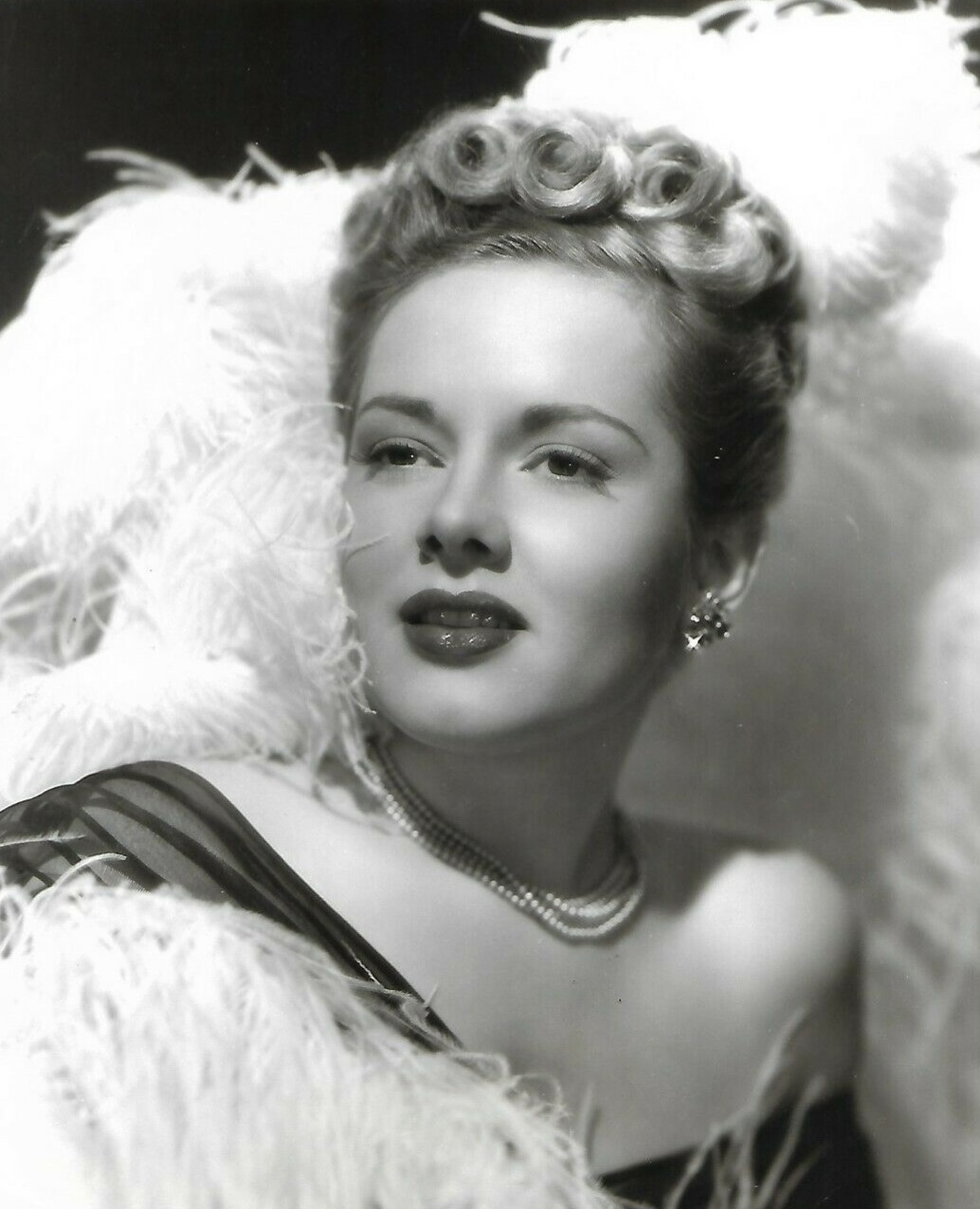
Welles in 1947

After college, Welles returned to Hollywood in June 1945 for a screen test by Warner Brothers, but did not sign a contract. Talent agent William Meiklejohn heard about her test and ran it for the executives of Paramount Studios, who she signed a contract with on August 7, 1945. She became a successful film actress with Paramount, making her film debut in Kiss and Tell in 1945 and then featuring in the 1946 movie To Each His Own.

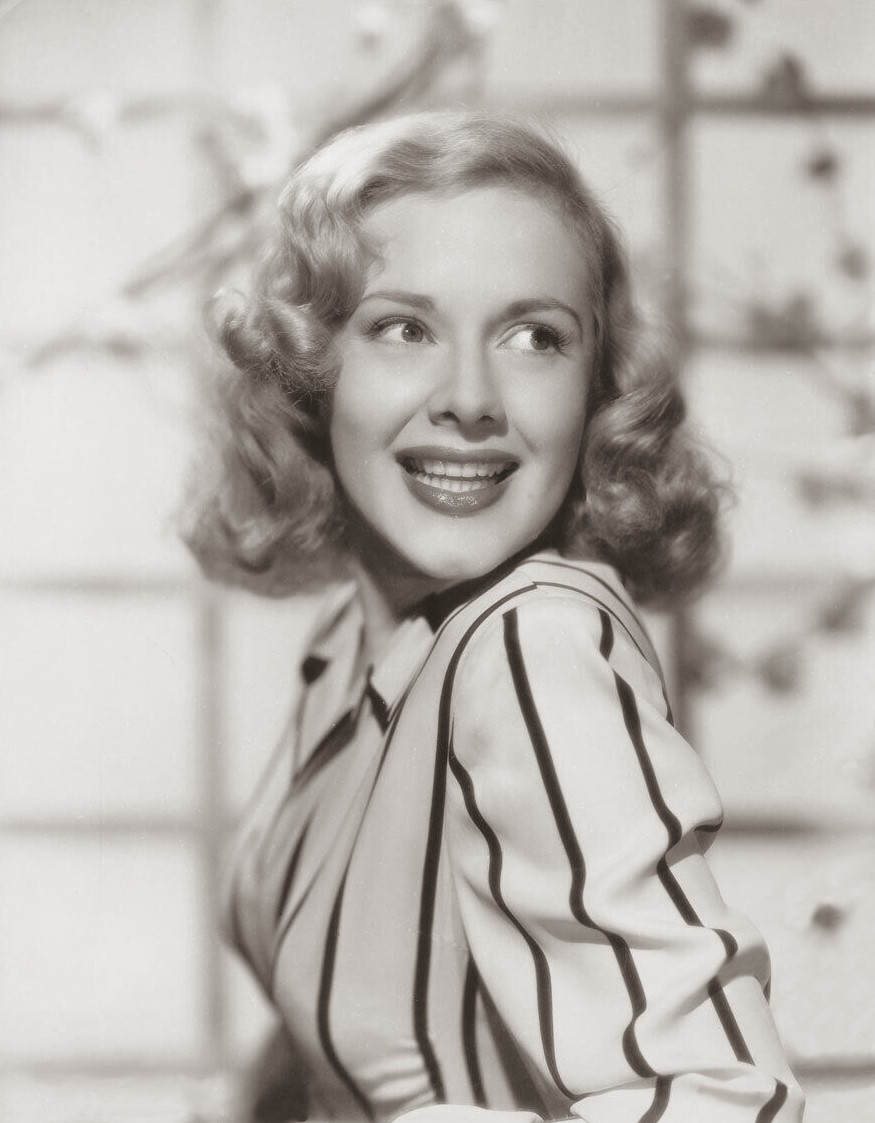
Welles pictured in 1946

Welles made her first visit to New York City in 1947 when filming Ladies' Man, where she learned about expressing dislike towards the New York City Subway. She struggled to adopt the right expression, having been asked to look frantic but told by the director she only looked "mild." She instead opted for wildness, which is how the scene was shot, though she later accepted that the expression used in the film was not right, noting that "people in the subway look dazed."

After starring in numerous films during the 1940s, Welles became a stage actress in San Francisco, California, before leaving show business to dedicate her life to her family and raise her children. During a hiatus of around five years she featured in several movie shorts and on television, but not in any major roles. She returned to the screen in 1956 to star alongside Mickey Rooney in the film Francis in the Haunted House. Welles measured 5 feet 2 inches (157 cm) tall, and in an interview upon her return to films, she revealed the challenges she faced when working opposite tall leading men, saying she would get cracks in her back from looking up and feel fragile during romantic scenes. The only leading man who was shorter than her in one of her films was Eddie Bracken in Ladies′ Man.

== Personal life ==
Welles married insurance salesman Henry Kuh in September 1948 and with him had a son, Henry and a daughter, Patricia (Patsy). They divorced in February 1977.

Welles's daughter was severely injured in a car accident in 1972 and Welles devoted the remaining 30 years of her life to caring for her. Welles enjoyed playing the piano and was a music composer.

=== Death ===
Welles died on September 19, 2002, in Rancho Mirage, California, and was survived by her two children and two grandchildren.

== Filmography ==
- The Mercury Theatre on the Air (1938, 4 episodes)
- Kiss and Tell (1945)
- Hollywood Victory Caravan (1945)
- To Each His Own (1946)
- Ladies' Man (1947)
- Dear Ruth (1947)
- Variety Girl (1947)
- Dynamite (1949)
- Joe Palooka in the Big Fight (1949)
- Make Believe Ballroom (1949)
- A Kiss for Corliss (1949)
- Square Dance Katy (1950)
- Casa Manana (1951)
- The Bigelow Theatre (1951, TV series)
- Studio 57 (1955, TV series)
- Francis in the Haunted House (1956)
- Dr. Christian (1957, TV series)
- New Comedy Showcase (1960, TV series)
