= Ladies' Man (1947 film) =

1947 film by William D. Russell

- Theatrical release poster
- Directed by: William D. Russell
- Screenplay by: Edmund Beloin; Jack Rose; Lewis Meltzer
- Produced by: Daniel Dare
- Starring: Eddie Bracken; Cass Daley; Virginia Welles; Virginia Field
- Cinematography: Stuart Thompson
- Edited by: Everett Douglas; Doane Harrison
- Music by: Irvin Talbot
- Production company: Paramount Pictures
- Distributed by: Paramount Pictures
- Release date: February 7, 1947
- Running time: 91 minutes
- Country: United States
- Language: English

Ladies' Man is a 1947 American comedy film directed by William D. Russell and starring Eddie Bracken, Cass Daley, Virginia Welles and Virginia Field. The screenplay was written by Edmund Beloin, Jack Rose and Lewis Meltzer. The film was released on February 7, 1947, by Paramount Pictures.

== Plot ==
Henry Haskell, the owner of a small farm in rural Oklahoma becomes, an overnight millionaire when oil is discovered on his property. He heads to New York to fulfil a long-held ambition to see the sights. The wealthy and unworldly Henry soon attracts the attention of female fortune hunters. This only increases when his wealth and unmarried status are broadcast on a radio programme.

== Cast ==
- Eddie Bracken as Henry Haskell
- Cass Daley as Geraldine Ryan
- Virginia Welles as Jean Mitchell
- Spike Jones as Spike Jones
- Johnny Coy as Johnny O'Connor
- Virginia Field as Gladys Hayden
- Lewis Russell as David Harmon
- Georges Renavent as Mr. Jones
- Roberta Jonay as Miss Miller
- Gordon Richards as Mr. Bolton
- The City Slickers as Spike Jones' Band

== Reception ==
A. W. of The New York Times said, "Whatever may be one's opinion about Ladies Man, it cannot be said that Eddie Bracken, its star, is miscast. For this singularly simple little item from Paramount, which began a stand at the Gotham on Saturday, makes full use of Mr. Bracken's cherubic appearance. As a bumpkin from Badger, Okla., who suddenly becomes an oil millionaire and comes to New York for the inevitable fling, Mr. Bracken is to the manner born. He is a reluctant Romeo—shy, gullible and frustrated. But the ensuing yarn about his involvements with a radio program and several predatory females, is corn from the bottom of the crib. The chuckles in this comedy are widely spaced and hardly keep pace with its tedium."
