= The Ghosts of Buxley Hall =

- Genre: Comedy; Fantasy
- Written by: Sy Gomberg; Rick Mittleman
- Directed by: Bruce Bilson
- Starring: Dick O'Neill; Victor French; Louise Latham; Monte Markham; Ruta Lee
- Music by: Frank De Vol
- Country of origin: United States
- Original language: English

Production
- Executive producer: William Robert Yates
- Producer: Jerome Courtland
- Cinematography: Leonard J. South
- Editor: Norman R. Palmer
- Running time: 120 minutes
- Production company: Walt Disney Productions

Original release
- Network: NBC
- Release: December 21 – December 28, 1980

The Ghosts of Buxley Hall is a 1980 American made-for-television fantasy-comedy film produced by Walt Disney Productions, directed by Bruce Bilson and starring Dick O'Neill, Victor French, Louise Latham and Monte Markham. It was originally broadcast as a two-part episode of Disney's Wonderful World on December 21 and December 28, 1980.

The Ghosts of Buxley Hall was filmed on location at Banning House in the Wilmington section of Los Angeles, California.

== Synopsis ==
When the 100-year-old Buxley Military Academy falls on hard financial times and is forced to merge with a school for girls, the academy's resident ghosts – General Eulace C. Buxley, Bettina Buxley and Sergeant Major Chester B. Sweet – are aggrieved and aroused from their sleep to seek justice. Outraged by this disrespect of tradition, the spirits are further appalled by a modern world of equal rights for women and rock 'n' roll, as well as the dishonest designs a wealthy matron has for the school. The ghost trio declares war on the living who are involved in their own battle of the sexes.

== Cast ==
- Dick O'Neill as General Eulace C. Buxley
- Victor French as Sergeant Major Chester B. Sweet
- Louise Latham as Bettina Buxley
- Rad Daly as Jeremy Ross
- Monte Markham as Colonel Joe Buxley
- Ruta Lee as Ernestine Di Gonzini
- Vito Scotti as Count Sergio Luchesi Di Gonzini
- Don Porter as Judge Oliver Haynes
- Steve Franken as Virgil Quinby
- Renne Jarrett as Emily Wakefield
- Christian Juttner as Cadet Captain Hubert Fletcher
- Tricia Cast as Posie Taylor
- Guy Raymond as Ben Grissom
- John Myhers as E.L. Hart
- Joe Tornatore as Vincent
- Stu Gilliam as Lt. Jim Rodney
- John Ericson as George Ross
- Tony Becker as Todd
- Karyn Harrison as Waitress
- Billy Jacoby as David Williams

== Production ==
On April 5, 1981, a little over four months after the December broadcast of The Ghosts of Buxley Hall, director Bruce Bilson married one of the film's co-stars, Renne Jarrett.

== Release ==
The Ghosts of Buxley Hall was released on VHS by Walt Disney Home Video in the 1980s. On September 18, 2012, it was released on DVD as a Disney Movie Club Exclusive, available only to club members for mail or online ordering.

== Broadcast ==
Turner Classic Movies presented The Ghosts of Buxley Hall on October 28, 2015, as part of its "Treasures From the Disney Vault" combined with a "Salute to Halloween". Shown before "The Ghosts of Buxley Hall" were The Three Little Pigs (1933), The Big Bad Wolf (1934), Three Little Wolves (1936), The Adventures of Ichabod and Mr. Toad (1949), The Old Mill (1937), "The Plausible Impossible" (1956), Escape to Witch Mountain (1975), Lonesome Ghosts (1937), Frankenweenie (1984) and Mr. Boogedy (1986). Following "The Ghosts of Buxley Hall", the Disney-Halloween salute concluded with Return from Witch Mountain (1978).
