= Sunny Side of the Street (film) =

1951 film by Richard Quine

- Theatrical release poster
- Directed by: Richard Quine
- Written by: Harold Conrad
- Screenplay by: Lee Loeb
- Based on: story by Harold Conrad
- Produced by: Jonie Taps
- Starring: Frankie Laine; Billy Daniels; Terry Moore
- Cinematography: Ellis W. Carter
- Edited by: Jerome Thoms
- Music by: George Duning
- Distributed by: Columbia Pictures
- Release date: September 1951
- Running time: 71 minutes
- Country: United States
- Language: English

Sunny Side of the Street is a 1951 American comedy film directed by Richard Quine and starring Frankie Laine and Billy Daniels.

== Plot ==
Betty Holloway, a receptionist at a major television station, hopes to secure a break for her singer boyfriend Ted Mason and enlists the aid of singer Frankie Laine. Mason's career is boosted when a team of television writers discover that he is the childhood sweetheart of Gloria Pelly, the daughter of an important sponsor.

== Cast ==
- Frankie Laine as himself
- Billy Daniels as himself
- Terry Moore as Betty Holloway
- Jerome Courtland as Ted Mason
- Toni Arden as herself
- Lynn Bari as Mary
- Audrey Long as Gloria Pelley
- Dick Wesson as Dave Gibson
- William Tracy as Al Little
- Willard Waterman as John 'J.R.' Stevens
- Jonathan Hale as Cyrus Pelley
- Amanda Blake as Susie Manning
- Benny Payne as Benny
