= Carol Brewster =

American actress and model (1927–2013)

- Born: Miriam Elizabeth Hechler; February 25, 1927; Los Angeles, California, U.S.
- Died: February 1, 2013 (aged 85); Big Bear Lake, California, U.S.
- Occupations: Actress, model
- Years active: 1949–1970
- Height: 1.7 m (5 ft 7 in)
- Spouse(s): Arne J. Gerritsen, Chester Gray

Carol Brewster (born Miriam Elizabeth Hechler; February 25, 1927 – February 1, 2013) was an American actress and model.

== Biography ==
After she had a role as a model in a Ziegfeld Follies film, Brewster's first acting role came in The Barkleys of Broadway (1949).

In 1955, Brewster came down with polio, causing her to spend 29 days in an iron lung and nine months in a wheel chair. In 1957, she acted on stage in Los Angeles, with a starring role in The Darling Darlinis at the Ivar Theater.

During a hiatus in her acting career, Brewster began designing purses, an endeavor that grew into a business that had 10 employees.

== Death ==
Brewster died at 85 in Big Bear Lake, California on February 1, 2013.

== Filmography ==
- It's a Great Feeling (1949)
- The Barkleys of Broadway (1949)
- Flamingo Road (1949)
- The Girl from Jones Beach (1949)
- A Life of Her Own (1950)
- Two Tickets to Broadway (1951)
- Casa Manana (1951)
- The Belle of New York (1952)
- Untamed Women (1952)
- Cat-Women of the Moon (1953)
- The Maverick Queen (1955)
- Son of Sinbad (1955)
- Police Nurse (1963)
- The Alfred Hitchcock Hour: "Night Fever" (1965) (TV)
- Branded: "A Proud Town" (1965) (TV)
- Death Valley Days: "Fighting Sky Pilot" with Skip Homeier (1965) (TV)
- Perry Mason: "The Case of the Vanishing Victim" (1966) (TV)
- Rosemary's Baby (1968)
- Hell's Bloody Devils (1970)
