= This Happy Feeling =

1958 film by Blake Edwards

- Theatrical release poster
- Directed by: Blake Edwards
- Screenplay by: Blake Edwards
- Based on: For Love or Money; 1947 play by F. Hugh Herbert
- Produced by: Ross Hunter
- Starring: Debbie Reynolds; Curt Jürgens; John Saxon; Alexis Smith; Mary Astor; Estelle Winwood
- Cinematography: Arthur E. Arling
- Edited by: Milton Carruth
- Music by: Frank Skinner
- Distributed by: Universal-International
- Release date: June 18, 1958
- Running time: 92 minutes
- Country: United States
- Language: English
- Box office: $1.4 million

This Happy Feeling is a 1958 American romantic comedy film written and directed by Blake Edwards, adapted from the 1947 F. Hugh Herbert play For Love or Money.

Edwards regretted Universal-International's eleventh hour decision of a name change, but the studio was hoping to trade off another pop hit by Debbie Reynolds as they had with Tammy and the Bachelor. Reynolds stars, along with John Saxon, Curt Jurgens and veteran Hollywood actresses Alexis Smith and Mary Astor.

== Plot ==
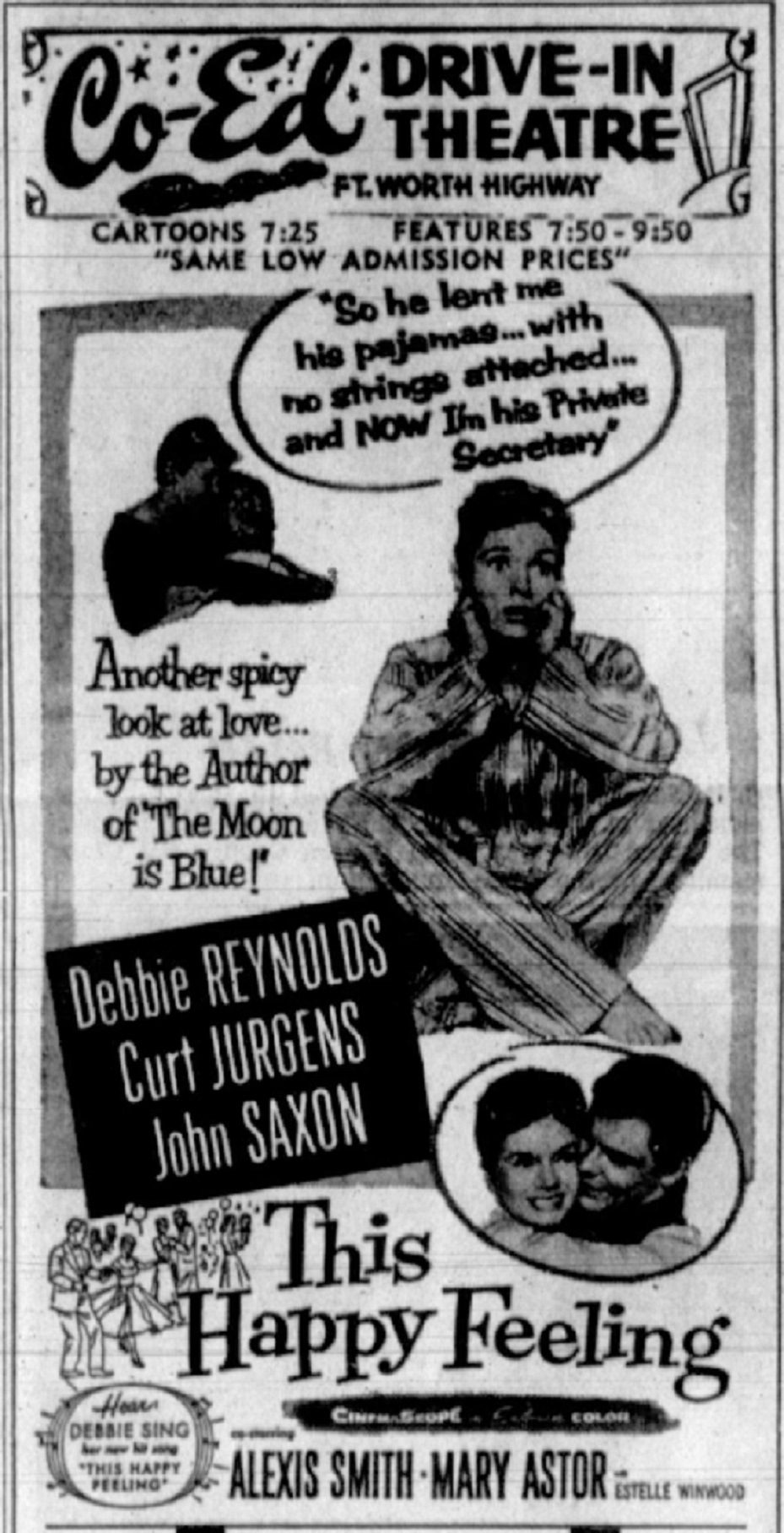
Drive-in advertisement from 1958

Nita Holloway, a woman romantically involved with veteran actor Preston "Mitch" Mitchell, tries to persuade him to come out of retirement to appear in a Broadway play as the father of a character played by a new teen idol, Tony Manza. At his Connecticut farm, next-door neighbor Bill Tremaine asks to borrow Mitch's car. He goes to a party and meets secretary Janet Blake, who is trying to escape the clutches of her drunken boss, dentist Dr. McCafferty. Bill offers her a ride home in a rainstorm, but is a little too attentive to her liking.

Soaked to the skin, Janet ends up knocking on Mitch's door. He permits her to spend the night while her dress dries. Nita arrives in the morning and mistakenly concludes an affair is taking place, and soon others assume the same. Mitch puts her on a train but also offers Janet a job as his own secretary. As the train leaves, he stumbles, injuring his back.

Bill isn't worried at first because Mitch is too austere and somber for Janet, however he comes to realize that she's coming to care for him profoundly and is indeed falling dearly in love with Mitch a little more every day. Scheduled to ride Mitch's star horse in an equine contest, Bill jealously decides to ride another entry instead. Mitch must compete against him, bad back and all.

Although he feels great affection towards her, Mitch ultimately realizes that he feels for Nita most. He goes to Nita to reveal where his heart really lies, and is last seen on stage in the new Broadway play.

== Cast ==
- Debbie Reynolds as Janet Blake
- Curd Jürgens as Preston "Mitch" Mitchell
- John Saxon as Bill Tremaine
- Alexis Smith as Nita Hollaway
- Mary Astor as Mrs. Tremaine
- Estelle Winwood as Mrs. Early
- Troy Donahue as Tony Manza
- Hayden Rorke as Mr. Booth
- Gloria Holden as Mrs. Dover
- Alex Gerry as Mr. Dover
- Joe Flynn as Dr. McCafferty

== Production ==
John Saxon was cast after his success in Rock, Pretty Baby.

== Reception ==
Variety called the film "a delightful comedy".

== See also ==
- List of American films of 1958
