= Vicki Cummings =

American actress (1914–1969)

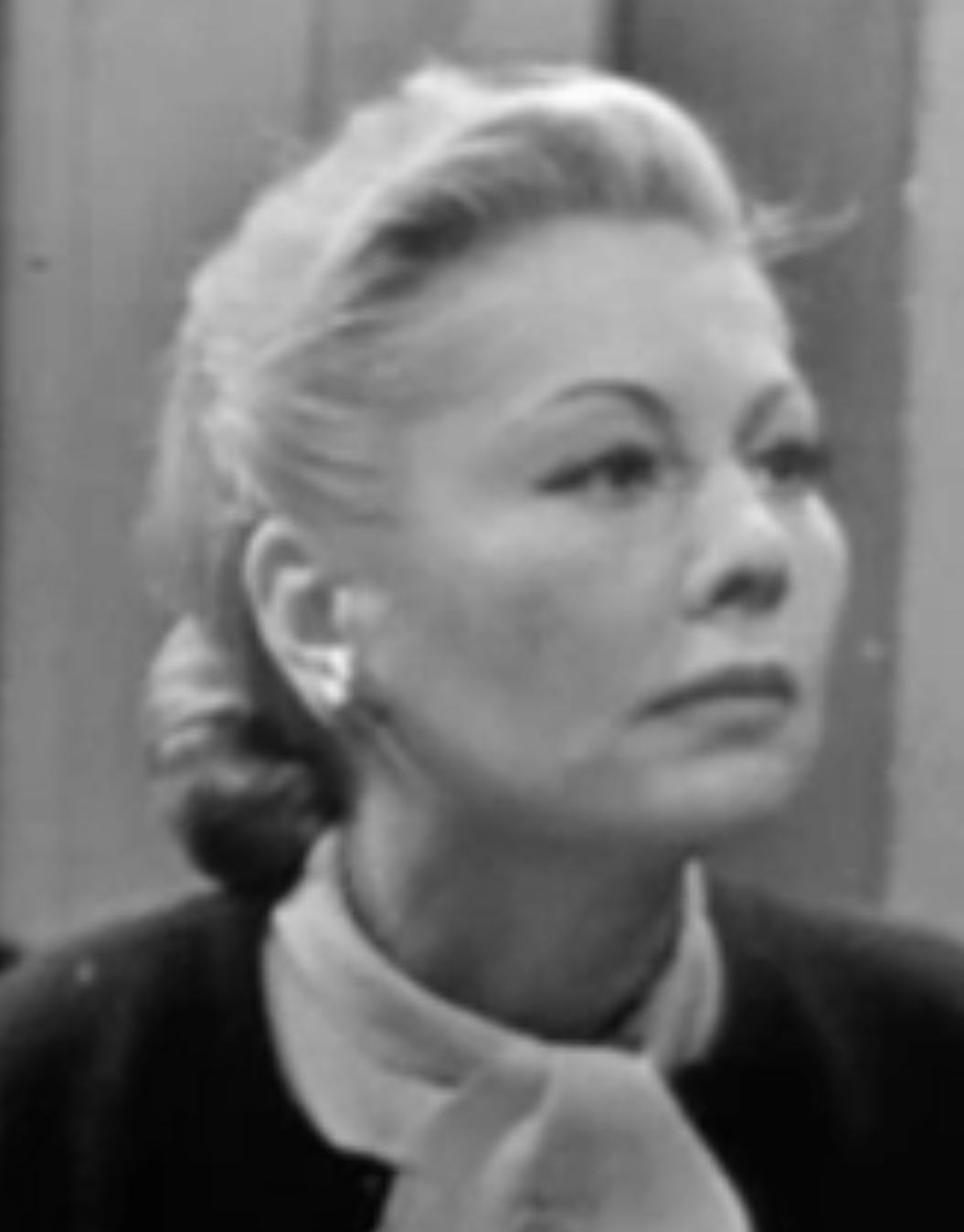
- Cummings in an episode of Tales of Tomorrow (1952)
- Born: February 15, 1914; Northampton, Massachusetts, U.S.
- Died: November 30, 1969 (aged 55); New York City, U.S.
- Other name: Vickie Charles
- Occupation: Actress
- Years active: 1931–1962
- Spouse: William Gibberson (m. 1948)

Vicki Cummings (February 15, 1914 – November 30, 1969) was an American musical comedy actress whose depictions of "sophisticated, sharp-tongued women" were praised by critics. She was billed as Vickie Charles for a while in the 1940s. Her obituary in Time magazine said that Cummings was "noted for her sardonic wit" and that "On and off the stage, she had a voice as brassy as Ethel Merman's and a tongue as agile as Dorothy Parker's".

== Early years ==
Cummings was born in Northampton, Massachusetts, on February 15, 1914. She described herself as "a very imaginative child" who dreamed of being a princess in fairy tales. She added, "My abilities just seemed to lie in the direction of the stage."

== Career ==
Cummings's New York stage debut came in Here Goes the Bride (1931). Peter Arno, a friend of her family, talked her into taking an understudy role for that production, but she ended up playing the lead. After that experience, she took lessons in acting, dancing, and singing because she wanted to be more involved with the theater. In 1935 Cummings had the prima donna role in the Pacific Coast production of Anything Goes. She also performed at the Muny Opera in Gentlemen Unafraid and Wild Violets.

Cummings's Broadway credits include Furnished Rooms (1934), Orchids Preferred (1937), The Time, the Place and the Girl (1942), The Voice of the Turtle (1943), Mrs. Kimball Presents (1944), Lady in Danger (1945), For Love or Money (1947), Oh, Mr. Meadowbrook! (1948), Mr. Barry's Etchings (1950), A Phoenix Too Frequent / Freight (1950), Buy Me Blue Ribbons (1951), Hook n' Ladder (1952), I've Got Sixpence (1952), Mid-Summer (1953), Lunatics and Lovers (1954), The Hot Corner (1956), and How to Make a Man (1961). Billed as Vicki Charles, she was in Sunny River (1941).

Cumming's radio debut occurred on station KPO in San Francisco on July 30, 1935. She later appeared on Theatre Guild on the Air and other shows. She performed on more than 200 television programs, including The Silver Theatre, Ford Theatre, Leave It to the Girls, Holiday Hotel, Robert Montgomery Presents. and Television Playhouse.

== Critical response ==
Critics' comments about Cummings's performances included the following:

- A review of the Broadway production of Buy Me Blue Ribbons in Time named Cummings as one of "three talented comediennes" in the show.
- The Toronto Star said of Cummings's performance in Noël Coward's Blithe Spirit, "Vicki Cummings as wife No. 2 is the essence of Coward invention in dialogue and acting."
- Charles Gentry wrote in the Detroit Times that Cummings was "a brilliant comedian" in a production of Lady in Danger.
- Jay Carmody, in The Sunday Star, described Cummings as "the most dynamic actress in the summer theater. Or perhaps in the theater of the three other seasons as well."

== Personal life and death ==
Cummings married actor William Gibberson in 1948. She died on November 30, 1969, in her apartment in New York City.

== Recognition ==
Cummings received the Aegis Club's Best Supporting Actress Award in 1953 as a result of her work in Mid-Summer.

== Papers ==
Cummings's papers are at the New York Public Library. The archive includes clippings, photographs, programs, and other documents related to her career.
