= When You're Smiling (film) =

1950 film by Joseph Santley

- Theatrical release poster
- Directed by: Joseph Santley
- Written by: Karen DeWolf; Jack Roberts
- Produced by: Jonie Taps
- Starring: Jerome Courtland; Frankie Laine; Lola Albright
- Cinematography: Vincent J. Farrar
- Edited by: Edwin H. Bryant
- Music by: George Duning
- Production company: Columbia Pictures
- Distributed by: Columbia Pictures
- Release date: August 30, 1950
- Running time: 75 minutes
- Country: United States
- Language: English

When You're Smiling is a 1950 American musical film directed by Joseph Santley and starring Jerome Courtland, Frankie Laine and Lola Albright.

== Cast ==
- Jerome Courtland as Gerald Durham
- Frankie Laine as Frankie Laine
- Billy Daniels as Billy Daniels
- Lola Albright as Peggy Martin
- Jerome Cowan as Herbert Reynolds
- Margo Woode as Linda Reynolds
- Collette Lyons as Nan Doran
- Robert Shayne as Jack Lacey
- Don Otis as Don Otis
- Ray Teal as Steve
- Jimmy Lloyd as Dave
- Donna Hamilton as Margie
- Edward Earle as Foster
- Frank Nelson as Jeweler
- Neyle Morrow as Carlo

== Bibliography ==
- Michael L. Stephens. Art Directors in Cinema: A Worldwide Biographical Dictionary. McFarland, 1998.
