= Make Believe Ballroom (film) =

1949 film by Joseph Santley

- Directed by: Joseph Santley
- Screenplay by: Albert Duffy; Karen DeWolf
- Story by: Albert Duffy
- Produced by: Ted Richmond
- Starring: Jerome Courtland; Ruth Warrick; Ron Randell; Virginia Welles; Al Jarvis
- Cinematography: Henry Freulich
- Edited by: Jerome Thoms
- Production company: Columbia Pictures
- Distributed by: Columbia Pictures
- Release date: April 1, 1949
- Running time: 79 minutes
- Country: United States
- Language: English

Make Believe Ballroom is a 1949 American musical romantic comedy directed by Joseph Santley and produced by Ted Richmond. It was loosely based on the radio program of the same name hosted by Martin Block and Al Jarvis. The film starred Jerome Courtland, Ruth Warrick, Ron Randell, Virginia Welles, and Jarvis. The film featured musical icons of the era such as Jimmy Dorsey, Gene Krupa, and Charlie Barnet.

== Plot ==
The film focuses on two carhops as they compete in a mystery record contest. John Reid, in the reference book Popular Pictures of the Hollywood 1940s, commented, "... this is one of those films which string together a musical melange through the excuse of a radio show."

== Music ==
The film features iconic bandleaders of the big band era in a performance of "Joshua Fit the Battle of Jericho" by the combined bands of Jimmy Dorsey, Gene Krupa, Charlie Barnet, Ray McKinley, Pee Wee Hunt, and Jan Garber. Gene Krupa performs his classic "Disco Jockey Jump" and Frankie Laine performs "On the Sunny Side of the Street". The title song is co-written by Johnny Mercer.

== Cast ==
- Jerome Courtland as Gene Thomas
- Ruth Warrick as Liza
- Virginia Welles as Josie Marlowe
- Ron Randell as Professor Leslie Todd
- Al Jarvis as himself
- Paul Harvey as George Willcox
- Sid Tomack as Joe
- Louis Jean Heydt as "Jerk" Elliott
- Adele Jergens as herself
- Frank Orth as "Pop"
- Pierre Watkin as radio station manager
- Vernon Dent as chef

Musicians featured as themselves in the film included Jimmy Dorsey, Gene Krupa, Charlie Barnet, Ray McKinley, Frankie Laine, The King Cole Trio, Toni Harper, Jack Smith, Kay Starr, The Sportsmen, Jan Garber, and Pee Wee Hunt.

== Background ==
The film's concept dated back to 1932 and Al Jarvis, a disc jockey at radio station KFWB in Los Angeles, California. His daily program, "The World's Largest Make Believe Ballroom", featured popular recordings accompanied by relevant remarks about each one. In 1935, Martin Block began a similar program on WNEW in New York City, with the title shortened to "Make Believe Ballroom".

Filming started 20 September 1948.

The film marked a return to B pictures at Columbia for Ron Randell.
