= Square Dance Katy =

1950 film directed by Jean Yarbrough

- Theatrical release poster
- Directed by: Jean Yarbrough
- Screenplay by: Warren Wilson
- Produced by: Lindsley Parsons
- Starring: Barbara Jo Allen; Jimmie Davis; Phil Brito; Virginia Welles; Warren Douglas; Sheila Ryan
- Cinematography: William A. Sickner
- Edited by: Ace Herman
- Production company: Monogram Pictures
- Distributed by: Monogram Pictures
- Release date: March 25, 1950
- Running time: 76 minutes
- Country: United States
- Language: English

Square Dance Katy is a 1950 American musical film directed by Jean Yarbrough and written by Warren Wilson. The film stars Barbara Jo Allen, Jimmie Davis, Phil Brito, Virginia Welles, Warren Douglas and Sheila Ryan. The film was released on March 25, 1950 by Monogram Pictures.

== Cast ==
- Barbara Jo Allen as Gypsy Jones
- Jimmie Davis as Jimmie Davis
- Phil Brito as Dodo Dixon
- Virginia Welles as Katy O'Connor
- Warren Douglas as Bob Carson
- Sheila Ryan as Vicky Doran
- Dorothy Vaughan as Ma O'Connor
- Harry Cheshire as Kimbrough
- Fenton Jones as Square-Dance Caller
- Russell Hicks as Commissioner
- Ray Walker as Businessman
- William Forrest as Businessman
- Tris Coffin as Franklin
- Jon Riffel as Taxicab Driver
- Warren Jackson as Fat Man
- Donald Kerr as Waiter
- Paul Bryar as Taxi Driver
- Earle Hodgins as Slick
- Frank Sully as Workman
- Stanley Blystone as Policeman
- Lee Phelps as Court Clerk
- Edward Gargan as Police Officer Casey
- Joseph Crehan as Judge
