= In Search of America =

- Written by: Lewis John Carlino
- Directed by: Paul Bogart
- Starring: Jeff Bridges; Carl Betz; Vera Miles; Ruth McDevitt
- Music by: Fred Myrow
- Country of origin: United States
- Original language: English

Production
- Producer: William Froug
- Cinematography: Fred J. Koenekamp
- Editor: Richard E. Reilly
- Running time: 90 minutes
- Production company: Four Star Television

Original release
- Network: ABC
- Release: March 23, 1971

In Search of America is a 1971 American television pilot directed by Paul Bogart that was broadcast as an ABC Movie of the Week. It features footage of the Sky River Rock Festival.

== Plot ==
Mike Olson tells his family that he intends to leave university in order to discover his sense of purpose by traveling across the United States. He convinces his mother, father and grandmother, but not his sister, to come along with him in a 1920s bus converted into a mobile home. Their first stop is a rock festival where Mike falls in love with the mysterious Kathy who is not what she seems.

== Cast ==
- Jeff Bridges as Mike Olson
- Carl Betz as Ben Olson
- Vera Miles as Jenny Olson
- Ruth McDevitt as Grandma Rose
- Renne Jarrett as Kathy
- Howard Duff as Ray Chandler
- Kim Hunter as Cora Chandler
- Sal Mineo as Nick
- Michael Anderson Jr. as J.J.
- Tyne Daly as Anne
- Glynn Turman as Bodhi
- George D. Wallace as Clarence

== Production ==
Producer William Froug was given ten days to shoot the film. At the last minute, the key element in the screenplay, the death of one of the leads was disapproved by the ABC network.

== Reception ==
The Video Beat reviewed the film in the present day:

(Mike) convinces his family to re-examine their goals and join him on a cross-country odyssey in a 1928 Greyhound bus. Mom, Dad and even Grandma soon begin a mind-blowing adventure discovering America's hippie generation.

The family comes upon a Woodstock-like festival complete with towers and stage announcements. There's lots of footage of real longhaired hippies doing their tribal thing; dancing, grooving, and playing in the mud, at a genuine rock festival. They meet the love generation, including a pregnant hippie who plans to do natural childbirth in her cardboard box house. Sal Mineo is excellent as a hippie biker, stoner burnout. Grandma really gets into it; she wears peace sign earrings.

This film was a pilot for a series that never came to be. Imagine a weekly TV series about an upper-middle class family traveling in a freaked-out bus discovering hippies, acid heads, rock bands, gurus, artists, protesters, bikers and more! It would have been a trip!
