= The Baby Cyclone =

1928 film

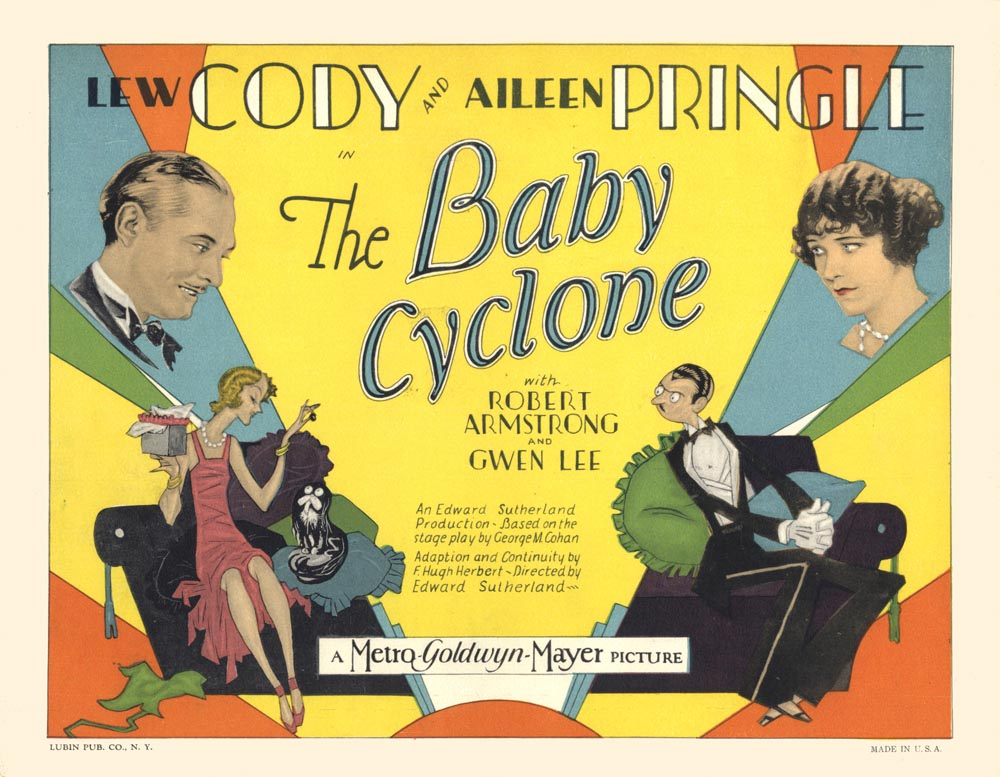
- Directed by: A. Edward Sutherland
- Screenplay by: George M. Cohan (play); F. Hugh Herbert; Robert E. Hopkins
- Produced by: A. Edward Sutherland
- Starring: Lew Cody; Aileen Pringle; Robert Armstrong; Gwen Lee; Nora Cecil
- Cinematography: André Barlatier - (French Wikipedia)
- Edited by: Carl Pierson
- Production company: Metro-Goldwyn-Mayer
- Distributed by: Metro-Goldwyn-Mayer
- Release date: September 27, 1928
- Country: United States
- Languages: Sound (Synchronized) (English Intertitles)

The Baby Cyclone is a lost 1928 American synchronized sound comedy film directed by A. Edward Sutherland and based upon the 1927 play by George M. Cohan, adapted for the screen by F. Hugh Herbert and Robert E. Hopkins. While the film has no audible dialog, it was released with a synchronized musical score with sound effects using the sound-on-film Western Electric Sound System process. The film stars Lew Cody, Aileen Pringle, Robert Armstrong, Gwen Lee and Nora Cecil. The film was released on September 27, 1928, by Metro-Goldwyn-Mayer.

== Plot ==
In "The Baby Cyclone," the title refers not to a child, but to a mischievous little Pekingese dog whose presence wreaks havoc on relationships, homes, and tempers. The story begins when Joe Meadows, a smooth-talking office worker, gives away the dog to Jessie Hurley, a woman he meets through a neighboring office window. Jessie instantly falls in love with the dog and brings it home to her husband, Gene Hurley, as a surprise. Gene, however, is horrified by the yapping little creature and cannot believe Jessie considers the shaggy menace a household pet.

Jessie, completely besotted with the dog she names Cyclone, treats it like a baby, even blaming Gene for letting the dog catch a cold. Gene, desperate to rid himself of the four-legged pest, attempts several ridiculous methods of disposal. His efforts include dropping the dog down a manhole, hoping for a quick solution, but a friendly laborer, Bill, retrieves Cyclone and returns him. In another attempt, Gene tries to leave Cyclone near a tough bulldog outside a restaurant, but even the bulldog flees at the sight of the obnoxious Pekingese.

Eventually, Gene meets Lydia Webster in the park, a fashionable and elegant woman who instantly falls for Cyclone’s supposed charms. He seizes the chance to be rid of the dog and sells him to her for five dollars. Lydia proudly takes Cyclone home and begins treating him like a prized possession. When her fiancé, Joe Meadows, arrives and sees the dog again, he is immediately dismayed. Joe attempts to bathe Cyclone to improve his standing with Lydia, but this results in complete domestic chaos. Slipping on soap, falling into the coal pile, and springing a rat trap, Joe’s attempt ends in disaster. Lydia accuses him of cruelty, insists that he has no sensitivity, and bars him from touching the dog again.

Meanwhile, Jessie discovers that Cyclone is gone and demands that Gene get him back or their marriage is over. Gene, flustered, confesses that he sold the dog to a woman from Chicago and has no way of tracking her down. Their argument escalates into a public shouting match in the street. As fate would have it, Jessie spots Lydia passing by—with Cyclone in her arms. Jessie immediately confronts her, emotionally overwhelmed by the reunion. In a flurry of emotion and bills, Jessie repurchases Cyclone, leaving Lydia stunned and Joe once again embarrassed and battered.

When Lydia discovers the dog is gone, she demands that Joe recover him at any cost. Joe tries to explain that he doesn’t even know where the woman lives, but Lydia insists, accusing him of indifference and betrayal. Though their quarrel is loud and theatrical, it ends in reconciliation as they embrace, with the matter of the dog left unresolved.

The story also features Mrs. Crandall, a proper and fussy older woman who adds to the social friction in Lydia’s world, as well as Lydia’s parents, Mr. Webster and Mrs. Webster, who appear in scenes highlighting Lydia’s upper-class domestic setting and genteel pretensions.

The film ends on a comic note, with Cyclone once again back in Jessie’s arms, the object of obsessive affection and the cause of utter chaos. The men, though exhausted and humiliated, are powerless to challenge the dog’s hold over their wives. Cyclone, ever the center of unwanted attention, lives up to his name, leaving confusion, conflict, and comedic destruction wherever he goes.

== Production ==
In the scene noted above where Joe slips on the soap, the stunt was actually performed by Buster Keaton, who was simply visiting friend Lew Cody on the set. When director Eddie Sutherland was unsatisfied with one stuntman's attempt, Keaton offered to jump in and pull off the dramatic fall. Later when studio executive Irving Thalberg was watching the dailies, he was shocked and annoyed because he assumed his valuable leading man Cody had risked injury doing the stunt. "You must never let Cody do a thing like that," he told Sutherland. "Do you realize the chance you took? Cody could be laid up for weeks!" Without breaking breaking Keaton's cover, all Sutherland could weakly reply was, "Well, he wanted to do it." And then Keaton was paid $7.50 for his secretive walk-on stunt.

== Cast ==
- Lew Cody as Joe Meadows
- Aileen Pringle as Lydia
- Robert Armstrong as Gene
- Gwen Lee as Jessie
- Nora Cecil as Mrs. Crandall
- Fred Esmelton as Mr. Webster
- Clarissa Selwynne as Mrs. Webster
- Wade Boteler as Bill

== See also ==
- List of early sound feature films (1926–1929)
