= Billy Daniels =

American singer (1915–1988)

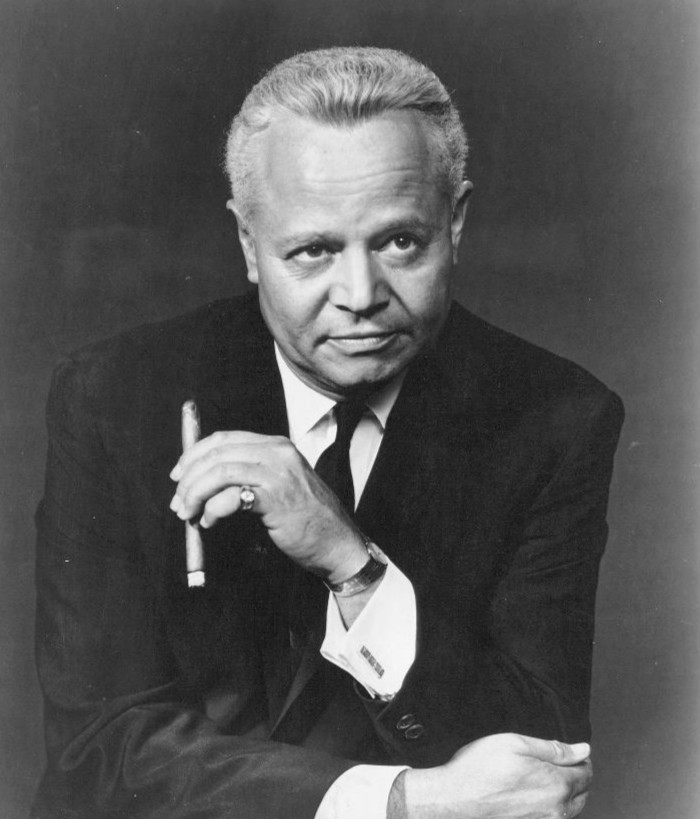
- Daniels in 1966

Background information
- Born: William Boone Daniels; September 12, 1915; Jacksonville, Florida
- Died: October 7, 1988 (aged 73) Los Angeles, California
- Genres: Vocal jazz, cabaret
- Occupations: Singer, actor
- Instrument: Vocals
- Labels: Mercury, Verve
- Formerly of: Ray Vasquez Erskine Hawkins, Charlie Parker
- Website: https://billydanielsfoundation.com

William Boone Daniels (September 12, 1915 – October 7, 1988) was an American singer active in the United States and Europe from the mid-1930s to 1988, notable for his hit recording of "That Old Black Magic" and his pioneering performances on early 1950s television. He was one of the first African-American entertainers to cross over into the mainstream. Daniels was honored with a star on the Hollywood Walk of Fame in 1977.

== Life and career ==
=== Early life ===
Daniels was born in Jacksonville, Florida, United States. where his father was a postmaster and notary. His mother was a schoolteacher and organist. Daniels had a heritage of Portuguese sailor, Native American (Choctaw), African American, and frontiersman Daniel Boone. He studied pre-law at Florida Normal College, but he had to withdraw to help provide support for his parents.

=== Early career ===
In 1935, Daniels moved from Jacksonville to New York to attend Columbia University. He planned to become a lawyer, but he was sidetracked during the Depression. His grandmother was a seamstress in Harlem for the Ziegfeld Follies, and she encouraged her grandson to sing at Dickie Wells, the club where he first worked as a dishwasher, then a singing waiter. There he was discovered by bandleader Erskine Hawkins, who hired him as a featured vocalist.

Daniels had several accompanists, including Nat Cole, while in New York. In 1948, he teamed with ex-big-band pianist Benny Payne, who had been Cab Calloway's pianist in the Cotton Club. Payne remained as accompanist for the rest of Daniels's career.

=== "That Old Black Magic" ===
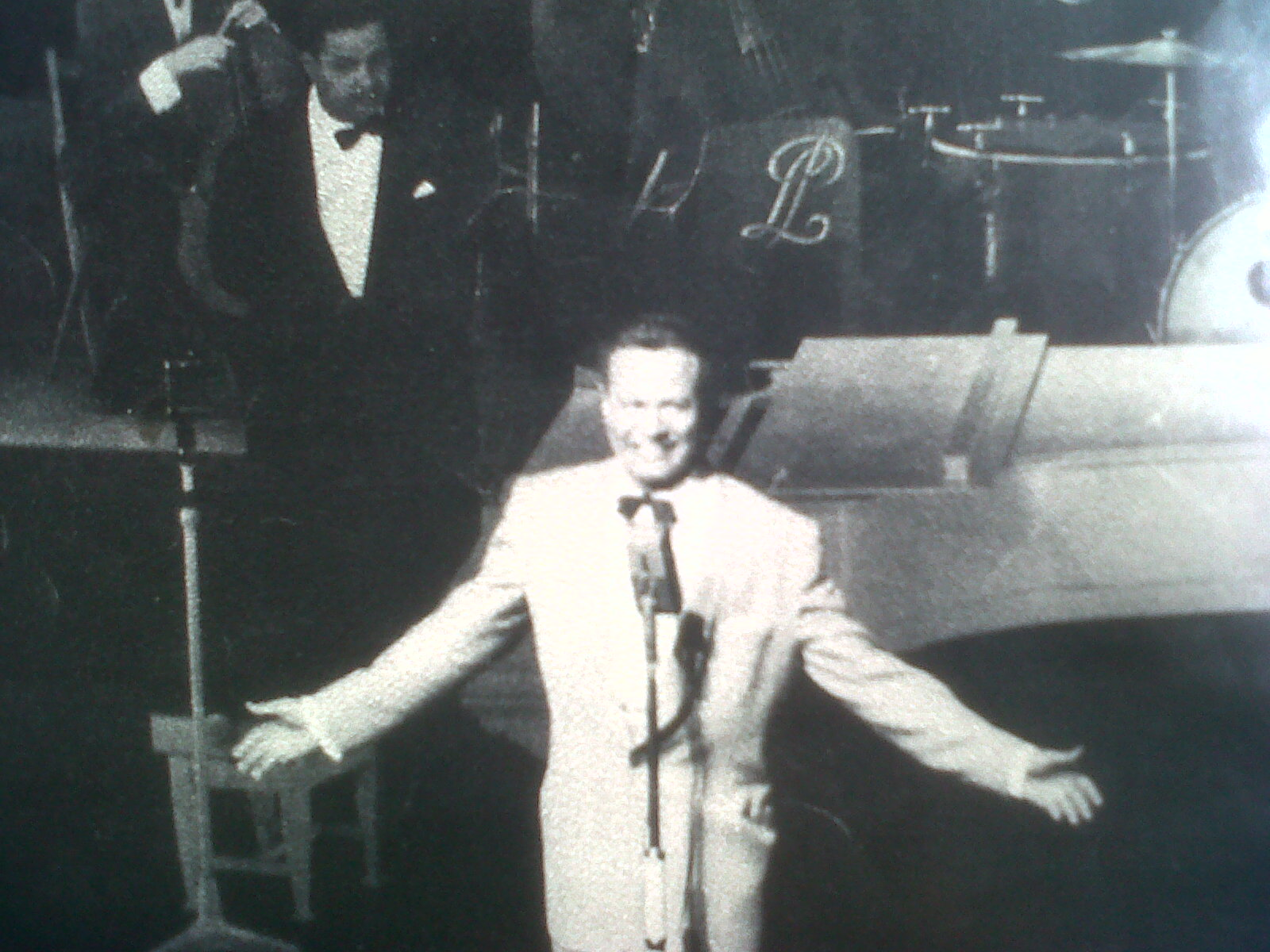
Billy Daniels and Benny Payne during their first London Palladium show in 1952.

Daniels' first trademark song from his time on New York radio was the song "Diane," which he recorded on Bluebird in 1941. His later signature song was "That Old Black Magic", by Harold Arlen and Johnny Mercer, which Daniels first recorded for Apollo Records in 1948. His 1950 recording on Mercury became a hit, selling in the millions.

=== Broadway ===
Daniels had performed in musicals on Broadway early in his career with a minor role in a short-lived musical, Memphis Bound (1945). More notable was the long run (700+ performances) of Golden Boy with Sammy Davis Jr. in 1964, directed by Arthur Penn. Daniels toured the US in 1975 with Pearl Bailey in the all-black Hello, Dolly!, and in London's West End, he headlined a 1978 presentation of Bubbling Brown Sugar. He was popular in Australia where he first toured with the Andrews Sisters in 1954.

=== Films and television ===
Daniels was a pioneer in television with his own television series that debuted on ABC on October 12, 1952. The Billy Daniels Show was sponsored by Rybutol, a popular vitamin tablet at the time. This 15-minute show, telecast from WJZ-TV in New York on Sunday evenings from what was later to become The Ed Sullivan Theater (and now The Late Show) was a milestone: the first sponsored network television series starring a black performer. He appeared on television in the US and UK and Australia and Canada throughout the 1950s and 1960s with performances on The Milton Berle Show and 'The Ed Sullivan Show.

His films include When You're Smiling (Columbia, 1950) Sunny Side of the Street (Columbia 1951) and Columbia's Rainbow 'Round My Shoulder (Columbia, 1952).

In the original script for the movie Goodfellas (working title: "Wiseguys") the narration of the character Karen Hill was to include, "One night, Billy Daniels sent us champagne. There was nothing like it." However, in the final version of the movie, the name was changed to Bobby Vinton.

=== Later recording career ===
Daniels' recordings cover the period of transition from 78-rpm to the dawn of microgroove recording. Remembered mostly for his charismatic live performances, he made an album at Abbey Road, The Magic of Billy Daniels (1978), which contained a disco version of "That Old Black Magic." He recorded one of the first soul records, "Woe Woe Woe", a now rare recording.

== Personal life ==
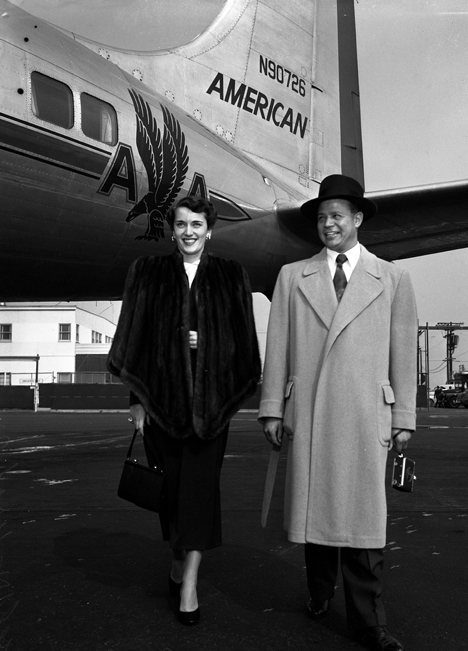
Billy Daniels and Martha Braun Daniels at the Los Angeles airport in 1950.

=== Marriage and children ===
Daniels was married four times: Gladys Gordan (divorced 1940); Florence Clotworthy (died 1947); Martha Braun (divorced); and Pierrette Cameron (until his death).

Daniels and Gladys Gordan had one child, Yvonne Daniels. He had three children with his second wife Florence Clotworthy: Diane, Billy Jr, and Bruce. Clotworthy died in 1947. In 1950, Daniels married socialite Martha Braun. Braun filed for divorce in Juarez, Mexico, citing mental cruelty. He did not contest the action. After the divorce Daniels married Pierette Cameron, whom he hired as governess for his children. Pierrette had two daughters with Daniels: Andrea and Dominique.

Pierrette H. Daniels, Daniels' widow (deceased 2011), and their daughter Dominique Daniels founded a 501(c)(3) non-profit organization, the Billy Daniels Foundation, raising money for underserved youths seeking Arts Education support in her late husband's name. Dominique Daniels, is Chief Executive Officer of the Billy Daniels Foundation.

=== Health ===
Daniels had heart-bypass surgery twice, first in 1982 and then five years later in 1987. He carried on performing in the summer of 1988 but in August 1988, he checked into the Scripps Clinic in San Diego where it was discovered that he had a bleeding ulcer and inoperable stomach cancer.

== Death ==
Daniels died on October 7, 1988, from stomach cancer at the age of 73 at the Kenneth Norris Cancer Hospital in Los Angeles, California. He is buried at the El Camino Memorial Park in Sorrento Valley, San Diego, California.

== Discography ==
- 1952 You Go to My Head (Mercury)
- 1954 Love Me or Leave Me (Mercury MG-20047)
- 1957 You Go to My Head (Verve)
- 1958 The Masculine Touch (Verve)
- 1960 Touch of Your Lips (Pickwick)
- 1963 Love Songs For A Fool (Wing)
- 1970 New Black Magic (King)
- 1978 The Magic Of Billy Daniels (Music For Pleasure)
- 1993 Billy Daniels at the Crescendo (GNP)
- 2001 Mr. Black Magic (GNP/Crescendo)
- 2003 Around Midnight (Sepia Records)
- 2004 The Legendary Billy Daniels (Sepia Records)

=== Filmography ===
- 1948 Sepia Cinderella
- 1950 When You're Smiling
- 1951 Rainbow 'Round My Shoulder
- 1952 Sunny Side of the Street
- 1959 Night of the Quarter Moon
- 1959 The Beat Generation
- 1959 The Big Operator
- 2009 That Old Black Magic (Arkadia Jazz DVD)
