= Renne Jarrett =

American actress

Renne Gail Jarrett (born January 28, 1946) is an American actress. She appeared in TV dramas beginning as a child. Notable TV roles included the title role in the short-lived NBC comedy Nancy. Jarrett has made more than 100 commercials, and has also performed on Broadway.

== Early years ==
Born in Manhattan, Jarrett is the daughter of Barbara and Robert E. Jarrett. Her father managed mutual funds, and her mother managed Jarrett's career. She and her two younger sisters, were child actors and models. She is a graduate of the Nightingale-Bamford School, and she attended Northwestern University. She was a debutante in 1963 and was a member of the Junior League.

== Career ==
By age eight, Jarrett had appeared more than 25 times on dramatic television programs, including Studio One and was a regular on the daytime drama Portia Faces Life. She created the role of Eileen McCallion on Love of Life and acted on The Edge of Night and The Secret Storm. She had the title role as the daughter of a U.S. president in the NBC situation comedy Nancy (1970-1971). She also made more than 100 commercials for products that included Colgate 100, Reynolds Wrap, and Scotch Tape.

On Broadway, Jarrett portrayed Rita Flannigan in The Loud Red Patrick (1956) and a maid in Giants, Sons of Giants (1962).

== Personal life ==
On September 11, 1971, Jarrett married actor John Rothery Stauffer in Manhattan.

== Filmography ==
=== Film ===
Year	Film	Role	Notes
1953	To My Valentine		TV film
1971	In Search of America	Kathy	ABC Movie of the Week
1973	The Cat Creature	Sherry Hastings	ABC Movie of the Week
1974	The Family Kovack	Jill	TV film
1975	The First 36 Hours of Dr. Durant	Dr. Lynn Peterson	ABC Movie of the Week
1976	The New Daughters of Joshua Cabe	Ada	TV film
1979	When Hell Was in Session	Nancy Tschudy	TV film
1980	The Ghosts of Buxley Hall	Emily Wakefield	TV film

=== Television ===
Year	Title	Role	Notes
1954	The Inner Flame	Shirley Manning	1 episode
1965	The Patty Duke Show	Girl in audience	Episode: "Patty Meets a Celebrity"
1967	The Edge of Night	Phoebe Smith	2 episodes
1969	Love of Life	Eileen McCallion	1 episode
1969	Then Came Bronson	Sibyl	Episode: "Sibyl"
1970	The Mod Squad	Elizabeth Metcalf	Episode: "The King of Empty Cups"
1970	The High Chaparral	Martha Simmons	Episode: "The Lieutenant"
1970	Medical Center	Vicki Kaufman	Episode: "The Combatants"
1970–1971	Nancy	Nancy Smith Hudson	Title role
1972–1973	Somerset	Ginger Kurtz Cooper	Recurring role
1973	Love, American Style	Jennifer	Episode: "Love and the Secret Spouse"
1973	The ABC Afternoon Playbreak	Alice Laughton	Episode: "I Never Said Goodbye"
1974	The Streets of San Francisco	Kathy Hollander	Episode: "I Ain't Marchin' Anymore"
1974	Barnaby Jones	Gail	Episode: "Death on Deposit"
1975	Barnaby Jones	Allison Clark	Episode: "A Taste for Murder"
1975	Petrocelli	Lois Phillips	Episode: "Once Upon a Victim"
1976	Joe Forrester		Episode: "An Act of Violence"
1976	Ellery Queen	Penny Carroll	Episode: "The Adventure of the Tyrant of Tin Pan Alley"
1976	City of Angels	Sarah	Episode: "Match Point"
1976	Bert D'Angelo/Superstar	Graine Flannagan	Episode: "Flannagan's Fleet"
1977	Most Wanted	Kathy Franklin	Episode: "Ms. Murder"
1977	Quincy, M.E.	Janet Martin	Episode: "Hit and Run at Danny's"
1977	Barnaby Jones	Peggy Landry	Episode: "A Simple Case of Terror"
1979	Barnaby Jones	Claire Boyer	Episode: "Child of Love Child of Vengeance"
1979	B. J. and the Bear	Debbie Hastings	Episode:"Run for the Money"
1980	Disneyland	Emily Wakefield	Episode: "The Ghosts of Buxley Hall"
1980	Archie Bunker's Place	Kathy Wakefield	Episode: "Archie Alone"
1984	Finder of Lost Loves	Janet Warren	Episode: "Old Friends"
1985	Hotel	Liz Maguire	Episode: "Pathways"
