= Kiss and Tell (play) =

1943 Broadway play

- Original language: English
- Written by: F. Hugh Herbert
- Characters: Corliss Archer
- Setting: Back porch of the Archers' home.

Premiere
- Date: 17 March 1943
- Place: Biltmore Theatre
- Directed by: George Abbott

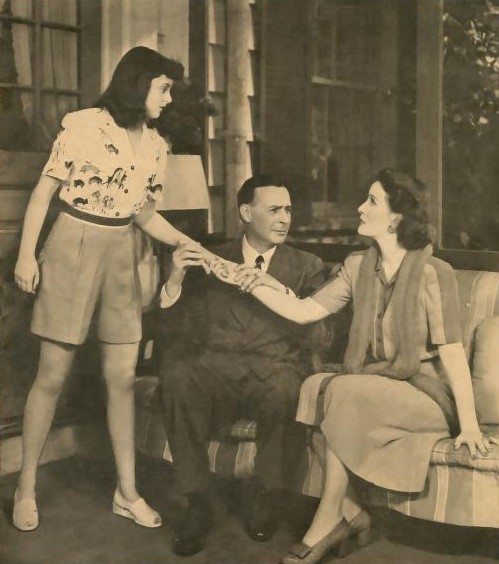
L-R: Patricia Kirkland, Clay Clement and Katherine Warren in a Chicago production of Kiss and Tell (1943).

Kiss and Tell is a 1943 Broadway play by F. Hugh Herbert.

Kiss and Tell starred Joan Caulfield as Corliss Archer and Judith Parrish as her friend Mildred Pringle. The play's great success led to offers from Hollywood for Caulfield, who left the production almost one year to the day from when it opened, and was replaced in her role by her sister Betty Caulfield.

== Production ==
Kiss and Tell premiered at the Wilbur Theatre in Boston on March 1, 1943 for tryout performances before its Broadway run. It opened in New York City on March 17, 1943 at the Biltmore Theatre. It remained there until the end of 1944, before transferring to the Bijou Theatre in 1945. It ran for a total of 956 performances before closing on June 23, 1945.

The show was produced and staged by George Abbott and written by F. Hugh Herbert. The cast included Joan Caulfield as Corliss Archer, Jessie Royce Landis as Janet Archer, Frances Bavier as Louise, Walter Davis as Uncle George, John Harvey as Private Earhart, Lulu Mae Hubbard as Dorothy Pringle, Robert Keith as Harry Archer, James Lane as Mr. Willard, Tommy Lewis as Raymond Pringle, Robert Lynn as Robert Pringle, Judith Parrish as Mildred Pringle, Calvin Thomas as Bill Franklin, Paula Trueman as Mary Franklin, Robert White as Dexter Franklin, and Richard Widmark as Lieut. Lenny Archer.

== Plot ==
Two teenage girls become interested in boys, and the girls' parents are making more problems rather than solving them.

== Film ==
A film version written by Herbert and based on his play was released by Columbia Pictures on October 4, 1945 with Shirley Temple in the role of Corliss Archer. The film was directed by Richard Wallace and produced by Sol C. Siegel. Temple would reprise the role in the film's sequel A Kiss for Corliss in 1949.
