= Jerome Courtland =

American actor, director and producer (1926–2012)

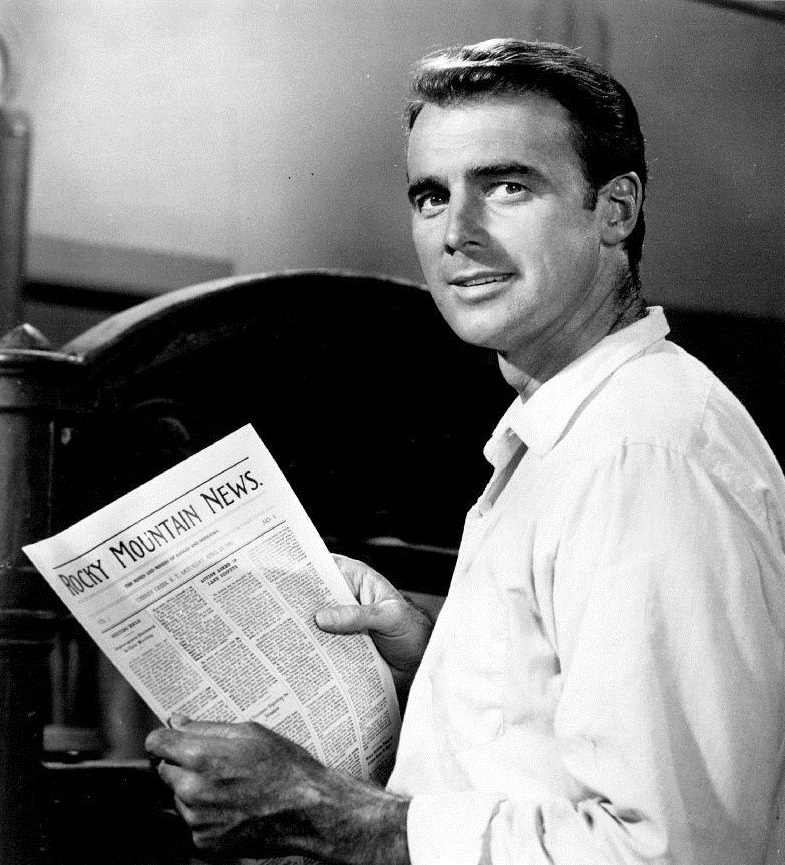
- Courtland in Death Valley Days in 1967
- Born: December 27, 1926; Knoxville, Tennessee, U.S.
- Died: March 1, 2012 (aged 85); Santa Clarita, California, U.S.
- Occupations: Actor; director; producer
- Years active: 1942–1993
- Spouses: Polly Bergen (m. 1950; div. 1955) Janet Rose Gumprecht (m. 1955, divorced) Marlene Juttner (m. 1984)
- Children: 5
- Military career
- Allegiance: United States
- Conflicts: World War II

Jerome Courtland (December 27, 1926 – March 1, 2012) was an American actor, director and producer. He acted in films in the 1940s, 1950s and 1960s, and in television in the 1950s and 1960s. Courtland also appeared on Broadway in the musical Flahooley in the early 1950s. He directed and produced television series in the 1960s, 1970s and 1980s. He served in the Pacific Theater of World War II.

== Biography ==
=== Actor ===
Jerome "Jerry" Courtland was born Courtland Jourolmon Jr. on December 27, 1926, in Knoxville, Tennessee. At 17, he attended a Hollywood party with his mother, a professional singer. A chance meeting with director Charles Vidor led to a screen test at Columbia Pictures and a seven-year contract. Courtland's feature debut was in Vidor's 1944 screwball comedy Together Again, before he joined the U.S. Army, serving in the Pacific Theatre of World War II.

After the War, Courtland starred opposite Shirley Temple in Kiss and Tell, followed by appearances in more than a dozen films including The Man From Colorado (1948), Battleground (1949), The Palomino (1950), The Barefoot Mailman (1951), and Take the High Ground (1953).

He was a licensed pilot and trained in stunt flying.

In 1951 Courtland starred on Broadway as the romantic lead in the short-lived musical Flahooley with Barbara Cook. Returning to California, he was frequently seen in guest roles on Westerns including The Rifleman, Death Valley Days and The Virginian.

In 1957, he starred in six episodes of ABC's Disneyland in the miniseries The Saga of Andy Burnett, the story of a Pittsburgh, Pennsylvania, man who comes west to the Rocky Mountains. This was an attempt by Walt Disney to follow up on the success of the first television miniseries, Davy Crockett. In 1958, Courtland guest starred in an episode of the television Western series The Rifleman. His voice was heard singing the title song during the credits in the movie Old Yeller. In 1959 he played the role of Army Lt. Henry Nowlan in the Disney film Tonka. Also that year he narrated the Disney short Noah's Ark, nominated for an Oscar the following year for Best Short Subject (Cartoon).

Courtland starred in the 1959-1960 television series Tales of the Vikings, as the lead character, Leif. He dyed his hair and beard blonde for the role. The series was produced by Kirk Douglas' film production company Brynaprod, was filmed in Germany, and ran for 39 episodes.

Courtland was cast as newspaperman William Byers in the 1965 episode, "The Race at Cherry Creek", on the syndicated television anthology series, Death Valley Days, hosted by Ronald Reagan. In the story line, Byers races against time to put out the first newspaper in the Colorado Territory during the gold rush year of 1859. His Rocky Mountain News became the first publication in the territory. Though strongly encouraged in the pursuit by his wife Elizabeth ([Nancy Rennick), Byers' pressman, Andy Kate (Alvy Moore), is pessimistic about their chances of publishing first.

=== Producer ===
In the 60s, Courtland gave up acting to produce for Disney, Screen Gems, and others.

In 1975, he produced the Walt Disney film, Ride a Wild Pony.

He was one of two producers of the partly animated 1977 Disney movie Pete's Dragon.

He was the producer of Escape to Witch Mountain in 1975, The Million Dollar Dixie Deliverance in 1978, Shadow of Fear in 1979, and The Devil and Max Devlin in 1981.

=== Director ===
In 1968 Courtland made his directorial debut with several episodes of The Flying Nun. In the 1980s he directed episodes of Aaron Spelling's Dynasty, Fantasy Island, The Love Boat and The Colbys.

In the early 1990s he made guest appearances on L.A. Law and Knots Landing. In 1997 he moved to the Chicago area, where for five years he taught acting and directing for the camera at Columbia College.

== Death ==
Courtland died on March 1, 2012, from heart disease, in Santa Clarita, California.

== Partial filmography ==
- Together Again (1944) - Gilbert Parker
- Kiss and Tell (1945) - Dexter Franklin
- The Man from Colorado (1948) - Johnny Howard
- Make Believe Ballroom (1949) - Gene Thomas
- Tokyo Joe (1949) - Danny
- Battleground (1949) - Abner Spudler
- A Woman of Distinction (1950) - Jerome
- The Palomino (1950) - Steve Norris
- When You're Smiling (1950) - Gerald Durham
- Santa Fe (1951) - Terry Canfield
- The Texas Rangers (1951) - Danny Carver, alias Bonner
- Sunny Side of the Street (1951) - Ted Mason
- The Barefoot Mailman (1951) - Steven Pierton
- Cripple Creek (1952) - Larry Galland
- Take the High Ground! (1953) - Elvin C. Carey
- The Bamboo Prison (1954) - Arkansas
- The Rifleman (1958, TV Series) (Season 1 Episode 5: "The Brother-in-Law") - Johnny Gibbs
- Tonka (1958) - Lieutenant Henry Nowlan
- O sole mio (1960) - Teddy Hill
- Queen of the Seas (1961) - Peter Goodwin
- Café Oriental (1962) - Michael
- Tharus Son of Attila (1962) - Tharus
- Black Spurs (1965) - Sam Grubbs
- The Restless Ones (1965)
- Escape to Witch Mountain (1975, Produced)
- Ride a Wild Pony (1975, Produced)
- The Wonderful World of Disney (1974-1980) (8 episodes)
  - (Season 20 Episode 14: "Hog Wild: Part 1") (1974, TV series, Co-Produced)
  - (Season 20 Episode 15: "Hog Wild: Part 2") (1974, TV series, Co-Produced)
  - (Season 24 Episode 17: "The Young Runaways") (1978, TV Series, Produced)
  - (Season 25 Episode 13: "Shadow of Fear: Part 1") (1979, TV series, Produced)
  - (Season 25 Episode 21: "The Sky Trap / Trampa en el Cielo") (1979, TV series, Produced)
  - (Season 27 Episode 5: "The Ghosts of Buxley Hall: Part 1") (1980, TV Series, Produced)
  - (Season 27 Episode 6: "The Ghosts of Buxley Hall: Part 2") (1980, TV Series, Produced)
  - (Episode: "Sultan and the Rock Star") (1980, TV Series, Produced)
