= Howard W. Polsky =

American social work scientist (1928–2003)

- Born: Howard William Polsky; April 16, 1928; Milwaukee, Wisconsin
- Died: October 19, 2003 (aged 75); New York City
- Known for: Polsky's Diamond
- Scientific career
- Fields: Social work
- Institutions: Columbia University

Howard William Polsky (16 April 1928 - 19 October 2003) was an American social work scientist at Columbia University, who researched social systems and fought socially based delinquency through youth group analyses. He notably conceptualized Polsky's Diamond, a typology of informal groups.
