= A Kiss for Corliss =

1949 film by Richard Wallace

- Theatrical release poster
- Directed by: Richard Wallace
- Written by: Howard Dimsdale
- Produced by: Colin Miller
- Starring: Shirley Temple; David Niven; Tom Tully; Virginia Welles; Darryl Hickman; Gloria Holden
- Cinematography: Robert De Grasse
- Edited by: Frank Doyle
- Music by: Werner R. Heymann
- Production company: Strand Productions
- Distributed by: United Artists
- Release date: November 25, 1949
- Running time: 88 minutes
- Country: United States
- Language: English

A Kiss for Corliss (retitled Almost a Bride before its release) is a 1949 American comedy film directed by Richard Wallace, written by Howard Dimsdale, and starring David Niven and Shirley Temple. The film, which was the last for both Wallace and Temple, was released on November 25, 1949, by United Artists. It is a sequel to the 1945 film Kiss and Tell, also directed by Wallace and starring Temple.

== Plot ==
Playboy Kenneth Marquis is divorcing his third wife, who is represented by her attorney, Harry Archer. Corliss, Archer's teenaged daughter, is smitten with the charismatic Marquis and his free-wheeling lifestyle. Marquis sends a box of candy to Corliss, infuriating Archer, who interprets the gift as a jab at his settlement demand. Archer also prohibits Corliss' boyfriend Dexter from dating her after he sees Dexter at the Penguin Club, a restaurant that doubles as a gambling joint. Corliss manipulates Dexter into taking her to the club, but just after they arrive, the club is raided by police. Corliss and Dexter hide in the basement, but are temporarily trapped, causing Corliss to arrive home late, so she feigns amnesia to her parents to cover the truth. To refresh Corliss' memory, Archer reads her diary, which contains her imaginary romantic trysts with Marquis. The contents of the diary, along with Marquis' gift of candy, cause Corliss' parents to assume the worst.

Corliss' friend Raymond Pringle, who publishes a neighborhood paper, shows Marquis some of the diary entries, threatening to publish them unless Marquis buys advertising. Marquis visits the Archers and says that every word in the diary is true, that he is in love with Corliss, and that he wants to make her his fourth wife. When Archer explodes in anger, Corliss admits that the diary is not true and was written to make Dexter jealous. Marquis insists that the diary is true, though Corliss reveals why she was out late. Dexter arrives and eventually agrees with Corliss' version of events, but the Archers remain unconvinced. Marquis announces his engagement to Corliss in the newspaper to sue the Archers for breach of promise when the engagement is cancelled. The Archers delay rescinding the engagement to avoid the appearance of an immediate breach.

Marquis has gifts for Corliss delivered, and Archer is hounded by the media. Corliss continues to insist that the diary is false to her parents' continuing disbelief. Glimpse, a national magazine, runs photos of Marquis and Corliss. Archer's brother Uncle George, a Navy chaplain, visits and offers to perform the wedding. At the wedding rehearsal, held in the Archers' home, Dexter tells Mr. Archer that he has a witness who can attest to Corliss and his version of the events from the night when she was out late. Marquis' lie is revealed and the men escort him outside, where an offscreen fight ensues, and Archer and Dexter both return bloodied. Archer had overcome Marquis in the fight, but Dexter had accidentally hit Archer. Marquis passes by an open window, his eye blackened, and mocks Archer and Dexter as he departs.

== Cast ==
- Shirley Temple as Corliss Archer
- David Niven as Kenneth Marquis
- Tom Tully as Harry P. Archer
- Virginia Welles as Mildred Pringle
- Darryl Hickman as Dexter Franklin
- Gloria Holden as Mrs. Janet Archer
- Robert Ellis as Raymond Pringle
- Kathryn Card as Louise
- Richard Gaines as Taylor
- Roy Roberts as Uncle George
