= Hollywood Cavalcade =

1939 American film

- Newspaper advertisement
- Directed by: Irving Cummings
- Screenplay by: Ernest Pascal
- Story by: Hilary Lynn; Brown Holmes
- Based on: an original idea by Lou Breslow
- Produced by: Darryl F. Zanuck
- Starring: Alice Faye; Don Ameche; J. Edward Bromberg; Alan Curtis
- Cinematography: Allen M. Davey; Ernest Palmer
- Edited by: Walter Thompson
- Music by: Cyril J. Mockridge; Rudy Schrager
- Production company: 20th Century Fox
- Distributed by: 20th Century Fox
- Release date: October 13, 1939
- Running time: 97 minutes
- Country: United States
- Language: English

Hollywood Cavalcade is a 1939 American comedy-drama film featuring Alice Faye as a young performer making her way in the early days of Hollywood, from slapstick silent pictures through the transition from silent to sound.

Famous directors and actors from the silent film era appear in the picture including Mack Sennett, Buster Keaton, Chester Conklin and Ben Turpin.

== Plot ==
In 1913 New York City, movie director Michael Linnett Connors chooses Broadway ingenue Molly Adair to be in his next film. He makes her a major star in slapstick comedies. Although she is in love with him, she can't understand his preoccupation with the picture business, and wrongly thinks that Connors regards her only in terms of movies. When she marries her co-star Nicky Hayden, Connors misunderstands her and fires her. The disillusioned director's career quickly declines, but his ice-cold demeanor changes when he sees the first talking feature film. Inspired, he approaches Molly and eagerly plans her first sound film. Mike Connors is actually a prop man for a small studio, but with big ideas. He sees Molly as a last minute understudy in a Broadway show and talks her into making the long, bumpy trip to California. Once there, he has to fast talk studio President Lyle P. Stout into giving him a chance at directing. After initial success, Stout turns down the idea of "Bathing Beauties" in comedies---so Molly and Mike start their own comedy studio with strong success---and the valuable help of Dave Spingold, who becomes Mike's right-hand man.

Molly is interested in Mike, but he is so wrapped up in his work she eventually marries her film leading man, Nicky Hayden. Mike takes the news poorly ("You ran out on me! You're mine and you're going to stay mine!") and fires them both for spite. Molly and Nicky rise ever higher in popularity, while Mike spends his studio into bankruptcy making big budget historical epics that are poorly received. Spingold walks out on him, hoping it will bring Mike to his senses.

Molly tries to bring Mike back as her director and he accepts because his finances say he must. But while driving fast to the set, Molly and Nicky have an auto accident. Nicky is killed and Molly is badly injured enough so she can't finish the film. Meanwhile, Al Jolson has premiered in The Jazz Singer, making silent films obsolete. Mike is fired when he refuses to finish the film with a stand-in. But he steals the master print of the film and says it will be returned only if he can do it his way. The studio caves in and the remastered talkie is released to praise. The trio of Molly, Mike, and Spingold go on to future successes.

== Cast ==
- Alice Faye as Molly Adair Hayden
- Don Ameche as Mike Connors
- J. Edward Bromberg as Dave Spingold
- Alan Curtis as Nicky Hayden
- Stuart Erwin as Pete Tinney, Mike's cameraman
- Jed Prouty as Keystone Cop Police Chief
- Buster Keaton as himself
- Donald Meek as Lyle P. Stout, producer
- George Givot as Claude, Molly's suitor opposite Keaton
- Al Jolson as himself
- Eddie Collins as Keystone Cop
- Russell Hicks as Roberts, film executive
- Hank Mann as Keystone Cop
- Heinie Conklin as Keystone Cop
- James Finlayson as Keystone Cop
- Chick Chandler as Chick, Mike's assistant director
- Snub Pollard as Keystone Cop
- Robert Lowery as Henry Potter
- Ben Welden as Agent
- Willie Fung as Willie
- Paul Stanton as Filson
- Mary Forbes as Mrs. Gaynes
- Joseph Crehan as Attorney
- Irving Bacon as Clerk
- Ben Turpin as Bartender in Western
- Chester Conklin as Sheriff in Western
- Marjorie Beebe as Telephone Operator
- Frederick Burton as Thomas
- June Preston as little girl with hat on Balcony
- Lee Duncan as Lee Duncan, the Dog Trainer
- Rin Tin Tin Jr. as Rin-Tin-Tin
- Mack Sennett as himself

== Production ==
In the wake of Alice Faye's 1938 success Alexander's Ragtime Band, which took a nostalgic look at the musical scene of the 1910s, screenwriter Lou Breslow approached studio chief Darryl F. Zanuck with an idea to do another period piece, this time in Technicolor, concerning the early days of silent movies. The film was directed by Irving Cummings, with comedy sequences directed by Mal St. Clair.

St. Clair's friend and mentor Buster Keaton staged some of the gags, and a host of silent-era comedians re-created slapstick sight gags. The romance in the storyline was based on the real-life relationship between pioneer producer Mack Sennett (he also served as technical advisor) and his first star, Mabel Normand.

Atypical for Faye's 20th Century-Fox output, Hollywood Cavalcade has no musical numbers, and the tone is more dramatic than comic. (The working title was Falling Stars.) The film presents a fictionalized look at silent-era performers and their productions, and ends just after the silent-film industry converts to sound films.

=== Silent sequences ===
St. Clair and Zanuck had collaborated on a number of projects in the silent era, among these the Rin Tin Tin films for Warner Bros. and Universal studio's boxing-themed Leather Pushers series. The Film Booking Offices of America series starring Alberta Vaughn were also re-created in Hollywood Cavalcade. This 1925 series, directed by St. Clair, is now thought to be lost. Film historian Ruth Anne Dwyer reports that St. Clair's handling of these sequences in 1939 suggest that the series “might have been adventurous and high-spirited” in the originals.

Dwyer observes that the St. Clair's silent sequences in Hollywood Cavalcade appear as inflated recollections of the films of that era, rather than precise facsimiles:

Like most nostalgia, the representation is not what really happened but an exaggerated “remembrance” of what happened...the characters, acting, pie-throwing are “overblown” for the purposes of parody.

As a homage to the comedy “2-reelers” of Mack Sennett, of which St. Clair directed several, the 1-reel short, Why Beaches are Popular (1919) was recreated for Hollywood Cavalcade.
