= Don Ameche =

American actor (1908–1993)

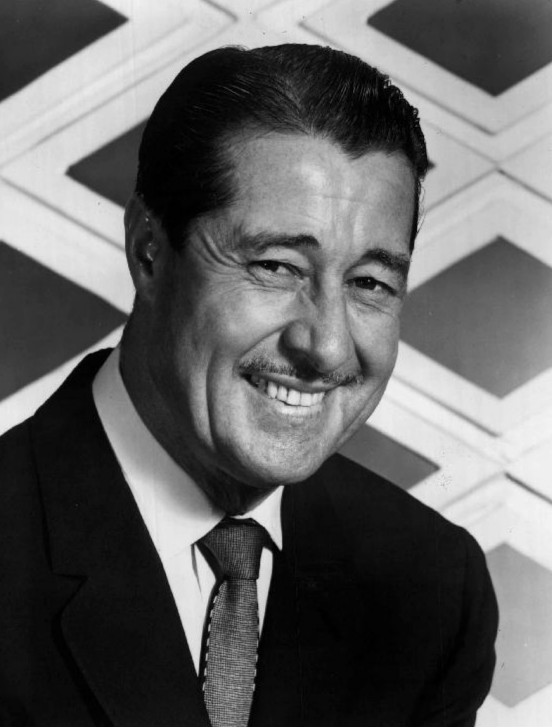
- Ameche on the set of International Showtime in 1964
- Born: Dominic Felix Amici; May 31, 1908; Kenosha, Wisconsin, U.S.
- Died: December 6, 1993 (aged 85); Scottsdale, Arizona, U.S.
- Resting place: Resurrection Cemetery; Asbury, Iowa, U.S.
- Education: Loras College; Marquette University; University of Wisconsin
- Occupations: Actor; comedian; vaudevillian
- Years active: 1928–1993
- Political party: Republican
- Spouse: Honore Prendergast (m. 1932; died 1986)
- Children: 6
- Relatives: Jim Ameche (brother); Alan Ameche (cousin)

Don Ameche (/əˈmiːtʃi/; born Dominic Felix Amici; May 31, 1908 – December 6, 1993) was an American actor, comedian and vaudevillian. After playing in college shows, repertory theatre, and vaudeville, he became a major radio star in the early 1930s, which led to the offer of a movie contract from 20th Century Fox in 1935.

In the 1950s, he worked on Broadway and in television and was the host of NBC's International Showtime from 1961 to 1965. Returning to film work in his later years, Ameche enjoyed a fruitful revival of his career, beginning with his role as a villain in the comedy hit Trading Places (1983). He won the Academy Award for Best Supporting Actor for his performance in Cocoon (1985) and the Volpi Cup for Best Actor for his performance in Things Change (1988).

== Early life ==
Don Ameche was born as Dominic Felix Amici on May 31, 1908, in Kenosha, Wisconsin. His father, Felice Amici, was a bartender from Montemonaco, Ascoli Piceno, Marche, Italy. His mother, Barbara Etta Hertel, was of Scottish, Irish, and German ancestry. Ameche was the second oldest of eight children: sisters Elizabeth, Catherine, Mary and Anna, and brothers Louis, Umberto (Bert) and James (Jim Ameche), who was also a well-known actor. Ameche attended Marquette University, Loras College, and the University of Wisconsin–Madison, where his cousin Alan Ameche played football and won the Heisman Trophy in 1954.

== Career ==
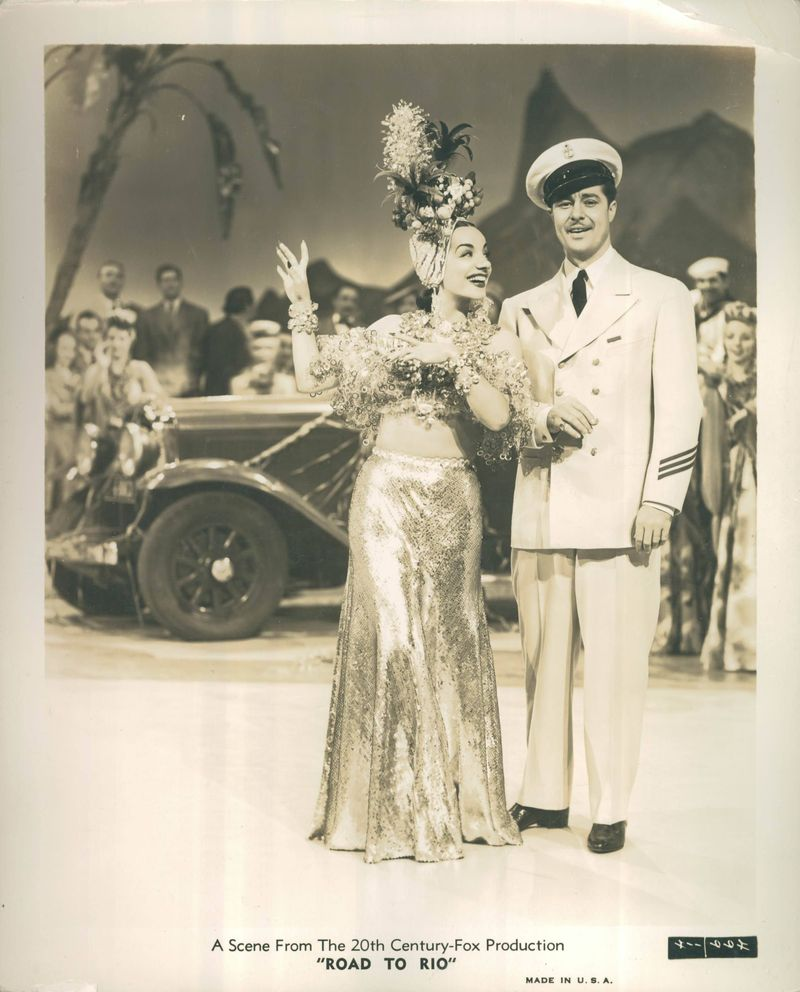
Ameche and Carmen Miranda in That Night in Rio (1941)

Ameche had done well in college dramatics at the University of Wisconsin, and when a lead actor for a stock company production of Excess Baggage did not turn up, a friend persuaded him to stand in for the missing actor. He enjoyed the experience and got a juvenile lead in Jerry For Short in New York, followed by a tour in vaudeville with Texas Guinan until she dropped him from the act, dismissing him as "too stiff".

Ameche then moved to Chicago, where "he began a radio career in 1930 on Empire Builders, a program broadcast from the Merchandise Mart. By 1932, Ameche had become the leading man on two other Chicago-based programs: the dramatic anthology First Nighter and Betty and Bob, the latter considered by many to be the forerunner of the soap-opera genre."

Brought to Hollywood by 20th Century Fox producer Darryl Zanuck, Ameche played mostly romantic leads paired with many of the top female stars of the era. In 1939, he played a lead character in comedy film Midnight (1939). He also played the title character in The Story of Alexander Graham Bell (1939) which led to the use of the word "ameche" as juvenile slang for a telephone. As noted by Mike Kilen in the Iowa City Gazette (December 8, 1993), "The film prompted a generation to call people to the telephone with the phrase: 'You're wanted on the Ameche.'" Such an identity between Ameche and the telephone was forged, that in the 1940 film Go West, Groucho Marx proclaims, "Telephone? This is 1870, Don Ameche hasn't invented the telephone yet."

Ameche was Alice Faye's leading man in Hollywood Cavalcade (1939), then played another real-life figure, Stephen Foster, in Swanee River (1939). He did a third biopic, Lillian Russell (1940), with Faye, and was top billed in a war film, Four Sons (1940). He also starred in two popular musicals, Down Argentine Way (1940), which helped make stars of Betty Grable and Carmen Miranda, and Moon Over Miami (1941), also with Grable. In 1940, he was voted the 21st-most-popular star in Hollywood.

Ameche did Heaven Can Wait (1943), Happy Land (1943), Wing and a Prayer (1944) and Greenwich Village (1944). In 1944, he reportedly earned $247,677 for 1943 ($4,495,498 in 2024 dollars), making him the second-highest earner at 20th Century Fox after Spyros Skouras.

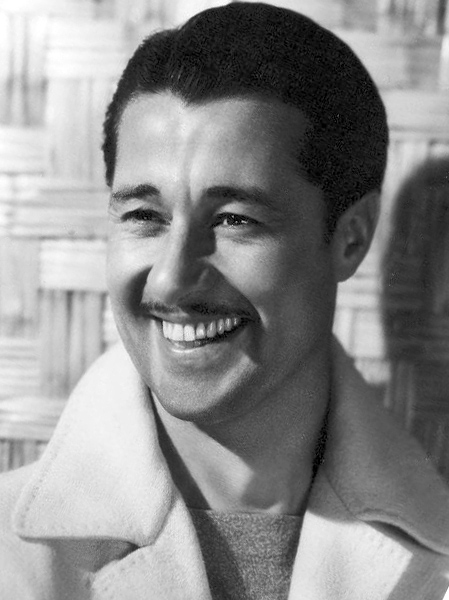
Ameche in 1946

Following his appearances as announcer and sketch participant on The Chase and Sanborn Hour, Ameche achieved memorable success during the late 1940s playing opposite Frances Langford in The Bickersons, the Philip Rapp radio comedy series about a combative married couple. It began on NBC in 1946, moving to CBS the following year. He also had his own program, The Old Gold Don Ameche Show, on NBC Red in the early 1940s.

In 1950 Ameche became the star of Holiday Hotel, on ABC-TV.

Over the years he released many singles and albums, two albums charted, both with Frances Langford. The Bickersons, in 1962, (No. 76 on Billboard Top LPs), and The Bickersons Fight Back, released later that year, (No. 109 on Billboard Top LPs).

Ameche appeared regularly in films until 1970, as he shifted to television and the stage. He returned to films after thirteen years with Trading Places (1983), where he was cast when director John Landis had someone in mind from the 1930s and 1940s who had not played many villainous roles and came upon Ameche (after Ray Milland was passed over due to not being able to pass the insurance physical). Ameche took on the role after Landis tracked him down in Santa Monica, California, initially unable to reach him through the Screen Actors Guild, who said that his royalty payments were going to his son in Arizona. This started a comeback where Ameche would appear more regularly in films, including Cocoon (1985, which earned him an Academy Award for Best Supporting Actor), Harry and the Hendersons (1987), Coming to America (1988) and Cocoon: The Return (1988).

He earned good reviews for the David Mamet and Shel Silverstein-penned Things Change (1988); The New York Times said that he showed "the kind of great comic aplomb that wins actors awards for other than sentimental reasons." His later credits included an episode of The Golden Girls (1990), the films Oscar (1991), Folks! (1992), and the voice of Shadow in Homeward Bound: The Incredible Journey (1993). His final appearance was in the film Corrina, Corrina (1994), which was released posthumously.

== Personal life and death ==
From 1946 to 1949, together with other Los Angeles entertainment figures including Bing Crosby and Bob Hope, Ameche owned the Los Angeles Dons of the All-America Football Conference, a rival to the National Football League. He was instrumental in forming and leading the ownership group the year before play began and initially served as team president.

Ameche was married to Honore Prendergast from 1932 until her death in 1986. They were separated from each other at the time of her death and Ameche did not attend her funeral according to her 1986 obituary. They had six children: two daughters, Connie and Bonnie, and four sons, Lonnie, Dominic, Thomas and Ronald, who owned a restaurant called "Ameche's Pumpernickel" in Coralville, Iowa. Ameche's younger brother, Jim, died in 1983 at the age of 67.

Ameche was Roman Catholic and a Republican who supported the campaign of Thomas Dewey in the 1944 United States presidential election.

On December 6, 1993, Ameche died at his son Dominic’s house in Scottsdale, Arizona, of prostate cancer at age 85. He was cremated and his ashes are buried at Resurrection Catholic Cemetery in Asbury, Iowa.

== Filmography ==
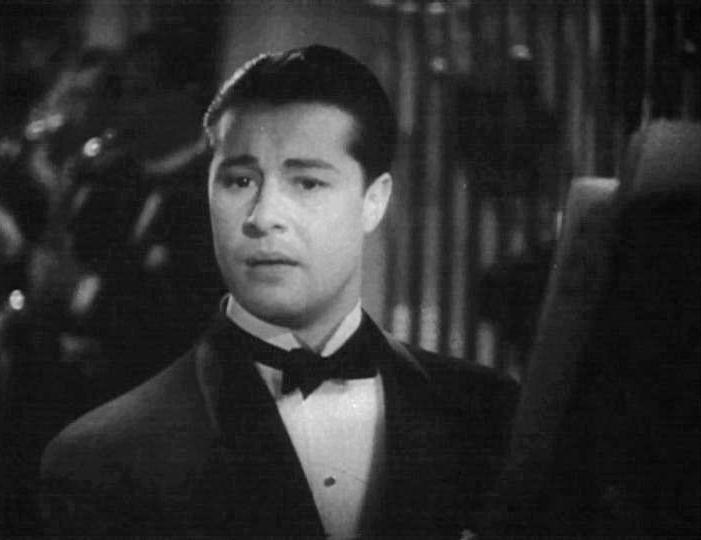
Ameche in the 1938 film Alexander's Ragtime Band

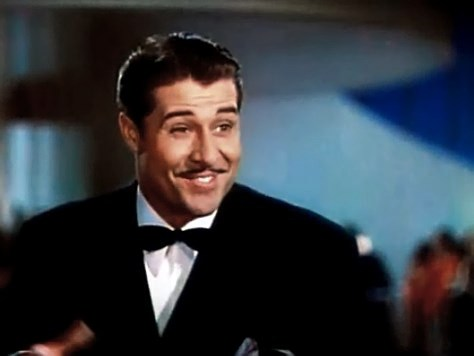
Ameche in Down Argentine Way (1940)

=== Film and TV ===
Year	Title	Role	Notes
1935	Clive of India	Prisoner in the Black Hole	Uncredited
1935	Dante's Inferno	Man in Stoke-Hold	Uncredited
1936	Sins of Man	Karl Freyman / Mario Signarelli	
1936	Ramona	Alessandro	
1936	Ladies in Love	Dr. Rudi Imre	
1936	One in a Million	Bob Harris	
1937	Love Is News	Martin J. Canavan	
1937	Fifty Roads to Town	Peter Nostrand	
1937	You Can't Have Everything	George Macrae	
1937	Love Under Fire	Tracy Egan	
1938	In Old Chicago	Jack O'Leary	
1938	Happy Landing	Jimmy Hall	
1938	Alexander's Ragtime Band	Charlie Dwyer	
1938	Josette	David Brassard Jr.	
1938	Gateway	Dick Court	
1939	The Three Musketeers	D'Artagnan	
1939	Midnight	Tibor Czerny	
1939	The Story of Alexander Graham Bell	Alexander Graham Bell	
1939	Hollywood Cavalcade	Michael Linnett 'Mike' Connors	
1939	Swanee River	Stephen Foster	
1940	Lillian Russell	Edward Solomon	
1940	Four Sons	Chris Bern	
1940	Down Argentine Way	Ricardo Quintana	
1941	That Night in Rio	Impersonator Larry Martin / Baron Manuel Duarte	
1941	Moon Over Miami	Phil O'Neil (Credits) / Phil 'Mac' McNeil (in Film)	
1941	Kiss the Boys Goodbye	Lloyd Lloyd	
1941	The Feminine Touch	Prof. John Hathaway	
1941	Confirm or Deny	'Mitch' Mitchell	
1942	The Magnificent Dope	Dwight Dawson	
1942	Girl Trouble	Pedro Sullivan	
1943	Something to Shout About	Ken Douglas	
1943	Heaven Can Wait	Henry Van Cleve	
1943	Happy Land	Lew Marsh	
1944	Wing and a Prayer	Flight Cmdr. Bingo Harper	
1944	Greenwich Village	Kenneth Harvey	
1945	It's in the Bag!	as himself	(cameo appearance)
1945	Guest Wife	Joseph Jefferson 'Joe' Parker	
1946	So Goes My Love	Hiram Stephen Maxim	
1947	That's My Man	Joe Grange	
1948	Sleep, My Love	Richard W. Courtland	
1949	Slightly French	John Gayle	
1954	Phantom Caravan	Lawrence Evans	
1961	A Fever in the Blood	Senator Alex S. Simon	
1966	Rings Around the World	Himself	
1966	Picture Mommy Dead	Edward Shelley	
1970	The Boatniks	Commander Taylor	
1970	Suppose They Gave a War and Nobody Came	Col. Flanders	
1971	Columbo	Frank Simpson	Episode: "Suitable for Framing", Season 1
1983	Trading Places	Mortimer Duke	
1985	Cocoon	Art Selwyn	Won Oscar for Best Supporting Actor
1986	A Masterpiece of Murder	Frank Aherne	TV movie
1987	Pals	Art Riddle / Arthur James Van Pelt	TV movie
1987	Harry and the Hendersons	Dr. Wallace Wrightwood	
1988	Coming to America	Mortimer Duke	Cameo
1988	Things Change	Gino	
1988	Cocoon: The Return	Art Selwyn	
1990	Oddball Hall	G. Paul Siebriese	
1990	The Golden Girls	Brother Martin	Episode: "Once in St. Olaf"
1991	Oscar	Father Clemente	
1992	Folks!	Harry Aldrich	
1992	Sunstroke	Jake	
1993	Homeward Bound: The Incredible Journey	Shadow	Voice; final film role and only voice role
1994	Corrina, Corrina	Grandpa Harry	Posthumous release

=== Short subjects ===
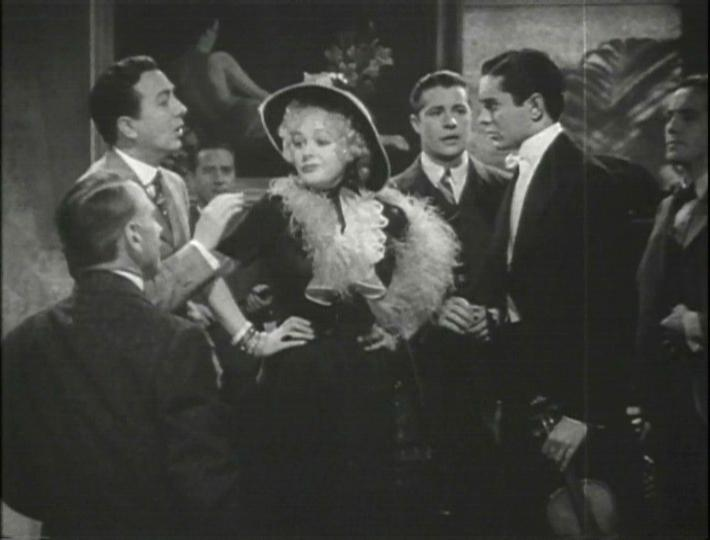
Jack Haley (left), Alice Faye (center), Don Ameche and Tyrone Power (right) in a trailer for Alexander's Ragtime Band

- Screen Snapshots: Stars at the Tropical Ice Gardens (1939)
- Weekend in Hollywood (1947)
- Screen Snapshots: Hollywood Night at 21 Club (1952)

=== Stage work ===
- Hazel Flagg (1954)
- Silk Stockings (1955)
- Holiday for Lovers (1957)
- Goldilocks (1958)
- 13 Daughters (1961)
- How to Succeed in Business Without Really Trying (1966)
- Henry, Sweet Henry (1967)
- The Moon Is Blue (1972)
- No, No, Nanette (1972)
- Never Get Smart with an Angel (1977)
- Mame (1978)
- Life with Father (1979)
- How to Succeed in Business Without Really Trying (1981)
- Our Town (1989) (replacement for Spalding Gray)

=== Radio appearances ===
Year	Program	Episode/source
1940	Lux Radio Theatre	Manhattan Melodrama
1947	Family Theater	"Flight from Home"

== Bibliography ==
- Ohmart, Ben (2007). Don Ameche: The Kenosha Comeback Kid. Albany: BearManor Media. ISBN 978-1-59393-045-5. OCLC 759626448.
