= Nancy Kelly =

American actress (1921–1995)

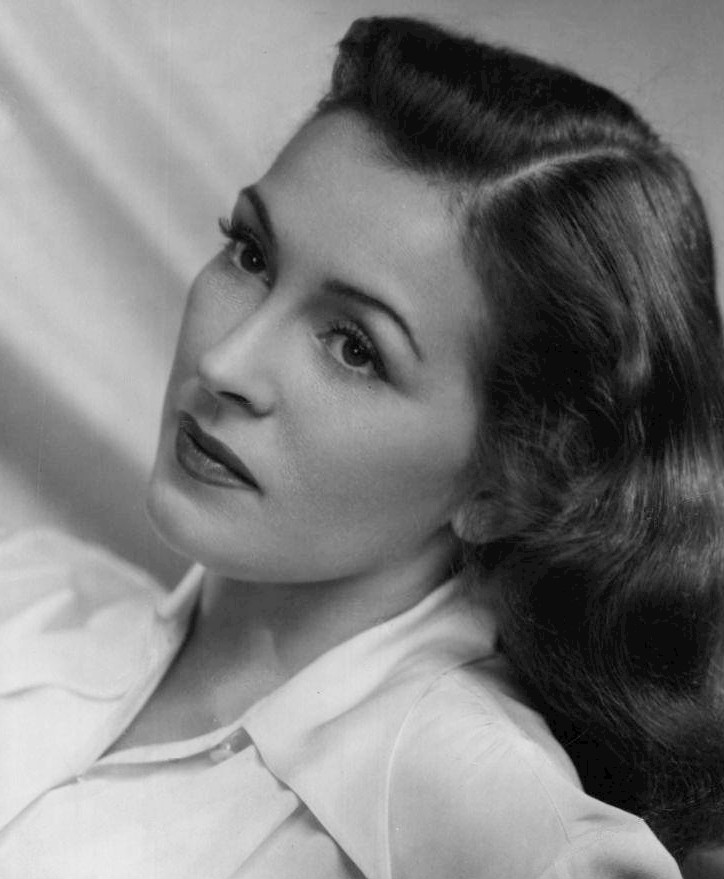
- Publicity photograph
- Born: March 25, 1921; Lowell, Massachusetts, U.S.
- Died: January 2, 1995 (aged 73); Los Angeles, California, U.S.
- Education: Immaculate Conception Academy (California); Saint Lawrence Academy (Santa Clara)
- Occupation: Actress
- Years active: 1926–1977
- Notable work: Jesse James; One Night In The Tropics; Tarzan's Desert Mystery; The Bad Seed; Who's Afraid of Virginia Woolf?; Studio One
- Spouses: Edmond O'Brien (m. 1941; div. 1942) Fred Jackman, Jr. (m. 1946; div. 1950) Warren Caro (m. 1955; div. 1968)
- Children: 1
- Relatives: Jack Kelly (brother)
- Awards: Tony Award for Best Actress in a Play; Hollywood Walk of Fame

Nancy Kelly (March 25, 1921 – January 2, 1995) was an American actress in film, theater, and television. A child actress and model, she was a repertory cast member of CBS Radio's The March of Time, and appeared in several films in the late 1920s. She became a leading lady upon returning to the screen in the late 1930s, while still in her teens, and made two dozen movies between 1938 and 1946, including portraying Tyrone Power's love interest in the classic Jesse James (1939), which also featured Henry Fonda, and playing opposite Spencer Tracy in Stanley and Livingstone, later that same year. After turning to the stage in the late 1940s, she had her greatest success in a character role, the distraught mother in The Bad Seed, receiving a Tony Award for Best Actress in a Play for the 1955 stage production and an Academy Award nomination as Best Actress for the 1956 film adaptation, her last film role. Kelly worked regularly in television until 1963, then took over the role of Martha in the original Broadway production of Who's Afraid of Virginia Woolf? for several months. She returned to television for a handful of appearances in the mid-1970s.

== Biography ==
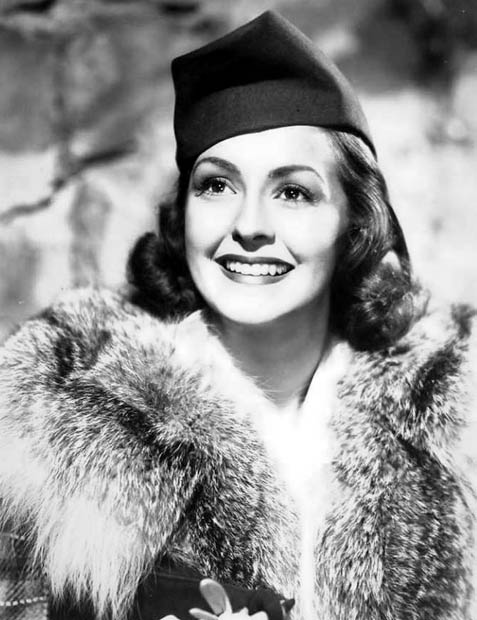
Studio publicity portrait circa 1940s

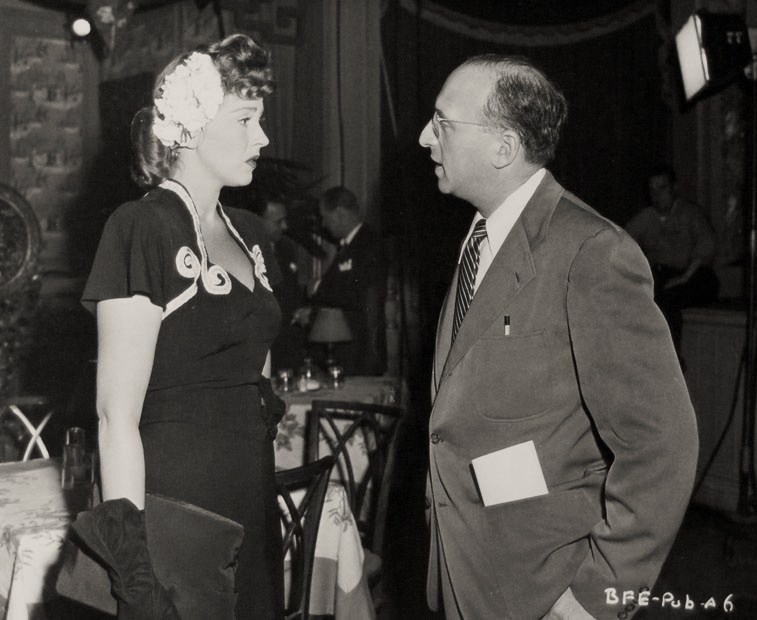
On set with director William Berke during Betrayal from the East (1945)

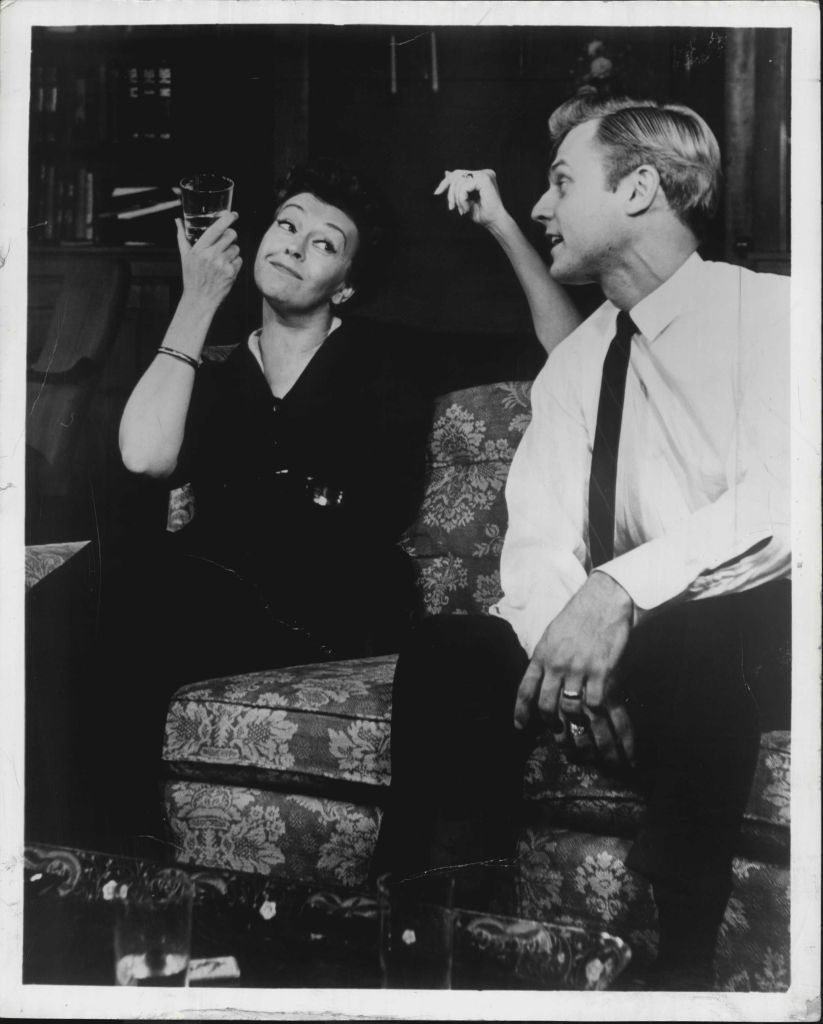
Onstage with Ken Kercheval in Who's Afraid of Virginia Woolf? (1963)

Of Irish descent, Kelly was born in Lowell, Massachusetts, into a theatrical family. Her mother was silent film actress Nan Kelly, who coached her and managed her career. As a child actress, Kelly appeared in 52 films made on the East Coast by the age of 17. Her younger brother was actor Jack Kelly, most noted for playing the role of Bart Maverick, one of the leads (alongside James Garner, Roger Moore or Robert Colbert) in the ABC television series Maverick (1957-1962). The Kelly siblings, who resembled each other, are not currently known to have worked together in film or television.

Kelly was educated at Bentley School for Girls, Immaculate Conception Academy, and Saint Lawrence Academy.

As a child model, her image had appeared in so many different advertisements by the time she was nine years old that Film Daily commented, "Nancy has been referred to as 'the most photographed child in America,' largely because of her commercial posing."

Kelly worked extensively in radio in her adolescent years. She played Dorothy Gale in a 1933–34 NBC Radio Network show, The Wizard of Oz, based on The Wonderful Wizard of Oz. Kelly was the first ingenue on CBS Radio's The March of Time series, with a vocal versatility that made it possible for her to portray male parts as well as female. She also portrayed Eleanor Roosevelt. As an adult, Nancy Kelly was a leading lady in 27 movies in the 1930s and '40s, including director John Ford's Submarine Patrol (1938) with Preston Foster, Frontier Marshal (1939) with Randolph Scott as Wyatt Earp, Jesse James (1939) with Tyrone Power and Henry Fonda, Stanley and Livingstone (1939) with Spencer Tracy, the comedy He Married His Wife (1940) with Joel McCrea, Parachute Battalion (1941) with Robert Preston, Edmond O'Brien, Harry Carey, and Buddy Ebsen, and Tarzan's Desert Mystery (1943) with Johnny Weissmuller. She also starred in the 1949 Broadway play The Big Knife by Clifford Odets. Kelly was subsequently a two-time winner of the Sarah Siddons Award for her work in Chicago theatrical productions as well as a Tony Award for Best Actress in a Play winner for her performance in The Bad Seed, which she followed up by starring in the 1956 film version, receiving a nomination for the Academy Award for Best Actress. She also starred on television, including leading roles in "The Storm" (1961) episode of Thriller and "The Lonely Hours" (1963) episode of The Alfred Hitchcock Hour. In 1957 she was nominated at the 9th Primetime Emmy Awards for an Emmy Award for Best Single Performance by an Actress for the episode "The Pilot" in Studio One.

== Marriages ==
Kelly was married to actor Edmond O'Brien briefly from 1941–1942, and then to Fred Jackman, Jr., son of silent Hollywood cameraman and director Fred Jackman, from 1946 to 1950. She was married to theater director Warren Caro from 1955 to 1968. She and Caro had a daughter, Kelly Caro, in 1957.

== Death ==
Kelly died at her Bel Air, California, home on January 2, 1995, from complications of diabetes at the age of 73. She was survived by a daughter and three granddaughters. She was interred in the Westwood Village Memorial Park Cemetery in Los Angeles. She died one day after her former husband, Warren Caro.

== Walk of Fame ==
For her contribution to the motion picture industry, she has a star on the Hollywood Walk of Fame at 7021 Hollywood Blvd. She was inducted on February 8, 1960.

== Filmography ==
- The Untamed Lady (1926) with Gloria Swanson
- Mismates (1926) with Warner Baxter
- The Great Gatsby (1926) with Warner Baxter and William Powell
- Girl on the Barge (1929) with Jean Hersholt
- Glorifying the American Girl (1929; uncredited) with Mary Eaton
- Convention Girl (1935) with Shemp Howard
- Submarine Patrol (1938; directed by John Ford) with Preston Foster and George Bancroft
- Jesse James (1939) with Tyrone Power, Henry Fonda, and Randolph Scott
- Tail Spin (1939) with Alice Faye, Constance Bennett, Charles Farrell, and Jane Wyman
- Frontier Marshal (1939) with Randolph Scott as Wyatt Earp
- Stanley and Livingstone (1939) with Spencer Tracy and Walter Brennan
- He Married His Wife (1940) with Joel McCrea
- Sailor's Lady (1940) with Joan Davis and Dana Andrews
- Private Affairs (1940) with Hugh Herbert and Robert Cummings
- One Night in the Tropics (1940) with Allan Jones and Abbott & Costello
- Scotland Yard (1941) with Edmund Gwenn
- A Very Young Lady (1941) with Jane Withers
- Parachute Battalion (1941) with Robert Preston, Edmond O'Brien, Harry Carey, and Buddy Ebsen
- Fly-by-Night (1942; directed by Robert Siodmak) with Richard Carlson
- To the Shores of Tripoli (1942) with John Payne, Maureen O'Hara, and Randolph Scott
- Friendly Enemies (1942) with Charles Ruggles
- Tornado (1943) with Chester Morris
- Women in Bondage (1943) with Gail Patrick
- Tarzan's Desert Mystery (1943) with Johnny Weissmuller
- Gambler's Choice (1944) with Chester Morris
- Show Business (1944) with Eddie Cantor and George Murphy
- Double Exposure (1944) with Chester Morris
- Betrayal from the East (1945) with Lee Tracy
- Song of the Sarong (1945) with William Gargan
- The Woman Who Came Back (1945) with John Loder and Otto Kruger
- Follow That Woman (1945) with William Gargan and Regis Toomey
- Murder in the Music Hall (1946) with Vera Ralston
- Crowded Paradise (1956) with Hume Cronyn
- The Bad Seed (1956) with Patty McCormack
- The Alfred Hitchcock Hour (1963) (Season 1 Episode 23: "The Lonely Hours") as Mrs. J.A. Williams / Vera Brandon
- Murder at the World Series (1975) with Lynda Day George

== Radio appearances ==
Year	Program	Episode/source
1944	Suspense	"Eve"
1945	Suspense	"A Week Ago Wednesday"
1946	Suspense	"Dark Journey"
1946	Suspense	
