= The Moon Is Blue =

Play by F. Hugh Herbert

The Moon Is Blue is a play by F. Hugh Herbert. A comedy in three acts, the play consists of one female and three male characters.

== Performance history ==
The Moon Is Blue premiered at The Playhouse in Wilmington, Delaware on February 16, 1951 for tryout performances in preparation for the New York stage. This was followed by further tryout performances at the Wilbur Theatre in Boston in early March 1951. The production premiered on Broadway on March 8, 1951 at Henry Miller's Theatre with Barbara Bel Geddes as Patty O'Neill, Donald Cook as David Slater, Barry Nelson as Donald Gresham, and Ralph Dunn as Michael O'Neill. Produced by Richard Aldrich, Richard Myers, and Julius Fleischmann, the production was staged by Otto Preminger. A hit, the play closed in 1953 after 924 performances.

Given the audience response to the work, the same production team mounted a concurrent national tour starring Maggie McNamara as Patty O'Neill, Murray Hamilton as Donald Gresham, Leon Ames as David Slater, and Wallace Rooney as Michael O'Neill which began in Detroit on April 20, 1951. Prior to going on tour, the cast performed scenes from the play on the television program Showtime, U.S.A. McNamara later replaced Barbara Bel Geddes as Patty in the Broadway production in 1952. A second national touring company operated by Warren Caro and the Theatre Guild began its tour in Pittsburgh on October 20, 1951 with a cast including Hiram Sherman and Coleen Gray.

The play received several stagings internationally including at the J.C. WIlliamson Theatre in Melbourne, Australia (1951), the Alléteatern in Stockholm Sweden (1952), the Jofestadt Theatre in Vienna, Austria (1952)., and Hamilton Theatre in Hamilton, Bermuda (1953). In July 1952 the La Jolla Playhouse staged the play with Diana Lynn, Scott Brady, David Niven, and Jack Shea. An eight week tour of the play throughout Texas starring John Ireland and Joanne Dru occurred in the summer of 1953.

The play debuted on London's West End at the Duke of York's Theatre on July 7, 1953 with Diana Lynn as Patty O'Neill, Biff McGuire as Donald Graham, Robert Flemyng as David Slater, and Harry Fine as Michael O'Neill.

The play was revived Off-Broadway in 1961 at the 41st St Theatre. Staged by Matt Cimber, the production starred Patricia Bosworth as Patty O'Neill, William Severs as Donald Gresham, Walter Flanagan as Michael O'Neill, and Donald Cook is a reprisal of his Broadway role as David Slater.

== Film adaptation ==
A 1953 film adaptation of the play was released by United Artists. Otto Preminger, who had directed the original stage production, also directed this film. Maggie McNamara and David Niven reprised the roles that they had played on stage in the film.
