= Tarzan's Desert Mystery =

1943 film by Wilhelm Thiele

- Directed by: Wilhelm Thiele
- Written by: Carroll Young (story); Edward T. Lowe Jr.
- Based on: Characters created by Edgar Rice Burroughs
- Produced by: Sol Lesser
- Starring: Johnny Weissmuller; Nancy Kelly
- Cinematography: Harry J. Wild; Russell Harlan
- Edited by: Ray H. Lockert
- Music by: Paul Sawtell
- Distributed by: RKO Radio Pictures
- Release date: December 26, 1943
- Running time: 70 minutes
- Country: United States
- Language: English

Tarzan's Desert Mystery is a 1943 American Tarzan film directed by Wilhelm Thiele and starring Johnny Weissmuller and Nancy Kelly.

Like its immediate predecessor, Tarzan Triumphs, the film mentions Tarzan's mate, Jane, but does not show her on screen. The explanation for her absence, as in the earlier film, is that she is still in the United Kingdom contributing to the war effort. (Maureen O'Sullivan had played Jane in the first six of Weissmuller's Tarzan films, but when the character of Jane returned after a two-picture absence, she was played by Brenda Joyce, not O'Sullivan.)

The picture's supporting players include Johnny Sheffield as "Boy", Otto Kruger, Joe Sawyer, Robert Lowery and John Dehner in an unbilled role as Prince Ameer.

== Plot ==
Tarzan receives a request from Jane, who is helping out on the British home front in World War II, to locate a rare plant-derived serum that can save the lives of many service members. He sets off into the Sahara, which is the shortest route to the place where the plants can be found. Boy and Cheetah tag along, and soon they are joined by a rambunctious horse and traveling magician Connie Bryce (Nancy Kelly), who has been entertaining Allied soldiers in the region.

The group travels to Connie's next destination, a small Arab kingdom in the desert. Tarzan intends to drop her off and continue his journey, not knowing that she is on a secret mission from Washington to thwart Nazi spies who have infiltrated the kingdom. Tarzan and Connie quickly run afoul of these devious agents, who manage to frame the two for crimes against the royal family. The apeman leads a daring escape with the help of Cheetah. Then, with the Nazis hot on their heels, the travelers head for the strange prehistoric jungle where the serum plants grow.

== Cast ==
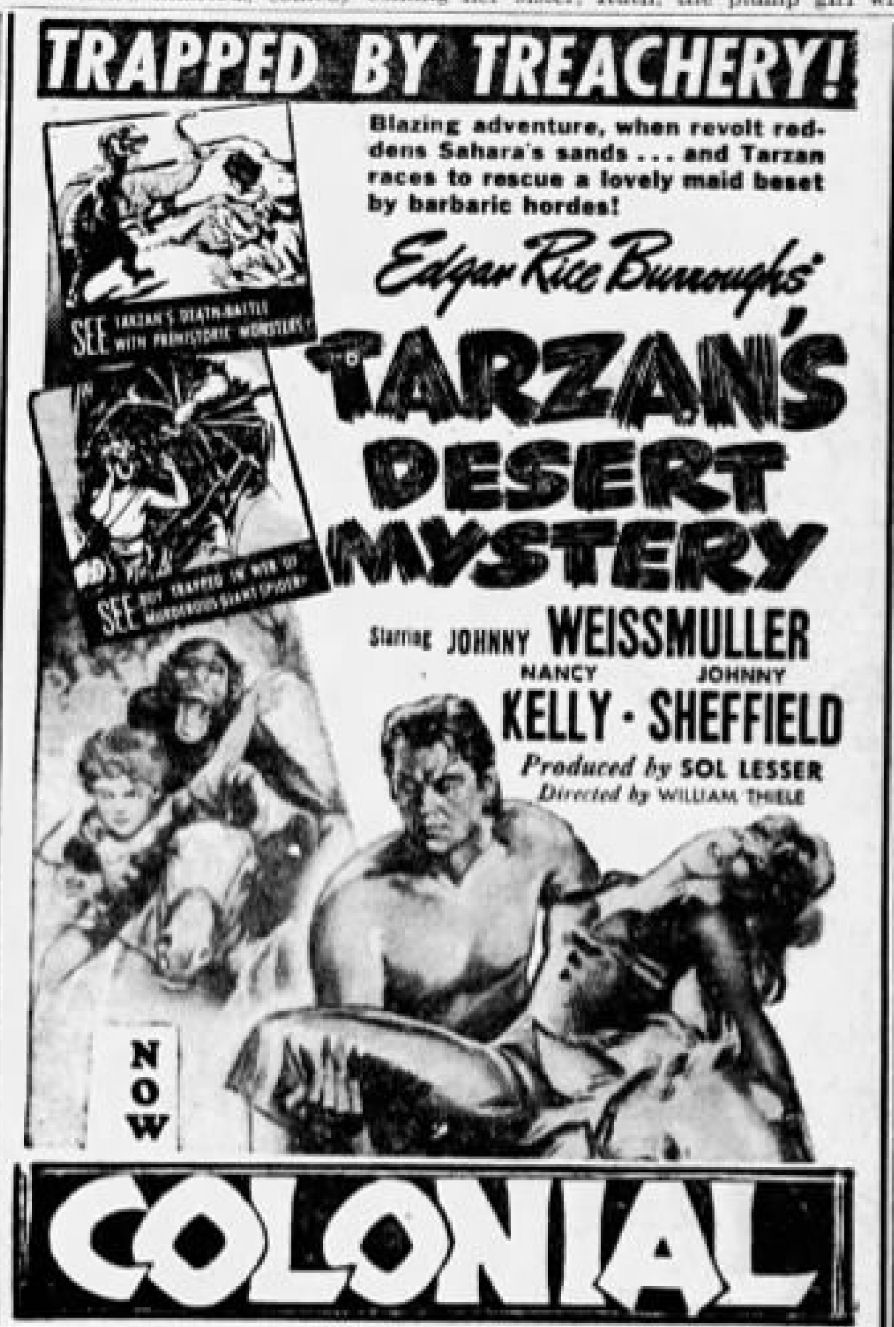
1943 newspaper ad

- Johnny Weissmuller as Tarzan
- Nancy Kelly as Connie Bryce
- Johnny Sheffield as Boy
- Otto Kruger as Paul Hendrix
- Joe Sawyer as Karl Straeder
- Lloyd Corrigan as Sheik Abdul El Khim
- Robert Lowery as Prince Selim
- Frank Puglia as Magistrate
- Philip Van Zandt as Kushmet
- Bobby Barber as Turban Vendor (uncredited)
- John Berkes as Charlie (uncredited)
- John Dehner as Prince Ameer (uncredited)
- Frank Faylen as Achmed (uncredited)
- George J. Lewis as Ali Baba Hassan (uncredited)
- Nestor Paiva as Prison Guard (uncredited)
- Syd Saylor as Bewildered Camel Herdsman (uncredited)

== Critical reception ==
A review of the film in Variety reported that it "doesn’t miss a thing with its quota of Nazi agents and gruesome animals, plus the usual Tarzan jungle scenes" and "is nicely paced and (the) photography highly effective." In the film's review in The New York Times, it was noted that "perhaps the small fry at least will be amused by people that behave like monkeys, and monkeys that behave like people," that the "sequence in which the luckless Nazi is crunched by the big spider should have the children screaming in their sleep for months to come," and "the desert and the swampy jungle—the latter infested by prehistoric monsters—are as close as adjoining rooms in this fabulous adventure."
