= Richard Aldrich (producer) =

American theatre producer (1902–1986)

- Born: Richard Stoddard Aldrich; August 17, 1902; Boston, Massachusetts, U.S.
- Died: March 31, 1986 (aged 83); Williamsburg, Virginia, U.S.
- Education: Harvard University
- Spouses: Helen Beals (m. 1927; div. 1936); Gertrude Lawrence (m. 1940; died 1952); Elizabeth Boyd (m. 1955)
- Children: 4

Richard Stoddard Aldrich (August 17, 1902 – March 31, 1986) was an American theatre producer, theatre manager, director, and diplomat. He was an officer with the United States Navy reserves during World War II and the Korean War, and a diplomat with the United States Foreign Operations Administration and International Cooperation Administration. He produced more than thirty plays on Broadway from 1933 through 1956, and also operated three summer theaters in Massachusetts. He was married to the actress Gertrude Lawrence until her death; their marriage was memorialized in his book Gertrude Lawrence as Mrs. A: An Intimate Biography of a Great Star (1955) and the Oscar nominated biographical musical film Star! (1968).

== Life and career ==
Aldrich was born in Boston, and graduated from Harvard University in 1925. At Harvard he served a term as president of the Harvard Radcliffe Dramatic Club and was a founding member of The Jitney Players in 1923. In 1926 he became general manager of Richard Boleslawski's American Laboratory Theatre. One of the first productions he oversaw was the play The Straw Hat (1926) which included music composed by a young Randall Thompson. A year later, in 1927, he married his first wife, Helen Beals, at Fifth Avenue Presbyterian Church. They later divorced in 1936 after having two sons, Richard Stoddard Aldrich Jr. and David Beals Aldrich.

Aldrich began his career on Broadway as a stage manager for a production of William Shakespeare's Twelfth Night in 1930. In 1933 he opened up a Broadway producing business with Alfred De Liagre. He produced 34 plays on Broadway from 1933 through 1956; including the original productions of The Devil and Daniel Webster (1939), Margin for Error (1939), Goodbye, My Fancy (1948), The Moon Is Blue (1951), and Dear Charles (1954). He also produced numerous Broadway revivals, including The Importance of Being Earnest (1939), The Playboy of the Western World (1946), Volpone (1948), Caesar and Cleopatra (1949), and The Devil's Disciple (1950). In 1945–1946 he produced a critically lauded tour to the United States by England's The Old Vic with Laurence Olivier and Ralph Richardson. This tour included Broadway revivals of Henry IV, Part 1, Henry IV, Part 2, Uncle Vanya, The Critic, and Oedipus Rex. He sponsored further tours to the United States by The Old Vic, and the repertory players of Israel's Habima Theatre and Ireland's Gate Theatre.

Aldrich directed the 1937 and 1938 summer festivals for the Central City Opera. He owned and operated three summer theatres in Massachusetts from the late 1930s through the mid 1950s: The Cape Playhouse in Dennis, the Falmouth Playhouse in Falmouth, and the Cape Cod Melody Tent in Hyannis. He also served as director for the summer festivals at the Falmouth Playhouse (1949–1955) and the Cape Cod Melody Tent (1950–1955). Aldrich was also a board member of the American National Theater and Academy (ANTA) and New York City Center. In collaboration with John Shubert and Broadway executive Warren Caro, he played an instrumental leadership role in designing and establishing the ANTA's "Forty Theatre Circuit Plan" in 1955; a plan designed to bring high quality American plays with critically established performers to regional theaters throughout the United States.

In 1940, Aldrich married the actress Gertrude Lawrence and notably produced a celebrated revival of Pygmalion starring his wife in 1945. After her death from cancer in 1952, he wrote the book Gertrude Lawrence as Mrs. A: An Intimate Biography of a Great Star (published 1955, Greystone Press). He later served as an advisor for the 1968 biographical musical film Star! which was about Lawrence. In that film he was portrayed by the actor Richard Crenna and actress Julie Andrews played the role of Lawrence. The film was nominated for seven Academy Awards.

Aldrich served as an officer in the United States Navy reserves during World War II and the Korean War. He was made deputy director (later director) of the United States Foreign Operations Administration (USFOA) mission in Spain in 1955 (later the International Cooperation Administration, ICA) where he served under his friend and former Harvard University classmate John Davis Lodge (then United States Ambassador to Spain). He left that post in 1962 to serve in a similar position in Morocco, where he remained until his retirement in 1965.

In 1955, while on a diplomatic mission to Tangier, he married Elizabeth Boyd, a former model and sister of eventual University of California, Berkeley professor Julian C. Boyd. They had two daughters, Susan Poythress Aldrich and Mary Joy Aldrich. At the time of his death in 1986 at the age of 83, Aldrich was residing with his wife in East Dennis, Massachusetts. He died in Williamsburg, Virginia while visiting relatives.
