= Lillian Russell (film) =

1940 film by Irving Cummings

- Theatrical release poster
- Directed by: Irving Cummings
- Written by: William Anthony McGuire
- Produced by: Darryl F. Zanuck
- Starring: Alice Faye; Don Ameche; Henry Fonda; Edward Arnold
- Cinematography: Leon Shamroy
- Edited by: Walter Thompson
- Music by: David Buttolph (uncredited); Cyril J. Mockridge (uncredited); Alfred Newman (uncredited)
- Production company: 20th Century Fox
- Distributed by: 20th Century Fox
- Release date: May 24, 1940
- Running time: 127 minutes
- Country: United States
- Language: English

Lillian Russell is a 1940 American biographical film of the life of the singer and actress. The screenplay was by William Anthony McGuire. The film was directed by Irving Cummings and produced by Darryl F. Zanuck. It stars Alice Faye in the title role, Don Ameche, Henry Fonda and Edward Arnold as Diamond Jim Brady.

Richard Day and Joseph C. Wright were nominated for an Academy Award for Best Art Direction, Black-and-White.

== Plot ==
Helen Leonard has a beautiful voice. As she grows up, she trains to become an opera singer. Her instructor, however, informs her that her voice is pleasing, but not suitable for grand opera. Returning home one day, she and her grandmother are saved by a handsome young man, newspaperman Alexander Moore. Meanwhile, Helen's mother, Cynthia, has political aspirations, but receives only a handful of votes for mayor.

While singing one evening, Helen is overheard by vaudeville impresario Tony Pastor, who hires her to sing at his theater. She is given a new name, Lillian Russell, and quickly rises to fame as the toast of New York. As the years pass, Lillian becomes one of the most revered stars in America. She has many suitors, including financier Diamond Jim Brady, Jesse Lewisohn, and composer Edward Solomon. She eventually marries Edward and they move to London, where Gilbert and Sullivan are writing an operetta specially for her.

Alexander Moore returns and makes a contract with Lillian to write stories about her rise to fame. But tragedy soon strikes when Edward dies one evening while composing a song for her. Lillian cancels the interviews and makes an appearance in the show, singing the song her husband composed for her, "Blue Love Bird".

Lillian returns to America and is, by this time, the greatest stage attraction of the century. Alexander comes to see Lillian after a new show and the two are happily reunited.

The plot takes many liberties with the facts, in particular giving her only two husbands instead of four.

== Cast ==
- Alice Faye as Lillian Russell
- Don Ameche as Edward Solomon
- Henry Fonda as Alexander Moore
- Edward Arnold as Diamond Jim Brady
- Warren William as The Famous J.L.
- Leo Carrillo as Tony Pastor
- Helen Westley as Grandma Leonard
- Dorothy Peterson as Cynthia Leonard
- Ernest Truex as Charles K. Leonard
- Nigel Bruce as William Gilbert
- Lynn Bari as Edna McCauley
- Claud Allister as Arthur Sullivan (as Claude Allister)
- Joe Weber as Joe Weber (as Weber)
- Lew Fields as Lew Field (as Fields)
- Eddie Foy Jr. as Eddie Foy Sr.
- Una O'Connor as Marie
- Joseph Cawthorn as Leopold Damrosch
- Diane Fisher as Dorothy
- Elyse Knox as Lillian Russell's Sister
- Joan Valerie as Lillian Russell's Sister
- Alice Armand as Lillian Russell's Sister
- William B. Davidson as President Cleveland (as William Davidson)
- Hal K. Dawson as Chauffeur
- Charles Halton as Dr' Dobbins
- Robert Emmett Keane as Jeweler
- Harry Hayden as Mr. Sloane
- Frank Darien as Coachman
- Frank Sully as Hank
- Ottola Nesmith as Miss Smyth
- Ferike Boros as Mrs. Rose
- Robert Homans as Stage Doorman
- William Haade as Soldier
- Irving Bacon as Soldier
- Paul E. Burns as Soldier (as Paul Burns)
- Cecil Cunningham as Mrs. Hobbs

== Songs ==
Many songs originally made famous in the 1890s and 1900s were used for the film, including "The Band Played On", "Come Down Ma Evenin' Star", "Ma Blushin' Rosie" and "After the Ball". Several new songs were also written for the film, including "Adored One" and most notably, "Blue Love Bird", composed by Gus Kahn and Bronisław Kaper.

== See also ==
- Diamond Jim, a 1935 film starring Edward Arnold, again as Jim Brady
