= American National Theater and Academy =

Nonprofit theater company and school

- Formation: 1935
- Founder: United States Congress
- Dissolved: 2012
- Type: Theatre group and acting school
- Location: New York City

The American National Theatre and Academy (ANTA) is a non-profit theatre producer and training organization that was established in 1935 to be the official United States national theatre that would be an alternative to the for-profit Broadway houses of the day.

The ANTA, which by law was to be self-sustaining, sponsored touring companies of numerous shows to foreign countries in the post-World War II in the 1940s and 1950s, owned the ANTA Theatre on Broadway, played an important role in the establishment of the Vivian Beaumont Theater in Lincoln Center, was the main membership organization for regional theatre in the U.S. before ultimately having a greatly diminished role in the 1980s. Today as an entity its main focus is the National Theatre Conservatory at the Denver Center for the Performing Arts.

== History ==
It was established by Congress in 1935 at the same time as the Federal Theatre Project. Its mission was to set up a theatre for the whole country. It sponsored architectural contests to build the theatre but its mission was overshadowed by the controversy enveloping the Federal Theatre which some considered too liberal.

The group holds a congressional charter under Title 36 of the United States Code.

After World War II, it reorganized and initially sponsored U.S. shows that toured abroad.

In 1950 it bought the Guild Theatre, a Broadway theater, and renamed it the ANTA Playhouse. President Harry S. Truman dedicated the rechristened theatre. The ANTA, under chairman Robert W. Dowling, announced plans to use the theatre bring regional theatre productions into New York City.

In 1955, under the leadership of Richard Aldrich, Warren Caro, and John Shubert, the ANTA announced the "Forty Theatre Circuit Plan" involving the 40 largest regional theatres across the country, stating that "ANTA's primary task is to bring the best plays, interpreted by the best actors, at minimum cost to the nation." Plans called for construction of new theatres across the country and touring companies.

However ANTA had problems raising funds for the project and regional theatres objected as they had no formal representation on the ANTA board. In fact the board consisted largely of New York City theatre owners.

In the early 1960s it established the ANTA Washington Square Theatre as the home for the home of the planned theatre company that was to occupy the Vivian Beaumont Theater. ANTA was to produce its most successful plays there including Man of La Mancha as well as Arthur Miller's plays After the Fall and Incident At Vichy.

ANTA leased its Broadway house for commercial productions in the 1970s and sold it in 1981.

In 1965 the League of Resident Theatres was founded to represent the regional theatres.

In 1984, the ANTA started the National Theatre Conservatory in Denver, Colorado.
