= Stanley and Livingstone =

1939 film by Henry King, Otto Brower

- Theatrical release poster
- Directed by: Henry King; Otto Brower (safari sequences)
- Written by: Philip Dunne; Julien Josephson
- Produced by: Darryl F. Zanuck; Kenneth Macgowan (associate producer)
- Starring: Spencer Tracy; Nancy Kelly; Richard Greene
- Cinematography: George Barnes; Sidney Wagner (safari sequences)
- Edited by: Barbara McLean
- Music by: R.H. Bassett (uncredited); Robert Russell Bennett (uncredited); David Buttolph (uncredited); Cyril J. Mockridge (uncredited); David Raksin (uncredited); Rudy Schrager (uncredited); Louis Silvers (uncredited)
- Production company: 20th Century Fox
- Distributed by: 20th Century Fox
- Release date: August 18, 1939
- Running time: 101 minutes
- Country: United States
- Language: English
- Budget: $1,338,000

Stanley and Livingstone is a 1939 American adventure film directed by Henry King and Otto Brower. It is loosely based on the true story of Welsh reporter Sir Henry M. Stanley's quest to find Dr. David Livingstone, a Scottish missionary presumed lost in Africa, whom he finally met on November 10, 1871. Spencer Tracy plays Stanley, while Cedric Hardwicke portrays Livingstone. Other cast members include Nancy Kelly, Richard Greene, Walter Brennan, Charles Coburn and Henry Hull.

== Plot ==
Henry Stanley is a fearless newspaper reporter ready to do whatever it takes to get a story, no matter how dangerous. Colonel Grimes tells two peace commissioners sent from Washington DC that he cannot permit them to try to contact the Indians of the Wyoming Territory of 1870, as it would be suicidal, only to have Stanley emerge from the wilderness, escorted by a band of the natives and his guide, Jeff Slocum.

When Stanley returns to New York City, his employer, New York Herald publisher James Gordon Bennett Jr., gives him another near-impossible assignment. The London Globe has announced that an expedition headed by Gareth Tyce, the son of the Globe's publisher, Lord Tyce, has verified that world-renowned missionary David Livingstone is dead. Bennett does not believe it, and would relish embarrassing his rival by proving the story wrong. It is a daunting task, searching the mostly unmapped interior of the "dark continent" for one man, but Stanley accepts the challenge.

On the boat trip to Zanzibar, Stanley makes a very unfavorable impression on fellow passenger Lord Tyce. Stanley meets Eve Kingsley and her father, John Kingsley, the temporary head of the British authorities in Zanzibar. Eve has been seeing Gareth Tyce, recovering from his ordeal, in the hope of getting him to persuade his father to use his influence to have her father reassigned to a more healthy posting back in England. Eve warns Stanley about the dangers of Africa, but he is undeterred.

He, Slocum and a band of native bearers set out into uncharted territory. Months pass with no sign of hope, and Stanley's resolve begins to waver. He also realizes he is in love with Eve. Finally, however, two hunters tell him of a white man they call "doctor" in a village beside Lake Tanganyika. Though feverish, Stanley gets them to guide him there. He sees a white man waiting to greet him. "Dr. Livingstone ... I presume", Stanley hesitantly inquires. It is indeed he.

For several months, Stanley recuperates and follows Livingstone around on his work. The cynical reporter is greatly changed by the experience. Finally, though, he returns to England, bearing Livingstone's plea for assistance. Upon his arrival in London, he is met by Eve, only to discover she is now happily married to Gareth.

When Lord Tyce openly suggests that Stanley fabricated everything, Stanley presents Livingstone's maps and documents to the British Geographical Society for examination and judgment. Despite his heartfelt speech, it is clear to Stanley that too few of the members believe him. As he is leaving the hall, a messenger arrives with news that another expedition has recovered Livingstone's body, as well as the man's last written message, in which he talks glowingly of Stanley. Vindicated, Stanley decides to return to Africa to carry on the great man's work.

== Cast ==
- Spencer Tracy as Henry M. Stanley
- Nancy Kelly as Eve Kingsley
- Richard Greene as Gareth Tyce
- Walter Brennan as Jeff Slocum
- Charles Coburn as Lord Tyce
- Cedric Hardwicke as Dr. David Livingstone
- Henry Hull as James Gordon Bennett, Jr.
- Henry Travers as John Kingsley
- Miles Mander as Sir John Gresham
- David Torrence as Mr. Cranston
- Holmes Herbert as Sir Frederick Holcomb
- C. Montague Shaw as Sir Oliver French (as Montague Shaw)
- Brandon Hurst as Sir Henry Forrester
- Hassan Said as Hassan
- Paul Harvey as Colonel Grimes
- Russell Hicks as Peace Commissioner
- Frank Dae as Peace Commissioner

== Production ==
According to Philip Dunne, the film was originally envisioned as a vehicle for Tyrone Power as Stanley with the script prepared accordingly. Darryl F. Zanuck, head of production at 20th Century Fox was sent a memo suggesting the project be changed to be about a more cynical Stanley who looks for Livingstone as a publicity stunt, then becomes idealistic after meeting him. Zanuck agreed and got Dunne and Julien Josephson to rewrite it.

Dunne later recalled: "Every time Spencer Tracy as the reporter said, 'Dr. Livingstone, I presume,' he started to laugh hysterically, to roll around the studio floor. And Cedric Hardwicke, as the missionary, laughed so hard tears rolled down his cheeks. We did it as an aside, we had to."

The safari sequences were shot in Kenya, Tanzania, and Uganda. The American scenes set in Wyoming were shot in Sun Valley, Idaho.
