= Tail Spin =

1939 film by Roy Del Ruth

- Theatrical film poster
- Directed by: Roy Del Ruth
- Written by: Frank Wead
- Based on: Women with Wings: A Novel of the Modern Day Aviatrix; 1935 novel by Genevieve Haugen
- Produced by: Darryl F. Zanuck
- Starring: Alice Faye; Constance Bennett; Nancy Kelly; Joan Davis; Charles Farrell; Jane Wyman
- Cinematography: Karl Freund
- Edited by: Allen McNeil
- Music by: Louis Silvers
- Production company: Twentieth Century-Fox Film Corporation
- Distributed by: Twentieth Century-Fox Film Corporation
- Release date: February 19, 1939
- Running time: 84 min.
- Country: United States
- Language: English

Tail Spin (also known as Tailspin) is a 1939 aviation film. The screenplay was written by Frank Wead and directed by Roy Del Ruth. It was based on the book, Women with Wings: A novel of the modern day aviatrix (Ganesha Publishing, 1935), authored by Genevieve Haugen, who was also an advisor and stunt pilot in the film. Tail Spin starred Alice Faye, Constance Bennett, Nancy Kelly, Joan Davis, Charles Farrell and Jane Wyman.

== Plot ==
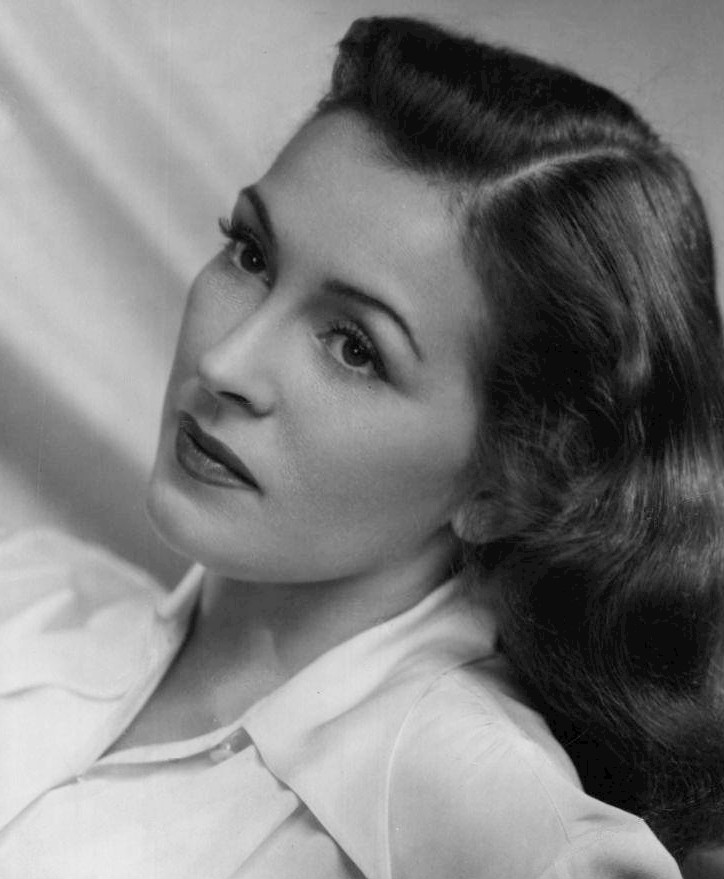
Nancy Kelly

Trixie Lee (Alice Faye) takes a leave of absence from her job as a Hollywood hat-check girl to pursue her career as an aviatrix. She and partner Babe Dugan (Joan Davis) enter an air race from Los Angeles to Cleveland, but an oil leak causes their aircraft to crash.

Navy flyer Tex Price (Kane Richmond) helps with their engine. Meanwhile, steel mogul T.P. Lester (Harry Davenport) indulges the ambition of his daughter Gerry (Constance Bennett) to fly in the Powder Puff national race. Gerry is also Tex's ex.

Trixie wants to win both Tex and the race, so she and Babe do everything they can to discourage Gerry or sabotage her chances. In the sky during the Powder Puff race, the superior aircraft Gerry owns is winning, but she pretends to have engine failure so Trixie can win.

Knowing that she misjudged Gerry all along, Trixie steps aside as Tex and Gerry get back together.

== Cast ==
- Alice Faye as Trixie Lee
- Constance Bennett as Gerry Lester
- Nancy Kelly as Lois Allen
- Joan Davis as Babe Dugan
- Charles Farrell as Bud
- Jane Wyman as Alabama
- Kane Richmond as Lt. Dick "Tex" Price
- Wally Vernon as Chick
- Joan Valerie as Sunny
- Edward Norris as Speed Allen
- J. Anthony Hughes as Al Moore
- Harry Davenport as T. P. Lester
- Mary Gordon as Mrs. Lee
- Adrian Morris as Repo Man

== Production ==
Tail Spin centered on the "Powder Puff Derby" that was part of the 1939 Cleveland Air Races. Some of the crashes in the race were incorporated in the production. The aerial photography was directed by noted Hollywood film pilot Paul Mantz.

== Reception ==
In order to publicize Tail Spin, the studio sent a bevy of starlets that accompanied a group of women flyers on a tour of 25 key cities. In his review for The New York Times, Frank S. Nugent saw a winning formula, "... thoroughly competent job of movie-making. It is constructed on a simple formula: every time the picture is about to crash, Mr. Zanuck crashes a couple of planes instead. And, though in retrospect the story seems to be strewn with the wreckage from these artistic emergencies, what possible solution to any dramatic imbroglio could be quicker and cleaner to the participants, more exciting or more spectacular to the onlookers than a good old-fashioned airplane crash?" He also knew that the attraction of women pilots would be a hit with audiences.

Film critic Leonard Maltin's later review was more critical, "Hackneyed saga of female flyers, with Faye (in a change-of-pace role) having to scrounge for pennies and face competition from socialite/aviatrix Bennett. Written by Frank "Spig" Wead."
