= Warren Caro =

American theatre executive and lawyer

Warren Caro (24 February 1907 − 1 January 1995) was an American theatre executive and lawyer. He was the executive director of the Theatre Guild from 1946 through 1967, and director of theater operations and projects development director for The Shubert Organization from 1967 through 1980. He was at one time the chairman of the American Academy of Dramatic Arts, and served on the advisory committee for the establishment of the John F. Kennedy Center for the Performing Arts.

== Life and career ==
Born in Brooklyn, Caro was educated at Cornell University; earning both a bachelor's degree and a law degree from that institution. He worked for ten years as a lawyer in New York City before becoming a theater executive.

Caro was the executive director of the Theatre Guild from 1946 through 1967. That organization was awarded two Special Tony Awards (both of which were presented to Caro); largely resulting from Caro's work creating the American Theatre Society National Subscription Program (ATSNSP), the American Theatre Guild Repertory Company, and establishing a Theatre Guild anthology play series for television, The United States Steel Hour. The ATSNSP toured Broadway productions to 21 cities throughout North America with a subscription base. It was the first program to use a subscription series for touring Broadway productions on national tour; a model that has sense been widely replicated. He was a top executive with The Shubert Organization from 1967 through 1980; serving as director of theater operations and projects development director.

Caro was one of the American delegates and charter signers for the establishment of the United Nations's International Theatre Institute in 1948. He was a member of the advisory committee for the establishment of the John F. Kennedy Center for the Performing Arts. In collaboration with John Shubert and Broadway producer Richard Aldrich, he played an instrumental leadership role in designing and establishing the American National Theater and Academy's e "Forty Theatre Circuit Plan" in 1955; a plan designed to bring high quality American plays with critically established performers to regional theaters throughout the United States. He also served a tenure as chairman of the American Academy of Dramatic Arts.

Married three times, Caro's second marriage was to actress Nancy Kelly in 1955. They had one daughter, Kelly Caro-Rosenberg, and divorced in 1968. he died on New Year’s Day 1995 a day before his wife died who he divorced years before.
