= Alexander's Ragtime Band (film) =

1938 film by Henry King

- Theatrical release poster
- Directed by: Henry King
- Written by: Irving Berlin; Richard Sherman
- Screenplay by: Kathryn Scola; Lamar Trotti
- Produced by: Harry Joe Brown (associate producer)
- Starring: Tyrone Power; Alice Faye; Don Ameche; Ethel Merman; Jack Haley; Jean Hersholt; Helen Westley; John Carradine; Paul Hurst; Wally Vernon; Ruth Terry; Douglas Fowley; Chick Chandler; Eddie Collins
- Cinematography: J. Peverell Marley
- Edited by: Barbara McLean
- Music by: Irving Berlin; Alfred Newman
- Distributed by: 20th Century Fox
- Release dates: August 5, 1938 (New York, premiere)
- Running time: 106 minutes
- Country: United States
- Language: English
- Budget: $1,200,000–$2,275,000
- Box office: $3.6 million (worldwide rentals)

Alexander's Ragtime Band is a 1938 American musical film released by 20th Century Fox that takes its name from the 1911 Irving Berlin song "Alexander's Ragtime Band" to tell a story of a society boy who scandalizes his family by pursuing a career in ragtime instead of "serious" music. The film generally traces the history of jazz music from the popularization of Ragtime in the early years of the 20th century to the acceptance of swing as an art form in the late 1930s using music composed by Berlin. The story spans more than two decades from the 1911 release of its name-sake song to some point in time after the 1933 release of "Heat Wave", presumably 1938.

It stars Tyrone Power, Alice Faye, Don Ameche, Ethel Merman, Jack Haley and Jean Hersholt. Several actual events in the history of jazz are fictionalized and adapted to the story including the tour of Europe by Original Dixieland Jass Band, the global spread of jazz by U.S. soldiers during World War I, and the 1938 Carnegie Hall performance by The Benny Goodman Orchestra.

The story was written by Berlin himself, with Kathryn Scola, Richard Sherman (1905–1962) and Lamar Trotti. In 1944, a federal judge ruled that most of the story by Berlin and collaborating writers had been plagiarized from a 1937 manuscript by author Marie Dieckhaus, but that decision was reversed on appeal.

Alexander's Ragtime Band was 20th Century Fox's highest-grossing film of the 1930s and was nominated for six Academy Awards, winning the award for Best Music, Scoring.

== Cast ==
- Tyrone Power as Roger Grant, a.k.a. Alexander
- Alice Faye as Stella Kirby
- Don Ameche as Charlie Dwyer
- Ethel Merman as Jerry Allen
- Jack Haley as Davey Lane
- Jean Hersholt as Professor Heinrich
- Helen Westley as Aunt Sophie
- John Carradine as Taxi Driver
- Paul Hurst as Bill
- Douglas Fowley as Snapper
- Chick Chandler as Louie
- Eddie Collins as Corporal Collins
- Joseph Crehan as Stage Manager
- Wally Vernon as Himself
- Ruth Terry as Ruby
- Robert Gleckler as Eddie
- Charles Coleman as Head Waiter
- Stanley Andrews as Colonel
- Selmer Jackson as Radio Station Manager
- Charles Williams as Agent
- Carol Adams as Hat Check Girl
- Tyler Brooke as Assistant Stage Manager
- Lon Chaney Jr. as Photographer on Stage
- Ken Darby as Army Quartet Member
- Ralph Dunn as Army Captain
- James Flavin as Army Captain
- Harold Goodwin as Military Policeman at Army Show
- Rondo Hatton as Barfly
- Edward Keane as Army Major
- King's Men as Singing Army Quartet – Y.M.C.A.
- Robert Lowery as Reporter
- James C. Morton as Bartender at Scarbie's
- Frank O'Connor as Officer in Army Show Audience
- Edwin Stanley as Critic in Army Show Audience
- Charles Tannen as Dillingham's secretary

== Songs ==
Alexander's Ragtime Band features several hit songs by Irving Berlin including "Heat Wave", "Some Sunny Day", "Blue Skies", "Easter Parade", "A Pretty Girl Is Like a Melody" and "Alexander's Ragtime Band". Previously released songs were re-arranged and used in the film along with new songs written by Berlin, notably "Now It Can Be Told".

== Reception ==
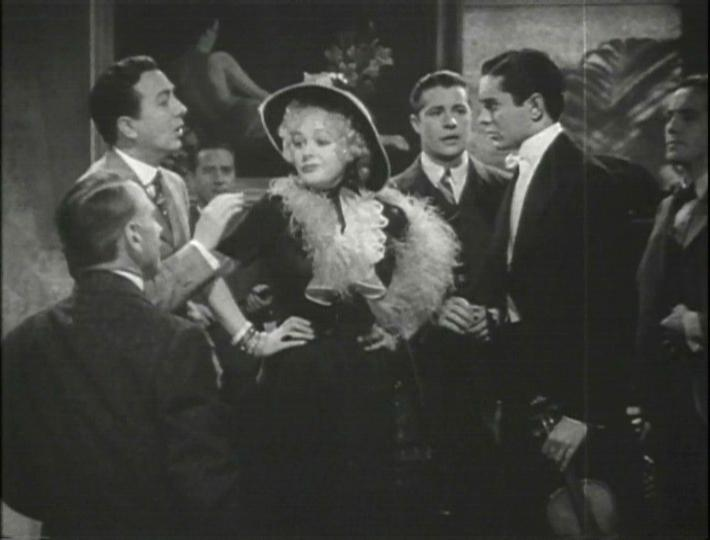
From left to right: Jack Haley, Alice Faye, Don Ameche, Tyrone Power.

The film had its New York premiere at the Roxy Theatre on August 5, 1938, with Cuban bandleader Desi Arnaz heading the stage show.

Contemporary reviews from critics were positive. Frank S. Nugent of The New York Times wrote, "With those twenty-six Berlin tunes at its disposal and with such assured song-pluggers as Alice Faye and Ethel Merman to put them over, the picture simply runs roughshod over minor critical objection and demands recognition as the best musical show of the year." Variety wrote, "Superlative in conception, execution and showmanship, it provides a rare theatrical and emotional experience." Film Daily declared it "solid entertainment that should play to big returns." Harrison's Reports called it "Excellent entertainment, capably directed and acted." Russell Maloney of The New Yorker called the music "reason enough to see the film," though he criticized the "small, persistent, mosquitolike irritation of the plot" and instances of anachronistic dialogue.

At the time of its release, Alexander's Ragtime Band was 20th Century Fox's highest-grossing film ever with $2.63 million in domestic rentals and $3.6 million in worldwide rentals.

== Plagiarism lawsuit ==
In 1937, composer Irving Berlin had been approached by 20th Century Fox to write a story treatment for an upcoming film entitled "Alexander's Ragtime Band." Berlin agreed to write a story outline for the film which would feature many of Berlin's signature tunes. Released on August 5, 1938, Alexander's Ragtime Band was a smash hit with audiences and grossed in excess of five million dollars. However, soon after, a plagiarism lawsuit was filed by author Marie Cooper Dieckhaus against Berlin and 20th Century Fox. In 1944, a federal judge ruled in Dieckhaus' favor that Berlin and collaborating writers had plagiarized a 1937 manuscript by Dieckhaus and used many of its elements.

In 1937, Dieckhaus had submitted her manuscript to various Hollywood studio heads, literary agents, and other individuals for their perusal. The trial court ruled that much of her manuscript's plot was included in the film's screenplay. However, in 1946, this ruling was reversed on appeal because there was no evidence that Berlin and the others who worked on the film had ever seen Dieckhaus's manuscript.

== Awards and honors ==
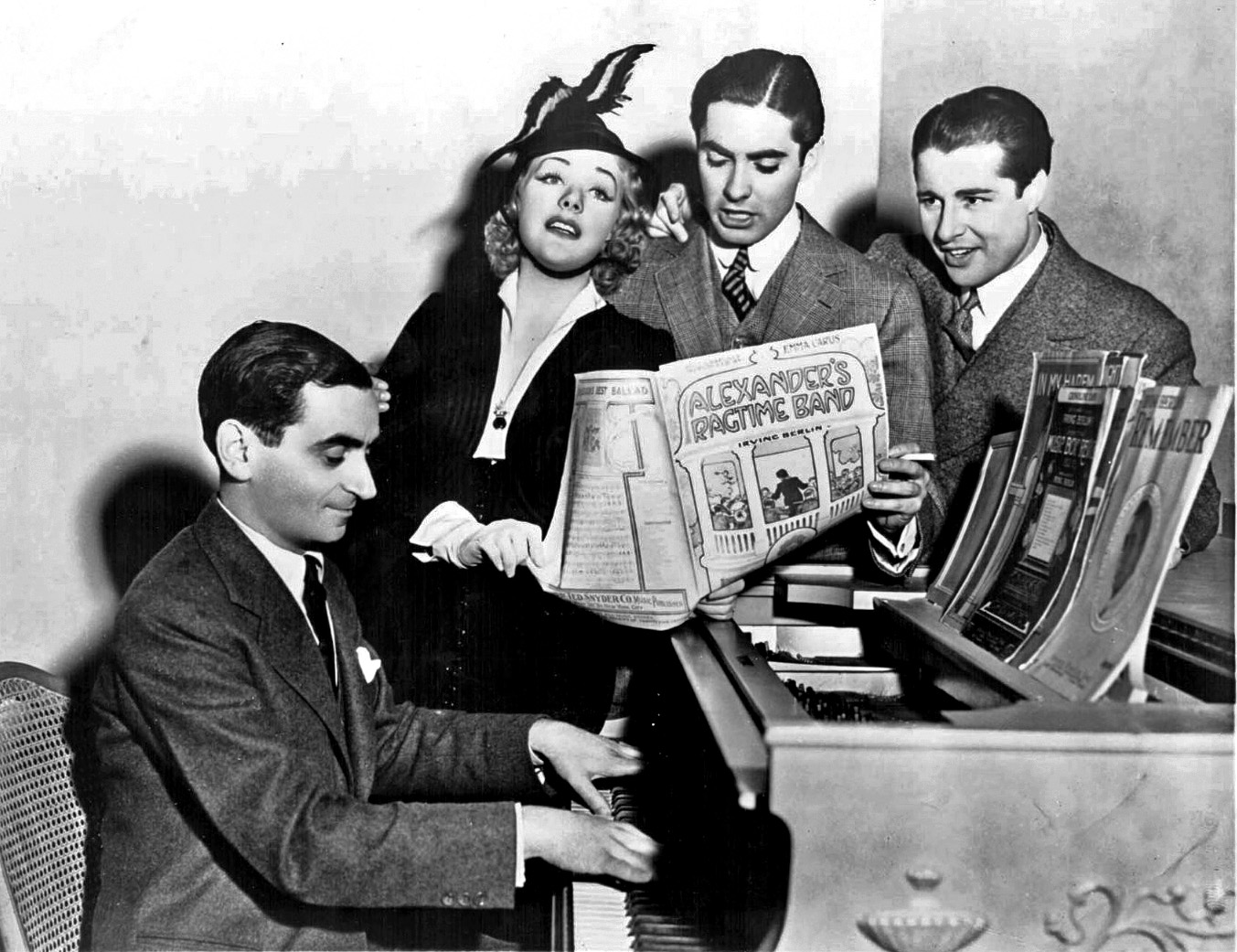
Irving Berlin with actors Tyrone Power, Alice Faye, and Don Ameche on the set of the 1938 film.

Alfred Newman won an Academy Award for Best Music, Scoring. The film was also nominated for:

- Best Picture (Outstanding Production)
- Story – Irving Berlin
- Song – Irving Berlin for "Now It Can Be Told"
- Art Direction – Bernard Herzbrun and Boris Leven
- Film Editing – Barbara McLean

== Radio adaptations ==
Alexander's Ragtime Band was presented as a one-hour radio adaptation on two occasions on Lux Radio Theatre. The first broadcast was on June 3, 1940. This adaptation starred Faye and Robert Preston. The second broadcast was on April 7, 1947, and starred Tyrone Power, Margaret Whiting, Al Jolson, Dick Haymes and Dinah Shore. "A Birthday Tribute to Irving Berlin," an all-star celebration of Berlin's 50th birthday, broadcast on CBS on August 3, 1938, from New York, Hollywood, and Chicago, was coordinated with the premiere of the Fox film and concluded with a truncated dramatization of scenes from the film. Parts were read by Ethel Merman and Tyrone Power.
