= Alice Faye =

American actress and singer (1915–1998)

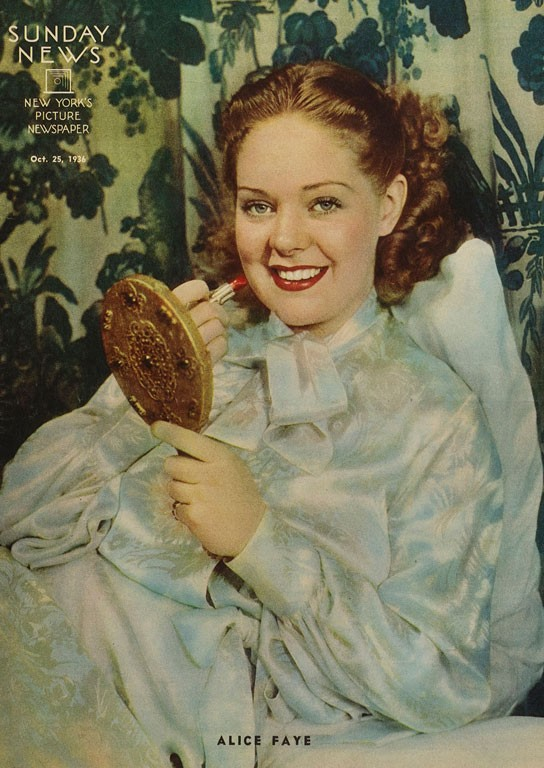
- Faye in 1936
- Born: Alice Jeanne Leppert; May 5, 1915; New York City, U.S.
- Died: May 9, 1998 (aged 83); Rancho Mirage, California, U.S.
- Resting place: Forest Lawn Cemetery
- Occupations: Actress; singer
- Years active: 1931–1995
- Known for: Alexander's Ragtime Band; Hello, Frisco, Hello; In Old Chicago; Rose of Washington Square; Lillian Russell
- Spouses: Tony Martin (m. 1937; div. 1940) Phil Harris (m. 1941; died 1995)
- Children: 2
- Awards: Hollywood Walk of Fame
- Website: alicefaye.com

Alice Faye (born Alice Jeanne Leppert; May 5, 1915 – May 9, 1998) was an American actress and singer. A musical star of 20th Century-Fox in the 1930s and 1940s, Faye starred in such films as On the Avenue (1937) and Alexander's Ragtime Band (1938). She is often associated with the Academy Award–winning standard "You'll Never Know", which she introduced in the 1943 musical film Hello, Frisco, Hello.

She left her career as a film actress and became known for her role on the radio show The Phil Harris-Alice Faye Show.

== Life and career ==
=== 1915–1933: Early life and career beginnings ===
Alice Jeanne Leppert was born on May 5, 1915, in Hell's Kitchen, Manhattan, the daughter of Alice (née Moffit), who worked for the Mirror Chocolate Company, and Charles Leppert, a police officer. She had an older brother, Charles. Faye was raised an Episcopalian. Faye's entertainment career began in vaudeville as a chorus girl. She failed an audition for The Earl Carroll Vanities when she was found to be too young. She then moved to Broadway and secured a featured role in the 1931 edition of George White's Scandals. By this time, Faye had adopted her stage name and first reached a radio audience on Rudy Vallée's The Fleischmann's Yeast Hour.

=== 1934–1938: Early work ===
Faye gained her first major film break in 1934, when Lilian Harvey abandoned the lead role in a film version of George White's Scandals (1934 film), in which Vallee was also to appear. Hired first to perform a musical number with Vallee, Faye ended up as the female lead. She became a popular film star for audiences of the 1930s, particularly when Fox production head Darryl F. Zanuck made her his protégée. He softened Faye from a wisecracking showgirl to a youthful, and yet somewhat motherly figure, such as her roles in a few Shirley Temple films. Faye received a physical makeover, going from a version of Jean Harlow to a wholesome appearance, in which her platinum hair and pencil-line eyebrows were swapped for a more natural look.

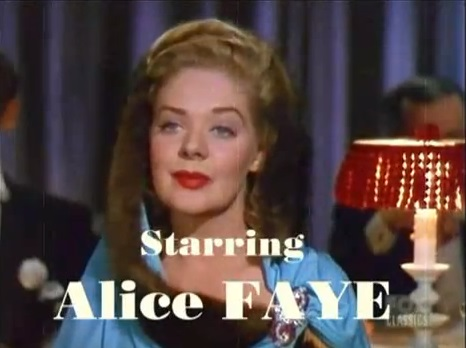
Alice Faye in That Night in Rio (1941)

Faye was cast as the female lead in In Old Chicago (1938). Zanuck initially resisted casting Faye, as the role had been written for Jean Harlow, but critics applauded Faye's performance. The film contained a 20-minute finale, a recreation of the Great Chicago Fire, a scene so dangerous that women, except for the main stars, were banned from the set. In the film, she appeared with two of her most frequent co-stars, Tyrone Power and Don Ameche, as it was customary for studios to pair their contract players together in more than one film.

Faye, Power, and Ameche were reunited for the 1938 release Alexander's Ragtime Band, which was designed to showcase more than 20 Irving Berlin songs; Faye again received strong reviews. One of the most expensive films of its time, it also became one of the most successful musicals of the 1930s.

=== 1939–1940 ===
By 1939, Faye was named one of the top-10 box-office draws in Hollywood. That year, she made Rose of Washington Square with Tyrone Power. Although a big hit, the film was supposedly based on the real life of comedian Fanny Brice, who sued Fox for stealing her story.

Because of her bankable status, Fox occasionally placed Faye in films more for the sake of making money than showcasing Faye's talents. Films such as Tail Spin and Barricade (both 1939) were more dramatic than regular Faye films, and often did not contain any songs. Due to her immense popularity, though, none of the films that she made in the 1930s and 1940s lost money; this success garnered her the nickname "Queen of Fox".

One of Faye's most memorable parts was the title role in the musical biopic Lillian Russell (1940). Faye always named this film as one of her favorites, though it was also her most challenging role. The tight corsets Faye wore for this picture caused her to collapse on the set several times.

After declining the lead role in for Down Argentine Way (also 1940) because of an illness, Faye was replaced by the studio's newest musical star, Betty Grable. She was paired as a sister act opposite Grable in the film Tin Pan Alley (also 1940). During the making of the picture, a rumor arose that a rivalry had arisen between the two. In a Biography interview, Faye disclosed that the Fox publicity department built up the rumor, and that the two actresses were in fact close friends.

=== 1941–1995: Later work ===
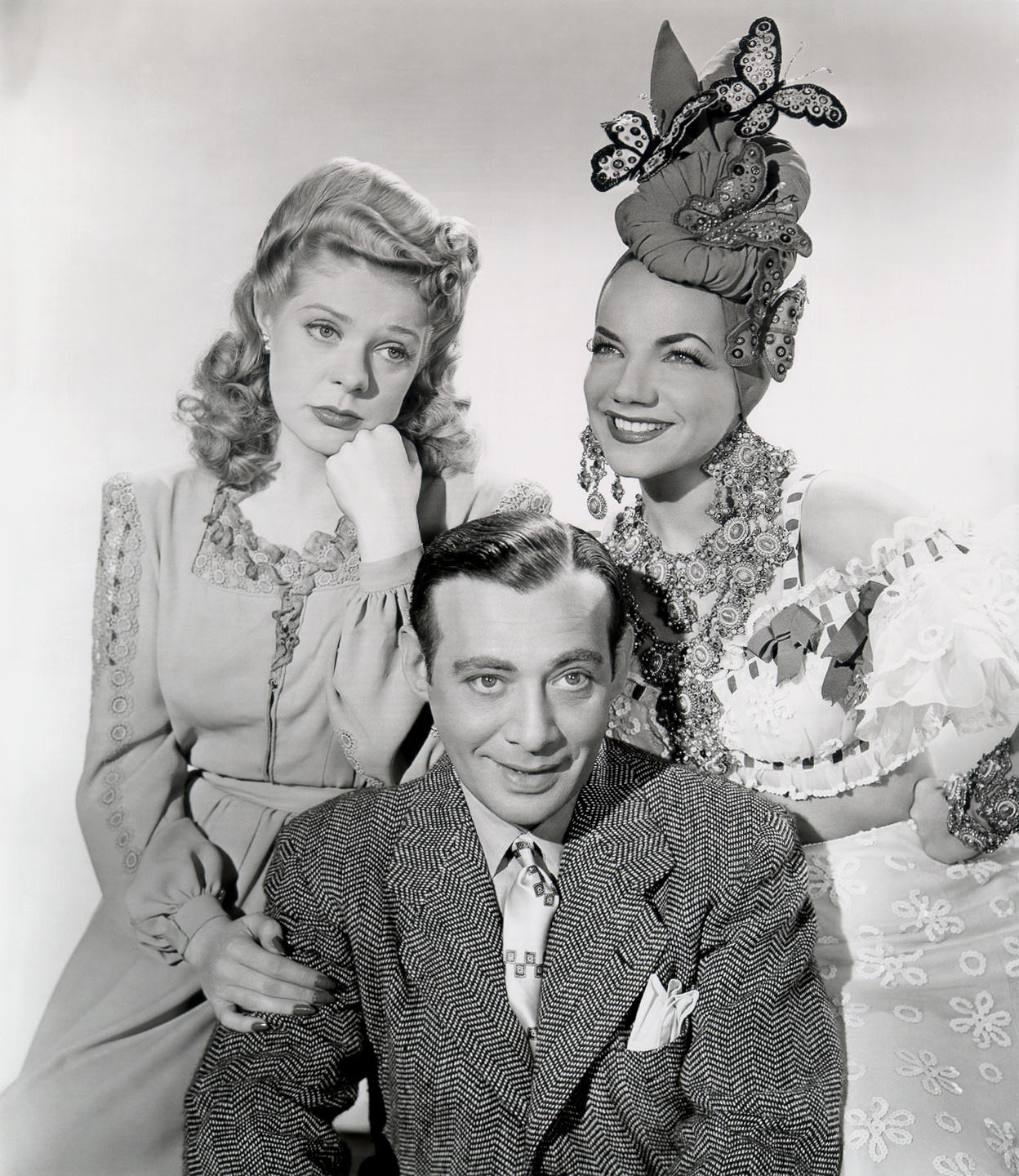
Alice Faye, Phil Baker, and Carmen Miranda in The Gang's All Here (1943)

In 1941, Fox began to place Faye in musicals photographed in Technicolor, a trademark for the studio in the 1940s. She frequently played a performer, often one moving up in society, allowing for situations that ranged from the poignant to the comic. Films such as Week-End in Havana (1941) and That Night in Rio (1941), in which she played a Brazilian aristocrat, made good use of Faye's husky singing voice, solid comic timing, and flair for carrying off the era's starry-eyed romantic story lines.

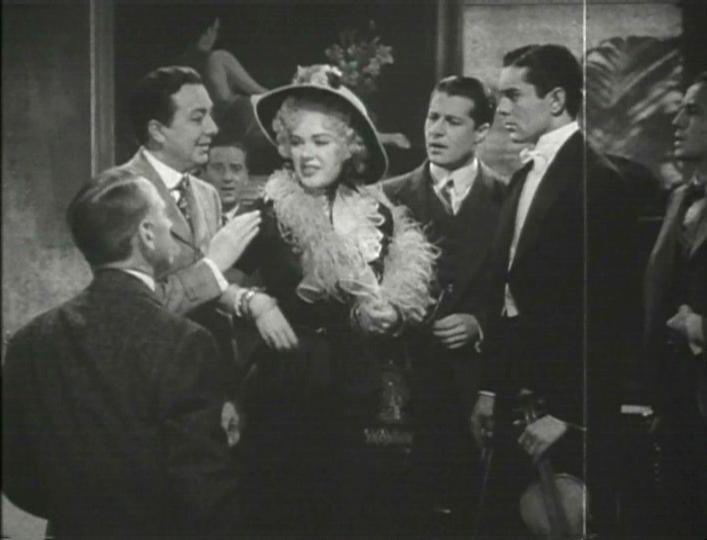
Alice Faye (center), Jack Haley (left), Don Ameche, and Tyrone Power (right), in a trailer for Alexander's Ragtime Band (1938)

In 1943, after taking a year off to have her first daughter, Faye starred in the Technicolor musical Hello, Frisco, Hello. Released during World War II, the film became one of her highest-grossing pictures for Fox. In this film, Faye sang "You'll Never Know". The song won the Academy Award for Best Original Song for 1943, and the sheet music for the song sold over a million copies. Since a clause in her contract (as was the case with most other Fox stars) stated that she could not officially record any of her movie songs, other singers, such as Dick Haymes (whose version hit number one for four weeks), Frank Sinatra, and Rosemary Clooney have been more associated with the song than Faye. However, it is still often considered Faye's signature song. That year, Faye was once again named one of the top box-office draws in the world.

== End of motion picture career ==
As Faye's star continued to ascend during the war years, family life became more important to her, especially with the arrival of a second daughter, Phyllis. After her birth, Faye signed a new contract with Fox to make only one picture a year, with the option of a second one, to give Faye a chance to spend more time with her family. Her second pregnancy resulted in a hospitalization, forcing her to surrender a plum dramatic role in A Tree Grows in Brooklyn to Joan Blondell, and she declined a musical role in The Dolly Sisters (her intended part went to June Haver).

Faye finally accepted the lead role in Fallen Angel (1945). Although designed ostensibly as Faye's vehicle, Zanuck tried to build his new protégée Linda Darnell, ordering many of Faye's scenes cut and those of Darnell's emphasized. When Faye saw a screening of the final cut—with her role reduced by 12 scenes and a song number—she wrote a scathing note to Zanuck, went straight to her car, gave her dressing room keys to the studio gate guard, and drove home, vowing never to return to Fox. Faye was still so popular that thousands of letters were sent to Faye's home and the Fox studios from around the world, begging her to return for another picture. In 1987, she told an interviewer, "When I stopped making pictures, it didn't bother me because there were so many things I hadn't done. I had never learned to run a house. I didn't know how to cook. I didn't know how to shop. So all these things filled all those gaps."

After Fallen Angel, Faye's contract called for her to make two more movies. Zanuck hit back by having her blackballed for breach of contract, effectively ending her film career, although Faye no longer cared to pursue it. Fallen Angel was Faye's last starring film. Zanuck, under public pressure, tried to lure Faye back onto the screen; Faye returned all the scripts.

Alice Faye did return to Fox later, for a character role in a remake of an old Fox property, State Fair (1962). While she received good reviews, the film was not a success. She made only infrequent cameo appearances in films thereafter, playing a secretary in Won Ton Ton, the Dog Who Saved Hollywood (1976) and in The Magic of Lassie (1978) as a waitress.

Faye was the subject of This Is Your Life for British television in 1984, when she was surprised by Eamonn Andrews at Hollywood's Metromedia Studios.

== Marriage and radio career ==
Faye's first marriage, to Tony Martin in 1937, ended in divorce in 1940; both had busy careers that made it difficult for them to have opportunities for togetherness. In May 1941, she married bandleader Phil Harris. Their marriage, one of the most successful in Hollywood, became a plotline in the hit radio comedy, The Jack Benny Program, where for 16 years Harris was a regular cast member.

The couple had two daughters along with Harris's adopted son from his first marriage. Faye and Harris began working in radio together as Faye's film career declined. First, they teamed to host a variety show on NBC, The Fitch Bandwagon, in 1946. The Harrises' gently tart comedy sketches made them the show's stars. By 1948, Fitch was replaced as sponsor by Rexall, the pharmaceutical company, and the show, now a strictly situation comedy with a music interlude each from husband and wife, was renamed The Phil Harris-Alice Faye Show.

Harris's comic talent was already familiar through his tenure on Jack Benny's radio shows for Jell-O and Lucky Strike. From 1936 to 1952, he played Benny's wisecracking, jive-talking, hipster bandleader. With their own show revamped to a sitcom, bandleader-comedian Harris and singer-actress Faye played themselves, raising two precocious children in slightly zany situations, mostly involving Harris's band guitarist Frank Remley (Elliott Lewis), obnoxious delivery boy Julius Abruzzio (Walter Tetley, familiar as nephew Leroy on The Great Gildersleeve), Robert North as Faye's fictitious deadbeat brother, Willie, and sponsor's representative Mr. Scott (Gale Gordon), and usually involving bumbling, malaproping Harris needing to be rescued by Faye.

The Harrises' two daughters were played on radio by Jeanine Roose and Anne Whitfield. Written mostly by Ray Singer and Dick Chevillat, the show stayed on NBC radio as a fixture until 1954.

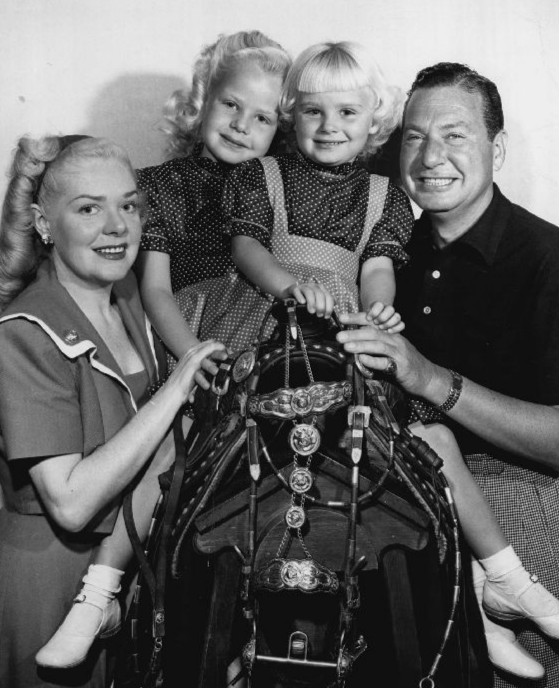
Alice Faye and Phil Harris with their daughters in 1948

Faye's singing ballads and swing numbers in her honeyed contralto voice was a regular highlight of the show, as was her knack for tart one-liners equal to those of her husband. The show's running gags also included references to Alice's wealth from her film career ("I'm only trying to protect the wife of the money I love" was a typical Harris drollery), and occasional barbs by Faye aimed at her rift with Zanuck, usually referencing Fallen Angel.

In its early years, the Harris-Faye radio show ranked among the top-10 radio programs in the country. The radio show also provided Faye with the perfect balance between show business and home life; since radio only required her to be present for a read-through and the live broadcast, Faye was still able to spend most of her time at home with her daughters.

== Later life and death ==
Faye supported Barry Goldwater in the 1964 United States presidential election.

Faye and Harris continued various projects, individually and together, for the rest of their lives. In 1974, Faye made a return to Broadway after 43 years in a revival of Good News, with her old Fox partner John Payne (who was replaced by Gene Nelson). In later years, Faye became a spokeswoman for Pfizer Pharmaceuticals, promoting the virtues of an active senior lifestyle. The Faye-Harris marriage endured 54 years until Harris's death in 1995. Faye admitted in an interview that when she married Harris, most of the Hollywood elite had predicted the marriage would only last about six months.

Three years after Phil Harris's death, Alice Faye died of stomach cancer in Rancho Mirage, California, four days after her 83rd birthday. She was cremated and her ashes rest beside those of Phil Harris at the mausoleum of the Forest Lawn Cemetery (Cathedral City) near Palm Springs, California. She has a star on the Hollywood Walk of Fame in recognition of her contribution to Motion Pictures at 6922 Hollywood Boulevard. In 1994, a Golden Palm Star on the Palm Springs, California, Walk of Stars was dedicated to her. The Phil Harris-Alice Faye Show remains a favorite of old-time radio collectors.

== Popularity and legacy ==
Her voice, The New York Times wrote in her obituary, was "inviting". Irving Berlin was once quoted as saying that he would choose Faye over any other singer to introduce his songs, and George Gershwin and Cole Porter called her the "best female singer in Hollywood in 1937". During her years as a musical superstar (from the 1930s to the early 1940s), Alice Faye managed to introduce 23 songs to the Hit Parade. She was the first female crooner and equivalent to Bing Crosby.

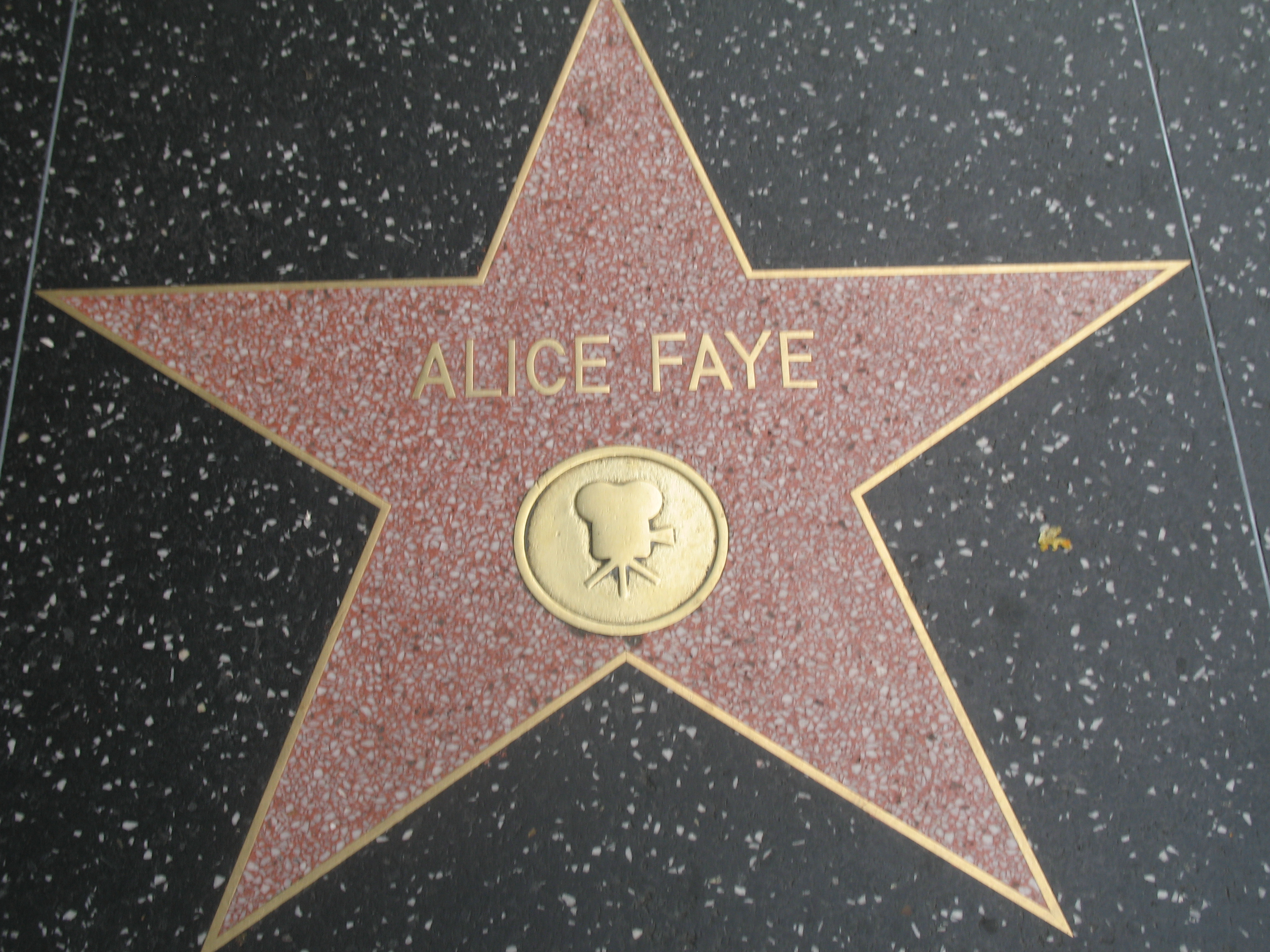
Alice Faye's star on the Hollywood Walk of Fame

Although Faye has had fans around the globe, she was never more popular than in Great Britain and in The Alice Faye Movie Book an article is devoted to Faye's popularity there. The author, Arthur Nicholson, mentions how enormously popular she was even in her Harlow days and though other films shown in England were usually shown for three days a week, Faye's films played for an entire week. After Faye retired in 1945, her reissued films made as much money (in some cases, more) as current releases. When Faye returned to the screen for State Fair in 1962, the film broke records in England.

== Filmography ==
=== Film ===
Year	Title	Role	Notes
1934	George White's Scandals	Kitty Donnelly / Mona Vale	Film debut
1934	Now I'll Tell	Peggy Warren	
1934	She Learned About Sailors	Jean Legoi	
1934	365 Nights in Hollywood	Alice Perkins	
1935	George White's 1935 Scandals	Honey Walters	
1935	Every Night at Eight	Dixie Foley	
1935	Music Is Magic	Peggy Harper	
1936	King of Burlesque	Pat Doran	
1936	Poor Little Rich Girl	Jerry Dolan	
1936	Sing, Baby, Sing	Joan Warren	Nominated – Academy Award for Best Original Song
1936	Stowaway	Susan Parker	
1937	On the Avenue	Mona Merrick	
1937	You Can't Have Everything	Judith Poe Wells	
1937	Wake Up and Live	Alice Huntley	
1937	You're a Sweetheart	Betty Bradley	
1938	In Old Chicago	Belle Fawcett	
1938	Sally, Irene and Mary	Sally Day	
1938	Alexander's Ragtime Band	Stella Kirby	Nominated – Academy Award for Best Original Song
1939	Tail Spin	Trixie Lee	
1939	Rose of Washington Square	Rose Sargent	
1939	Hollywood Cavalcade	Molly Adair Hayden	
1939	Barricade	Emmy Jordan	
1940	Little Old New York	Pat O'Day	
1940	Lillian Russell	Lillian Russell	
1940	Tin Pan Alley	Katie Blane	
1941	That Night in Rio	Baroness Cecilia Duarte	
1941	The Great American Broadcast	Vicki Adams	
1941	Week-End in Havana	Nan Spencer	
1943	Hello, Frisco, Hello	Trudy Evans	Academy Award for Best Original Song
1943	The Gang's All Here	Eadie Allen	
1944	Four Jills in a Jeep	Herself	Cameo
1945	Fallen Angel	June Mills	
1962	State Fair	Melissa Frake	
1976	Won Ton Ton, the Dog Who Saved Hollywood	Secretary at Gate	Cameo
1978	Every Girl Should Have One	Kathy	
1978	The Magic of Lassie	The Waitress (Alice)	Final film role
1995	Carmen Miranda: Bananas is My Business	Herself	Documentary

=== Radio appearances ===
Year	Program	Episode/source
1950	Lux Radio Theatre	Alexander's Ragtime Band
1951	Suspense	Death on My Hands
