= Alpha Video =

Entertainment company founded in 1985 as New Age Video, based near Philadelphia

- Type: Private
- Industry: Motion picture video production
- Founded: 1985; 41 years ago
- Headquarters: Wayne, Pennsylvania, United States
- Key people: Jerry Greene, President; Brian Krey, Director of Product Development, Acquisitions, & Content Management
- Products: DVDs
- Owner: The Greene family

Alpha Video (also known as Alpha Home Entertainment) is an entertainment company founded in 1985 as New Age Video, based near Philadelphia, that specializes in the manufacturing and marketing of public domain movies and TV shows on DVD. Since 2001, Alpha Video has released more than 5,100 titles and currently maintains a catalog of over 4,600 active titles.

With 600+ DVDs of TV shows in active distribution in 2009, industry publication DVD Release Report ranked Alpha Video #3 in their ranking of the "Top 20 Sources for TV Series on DVD Through the Period Ending December 31, 2009," behind Warner Home Video (733 releases) and Paramount Home Entertainment (666 releases). With over 1,461 theatrical releases available, the same publication ranked Alpha Video #2 in the "Top 20 Sources for Theatrical Catalog on DVD," just behind Warner Home Video (1,609 releases).

In November 2022, Alpha Video entered into an exclusive manufacturing and distribution agreement with Allied Vaughn and transitioned to a manufacture on demand (MOD) model.

The company is privately held, and owned by Collectables Records founder Jerry Greene. Alpha Video is one of a group of companies, including Collectables Records and Gotham Distributing Corporation, owned and operated by Jerry Greene and the Greene family. Until March 2023, this group also included the e-commerce website Oldies.com; however, that business is now part of Old School Ventures, Inc., a joint venture formed by MVD Entertainment Group and Gotham Distributing Corporation.

== Alpha New Cinema ==
Alpha New Cinema is a home video imprint launched in 2004 by Alpha Video, aiming to "present eclectic, interesting and unusual contemporary motion pictures and television productions." While Alpha Video has long been known for public domain reissues, Alpha New Cinema marked a deliberate shift into distributing new independent films, cult productions, and genre curiosities—especially horror, sci-fi, and outsider cinema.

Notable early releases included Fabulous! An Intimate Portrait of a Rock Pioneer, a documentary on rockabilly artist Charlie Gracie; Mark Redfield's atmospheric indie feature The Death of Poe; and Terror in the Tropics, a post-modern mash-up featuring archival footage of classic horror actors like Bela Lugosi, Boris Karloff, and Lon Chaney Jr. alongside new material. The imprint also became a home for the later work of Conrad Brooks, a regular collaborator of cult filmmaker Edward D. Wood Jr.

Over time, Alpha New Cinema developed into a haven for regional and underground filmmakers. Directors like Brett Piper, Henrique Couto, Joshua Kennedy, Mark Polonia, Dustin Ferguson, and Ted V. Mikels contributed original titles or sequels to their signature cult films. Releases range from creature features like Triclops and Cowgirls vs. Pterodactyls to oddball double features such as Sexpots From Space and Indie Horror Double Feature: R.I.P. Van Winkle Part 3 / Ogopogo: The Mythical Snake from the Lake. Alpha New Cinema also issued limited collector's sets, including autographed editions like the Ted V. Mikels Signature Collection.

Several recurring series further defined the imprint’s character. The most prolific is Mr. Lobo's Cinema Insomnia, a horror host series presented by cult personality Mr. Lobo, which recontextualizes classic and obscure films such as The Little Shop of Horrors, A Bucket of Blood, and Carnival of Souls with comedic commentary and retro-styled interstitial segments. In 2019, Alpha New Cinema began releasing restored episodes of the show on DVD, beginning with three themed specials: Mr. Lobo's Cinema Insomnia: Haunted House Special, Bob Wilkins Halloween Special, and Eegah!. These editions were praised for their nostalgic design and supplemental content, including music videos, interviews with genre personalities, and exclusive autographed postcards for direct orders.

As of 2025, Alpha New Cinema continues to operate as a niche label for contemporary cult cinema, low-budget horror, and experimental independent film—offering a platform for filmmakers working well outside the mainstream.

== Notable releases ==
=== Paula Abdul and Randy Jackson Present Ultimate Voice Coach ===
In 2005, Alpha Video released Paula Abdul and Randy Jackson Present Ultimate Voice Coach, a 3-disc instructional set featuring vocal training exercises led by celebrity voice coaches Gary Catona and Ron Anderson. Marketed during the height of American Idol’s popularity, the release included both DVD and audio CD components aimed at aspiring singers seeking foundational techniques in breath control and vocal range. The title is now out of print and no longer available.

=== The Merv Griffin Show: 40 of The Most Interesting People of Our Time ===
In 2006, Alpha Video partnered with Merv Griffin to release a 3-DVD box set of interviews from The Merv Griffin Show entitled The Merv Griffin Show: 40 of The Most Interesting People of Our Time. The set featured themed discs showcasing Griffin’s most iconic guests: the first focusing on “Hollywood Legends” such as Orson Welles, Ingrid Bergman, Richard Burton, Sophia Loren, Roy Rogers, Grace Kelly, and John Wayne; the second highlighting comedians including Jack Benny, Don Rickles, Jerry Seinfeld, Carl Reiner, Richard Pryor, George Burns, Jay Leno, and George Carlin; and the third presenting “Extraordinary Guests” like Walter Cronkite, Robert F. Kennedy, Richard Nixon, Gerald R. Ford, Ronald Reagan, and Martin Luther King Jr. Noted for its historical significance and wide-ranging cultural snapshots, the release was praised for capturing Griffin’s “astonishing guest list and sharp interviewing chops.” The title is now out of print and no longer available.

=== Release of Ted V. Mikels' film catalog on DVD ===
In 2007, Alpha Video released the catalog of cult filmmaker Ted V. Mikels, many titles of which had previously been available from Image Entertainment, under its Alpha New Cinema imprint. Titles released include 10 Violent Women, The Doll Squad, The Corpse Grinders, The Corpse Grinders II, Girl in Gold Boots, and Blood Orgy of the She Devils. Later that year, Alpha issued the Ted V. Mikels Signature Collection, a six-DVD box set limited to 1,000 hand-numbered copies and autographed by Mikels himself. The set compiled all six previously released titles and was marketed toward collectors of cult cinema. The Doll Squad was also released individually, with genre review site Mondo Digital noting it as part of Alpha's growing presence in cult film reissues. In 2008, the company released Mark of the Astro-Zombies, the official sequel to Mikels' 1968 cult classic The Astro-Zombies, on DVD.

=== Feature films ===
- Angel and the Badman
- Back Door to Heaven
- Below the Deadline
- The Blood of Jesus (packaged with the film Lying Lips)
- Borderline
- Bowery Blitzkrieg
- Boy! What a Girl!
- Boys of the City
- The Chase
- Cinderella
- Clancy Street Boys
- Cold Harbor
- Condemned to Live
- La Cucaracha
- Curley (packaged with the film Who Killed Doc Robbin)
- The Dark Hour
- Devil's Partner
- Dixiana
- East Side Kids
- Flesh and the Spur
- The Flying Deuces
- Flying Wild
- Ghost Patrol
- Ghosts on the Loose
- The Girl From Chicago
- The Great Flamarion
- Half Shot at Sunrise
- The Headless Horserman (packaged with the film The Mechanical Man)
- Hercules Unchained
- High Voltage
- Hook, Line, and Sinker
- The Kennel Murder Case
- Kid Dynamite
- Last Woman on Earth
- Let's Get Tough!
- Lisa and the Devil
- Lying Lips (packaged with the film The Blood of Jesus)
- Manos: The Hands of Fate
- The Mechanical Man (packaged with the film The Headless Horserman)
- Mickey the Great
- Million Dollar Kid
- Mr. Wise Guy
- 'Neath Brooklyn Bridge
- One Body Too Many
- Pride of the Bowery
- Raiders of Old California
- The Red-Haired Alibi
- The Ring
- Ring of Terror
- Salt of the Earth
- Scarlet Street
- Second Chance
- The Singing Cowgirl
- Smart Alecks
- Smash-Up, the Story of a Woman
- Something to Sing About
- Speak Easily
- Spooks Run Wild
- The Student of Prague (1913)
- The Student of Prague (1926)
- Sweeney Todd: The Demon Barber of Fleet Street (1936)
- The Terror of Tiny Town
- That Gang of Mine
- Time Table
- Tulsa
- Utopia
- Voyage to the Prehistoric Planet
- Voyage to the Planet of Prehistoric Women
- A Walk in the Sun
- Who Killed Doc Robbin (packaged with the film Curley)
- Woman on the Run
- Yellowneck

=== Exploitation films ===
- Assassin of Youth
- Chained for Life
- Child Bride
- The Cocaine Fiends
- Marihuana
- Reefer Madness
- Sex Madness

=== Movie serials ===
- Ace Drummond
- The Devil Horse
- The Fighting Marines
- Fighting with Kit Carson
- Flash Gordon Conquers the Universe
- Holt of the Secret Service
- Junior G-Men
- Junior G-Men of the Air
- King of the Wild
- The Phantom Empire
- Radar Men from the Moon
- Sea Raiders
- Sky Raiders
- Undersea Kingdom
- Zorro's Fighting Legion

== Short subjects ==
- Along Came Auntie (released as part of Stan Laurel and Oliver Hardy: Early Silent Classics collection)
- Bear Shooters (released as part of The Kids of Old Hollywood collection)
- Brideless Groom (released as part of The Three Stooges collection)
- Bromo and Juliet (released as part of Stan Laurel and Oliver Hardy: Early Silent Classics collection)
- Crazy Like a Fox (released as part of Stan Laurel and Oliver Hardy: Early Silent Classics collection)
- Disorder in the Court (released as part of The Three Stooges collection)
- Enough to Do (released as part of Stan Laurel and Oliver Hardy: Early Silent Classics collection)
- The Gay Nighties (released as part of the Lost Comedy Classics collection)
- Glad Rags to Riches (released as part of The Kids of Old Hollywood collection)
- The Hobo (released as part of Stan Laurel and Oliver Hardy: Early Silent Classics collection)
- Hop to It, Bellhop! (released as part of Stan Laurel and Oliver Hardy: Early Silent Classics collection)
- Kickin' the Crown Around (released as part of the Lost Comedy Classics collection)
- Kid in Hollywood (released as part of The Kids of Old Hollywood collection)
- Kid N' Africa (released as part of The Kids of Old Hollywood collection)
- Kid Speed (released as part of Stan Laurel and Oliver Hardy: Early Silent Classics collection)
- The Lucky Dog (released as part of Stan Laurel and Oliver Hardy: Early Silent Classics collection)
- Malice in the Palace (released as part of The Three Stooges collection)
- Merrily Yours (released as part of The Kids of Old Hollywood collection)
- Mickey's 11 (released as part of Mickey McGuire collection)
- Mickey's Medicine Man (released as part of Mickey McGuire collection)
- Mickey's Rescue (released as part of Mickey McGuire collection)
- Mickey's Touchdown (released as part of Mickey McGuire collection)
- Mud and Sand (released as part of Stan Laurel and Oliver Hardy: Early Silent Classics collection)
- Oranges and Lemons (released as part of Stan Laurel and Oliver Hardy: Early Silent Classics collection)
- Pardon My Pups (released as part of The Kids of Old Hollywood collection)
- Polly Trix in Washington (released as part of The Kids of Old Hollywood collection)
- The Sawmill (released as part of Stan Laurel and Oliver Hardy: Early Silent Classics collection)
- School's Out (released as part of The Kids of Old Hollywood collection)
- Short Kilts (released as part of Stan Laurel and Oliver Hardy: Early Silent Classics collection)
- Should Sailors Marry? (released as part of Stan Laurel and Oliver Hardy: Early Silent Classics collection)
- The Show (released as part of Stan Laurel and Oliver Hardy: Early Silent Classics collection)
- Sing a Song of Six Pants (released as part of The Three Stooges collection)
- Smithy (released as part of Stan Laurel and Oliver Hardy: Early Silent Classics collection)
- The Soilers (released as part of Stan Laurel and Oliver Hardy: Early Silent Classics collection)
- The Paper Hanger's Helper (released as part of Stan Laurel and Oliver Hardy: Early Silent Classics collection)
- The Stolen Jools (released as part of Stan Laurel and Oliver Hardy: Early Silent Classics collection)
- Thundering Fleas (released as part of Stan Laurel and Oliver Hardy: Early Silent Classics collection)
- The Tree in a Test Tube (released as part of Stan Laurel and Oliver Hardy: Early Silent Classics collection)
- Waldo's Last Stand (released as part of The Kids of Old Hollywood collection)
- War Babies (released as part of The Kids of Old Hollywood collection)
- West of Hot Dog (released as part of Stan Laurel and Oliver Hardy: Early Silent Classics collection)
- What's to Do? (released as part of The Kids of Old Hollywood collection)
- White Wings (released as part of Stan Laurel and Oliver Hardy: Early Silent Classics collection)
- Yes, Yes, Nanette (released as part of Stan Laurel and Oliver Hardy: Early Silent Classics collection)

=== Silent films ===
- The Bat
- The Birth of a Nation
- Broken Blossoms
- The General
- The Golem
- Intolerance
- The Lost World
- The Mechanical Man
- Nosferatu
- Oliver Twist
- Orphans of the Storm
- The Squaw Man
- The Thief of Baghdad
- Tumbleweeds

=== Television shows ===
- The Adventures of Champion
- The Adventures of Dr. Fu Manchu
- The Adventures of Jim Bowie
- The Adventures of Long John Silver
- The Adventures of Ozzie and Harriet
- The Adventures of Robin Hood
- The Adventures of Sir Lancelot
- Annie Oakley
- The Betty Hutton Show
- The Beverly Hillbillies
- Captain Video and His Video Rangers
- Climax!
- Colonel Bleep
- Cowboy G-Men
- Crossroads
- Diver Dan
- Dragnet
- Dusty's Trail
- The Ed Wynn Show
- Eerie, Indiana
- Frontier Doctor
- Fury
- I Married Joan
- The Lone Ranger
- The Lucy Show
- Mack and Myer for Hire
- Martin Kane, Private Eye
- Meet Corliss Archer
- Mr. and Mrs. North
- One Step Beyond
- Private Secretary (a.k.a. Susie)
- Rocky King, Inside Detective
- Sky King
- Stump The Stars
- Topper
- The Veil
- Wagon Train
- What's My Line?
- You Asked For It
- You Bet Your Life
