= Shirley Temple filmography =

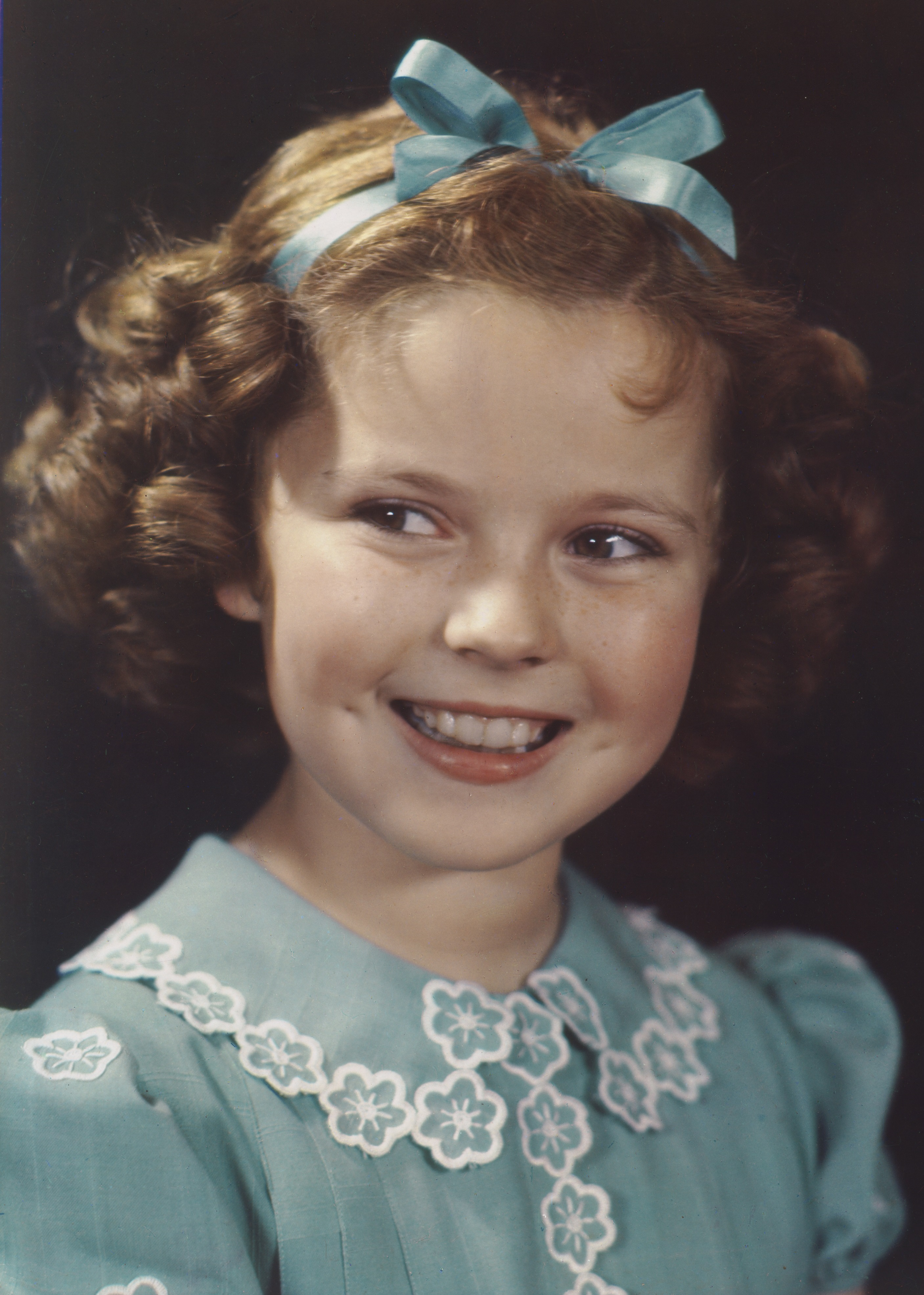
Shirley Temple in 1938

Shirley Temple (1928–2014) was an American child actress, dancer, and singer who began her film career in 1931, and continued successfully through 1949. When Educational Pictures director Charles Lamont scouted Meglan Dancing School for prospective talent, three-year-old student Temple hid behind the piano. Lamont spotted her and immediately decided she was the one he was looking for. Starting at $10 a day, she was eventually under contract for $50 per film. The production company generated its Baby Burlesks one-reeler film short satires of Hollywood films in 1931–1933, produced by Jack Hays and directed by Lamont. Temple made eight Baby Burlesks films, and 10 other short films, before being signed to star in feature-length motion pictures.

The role that launched her feature film career was a short song-and-dance sequence in the 1934 movie Stand Up and Cheer! for Fox Film, with James Dunn as her father. Her performance impressed studio executives so much that they immediately cast the duo in a follow-up film, Baby Take a Bow, with Temple again playing Dunn's daughter. Following the release of that film, Temple's parents negotiated two 7-year Fox contracts, one for Shirley as the performer, and the other for her mother as her guardian. Her parents had stipulations inserted to protect their daughter's privacy, while Fox retained control of all her public appearances. The bulk of the financial recompense went into revocable trusts. Later that same year, the film Bright Eyes was written as a starring vehicle for Temple, teaming her once again with Dunn. In this film, Temple sang the song most identified with her: "On the Good Ship Lollipop".

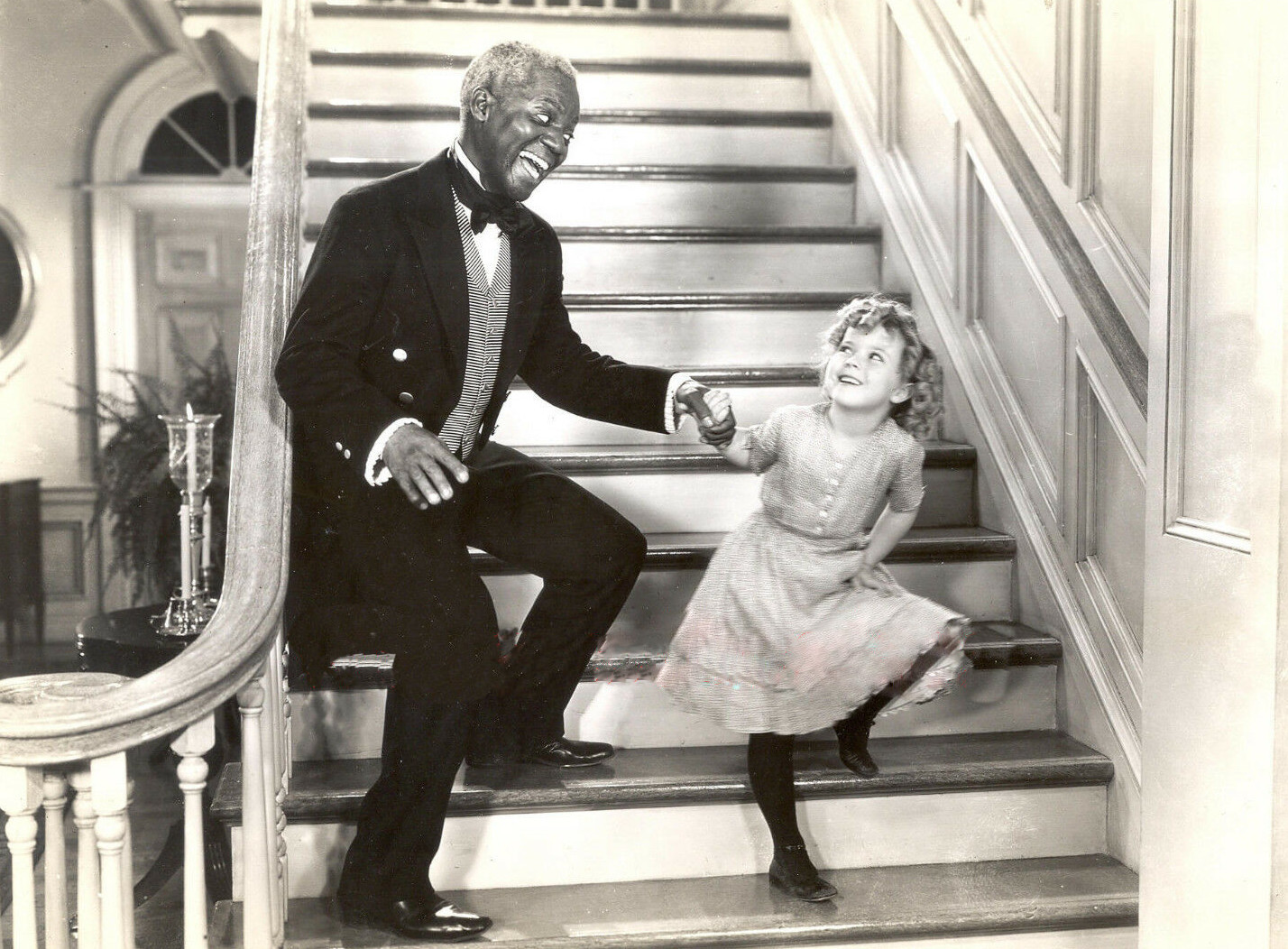
Temple and Robinson in the staircase tap dance from The Little Colonel (1935)

In addition to Dunn, Temple danced in her films with some of the most famous and accomplished entertainers of her era: Buddy Ebsen, Jack Haley, Alice Faye, George Murphy, Jimmy Durante, Charlotte Greenwood, and Jack Oakie. Bill "Bojangles" Robinson was her favorite partner. "It was kind of a magic between us", she later reminisced, and said he taught her how to execute her dance moves by syncing with the rhythm of the music, as opposed to watching her steps. In 1935's The Little Colonel, the first of their four films together, they made history as the first on screen interracial dancing partners.

Temple's films, made for between $400,000 and $700,000 each, earned millions of dollars in gross receipts in the United States and Canada. Her films ranked number-one at the box office in 1935, 1936, 1937, and 1938. The success of her films was also credited with saving her studio, 20th Century Fox, from bankruptcy during the Great Depression.

At the 7th Academy Awards in 1935, Temple was honored with the first Academy Juvenile Award. That same year, her hand prints and bare foot prints were immortalized in cement at Grauman's Chinese Theatre. At previous hand and foot print ceremonies, other celebrities traditionally left hand and shoe prints in the cement. The bare feet distraction was her idea to divert attention away from a gap in her smile left by a baby tooth that had fallen out. She received a star on the Hollywood Walk of Fame on February 8, 1960. Following the end of her film career, Temple had a two-season run of Shirley Temple's Storybook anthology on the NBC television network.

During the years 1974–1989, she served in the United States diplomatic corps under her married name of Shirley Temple Black.

== Film ==
=== Features ===
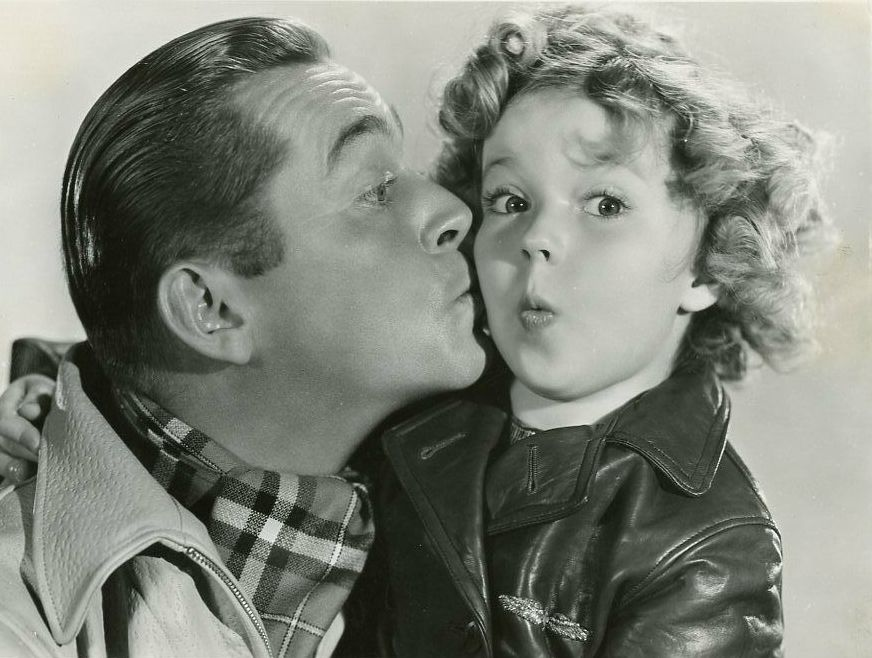
James Dunn and Temple in Bright Eyes (1934)

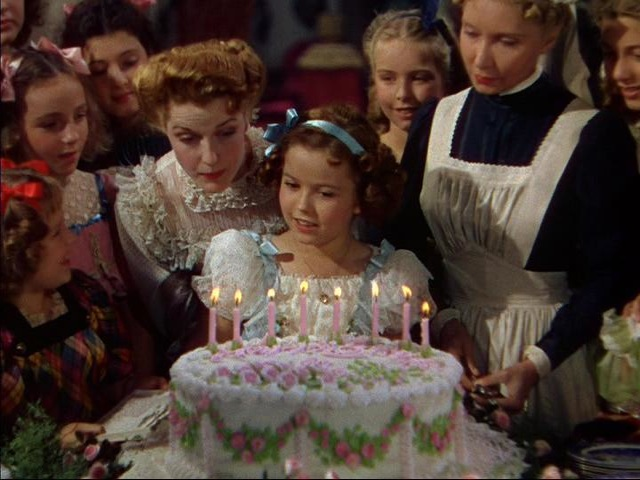
Temple in The Little Princess (1939)

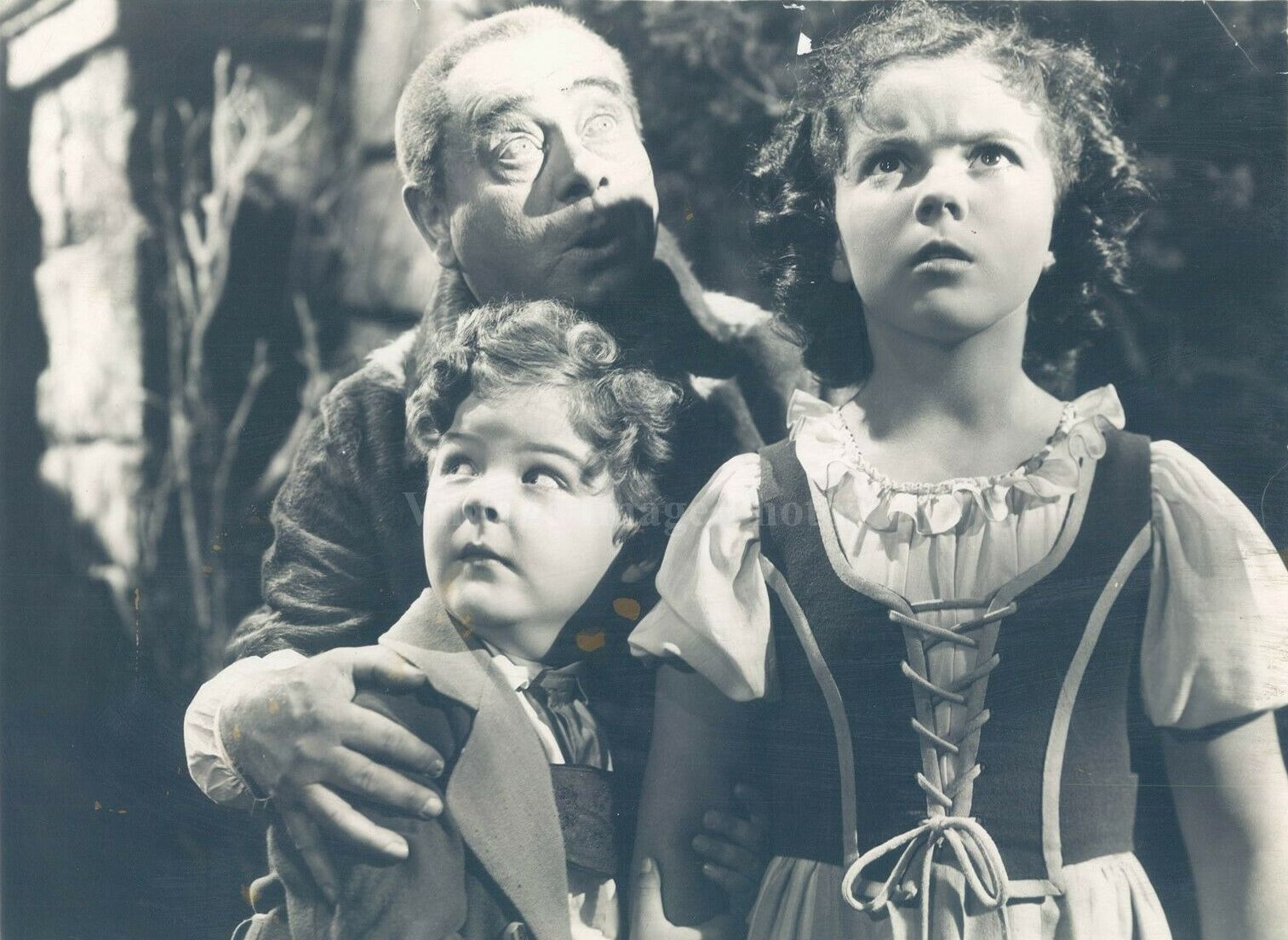
Johnny Russell, Eddie Collins, and Temple in The Blue Bird (1940)

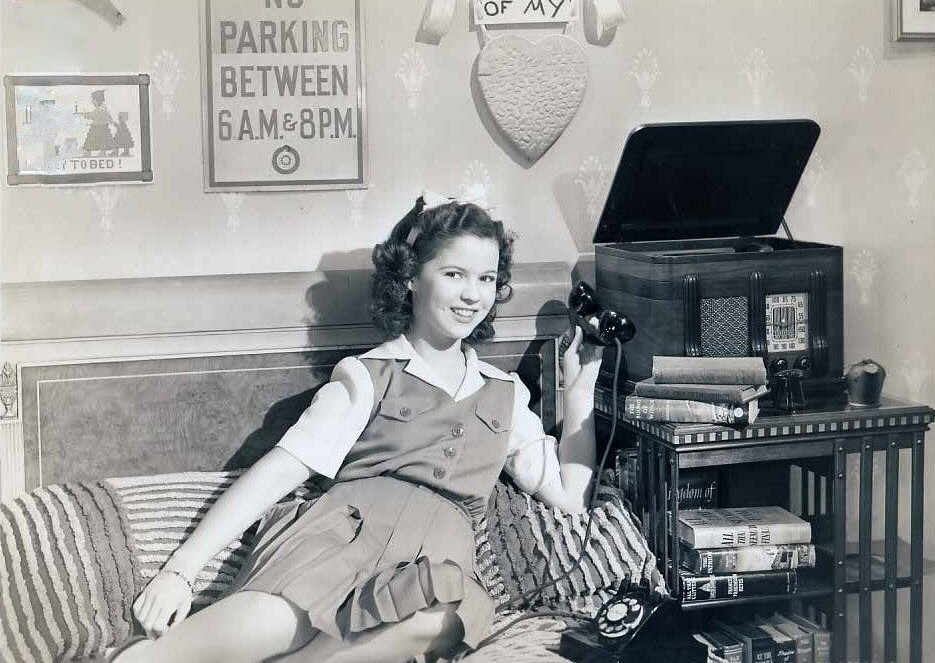
Temple in Miss Annie Rooney (1942)

Title	Year	Role	Notes	Ref(s)
The Red-Haired Alibi	1932	Gloria Shelton		
Out All Night	1933	Child	Credited as Shirley Jane Temple	
To the Last Man	1933	Mary Stanley	Uncredited	
Carolina	1934	Joan Connelly	Scenes cut	
As the Earth Turns	1934	Child	Uncredited	
Stand Up and Cheer!	1934	Shirley Dugan	Dance partner: James Dunn	
Baby Take a Bow	1934	Shirley Ellison	Dance partner: James Dunn	
Bright Eyes	1934	Shirley Blake	Dance partner: James Dunn	
Change of Heart	1934	Shirley (girl on airplane)	Uncredited	
Little Miss Marker	1934	Marthy "Marky" Jane		
Now I'll Tell	1934	Mary Doran	Preserved at the UCLA Film and Television Archive	
Now and Forever	1934	Penelope "Penny" Day		
George White's Scandals	1934	Daughter of Scandal Girl		
The Little Colonel	1935	Lloyd Sherman	Dance partner: Bill Robinson	
Our Little Girl	1935	Molly Middleton		
Curly Top	1935	Elizabeth Blair		
The Littlest Rebel	1935	Virginia "Virgie"' Cary	Dance partner: Bill Robinson	
Captain January	1936	Helen "Star" Mason	Dance partner: Buddy Ebsen	
Poor Little Rich Girl	1936	Barbara Barry	Dance partners: Jack Haley and Alice Faye	
Dimples	1936	Sylvia "Dimples" Dolores Appleby		
Stowaway	1936	Barbara "Ching-Ching" Stewart		
Wee Willie Winkie	1937	Priscilla "Winkie" Williams		
Heidi	1937	Heidi Kramer		
Ali Baba Goes to Town	1937	Herself	Uncredited cameo	
Rebecca of Sunnybrook Farm	1938	Rebecca Winstead	Dance partner: Bill Robinson	
Little Miss Broadway	1938	Betsy Brown Shea	Dance partners: George Murphy	
Just Around the Corner	1938	Penny Hale	Dance partner: Bill Robinson	
The Little Princess	1939	Sara Crewe		
Susannah of the Mounties	1939	Susannah "Sue" Sheldon		
The Blue Bird	1940	Mytyl		
Young People	1940	Wendy Ballantine	Dance partners: Charlotte Greenwood and Jack Oakie	
Kathleen	1941	Kathleen Davis		
Miss Annie Rooney	1942	Annie Rooney		
Since You Went Away	1944	Bridget "Brig" Hilton		
I'll Be Seeing You	1944	Barbara Marshall		
Kiss and Tell	1945	Corliss Archer		
Honeymoon	1947	Barbara Olmstead		
The Bachelor and the Bobby-Soxer	1947	Susan	Released in the UK as Bachelor Knight	
That Hagen Girl	1947	Mary Hagen		
Fort Apache	1948	Philadelphia Thursday		
Mr. Belvedere Goes to College	1949	Ellen Baker		
Adventure in Baltimore	1949	Dinah Sheldon		
The Story of Seabiscuit	1949	Margaret O'Hara Knowles		
A Kiss for Corliss	1949	Corliss Archer		

=== Baby Burlesks ===
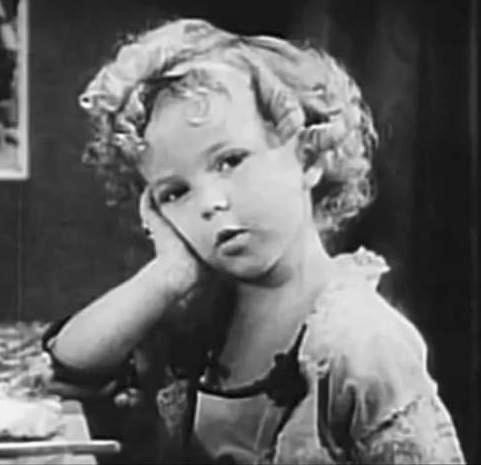
Shirley Temple in Glad Rags to Riches (1932)

Baby Burlesks credits of Shirley Temple
Title	Year	Role	Notes	Ref(s)
Runt Page	1931/1932	Lulu Parsnips	uncredited	
War Babies	1932	Charmaine		
The Pie-Covered Wagon	1932	Shirley		
Glad Rags to Riches	1932	Nell/La Belle Diaperina		
Kid in Hollywood	1932	Morelegs Sweettrick		
The Kid's Last Fight	1932	Shirley		
Kid 'in' Africa	1932	Madame Cradlebait		
Polly Tix in Washington	1933	Polly Tix		

=== Other short films ===
Other short film credits of Shirley Temple
Title	Year	Role	Notes	Ref(s)
Dora's Dunking Doughnuts	1933	Shirley	Educational Pictures, Inc.	
Merrily Yours	1933	Mary Lou Rogers		
What's to Do?	1933	Mary Lou Rogers		
Pardon My Pups	1934	Mary Lou Rogers		
Managed Money	1934	Mary Lou Rogers		
Mandalay	1934			
The Hollywood Gad-About	1934	Herself	Educational Films, Inc.	
Our Girl Shirley	1942	Herself	Re-issue combined Managed Money and Pardon My Pups	
American Creed	1946	Herself		

== Television ==
Year	Title	Role	Notes	Ref(s)
1958-1961	Shirley Temple's Storybook	Herself (host)/various		
1963	The Red Skelton Show	Bobo Barclay - Debutante	Guest performer; season 13, episode "Passion in Pasadena or Love Is a Many-Splintered Thing"	
1999	AFI's 100 Years...100 Stars	Herself (host)		

== Bibliography ==
- Temple Black, Shirley (1988). Child star. McGraw-Hill. ISBN 978-0-07-005532-2.
- Edwards, Anne (2017). Shirley Temple: American Princess. Rowman & Littlefield. ISBN 978-1-4930-2692-0.
- Pitts, Michael R. (2019). Astor Pictures: A Filmography and History of the Reissue King, 1933–1965. McFarland. ISBN 978-1-4766-7649-4.
- Windeler, Robert (1978). The Films of Shirley Temple. Secaucus, N.J. : Citadel Press. ISBN 978-0-8065-0615-9.
