= The Man I Married =

- Directed by: Irving Pichel
- Written by: Oscar Schisgall (short story); Oliver H. P. Garrett
- Produced by: Darryl F. Zanuck
- Starring: Joan Bennett; Francis Lederer; Lloyd Nolan; Anna Sten; Otto Kruger; Maria Ouspenskaya; Ludwig Stossel; Johnny Russell
- Distributed by: 20th Century Fox
- Release date: August 9, 1940
- Running time: 77 minutes
- Country: United States
- Language: English

The Man I Married (alternative title I Married a Nazi) is an American 1940 drama film starring Joan Bennett, Francis Lederer, Lloyd Nolan and Anna Sten.

== Plot ==
A successful, yet naive American woman, art critic Carol Cabbott, is married to German Eric Hoffman. They have a seven-year-old son, Ricky. They travel to pre-World War II Nazi Germany during the occupation of Austria and invasion of Czechoslovakia, to visit Eric's father, whom he has not seen for ten years, although everybody tells them that going to Nazi Germany is foolish. A friend, Dr. Hugo Gerhardt, asks them to deliver money to, and somehow help his brother, the famous philosopher Ernst Gerhardt, who has been arrested and imprisoned in the concentration camp Dachau.

When the Hoffmans reach Berlin, they are met at the station not by Eric's father but by Frieda, the former wife of Eric's old schoolmate and best friend. Eric's father, an elderly director and owner of a factory, tells them he wants to sell everything and leave Berlin, as he can no longer stand the hostile atmosphere. Even his butler is a Nazi, and Frieda is always around Eric as the plot progresses. An active and enthusiastic Nazi, Frieda invites Eric to Nazi Party gatherings until he no longer wants to return to America, but wants to keep the factory and remain in Nazi Germany. His wife, Carol, however, feels uneasy about staying there, and as time passes she recognizes her husband less and less.

While Eric attends Nazi gatherings, Carol tries to find out about Gerhardt, with the help of Kenneth Delane, an American foreign correspondent in Berlin who has a prophetic understanding of the demise of Nazi Germany. They find out Gerhardt has been killed in Dachau, so Carol gives the money to Gerhardt's widow. They witness scenes of deliberate cruel denigration of people by Nazis in the streets, and Carol begins to awaken to the true situation of Germany under Nazi control.

Carol suspects Eric of infidelity with Frieda, and Eric admits to Carol that he wants to marry Frieda. Carol reluctantly agrees, but they quarrel over custody of their son. Eric refuses to allow Carol to leave Germany with his son, whom he wishes to raise in the Nazi Party. Finally, Eric's father warns Eric that if he does not let Ricky return with Carol to the United States, he will go to the police and tell them that Eric's mother was a Jewess. Eric is devastated to learn of his heritage, and Frieda, who witnessed the interaction, is disgusted by this revelation of Eric's parentage and leaves the house exclaiming that he is a "Jude" (German for "Jew"). Carol and Ricky leave for New York. Delane, who had hoped to get a leave to go back home, takes them to the station and tells Carol he has to stay "for the duration."

== Cast ==
- Joan Bennett as Carol Hoffman
- Francis Lederer as Eric Hoffman
- Lloyd Nolan as Kenneth Delane
- Anna Sten as Frieda
- Otto Kruger as Heinrich Hoffman
- Maria Ouspenskaya as Frau Gerhardt
- Ludwig Stossel as Dr. Hugo Gerhardt
- Johnny Russell as Ricky
- Lionel Royce as Herr Deckhart
- Fredrik Vogeding as Traveler
- Ernst Deutsch as Otto
- Egon Brecher asa Czech
- William Kaufman as Conductor
- Frank Reicher as Friehof

== Reception ==
While the film received mostly positive reviews, Bennett's performance was an exception and received differing reviews. In 1940, New York Times reviewer Bosley Crowther called the "anti-Nazi propaganda film" "restrained", "frank and factual" and "generally entertaining cinematically". He singled out Lederer's performance for praise, but of Bennett he wrote, "she does little more than model dresses and express incredulity." A Variety review praised the film as a "powerful dramatic presentation" and Bennett's acting as "excellent as the educated American wife who sees through the schemes of Nazism, and provides much strength to a difficult assignment".
