= The Man Who Dared (1939 film) =

1939 film by Crane Wilbur

- Directed by: Crane Wilbur
- Screenplay by: Lee Katz
- Story by: Lucien Hubbard
- Produced by: Bryan Foy (uncredited)
- Cinematography: Arthur L. Todd
- Edited by: Harold McLernon
- Music by: Howard Jackson
- Production company: First National Pictures
- Distributed by: Warner Bros. Pictures, Inc.
- Release date: June 3, 1939
- Running time: 60 minutes
- Country: United States
- Language: English

The Man Who Dared (also known as City in Terror) is a 1939 American crime film directed by Crane Wilbur and written by Lee Katz. The film stars Jane Bryan, Charles Grapewin, Henry O'Neill, John Russell and Elizabeth Risdon. It was released by Warner Bros. Pictures on June 3, 1939.

== Plot ==
In the late 1930s, whistleblower Stuart McCrary, and his wife Mary are killed by Nick Bartel and other henchmen of the town's corrupt mayor to prevent McCrary's upcoming grand jury testimony. The neighboring Carter family witnesses the murders. After the mayor uses intimidation, assault and the kidnapping of the Carters' young son Bill to prevent them from testifying against Bartel, only the boy's grandfather Ulysses Porterfield has the courage to testify. The family is placed under police protection before their grand jury appearance. However, Porterfield escapes, rescues Bill, and appears in court as the only cooperating witness, which presumably leads to criminal indictments against Bartel, the mayor and his corrupt organization.

== Cast ==
- Jane Bryan as Marge Carter
- Charles Grapewin as Ulysses Porterfield
- Henry O'Neill as Matthew Carter
- John Russell as Ted Carter
- Elizabeth Risdon as Jessie Carter
- Jimmy McCallion as Ralph Carter
- Dickie Jones as Bill Carter
- Fred Tozere as Stephen Palmer
- John Gallaudet as Nick Bartel
- Grace Stafford as Mary McCrary

== Reception ==
The Man Who Dared was screened most commonly as the lesser half of a double feature in American theaters, although it received a nationwide release.

The Daily Times-Advocate of Escondido, California wrote that the film "is told in exciting fashion" and concluded: "The remarkable quality of the film lies in the fact that attention is focused not on the gangster activities but on how the family throws off the yoke of the underworld."
