= Miss Annie Rooney =

1942 film by Edwin L. Marin

- Theatrical release poster
- Directed by: Edwin L. Marin
- Written by: George Bruce
- Produced by: Edward Small
- Starring: Shirley Temple; Dickie Moore; William Gargan; Guy Kibbee
- Cinematography: Lester White
- Edited by: Fred R. Feitshans Jr. Grant Whytock
- Music by: Darrell Calker (uncredited); Michel Michelet (uncredited); Clarence Wheeler (uncredited)
- Production company: Edward Small Productions
- Distributed by: United Artists
- Release date: May 29, 1942
- Running time: 86 minutes
- Country: United States
- Language: English

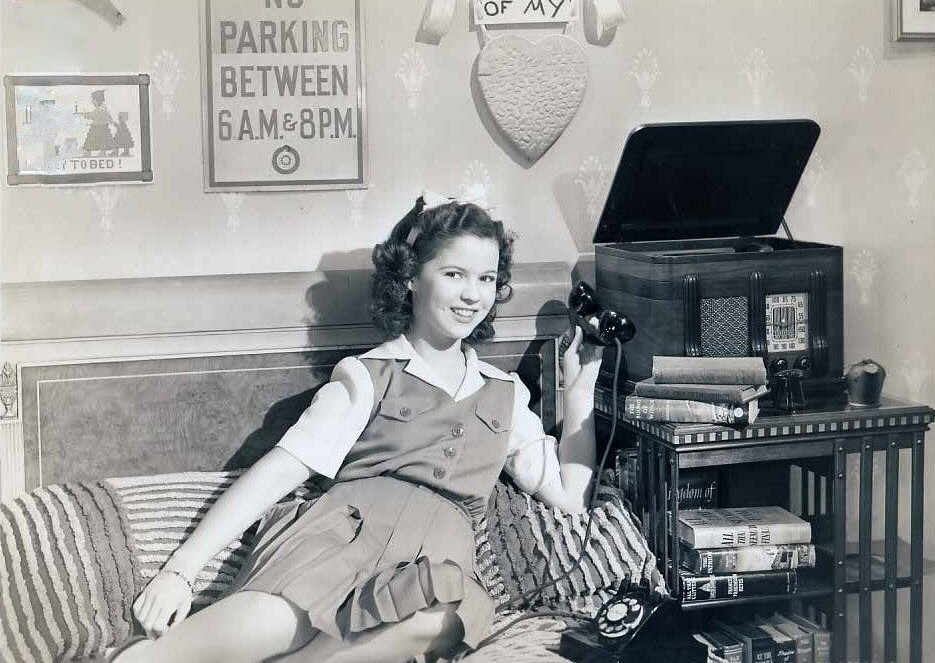
Shirley Temple in Miss Annie Rooney

Miss Annie Rooney is a 1942 American drama film directed by Edwin L. Marin and starring Shirley Temple and Dickie Moore. The screenplay by George Bruce has some similarities to the silent film Little Annie Rooney, starring Mary Pickford, but otherwise, the films are unrelated. Notable as the film in which Shirley Temple received her first on-screen kiss, and Moore said it was his first kiss ever. The film was panned.

== Plot ==
Annie Rooney (Temple), the 14-year-old daughter of a struggling salesman, falls in love with rich, 16-year-old Marty White (Moore). While at first, Marty's snobbish friends give Annie the cold shoulder, her jitterbug dancing skills impress, and soon, she is a welcome addition to their circle. Marty's wealthy mother and father, who own a rubber-making business, are not as easily persuaded of Annie's worth. But when her father manages to invent a new form of synthetic rubber, her triumph is complete.

== Cast ==
- Shirley Temple as Annie Rooney, a teenager
- William Gargan as Tim Rooney, her inventor father
- Guy Kibbee as Grandpop, her grandfather
- Dickie Moore as Marty White, a rich teenager
- Gloria Holden as Mrs. White, Marty's mother
- Jonathan Hale as Mr. White, Marty's father
- Peggy Ryan as Myrtle
- Charles Coleman as Sidney, the White's butler
- Roland Dupree as Joey
- Mary Field as Mrs Metz
- George Lloyd as Burns
- Jan Buckingham as Madam Sylvia
- Selmer Jackson as Mr Thomas
- June Lockhart as Stella Bainbridge (last surviving cast member)
- Edgar Dearing as Policeman
- Shirley Mills as Audrey Hollis
- Byron Foulger as Mr. Randall (uncredited)

== Production ==
Temple signed to make one film for United Artists, and it was to be either Little Annie Rooney or Lucky Sixpence. It was eventually decided to film the former. The title was changed to Miss Annie Rooney to reflect Temple's maturity; she was paid $50,000 for her performance.

Temple was 14 when the film was made and received a much-ballyhooed on-screen kiss (from Moore, on the left cheek).

== Reception ==
The film was her second attempt at a comeback, but its teen culture theme was dated, and the film flopped. Temple retired again for another two years. Later, she told Moore the film was a "terrible picture".

Reviews were poor.

== Release ==
=== Critical reception ===
The New York Times thought, "'Miss Annie Rooney' is a very little picture. It is a very grim little picture [...] Gingerly, very gingerly, producer Edward Small is breaking the news to the public— baby Shirley doesn't live here anymore. Gone are the days of the toddling tot, the days of milk teeth and tonsils. Instead, we now see a Miss Temple in the awkward age between the paper-doll and sweater-girl period, an adolescent phenomenon who talks like a dictionary of jive, and combines this somehow with quotations from Shakespeare and Shaw."

=== Home media ===
In 2009, the film was available on videocassette. As of 2013, the film is available on Netflix Instant Streaming. In 2017, ClassicFlix restored the movie in releases on DVD and Blu-ray.

== See also ==
- Little Annie Rooney
- Shirley Temple filmography
