= The Blue Bird (1940 film) =

1940 film by Walter Lang

- Theatrical release poster
- Directed by: Walter Lang
- Screenplay by: Ernest Pascal; Walter Bullock (additional dialogue)
- Based on: the play by Maurice Maeterlinck
- Produced by: Gene Markey (associate producer)
- Starring: Shirley Temple; Spring Byington; Nigel Bruce; Gale Sondergaard; Eddie Collins; Sybil Jason; Jessie Ralph; Helen Ericson; Johnny Russell; Laura Hope Crews; Russell Hicks; Cecilia Loftus; Al Shean; Gene Reynolds
- Cinematography: Arthur Miller; Ray Rennahan
- Edited by: Robert Bischoff
- Music by: Alfred Newman
- Production company: Twentieth Century-Fox Film Corporation
- Distributed by: Twentieth Century-Fox
- Release date: January 15, 1940
- Running time: 88 minutes
- Country: United States
- Language: English
- Budget: $2 million

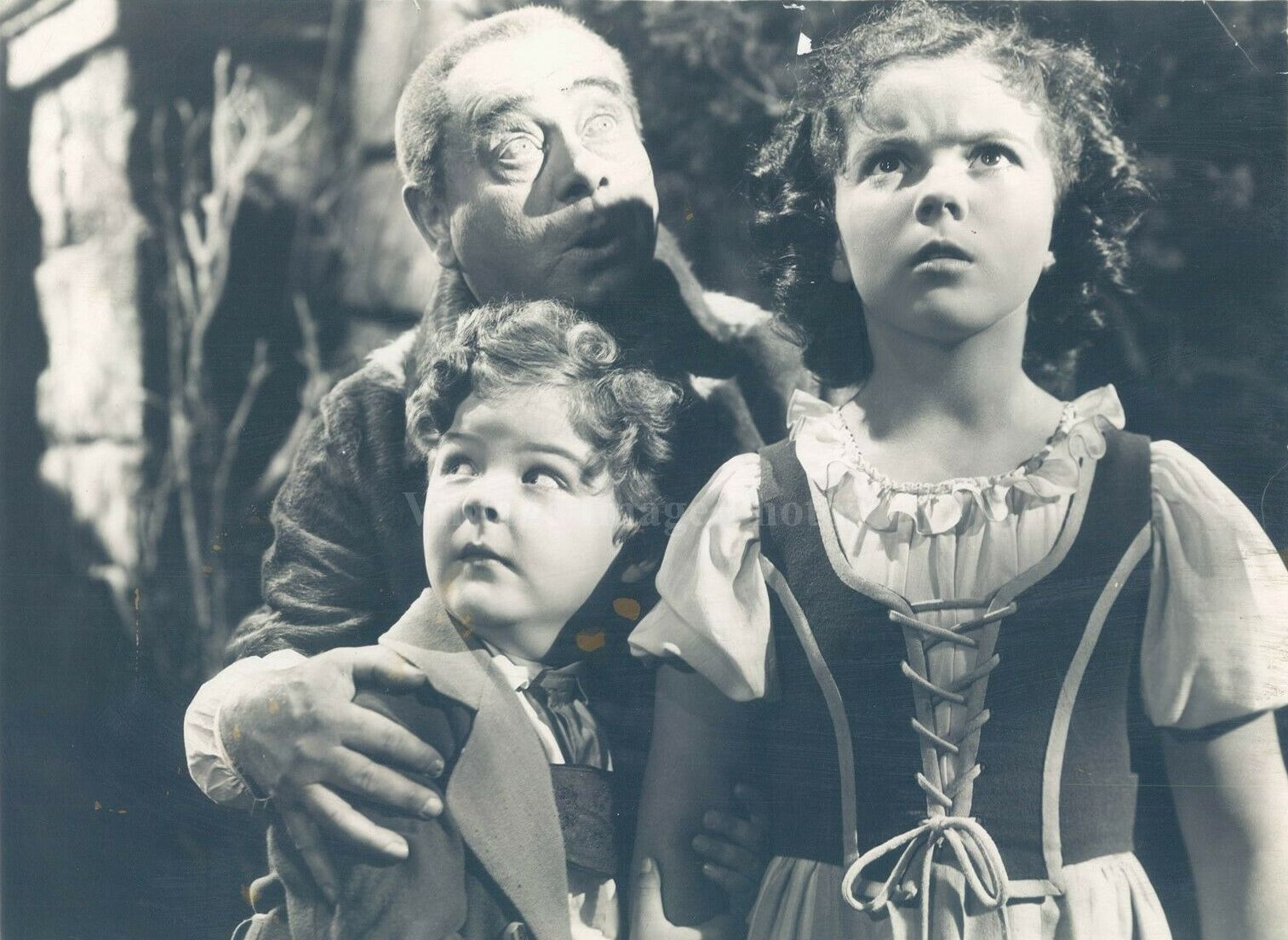
Johnny Russell (foreground), Eddie Collins, and Shirley Temple in a publicity photo for the film

The Blue Bird is a 1940 American fantasy film directed by Walter Lang. The screenplay by Walter Bullock was adapted from the 1908 play of the same name by Maurice Maeterlinck. Intended as 20th Century Fox's answer to MGM's The Wizard of Oz, which had been released the previous year, it was filmed in Technicolor and tells the story of a disagreeable young girl (played by Shirley Temple) and her search for happiness.

Despite being a box office flop and losing money, the film was nominated for two Academy Awards. It is available on both VHS and DVD.

== Plot ==
The setting is Germany during the Napoleonic Wars. Mytyl, an unhappy daughter of a wood cutter, finds a unique bird in the royal forest and selfishly refuses to give it to her sick friend Angela. Her mother and father are mortified at Mytyl's behavior. That evening, her father is called to report for military duty the next morning.

Mytyl is visited in a dream by a fairy named Berylune who sends her and her brother Tyltyl to search for the Blue Bird of Happiness. To accompany them, the fairy magically transforms their dog Tylo, cat Tylette, and lantern into human form. The children have many adventures: they visit the past (meeting their dead grandparents who come to life because they are being remembered), experience a life of luxury, escape a scary fire in the forest (caused by Tylette's lies to the trees in a treacherous attempt to make the children quit their journey), and see the future, a land of yet-to-be-born children.

Mytyl awakes as a kinder and gentler girl who has learned to appreciate her home and family. The following morning, her father receives word that a truce has been declared and he no longer must fight in the war. Mytyl is inspired to give the unique bird, now revealed to be the eponymous Blue Bird that she had sought throughout her journey, to Angela.

== Cast ==
- Shirley Temple as Mytyl
- Spring Byington as Mummy Tyl
- Nigel Bruce as Mr. Luxury
- Gale Sondergaard as Tylette
- Eddie Collins as Tylo
- Sybil Jason as Angela Berlingot
- Jessie Ralph as Fairy Berylune
- Helen Ericson as Light
- Johnny Russell as Tyltyl
- Laura Hope Crews as Mrs. Luxury
- Russell Hicks as Daddy Tyl
- Cecilia Loftus as Granny Tyl
- Al Shean as Grandpa Tyl
- Leona Roberts as Mrs. Berlingot
- Gene Reynolds as Studious Boy
- Stanley Andrews as Wilhelm
- Frank Dawson as Caller of Roll
- Sterling Holloway as Wild Plum
- Thurston Hall as Father Time
- Edwin Maxwell as Oak
- Herbert Evans
- Brandon Hurst as Footmen
- Keith Hitchcock as Major Domo
- Tommy Baker
- Dorothy Joyce as Lovers
- Billy Cook as Boy Chemist
- Scotty Beckett
- Juanita Quigley
- Payne Johnson as Children
- Ann Todd as Little Sister
- Diane Fisher as Little Girl

Four-year-old Caryll Ann Ekelund appears as an unborn child in the film. On Halloween 1939, Ekelund's costume caught fire from a lit jack-o-lantern. She died from her burns several days later and was buried in her costume from the film. Ekelund came from a showbusiness family; her older sister was actress Jana Lund.

The "Studious Boy" character played by Gene Reynolds is a yet-to-be-born Abraham Lincoln, indicated by Alfred Newman's theme from the previous year's Young Mr. Lincoln. The "Boy inventor" played by uncredited Buster Phelps is a later-to-be-born Thomas Edison.

== Production ==
Despite a lingering myth that Shirley Temple was originally cast as Dorothy Gale in The Wizard of Oz (1939) when 20th Century-Fox was to loan her to Metro-Goldwyn-Mayer in exchange for Clark Gable and Jean Harlow until the plan fell through following the latter's death in June 1937, she had been only briefly considered because she was a proven box-office draw and MGM did not acquire the rights to L.Frank Baum's first Oz book until seven months after Harlow died. Arthur Freed, an uncredited producer on The Wizard of Oz, wanted rising child star Judy Garland for the lead role. When producers listened to Temple's singing voice, they were unimpressed. Temple would not have been available in any event because Fox refused to loan her to other studios. Gale Sondergaard was initially cast as the Wicked Witch of the West. During pre-production, an early idea was to have the witch portrayed as a slinky, glamorous villainess in a black, sequined costume, inspired by the Evil Queen in Walt Disney's Snow White and the Seven Dwarfs (1937). Sondergaard was photographed for two wardrobe tests, both of which survive—one as a glamorous witch, and another as a conventionally ugly one. After the decision was made to have an ugly witch, Sondergaard, reluctant to wear the disfiguring makeup and fearing it could damage her career, withdrew from the role, and it went to veteran character actress Margaret Hamilton.

When The Wizard of Oz became a success and shot Judy Garland to fame, Fox moved to create their own fantasy feature starring Temple and Sondergaard, and based on the 1909 fantasy play The Blue Bird by Maurice Maeterlinck. Walt Disney had previously attempted to purchase the rights to the play to create an animated adaptation.

In imitation of The Wizard of Oz, the opening scenes are in black-and-white (though without a sepia tint), although the opening credits are in color. But unlike in The Wizard of Oz, when The Blue Bird changes to full color, it remains as such for the remainder of the film.

Producer Darryl F. Zanuck changed the Tyltyl character (played by Johnny Russell) to be much younger than Temple's Mytyl character, as he felt that a boy of closer age would have to be mentally incompetent to allow a girl to take leadership away from him. Zanuck also dropped some of the characters in the original story such as Bread, Water, Fire, Milk, Sugar and Night, as he wanted the story to focus more on Temple as the star. He also wanted to cast Bobs Watson as Tyltyl, Gene Lockhart as Daddy Tyl, Joan Davis as Tylette, Jessie Ralph as Mrs. Berlingot, Anita Louise as Light, Zeffie Tilbury as Granny, George Barbier as Grandpa, Andy Devine as Cold in Head and Berton Churchill as Time. According to the liner notes by Jon Burlingame featured on the booklet for the 2003 limited edition soundtrack release, Sonja Henie was also considered for the role of Light, Edna Mae Oliver was considered for the role of Fairy Berylune and Joe E. Brown was considered for the role of Tylo. During the writing of the screenplay, Temple's mother objected to her daughter's characterization as "too nice" and also raised concerns that the script did not focus enough on her. The tension came to a head when Zanuck threatened suspension, and after consulting with their lawyer, the Temples agreed to proceed with the film as planned.

It was shot on location in Lake Arrowhead, California with a $2 million budget, employing the Technicolor process.

Almost a month prior to its release, The Blue Bird was dramatized as a half-hour radio play on the December 24, 1939 broadcast of CBS Radio's The Screen Guild Theater, starring Temple and Nelson Eddy. During the performance, as Temple was singing "Someday You'll Find Your Bluebird," a woman arose from her seat and brandished a handgun, pointing it directly at Temple. She froze just long enough for police to stop her. It was later discovered that the woman's daughter had died on the day she mistakenly believed Temple was born, and blamed Temple for stealing her daughter's soul. The woman did not know that Temple was born in 1928, not 1929.

== Differences between film and play ==
The film, although following the basic plot of the play, greatly embellishes the story and does not contain the play's original dialogue. The opening black-and-white scenes and the war subplot were invented for the film. Mytyl's selfishness, the basic trait of her personality, is a plot thread specifically written into the motion picture that is not present in the original play, although Tyltyl, the older and more prominent child in the original, does somewhat share that characteristic.

The play begins with the children already asleep and the dream about to begin, and there is no depiction of the family's daily life as in the film.

== Music ==
Alfred Newman's original score to The Blue Bird was released in 2003 by Screen Archives Entertainment, Chelsea Rialto Studios, Film Score Monthly and Fox Music. The album contains the entire score as heard in the film in chronological order. It was produced using rare preservation copies of the original nitrate optical scoring sessions, which were digitally restored by Ray Faiola. The rare limited edition includes an illustrated 24-page color booklet with exclusive liner notes by film and music historians Jon Burlingame and Faiola, detailing the film's production and scoring.

All music is composed by Alfred Newman, except where noted.

The Blue Bird (Original Motion Picture Soundtrack)
No.	Title	Length
1.	"Main Title"	1:17
2.	"The Royal Forest"	3:19
3.	"Selfish Mytyl/Come O Children One and All/Returning Home with the Bird"	7:32
4.	"Awaking in Technicolor/Tylo and Tylette on Two Legs/Search for the Blue Bird"	10:04
5.	"In the Graveyard"	3:44
6.	"There Are No Dead People/Granny and Grandpa"	4:57
7.	"Lay-De-O" (Shirley Temple)	1:00
8.	"Leaving Granny and Grandpa"	1:29
9.	"The Land of Luxury"	4:44
10.	"Carousel in the Foyer"	0:40
11.	"Fighting Over the Horse"	1:13
12.	"Fed Up with the Land of Luxury"	5:35
13.	"Escape"	1:51
14.	"Return to "Light""	1:43
15.	"Tylette Summons the Trees/Forest Fire"	8:09
16.	"Boat to Safety/The Land of Unborn Children"	5:30
17.	"Father Time/The Children are Born"	8:01
18.	"Returning Home"	1:57
19.	"Waking Up/Finale"	5:15
20.	"End Cast"	0:58
Total length:		79:12

"The Land of Unborn Children" includes a few bars from Newman's theme for the previous year's Young Mr. Lincoln, as the Studious Boy played by Gene Reynolds is a yet-to-be-born Abraham Lincoln.

== Awards ==
The film was nominated in two categories at the 13th Academy Awards ceremony:

- Academy Award for Best Cinematography - (Arthur Miller, Ray Rennahan)
- Academy Award for Best Visual Effects - (Fred Sersen (photographic), Edmund H. Hansen [uncredited] (sound))

== Merchandise ==
=== Dolls ===
Shirley Temple Blue Bird dolls were first made in the 1940s to coincide with the film (Composition Shirleys had started in production in 1934). These dolls were dressed to look like Mytyl (Shirley's character). Many varieties were manufactured, including different sizings, costumes and face molds: Younger face (chubbier with less rosy cheeks) and older Shirley face (Slimmer head mold with make up by the eyes). Each doll is marked with "Shirley Temple" either on the head or the body (there are many variants to the marking, but they will always say “Shirley”) and comes in a cardboard box with a Shirley Temple doll button on the doll's outfit.

The variants are:

- 13-inch doll with light blue dress, white sleeves and white section on the front where a felt bluebird can be seen in the middle, wearing white shoes with a button strap and white socks (many turned off-white over time).
- 16-inch doll wearing dress with white top-half and bottom blue skirt section. The skirt section has a white pinafore over it, with one blue bird on the side of the bottom of the pinafore. On top is a red tie-up vest/bodice. Again with the white/off white oil cloth shoes and whitish socks; same styling as the 13-inch doll.
- 18-inch doll is much like the 16-inch, except that the birds are on both sides of the pinafore and there is no lace-up on the bodice, as well as a much lighter skirt section and much darker birds.
- 20-inch doll wears an outfit exactly like the 16-inch; she also wears a blue ribbon in her hair.

These are the most common variations. Since the dolls clothes were often made with extra fabric and by housewives (since the Ideal Toy Company couldn't keep up with the dolls' high demand, they employed women working out of their homes to help them finish with production)--they have many valid slight variations caused by this "non factory" setting. Most Shirley clothes will be marked with her name on the inside tag to verify its legitimacy.

The Danbury Mint made a Blue Bird outfit for their dress-up Shirley temple doll. It came with a dark blue jacket bodice, dress piece with white on the top, matched with a dark blue skirt with dark red and thin white stripes mixed in. Also included were moccasin-type brown shoes.

=== Shirley Temple Blue Bird Figurines ===
After the ending of the only official company licence to produce Shirley Temple toy merchandise by Ideal was dissolved, Danbury Mint soon took over and created many Shirley items, one being the Shirley Blue Bird resin figurine.

The November Figure — as part of a month line-up, there is a Shirley figure in a blue dress with a blue ribbon in her hair, smiling while holding a bluebird on her wrist close to her face, atop a stand marked November.

A figure from their Silver Screen Collection Depicts her standing in the grass and flowers holding the bluebird up high on one finger looking at it in awe.

=== Home media ===
The film was released on DVD in the US and Canada only in March 2007.

The film has also been released as part of three Shirley Temple DVD collections

- The Shirley Temple Collection: Volume Three
- Shirley Temple: America's Sweetheart Collection, Volume 5
- Shirley Temple: Little Darling Collection

Coming in both a cardboard cover and a plastic hard shell was the VHS Shirley movie set release of The Blue Bird. The front featuring an up-close shot of Shirley holding a bluebird on her finger looking to the left at it. On the side it is marked 17 and has a full body image of Shirley holding her bluebird in a small basket cage.

The Shirley Temple Blue bird ornaments produced by Danbury Mint. From 2012 it features a profile photo of Shirley from the movie and it has a star at the top saying Shirley Temple.

== See also ==
- List of American films of 1940
- Shirley Temple filmography
- The Blue Bird (1976), also released by 20th Century Fox

== Bibliography ==
- Temple Black, Shirley (1988). Child Star: An Autobiography. New York: McGraw Hill. ISBN 978-0-446-35792-0.
- Windeler, Robert (1992) [1978]. The Films of Shirley Temple. Carol Publishing Group. pp. 208–211. ISBN 0-8065-0725-X.
