= John R. Countryman =

American diplomat (1933–2024)

4th United States Ambassador to Oman
- In office October 14, 1981 – July 29, 1985
- President: Ronald Reagan
- Preceded by: Marshall W. Wiley
- Succeeded by: George Cranwell Montgomery

Personal details
- Born: John Russell Countryman; January 25, 1933 Brooklyn, New York, U.S.
- Died: December 14, 2024 (aged 91) Loudoun, Virginia, U.S.
- Spouse: Illona Zwolski Vachon (m. 1973)
- Children: 1
- Education: Fordham University; University of Miami
- Occupation: Actor; diplomat

John Russell Countryman (January 25, 1933 – December 14, 2024), also known by the stage names John Russell, Johnny Russell or Johnnie Russell, was an American child actor and career officer for the United States Foreign Service.

Before the age of ten, Countryman appeared in more than a dozen Hollywood films, and afterwards had a brief career on the New York stage. A graduate of a private Jesuit military secondary school, he served in the Air Force and then entered the Foreign Service in 1962. He held various postings in the Middle East and Africa before being appointed United States Ambassador to Oman from 1981 to 1985. Following his 35-year diplomatic career, he served as Executive Director of the Mission for Peace and Cooperation in the Middle East under the auspices of Search for Common Ground.

== Early life and family ==
John Russell Countryman was born in Brooklyn, New York, on January 25, 1933. His father, Russell Countryman, worked for Associated Press as a photography and art editor; his mother was a Czech immigrant. He was named for John Budd Long, general manager of the California Newspaper Publishers Association. He had one sister.

== Acting career ==
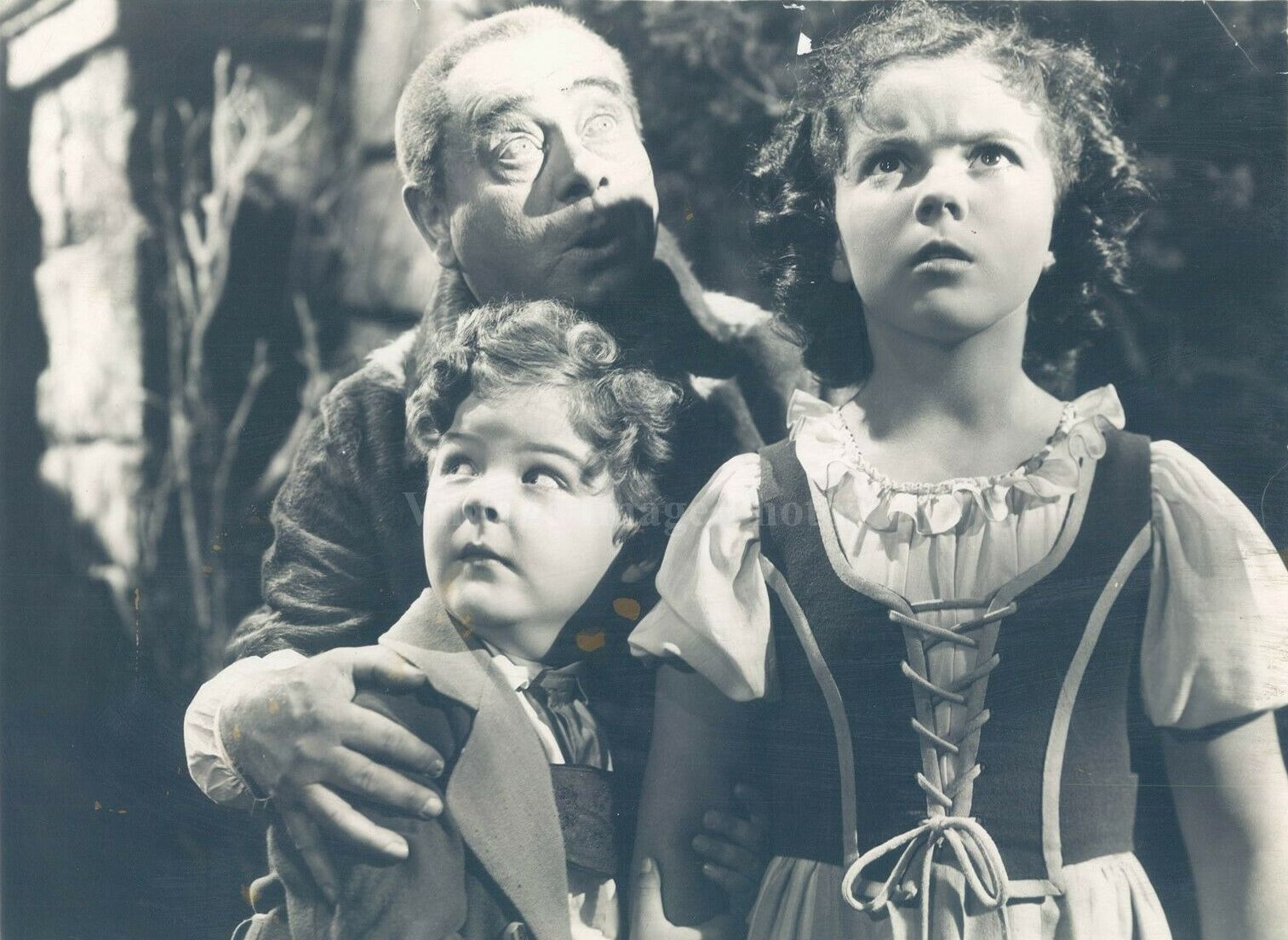
Russell (foreground), Eddie Collins, and Shirley Temple in a publicity photo for The Blue Bird

From age three to ten, John was a child model and actor. Using the stage name Johnnie Russell (alternately billed as Johnny Russell or John Russell), he was known for his "fair curls and pretty-pudgy face". Russell landed his first film role in the 1937 film The Duke Comes Back while vacationing in Los Angeles with his mother. Though his performance garnered praise, it did not seem to be leading to a film career until he screen-tested for the role of the son of Barbara Stanwyck's character in the 1938 film Always Goodbye. He was chosen over 489 other applicants between the ages of 4 1/2 and 7 and signed to a contract with Twentieth Century Fox. A succession of film roles quickly followed. (Note: In a personal interview, Countryman said he had made 18 films in Hollywood.)

One of his notable film roles was as Tyltyl, the younger brother of Shirley Temple's character Mytyl in The Blue Bird, released in 1940. This film marked the first time another child played alongside Temple for the duration of the story, and Temple's mother Gertrude was upset about the six-year-old Russell sharing screen time with her daughter. She tried to have Russell, who was "notably talented and cute", replaced, but producer Darryl F. Zanuck insisted on Russell being retained as Temple's character's brother. (Note: The two child actors crossed paths again decades later in Africa, where Countryman was Deputy Chief of Mission in Gabon and Temple was the United States Ambassador to Ghana.) Russell later acted on the New York stage.

== Education and military career ==
Seeking a "normal childhood" for their son, John's parents relocated the family to Garden City, New York, where John attended a local elementary school. He next studied at Xavier High School, a private Jesuit military secondary school in Manhattan, where he was a contemporary of Antonin Scalia and served as a major in the cadet regiment and won gold medals in the debating, oratory, and dramatics clubs. He graduated from high school in 1950 and earned his bachelor's degree in English literature from Fordham University in 1954.

While in college, Countryman had signed up with the Reserve Officers' Training Corps (ROTC), but his military service was deferred when he was awarded a post-graduate Fulbright Fellowship to study English literature at the Free University of Berlin. He had applied for a fellowship to the University of Leeds, but the Fulbright Program had a surplus of applications for England and not that many for Germany. Countryman had studied German in both high school and university, and agreed to switch countries.

In 1955, he joined the United States Air Force, serving in the Strategic Air Command for three years. He mainly flew tanker aircraft such as the KC-97 and KB-29, but also flew the B-47 and B-52. He served primarily in the mainland United States, although he did provide limited support for personnel and equipment transfers between Alaska and Japan. His overseas experience sparked his desire to join the United States Foreign Service, and while studying for his master's degree at the University of Miami, he also studied for the Foreign Service exam. He successfully passed the written and oral exams in 1961, the same year he received his master's degree in English and American literature with his thesis on "The German Element in the Writings of Thomas Wolfe". While waiting to enter the Foreign Service, he worked as a city reporter for The News-Times in Danbury, Connecticut. He joined the Foreign Service in February 1962.

== Foreign Service career ==
At nearly 30 years old, Countryman was one of the oldest in his incoming class, as most entrants had just graduated from college. He scored high in his German language test and was recommended to study a "hard" language like Turkish for a Near East posting. He briefly worked in the Bureau of Near Eastern Affairs, which covered Turkey at the time, and then began his Turkish language course. He reported to the diplomatic mission in Istanbul in January 1963.

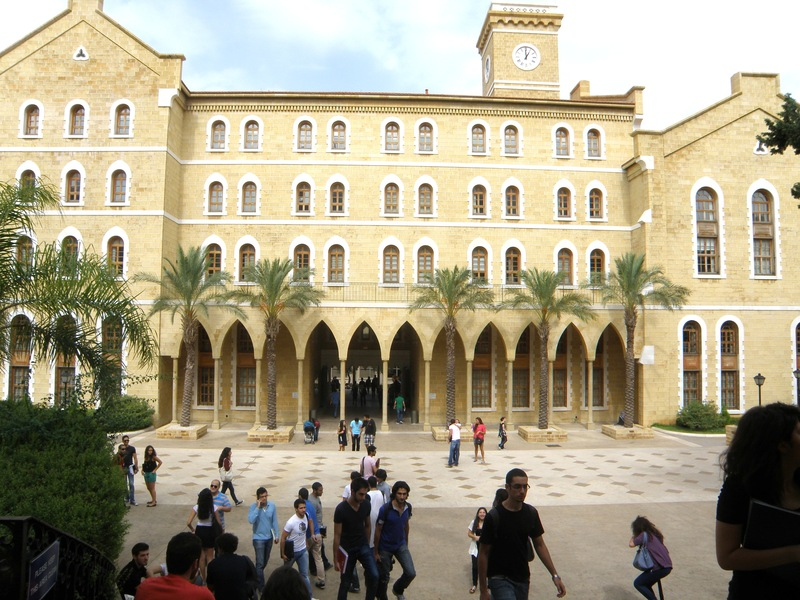
American University of Beirut

Countryman's posting required him to serve as a general rotation officer in each of the mission's four departments: consular, administrative, economic, and political. When officers in the consular and political departments left unexpectedly, Countryman filled their place. In January 1965 he completed his posting and was assigned to the State Department in Washington, D.C. as a staff aide to Averell Harriman.

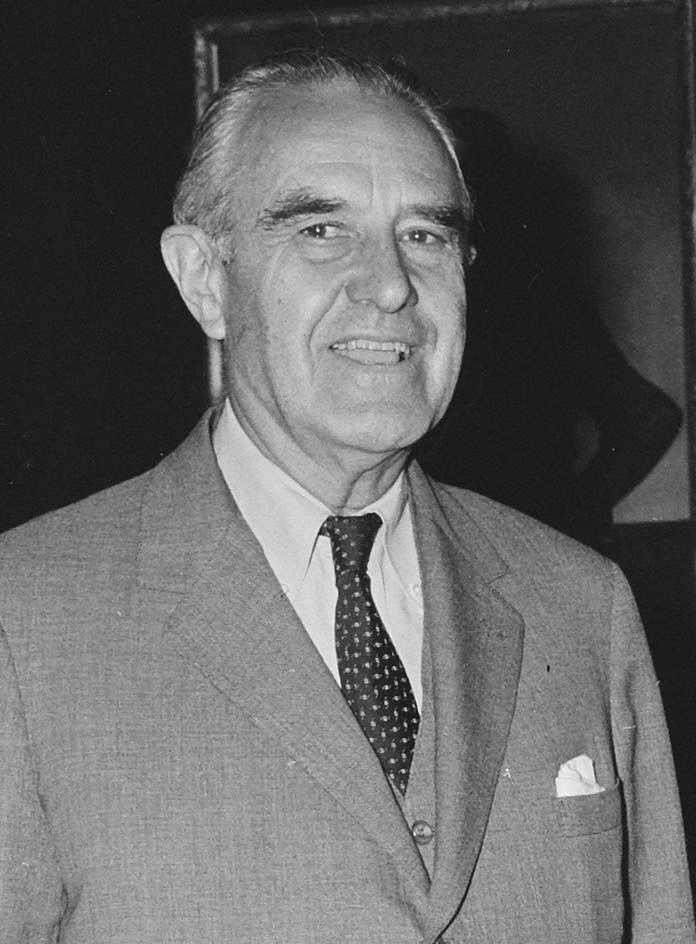
Countryman was assigned to work for veteran statesman Averell Harriman in 1965

In August 1966, Countryman applied for Arabic language training with the intention of concentrating his diplomatic service on one geographic area. He studied Arabic, Islamic law, and Arabic history over a period of 18 months at the American University of Beirut. He also completed a three-month training course as a petroleum attache at Exxon in Houston. During his time in Lebanon, the Six-Day War broke out in Israel and Countryman was assigned to help evacuate US personnel. He himself was evacuated to Athens. When the war ended, Countryman and the other Arabic language students were the first to return to the embassy.

Countryman's next posting was to Saudi Arabia, where he served as Economic Officer and Deputy Principal Officer of the US consulate from May 1968 to 1970. At the time, the British still maintained colonial bases in the area under the supervision of their Political Resident in Bahrain. The British desired an American presence, however, and the US consulate liaised with the British. During his time in Saudi Arabia, Countryman assisted in establishing all the administrative posts for the United States in Bahrain, Qatar, the United Arab Emirates, and Oman. He left this post in the summer of 1971, about a month before these British protectorates gained their independence.

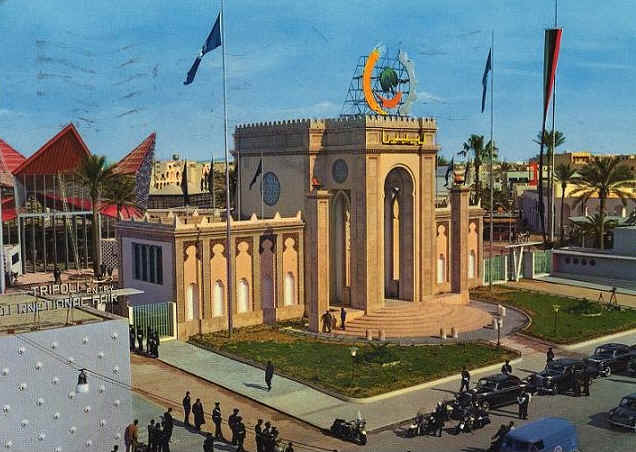
Tripoli International Fair in 1966

In 1970, Countryman was transferred to Libya to serve as chief of the economic section of the diplomatic mission. In the absence of political dialogue with Muammar Gaddafi and Libyan authorities, his office concentrated on economic affairs. His first assignment was to organize the US exhibition at the Tripoli International Fair, for which his group received a distinguished honor award. In 1972, he was elected president of the American Foreign Service Association/Tripoli. In 1973, he was denied re-entry to Libya three times on the pretext that his passport was not written in Arabic.

From 1971 to 1975, Countryman served as Deputy Chief of Mission in Libreville, Gabon, in west-central Africa. During his Gabonese tour, Countryman and his wife also toured South Africa, which was then under apartheid.

As a candidate for senior training, Countryman returned to the United States with his wife in 1975 to attend the United States Army War College in Carlisle, Pennsylvania. His study project paper, "Iran in the View of the Persian Gulf Emirates", was published in May 1976. In 1976, thanks to his diplomatic experience in Saudi Arabia and familiarity with the Persian Gulf states and emirates, plus the research he did at the Army War College, Countryman was tapped for the post of Deputy Director of Arabian Peninsula Affairs (ARP) at the State Department, where he worked until 1978. This period marked an increase in wealth in Saudi Arabia due to its oil reserves, and Congress's passage of a law restricting arms sales to areas that had newfound wealth. Countryman briefed Democratic and Republican Congressmen on the issues, which included Israel's concern over the supply of American weaponry to Saudi Arabia. Countryman explained: "It was in Israel's best interest that the United States had access to oil and there be stable oil and financial markets in the world. So then the issues came down to just how sophisticated the weaponry is that you sell to Saudi Arabia, and what controls do you put in place so you make sure it is not used against Israel". Countryman also briefed US federal agencies on the topics of human rights and narcotics.

In 1978, Countryman was promoted to Acting Director of ARP. He spent much of his time dealing with the Iran hostage crisis through briefing the Saudis and the Gulf States, and working on foreign policy initiatives with other governments and the United Nations. He also helped negotiate a military access agreement between the U.S. and Oman which was signed in September 1980.

== Ambassador to Oman ==
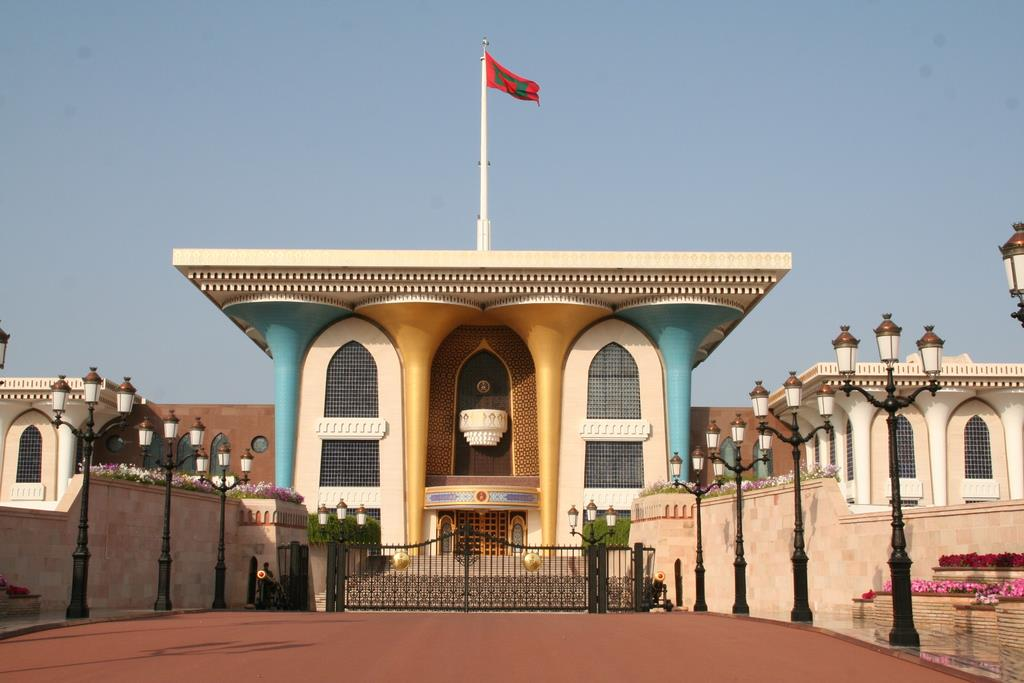
Sultan's Palace in Old Muscat

In 1981, President Ronald Reagan nominated Countryman to be United States Ambassador to Oman. He was confirmed by the United States Senate by unanimous consent and presented his credentials in Muscat on October 14, 1981. Countryman developed the growing relationship between the U.S. and Oman by promoting trade as well as military access; his staff coordinated a 150th anniversary celebration of the Treaty of Amity and Commerce between the two nations. Sultan Qaboos of Oman made a state visit to the U.S. in 1983, to which Countryman was invited, and Countryman arranged for Vice President George Bush to visit the sultanate on one of his visits to the region. Countryman also hosted a large congressional delegation led by Charles H. Percy, chairman of the Senate Foreign Relations Committee.

During Countryman's ambassadorship, the Iran–Iraq War erupted. Ambassadors for both Iraq and Iran were present in Oman, and while Countryman was friendly with the Iraqi ambassador, he adhered to U.S. foreign policy and did not acknowledge the Iranian ambassador at all. Countryman's tour was originally set to be three years, but he stayed on an additional year to act as an advisor for the renegotiation of the U.S.–Oman military access agreement. He left his post on July 29, 1985.

In 1985, Countryman moved back to Washington, D.C. to complete an 18-month senior fellowship at the Center for Strategic and International Studies. He researched and wrote a paper on the subject of "Oil and Security in the Persian Gulf", which he then developed into an all-day seminar for the Foreign Service Institute. He retired from the United States Foreign Service in March 1987.

== Later activities ==
Countryman spent the next five years working in real estate in Georgetown. He then worked several years as Executive Director of the Mission for Peace and Cooperation in the Middle East, under the auspices of Search for Common Ground. In this position, he organized seminars on conflict resolution for Arabs, Israelis, and Iranians.

In 1992, he became associate publisher of CEO Update, a newsletter that covers jobs in the nonprofit sector.

== Personal life and death ==
Countryman's first wife was a French native whom he met during his tour in Istanbul; they were divorced before he started his tour in Libya in 1971. He met his second wife, Illona Zwolski Vachon, during his tour in Libya; she was working as a secretary at the U.S. Embassy in Benghazi. They married in Malta. Illona later became a senior analyst for the United States Agency for International Development. The couple had one daughter, Vanessa Countryman, who has served as Secretary of the U.S. Securities and Exchange Commission (SEC).

Countryman spoke about his diplomatic experiences to students at his high school alma mater during that school's annual Career Day. He was inducted into the Xavier High School Hall of Fame in 2010, sixty years after his graduation.

Countryman died of pneumonia in Loudoun, Virginia, on December 14, 2024, six weeks before his 92nd birthday.

== Filmography ==
Year	Title	Role	Notes
1937	The Frame-Up	Young boy	uncredited
1937	The Duke Comes Back	Jimmy Foster	credited as John Russell
1938	Always Goodbye	Roddy	credited as John Russell
1938	Prison Break	Jackie	credited as John Russell
1938	Five of a Kind	Dickie	credited as John Russell
1939	Jesse James	Jesse James Jr.	credited as John Russell
1939	The Man Who Dared	Ted Carter	credited as John Russell
1939	Sabotage	Matt Grayson II	credited as Johnny Russell
1939	Mr. Smith Goes to Washington	The Hopper Boys	credited as John Russell
1940	The Blue Bird	Tyltyl	credited as Johnny Russell
1940	Florian	Andy, age 6	uncredited
1940	The Man I Married	Ricky Hoffman	credited as Johnny Russell
1940	Lady with Red Hair	Dudley Carter	credited as Johnnie Russell

== Sources ==
=== Books ===
- Bradley, Larry C. (1980). Jesse James: The Making of a Legend. Larren Publishers. ISBN 978-0-9604370-0-9. "johnnie russell."
- Countryman, John Russell (1961). The German Element in the Writings of Thomas Wolfe. University of Miami.
- Cozad, W. Lee (2006). More Magnificent Mountain Movies (The Silver Screen Years) 1940–2004. Rim of the World Historical Society. ISBN 978-0-9723372-3-6.
- "Visit of Sultan Qaboos of Oman", Department of State Publication: Department and Foreign Service series, United States Department of State, 1983
- Holmstrom, John (1996). The Moving Picture Boy: An international encyclopaedia from 1895 to 1995. Michael Russell. ISBN 978-0-85955-178-6.
- Kasson, John F. (2014). The Little Girl Who Fought the Great Depression: Shirley Temple and 1930s America. W. W. Norton & Company. ISBN 978-0-393-24418-2.

=== Journals ===
- "Passing of John Budd Long, American Newspaperman", Congressional Record: Proceedings and Debates of the 87th Congress, Second Session, vol. 108, United States Government Printing Office, 1962, p. 6778
- "Personals". Editor & Publisher. 71 (28). 1938.
- "AFSA News". Foreign Service Journal. American Foreign Service Association. 1972.

=== Newsletters ===
- "African Affairs". Department of State Newsletter. 1971.
- "Officers Selected for '75–'76 Training". News Letter. United States Department of State. 1975.
- United States Department of State (August 3, 1981), "John R. Countryman sworn in as United States Ambassador to the Sultanate of Oman (press release)", Press Releases
