= Baby Burlesks =

1932 - 1933 film series

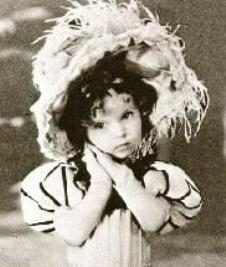
- Shirley Temple in Glad Rags to Riches (1933)
- Directed by: Charles Lamont; Ray Nazarro
- Written by: Jack Hays; Charles Lamont
- Produced by: Jack Hays
- Starring: Shirley Temple; Georgie Billings; Danny Boone, Jr; Eugene Butler; Marilyn Granas; Philip Hurlic; Gloria Anne Mack; Arthur J. Maskery; Jimmie Milliken; Dorian Samson; Georgie Smith
- Cinematography: Sidney Wagner; Dwight Warren
- Edited by: William Austin; Howard Dillinger; Arthur Ellis
- Music by: Alfonso Corelli
- Distributed by: Universal Pictures; Educational Film Exchanges, Inc. Fox Film
- Running time: 10-11 minutes
- Country: United States
- Language: English

Baby Burlesks was a series of Pre-Code short films produced by Educational Pictures in the early 1930s. The series featured three-year-old Shirley Temple in her first screen appearances. In her autobiography, Temple describes the Baby Burlesks series as "a cynical exploitation of our childish innocence," and says that the short films were sometimes racist or sexist.

== Filmography ==
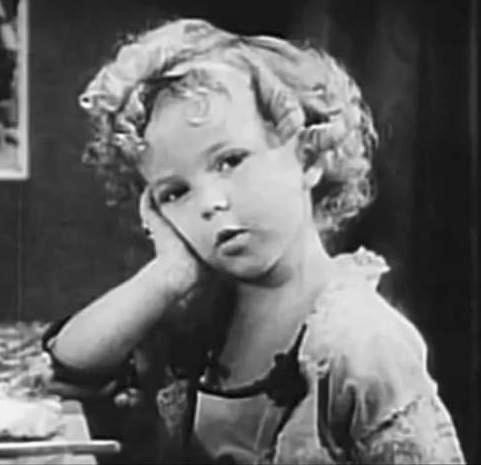
Shirley Temple in Glad Rags to Riches

All eight films in the Baby Burlesks series were produced by Jack Hays and directed by Charles Lamont, except the first, Runt Page, which was directed by Ray Nazarro. As a star, Temple, received $10 a day. In 2009, all eight films were available on videocassette and DVD.

- Runt Page: Jan 1, 1932
- War Babies: Sept 18, 1932
- Pie Covered Wagon: Oct 30, 1932
- Glad Rags to Riches: Feb 5, 1933
- Kid in Hollywood: March 14, 1933
- Polly Tix in Washington: April 11, 1933
- The Kid's Last Fight: April 23, 1933
- Kid 'in' Africa: Oct 6, 1933

== See also ==
- Shirley Temple filmography
