= War Babies (1932 film) =

1932 film

- Directed by: Charles Lamont
- Produced by: Jack Hays
- Starring: Shirley Temple as Gloria; Georgie Smith
- Distributed by: Educational Film Exchanges
- Release date: September 18, 1932
- Running time: 11 minutes
- Country: United States
- Language: English

The full film

War Babies is a 1932 American comedy short film directed by Charles Lamont. It is the second in a series of eight one-reelers that satirized adult films and themes called Baby Burlesks. The casts in the series are pre-schoolers dressed in adult costumes on top and diapers fastened with large safety pins on the bottom. War Babies takes place in a cafe, where children pose as adults, specifically musicians, soldiers, a bar keep, and a dancer.

The short film stars Shirley Temple, who was three at the time of filming. War Babies was Temple's first speaking role and she has her first onscreen kiss with Eugene Butler. Others in the cast are Georgie Billings, Philip Hurlic, Ted Frye, Georgie Smith, and Ashley Shepherd. In 2009, the film was available on DVD.

== Plot ==
A group of soldiers enjoy an evening at the Buttermilk Petes Cafe while being entertained by a dancer (Temple). The soldiers fawn over the dancer, which causes rivalries between the men. A captain (Smith) argues with the other soldiers that the dancer is his girlfriend and buys her a lollipop to confirm. As the soldiers drink milk and enjoy the music and dancing, a visiting sergeant (Butler) enters the cafe and flirts with the dancer. The captain and the sergeant argue over the dancer and take turns wooing her with more candy.

While the men argue, a messenger appears, alerting the soldiers that they have been called to action. The cafe becomes chaos as the soldiers grab their weapons and leave. The captain says goodbye to the dancer, but while they hug, the sergeant emerges from a side room and kisses the dancer behind the captain's back. The two soldiers leave while the dancer waves goodbye to both men and wipes her mouth.
