= List of Father Knows Best episodes =

Father Knows Best is an American sitcom starring Robert Young, Jane Wyatt, Elinor Donahue, Billy Gray, and Lauren Chapin. The series, which began on radio in 1949, aired as a television show for six seasons and 203 episodes. Created by Ed James, Father Knows Best follows the lives of the Andersons, a middle-class family living in the town of Springfield. The state in which Springfield is located is never specified, but it is generally accepted to be located in the Midwestern United States.

The television series debuted on CBS in October 1954. It ran for one season and was canceled by CBS but picked up by NBC, where it remained for three seasons. After cancellation by NBC in 1958, the series returned to CBS, where it aired until May 1960.

== Episodes ==
=== Series overview ===
Season	Episodes	Originally released		
Season	Episodes	First released	Last released	Network
1	26	October 3, 1954	March 27, 1955	CBS
2	37	August 31, 1955	May 30, 1956	NBC
3	37	September 16, 1956	June 5, 1957	NBC
4	33	September 25, 1957	June 11, 1958	NBC
5	38	September 15, 1958	June 1, 1959	CBS
6	32	October 5, 1959	May 23, 1960	CBS

=== Season 1 (1954–55) ===
No. overall	No. in season	Title	Directed by	Written by	Original release date
1	1	"Bud Takes Up the Dance"	James Neilson	Story by : Roswell Rogers & Paul West; Teleplay by : Dorothy Cooper	October 3, 1954
Betty tells Jim and Margaret that Bud asked a girl named Marcia (Susan Whitney) to go to a dance with him – his first dance, and his first date. The family finds out that he is trying to learn how to dance from a book over 50 years old. Bud's been practicing how to dance up in his room and making a lot of noise. The family pretends not to know what he's doing. Margaret tells Jim that they've been asked to be chaperones at the dance. Jim doesn't want Bud to be surprised when his parents are at the dance, so he goes to talk to Bud. When Jim tells Bud he knows about Bud going to the dance, an embarrassed Bud locks himself in the basement. Betty tells Jim that she's heard that Marcia is quite a "fireball". Jim goes to talk to Marcia and she's hiding in the basement. He learns that Marcia is shy and insecure and she doesn't want Bud to find out she cannot dance. Jim offers to teach Marcia how to dance and promises not to tell anyone. Jim then has Betty help Bud learn some dance steps. Jim also tricks Bud into being more confident. Bud and Marcia have a nice time at the dance.
2	2	"Lesson in Citizenship"	Peter Tewksbury	Paul West	October 10, 1954
Jim, dismayed at his children's laziness, lectures them in the importance of good citizenship and cheerful volunteering. At school, Kathy's teacher mentions doing good for the community and would like donations of clothing. Kathy takes one of Jim's good suits and brings it to school. A man named Will Potter (Eddy Waller) receives the suit and is thrilled. Bud tells Jim that they need someone to head the entertainment committee for an upcoming father and son banquet. Jim thinks Bud volunteered but then he hears Bud calling a friend and volunteering him. Meanwhile, Betty sees an automobile accident, but doesn't want to get involved. She's not really sure who was at fault. A man named Greg Patterson asks her to be a witness for him and because he's handsome, she says yes. Things get complicated when Mrs. Paisley, the woman that was in the accident with Greg, calls Jim for help. Will Potter goes looking for a job. When asked for a reference, Will sees Jim's name in the suit and uses that. The job agency calls Jim and after Kathy says that is the man that got the suit, Jim helps. Greg comes by and tells Betty she doesn't have to be a witness as his insurance is covering everything. Bud asks Jim if he's found any entertainers yet. In the end, Jim gets Greg to play piano for the banquet. Plus, Jim gets Will and his wife Edna to do a dance routine. Will and Edna are such a hit, they get signed up for other performances.
3	3	"The Motor Scooter"	William D. Russell	Story by : Dick Conway & Paul West; Teleplay by : Harry Clork & Sumner Arthur Long	October 17, 1954
Jim purchases a motor scooter for Bud for $50. Before he can show it to Margaret, Betty asks him if she's getting fat. Jim inadvertently gives the wrong answer. Margaret does not want Bud to have the scooter because she doesn't believe he is responsible enough. Jim backs down and hides it in the garage. After the children are in bed, Jim tries one more time to talk Margaret into keeping the scooter. Margaret forces Jim to sell it to Fred Hartley, who originally wanted it. Jim gets tricked into selling it for $40. Betty wants to wear a low-cut dress on a date and Jim is against that. Wanting to give Bud something, Jim gives him $20. Later, an excited Bud comes running into the house. He takes Jim and Margaret outside and shows them the scooter. Bud bought the scooter from Mr. Hartley for $30 because Mrs. Hartley didn't want her son to have it. Something Bud says makes Margaret believe he'll be responsible enough to keep it. Even Margaret takes a ride on the scooter.
4	4	"Football Tickets"	Peter Tewksbury	Paul West	October 24, 1954
Jim has two tickets for the most important football game of the year. Because Margaret cannot go, Jim will run a contest between his children to see who goes with. Betty wins. Bob Harris, a friend of Jim's, comes by his office looking for a ticket to the game. He says he will buy several insurance policies from Jim if he gets the extra ticket. Jim has to tell Betty she cannot go. Margaret suggests Jim give his ticket to Bob and Betty can still go. The only problem is the tickets are in a shirt that Margaret sent to the laundry. Jim eventually finds the shirt, but the tickets aren't in the pocket. Jim winds up buying two tickets from the laundry driver. Jim is upset because he believes the tickets were actually his. Margaret tells him she found his tickets on the dresser. She also knows where Jim can get another ticket so that Betty, Bud, Kathy, Bob and Jim can all go to the game. Jim goes to get the extra ticket from Bill Lawrence (James Dobson). It turns out that Bill does not have the ticket anymore, but he knows someone else that has an extra one. It is halftime at the game and Betty, Bud, Kathy, and Bob are wondering where Jim is. Jim winds up sitting in the cheering section.
5	5	"Live My Own Life"	William D. Russell	Story by : Roswell Rogers & Paul West; Teleplay by : Roswell Rogers	October 31, 1954
Bud is tired of being told what to do by his parents and wants to live his own life. Jim tells Margaret it is just a phase boys go through. Bud tells his friend Claude (Jack Grinnage) that his parents treat him like a little kid. Jim is overhearing the conversation. Claude tells Bud he should move out and tells him of a place for rent. Bud fantasizes about his family missing him and how hard they try to make him move back. Jim tries to use reverse psychology and tells Bud he should move out. This backfires when Bud decides to go. Margaret is concerned, but Jim does not think Bud will actually leave. But Bud is going and Jim drives him to see Mr. Engel. Mr. Engel is renting the room over his feed store. Jim still doesn't think Bud will go through with the move, but Bud does. Bud almost immediately regrets his decision. Later, Jim is talking to Mr. Engel. Mr. Engels suggests a way for Bud to move home again without hurting anyone's pride.
6	6	"Grandpa Jim's Rejuvenation"	William D. Russell	Story by : Roswell Rogers & Paul West; Teleplay by : Phil Davis	November 7, 1954
Jim gets invited to play badminton with friends and starts to remember (with rose-colored glasses) his youth and college days. Everyone in the family is worried Jim will hurt himself. Jim looks at his children and sees how fast they are growing up. Now, he feels very old and that his best days are behind him. Jim receives a letter from Eddie Gilbert (Donald Curtis), who he hasn't seen since high school. Eddie says he will be in town the next day and how he's been having trouble with his rheumatism. He's also a grandfather. Jim is feeling even older and decides to not play badminton. That night, Jim has a dream about feeling old and trying to play badminton with an Old Man (Burt Mustin). Margaret and the children hatch a plan to make him feel young again. Eddie comes by and Jim is surprised and pleased to see how youthful he looks. Eddie tells Jim how much freedom to do things he and his wife have since the children are grown up. Jim is feeling better about himself and his age.
7	7	"Bud's Encounter with the Law"	William D. Russell	Story by : Roswell Rogers & Paul West; Teleplay by : Roswell Rogers	November 14, 1954
Kathy plays with the new washing machine and keeps throwing everything in it. Meanwhile, Bud and his friend Claude are building a raft out of some old oil drums. Kathy puts Betty's items for her "Girls in Government Club" in the machine and they get ruined. Kathy also puts the mail in, including a letter to Bud from the police. The only part that is legible is that he is to appear at the police station within 7 days. Bud thinks he's in trouble because he took the oil drums from an alley behind Mr. Trumble's (William Fawcett) place. Jim knows Trumble's just the type of guy to raise a fuss over that. Bud panics when a policeman (Stafford Repp) comes to the door. But Sgt. Rice is there to escort Betty to city hall. Jim and Bud go to see Mr. Trumble. They figure out that Trumble didn't call the police on Bud and Trumble buys an insurance policy from Jim. Back at home, Sgt. Rice comes by with Betty. Rice tells Bud that the letter was sent to him because he left his wallet at the police station when he got his bike license. Rice tells Jim that the Chief of Police wants to see him first thing Monday morning. Now Jim wonders what he may have done.
8	8	"Thanksgiving Day"	William D. Russell	Story by : Ed James; Teleplay by : Dorothy Cooper	November 21, 1954
Jim learns that Kathy wrote the best Thanksgiving poem in her class. He comes home early to tell the family the good news. Jim goes really overboard in his thought that there is a future celebrity in the family. To celebrate, Jim suggests going out the next day for Thanksgiving dinner. Kathy leaves the room. When Betty reads the poem, Jim thinks it is not as good as it should be. Jim feels bad because he called just about everyone and bragged about the poem. The newspaper calls and says that the school's Thanksgiving program will be televised. They want Kathy to recite her poem. Kathy overhears Jim say how bad the poem is. The next day, Jim finds out that Bud and Betty will be eating Thanksgiving dinner elsewhere. Jim turns on the TV to watch Kathy, but instead of reading her poem, she starts to cry. Jim changes his mind about eating out. The school drives Kathy home. She tells Margaret that she didn't read the poem because she heard Jim say it wasn't good. Jim apologizes to Kathy and Bud and Betty wind up coming home. The family have a dinner of hamburgers together. Rod O'Connor as Announcer.
9	9	"Second Honeymoon"	Peter Tewksbury	Paul West	November 28, 1954
Jim's friend Fred comes by the office and tells Jim that he and his wife are off to a lodge for the weekend. Jim says that would be great but he has children to worry about. Fred invites Jim and Margaret along and Jim calls home, but Margaret is busy with the kids and cannot talk. Jim comes home and tells Margaret they should go away for the weekend. He says that Betty and Bud are old enough to watch the house and Kathy by themselves. Jim tries to tell the children his plans, but isn't able to. Jim and Margaret try again and are surprised when the children are anxious for them to be out of the house. Betty even says she'll just cancel her date with Ralph. So off Jim and Margaret go, although on the drive out of town they are already missing the kids. Ralph keeps calling Betty, so she decides to stop answering the phone. Jim and Margaret arrive at the lodge and all they can do is talk about the children. It is not long before they call the children, but there is no answer. Fred and his wife Lila show up and say that the four of them will have a lot of fun. When they still cannot reach the children by phone, Margaret and Jim race back home, only to find everything is fine. Back at the lodge Jim and Margaret are now enjoying the rustic room they booked, and out from an adjoining room come Betty, Bud and Kathy to say goodnight.
10	10	"Typical Father"	William D. Russell	Story by : Roswell Rogers & Paul West; Teleplay by : Dorothy Cooper	December 5, 1954
Because of what he reads in the paper, Jim is obsessed with the idea that his 17-year-old daughter might elope. Margaret says Betty is too level-headed for that. Betty has been rehearsing a school play with her co-star, Armand Bradley. She comes home with a dreamy look in her eyes. The next day, Jim asks Betty about Armand and she gives a glowing description of him. Margaret suggests that Betty bring Armand over that evening so the family can meet him. Betty doesn't want to scare Armand off but reluctantly agrees to ask him over. After meeting Armand, Margaret and Jim leave the two alone. Betty and Armand discuss the play which has an elopement as part of the plot. Jim overhears part of the conversation and starts to worry. Jim is spying on the couple through an outside window. When Betty gets a road map and a suitcase for props for the play, Jim jumps to the wrong conclusion. Jim and Margaret follow Armand to the Justice of the Peace, where they find Armand acting as a witness as his father officiates at a wedding. Jim finds out that Armand had no intention of getting married and Armand explains about the props for the play. Embarrassed, Jim and Margaret return home to be confronted by Betty and have to explain where they were and why they were there.
11	11	"Margaret Goes Dancing"	William D. Russell	Roswell Rogers	December 12, 1954
Margaret's friend Myrtle Davis (Vivi Janiss) tells her that she and her husband Ed (Robert Foulk) are taking dance lessons. Myrtle asks Margaret to have her and Jim join them. Margaret doesn't think Jim would be interested. Something the children say makes Margaret decide to take the lessons. Jim comes home and he can tell right away that Margaret is up to something. Margaret tries to trick Jim into the lessons, but he finds out the plan when Ed gives him a call. Jim doesn't want to go and they have a slight argument. Jim goes to the club, where he has a boring time. Margaret goes to the dance lesson, which is a bit too much for her. She leaves the lesson early, claiming she has a headache. Jim comes home and when he finds out Margaret is already home, he serenades her from outside on his banjo. They both realize they liked their life the way it is.
12	12	"The Christmas Story"	William D. Russell	Story by : Roswell Rogers & Paul West; Teleplay by : Roswell Rogers	December 19, 1954
It is Christmas Eve and Jim is upset with his children's materialistic approach to the holiday season. Jim insists the family drive to the mountains to chop down the family Christmas tree. The rest of the family hopes it doesn't take too long. Margaret has presents to deliver and Betty has to dress for a big party that evening. It starts to snow and the rest of the family want to turn back, but Jim keeps going. Their car gets stuck in a snow drift and they need to find a phone. They find a mountain lodge that appears to be closed for the season. Looking through the window they see a phone so they break into the building. The phone isn't working. A man named Nick (Wallace Ford), apparently the owner, comes in from outside and welcomes the family. Despite the family wanting to get home, Nick insists on cooking them a meal. Kathy is sad because she doesn't think Santa will be able to find them, but Nick says not to worry. Nick and Bud bring in a Christmas tree and the family make decorations for it. Nick finds some things that Jim and Margaret can give the children as Christmas gifts. When ranger Les Turner (William Traylor) shows up, the family finds out that Nick is a vagrant and shouldn't be there. Jim talks Les into letting everyone stay and to not let Nick know they know his secret. Meanwhile, Nick put some of his belongings in a bag and is walking outside. Kathy sees him and thinks he's Santa Claus. Les brings Nick back into the lodge and tells him he needs to take care of his guests.
13	13	"Sparrow in the Window"	Peter Tewksbury	Paul West	December 26, 1954
It is Sunday and Margaret brings Jim breakfast in bed just to be nice. Bud and Betty barge in and ask if Jim's sick. Kathy comes in and winds up ruining his meal. It is raining outside and Jim is not able to go golfing. Kathy finds an injured bird outside one of the windows at home. She brings the bird inside and makes a bed for it in one of Jim's hats. Kathy names the sparrow Mr. Quigley and the family tries to feed it. Before Kathy goes to bed, Jim tries to delicately tell her that there is no guarantee the bird will survive. Kathy prays for the bird. Jim calls Ed, a doctor friend, who raises birds and asks his advice. Ed says there is nothing the family can do but wait and hope. During the night everyone but Kathy gets up to check on the bird. The next morning, Kathy wakes her parents up saying Mr. Quigley is gone. They find him flying around the house and then it lands on the window sill. Kathy is able to get the bird to perch on her finger. Kathy wants to keep it, but Jim talks her into setting Mr. Quigley free.
14	14	"Boy's Week"	William D. Russell	Story by : Ed James; Teleplay by : Dorothy Cooper	January 2, 1955
Jim gets a call at his office from neighbor Bill Brown. Bill says that Kathy threw a baseball and broke one of his windows for the third time in the month. Jim goes home and Kathy claims she didn't do it. Jim tells Margaret that the children have a complete disregard for responsibility. For a school project, Bud's class is given jobs in the real world. Bud is hoping to be mayor. Jim takes Kathy to Mr. Brown's house and because of something Jim wants Kathy to try, another window is broken. When they go back to the car, Jim gets a ticket for parking in front of a driveway. He tells the Officer (Dick Wessel) he did not do it and another car must have pushed his car there. Bud comes home and tells the family he is Traffic Court Judge for a day. It turns out it will be the same day that Jim has to go to court. Jim is now extra nice to Kathy because she will be his witness in court. He also is nice to Bud. It is Monday morning and court is in session. Jim is called and pleads not guilty. Jim presents his case and Kathy is called to the stand. Bud finds Jim guilty and fines him $5. When Margaret steps up and says Bud cannot act that way, she is fined $5 for contempt. Jim threatens Bud and Judge Mitchell fines Jim $5 more. And Judge Mitchell still finds an angry Jim guilty. The Judge drives Bud and Kathy home and defends to Jim what Bud did. Jim admits he overreacted and says he is proud of Bud.
15	15	"A Friend of Old George's"	William D. Russell	Story by : Roswell Rogers & Paul West; Teleplay by : Dorothy Cooper	January 9, 1955
It is Kathy's birthday and the family prepares for the celebration. Bud tells Jim there's a man named Lyle Hiebert (Parley Baer) at the door. Jim doesn't know who that is. Lyle claims to be a friend of Jim's old friend George Newnens. Lyle doesn't seem to know much about George and Jim starts to realize that Lyle is just an acquaintance of George's. And now that he's here, Jim cannot seem to get rid of him. Kathy thinks her party will be ruined. Lyle manages to invite himself to dinner and mentions that it was his birthday yesterday. Lyle mispronounces everyone's names and helps Kathy blow out the candles on her cake. Jim finds a way to get Lyle to leave and they rush off to the circus. But when they get there, it is sold out. Lyle shows up and it turns out he's the circus manager. He gets tickets for the family.
16	16	"Bud the Snob"	William D. Russell	Story by : Roswell Rogers & Paul West; Teleplay by : Roswell Rogers	January 16, 1955
Betty tells Jim and Margaret that a lot of people at school think Bud's a snob. Jim goes to talk to Bud and Bud says he just gets tongue-tied around girls. Jim gives him a bit of a pep talk and Bud says he'll try. At school, Bud asks his friend Claude how to talk to girls. Claude gives him some advice, but things don't go well when he tries to talk to Liz. Back at home, Betty arranges for Virginia to call Bud. But when he gets on the phone, he panics and says good-bye. When a girl scout comes to the door to sell cookies, Bud thinks Betty set it up and he hides in the closet. In the closet he finds Kathy's Halloween mask. He puts it on and now has the confidence to talk to the girl scout. Bud sets up a date with Virginia, but then realizes he cannot go because he cannot wear the mask outside. Bud talks Jim into hosting a masquerade party at home to show his friends he is not a snob. It is the night of the party and the mask goes missing, causing Bud to say he will not join the party. Jim tricks Bud by pretending to draw a mask on his face with makeup. Bud is the hit of the party until he sees himself in a mirror and realizes there is no make-up. But it is not long before he is talking to Virginia and having a good time. Note: Most of the scenes shot in this episode were later reused in the season five episode 11 also called "Bud the Snob." The only things added were a new introductory scene and closing scene.
17	17	"The Promised Playhouse"	William D. Russell	Story by : Roswell Rogers & Paul West; Teleplay by : Roswell Rogers	January 23, 1955
There's a rodeo coming to town in a couple weeks and Bud and his friends can get in for half price if they come with a parent. Bud asks Jim to promise to take him. Jim says he will not make a promise he might not be able to keep as he might have to work that day. Jim then tells Bud the story of when Kathy had the measles 4 years ago. To get Kathy to take her medicine, Jim promises she can have a playhouse in the back yard. He also promises that he'll eat dinner and sleep with her in it. A month goes by and Jim forgets about the promise. Bud wants Jim to promise to talk to him about a job in a bakery Bud wants. Betty tells Margaret that she wants to break a date with Burt. Jim insists she keep her word and go out with the boy. Margaret wants to cancel an evening with Myrtle and Ed Davis, but Jim says no. Without Jim knowing it, Kathy built a playhouse that day. She now insists he keep his promise to eat dinner and sleep with her in the house. Myrtle and Ed arrive and Ed brought slides from a fishing trip he and Jim went on. Jim goes to says hello to Ed and he hopes Kathy will forget about him, but she doesn't. Jim goes back outside and hopes Kathy will fall asleep soon. Kathy finally falls asleep and Jim brings her in and puts her to bed. Turns out Kathy wasn't really asleep, but she pretended to be because she knew Jim wanted to see Ed's slides.
18	18	"Jim, the Farmer"	William D. Russell	Roswell Rogers	January 30, 1955
Stressed out from the daily grind at work, Jim decides to quit the insurance business. He talks his friend Lloyd (John Alvin) into running his office. Jim would like to move out West and run a farm. Betty asks Margaret if Jim is serious about moving. Margaret says he's serious, but they will not be moving. She tells Betty he's gone through phases like this before. Jim tells Margaret that he's putting an ad in the paper to rent their house. Jim calls Miss Thomas (Sarah Selby), his secretary, to see how things are going and she says Lloyd is handling everything fine. As the day goes on, Jim keeps asking if the office has called him. Jim calls the office again asking how Lloyd is doing and Miss Thomas keeps saying just great. Even though in actuality, things are a mess. Margaret goes to the office and thinking things are fine, asks Lloyd to make up a problem. He says he doesn't have to make anything up because there are plenty of problems and they call Jim. When Margaret gets home, Jim races off to the office. He later finds out that Margaret was there and figures she had Lloyd stage the problems. After a long talk with Grace (Mary Young), the office cleaning lady, Jim realizes his place is there.
19	19	"Father of the Year"	William D. Russell	Story by : Roswell Rogers & Paul West; Teleplay by : Roswell Rogers	February 6, 1955
The local newspaper is hosting a Father of the Year contest. Betty, Bud, and Kathy want to nominate Jim. Jim finds out and is overjoyed that his children want to submit an entry. But the kids cannot think of anything to actually write. Margaret tries to give them some suggestions. But the children just have a hard time putting their feelings into words. At dinner, Bud asks if he could borrow Jim's car. Joe Phillips has a license and the boys want to drive to Joe's uncle's farm. Jim refuses because he does not trust Joe's driving and Bud is upset. Betty receives an expensive pin from a boy named Donald. Jim insists that she return it as she barely knows the boy. Figuring that Kathy is the only one left to nominate him, Jim does the couple things she asks him to do. The next day, Jim takes the pin to the jeweler to see what it is worth. Jim finds out the pin cost $5 and Donald bought six of them to give to girls. Bud tells Jim that the only reason Joe wanted the guys to go to his uncle's was to dig ditches for him. Bud apologizes to Jim for getting mad at him. Betty tells Jim she found out about the other pins. The children eventually realize that everything Jim did was for their own good and they write a nice entry. William Fawcett as Trumble.
20	20	"The Mink Coat"	William D. Russell	Story by : Roswell Rogers & Paul West; Teleplay by : Roswell Rogers	February 13, 1955
Jim calls a family meeting because there has been too much spending recently and they must cut expenses. Just when he tells everyone to save money, Jim gets a deal on a mink coat and buys it. Though Margaret loves the coat, she feels she would be showing off when she wears it. Jim tries to reassure her that it is OK to wear the coat. A Mrs. Morell (June Vincent) sees Margaret in her coat, and proceeds to ask Jim for a large donation for the Women's League. Jim reluctantly gives a large amount of money. Jim later gets a call from the bank saying his account is overdrawn. The paperboy comes by to collect his money and Jim doesn't have enough on him. Margaret and Myrtle Davis come home from buying some new dresses. Jim starts to think that the mink coat is changing the family's perspective on life. Margaret and Jim come to an understanding about material things.
21	21	"The Matchmaker"	William D. Russell	Story by : Ed James; Teleplay by : Dorothy Cooper	February 20, 1955
Margaret's cousin Louise (Lyn Guild) and her boyfriend Tom Goodwin (William Hudson) will be coming for a visit. Margaret is planning a quiet romantic dinner and hopes Tom will propose to Louise. She also tells her children to make plans to be somewhere else. Jim tells Bud that women like Margaret cannot help but try to get single men married off. That evening, Louise arrives first. Tom then comes by bringing flowers for Louise. Jim and Tom try to talk about Tom's new car, but Margaret keeps bringing up Louise. At dinner, Jim has a hard time seeing the food because it is so dark. Suddenly, Bud and Kathy show up and Margaret has to send them away. Before dessert, Margaret tries to give Louise and Tom some alone time. Jim listens in a little bit and finds out Tom is talking about his car. Betty runs into the house and says she hates all men. More interruptions follow. Tom gives Betty some advice about her boyfriend. While trying to fix Bud's radio, Tom winds up blowing a fuse. When Bud replaces the fuse, Tom and Louise are kissing. Louise took the advice that Tom gave Betty, and proposed to Tom.
22	22	"Bud the Bridesmaid"	William D. Russell	Story by : Ed James; Teleplay by : Dorothy Cooper	February 27, 1955
Margaret's cousin Louise is getting married the next day and she is very nervous. Tom is getting some last minute jitters as well. The wedding preparations are underway with food, chairs, flowers and more. Jim thought it was going to be a small wedding, but things seem to be getting bigger. Jim is starting to get concerned about the price. But after talking to Margaret for a while, Jim is happy with the way things are proceeding. Louise suddenly comes in the house and says the wedding is canceled. Tom comes back and tells Jim all he did was mention an old girlfriend he had before he met Louise. Jim tries to talk to Louise but she says her mind is made up. Tom also tries to talk to her, but gets nowhere. The Reverend comes by for what he thought would be the wedding rehearsal. Margaret comes up with a plan. The rehearsal goes on with Bud reluctantly standing in for Louise. It is not long before Louise makes up with Tom.
23	23	"Proud Father"	William D. Russell	Story by : Roswell Rogers & Paul West; Teleplay by : Dorothy Cooper	March 6, 1955
Jim runs into Roger Garland (John Gallaudet), an old friend, who brags about his family members and all their achievements. Bud tells Jim he's hiding from Beanie Brugendorfer, the school bully. Kathy is worried about a loose tooth. Jim tells them that they cannot be afraid and must stand up to their problems. Jim points out Betty not being afraid of a dance performance she is to give in front of a large audience. The more he talks about it, the more panicked Betty gets and she faints. When Betty asks that someone else do her dance routine, Jim tries to give her a pep talk. The next day, Betty is still worried she will forget part of the dance. After Roger claims he has laryngitis, Margaret volunteers Jim to MC the performance, but he says he is not a public speaker. And if his kids cannot stand up for themselves, he is a failure as a father and he himself has no confidence. Jim lets Margaret know that he said this for his kids benefit and he intends to speak at the performance. Kathy comes by and says she pulled out her tooth. Bud and Betty say they will both be at the performance. That night, Jim introduces Betty. At first she does well, but then she forgets part of her dance. Beanie is there and starts laughing at her. Bud drags Beanie out of the auditorium. When they come back in, Beanie apologizes to Betty. Betty continues her dance and gives a great performance. The next day Jim runs into Roger again and Jim now brags about his children. Roger tells Jim he did not have laryngitis, he really had stage fright.
24	24	"Father Delivers the Papers"	William D. Russell	Dane Lussier & Roswell Rogers	March 13, 1955
Mr. Collins (Dabbs Greer), the newspaper route manager, comes by to talk to Jim. He tells Jim that Bud is slacking in his paper delivery route and there have been numerous complaints. Mr. Collins says he'll have to take the route away from Bud. Jim assures him there will be no more mistakes and Mr. Collins agrees to give Bud one more chance. Mr. Collins leaves and Jim talks to Bud. Bud says the people on the route can be quite difficult, but he agrees to give it another try. Bud is on his route and while he's looking at a pretty girl, he crashes his bike. He cannot finish his route because he hurt his elbow. Jim sends Bud out to finish the route. While trying to get his bike from the garage, a tent falls on him and hurts his back. A doctor checks him out and the back is slightly injured. Jim now has to finish the route for Bud. He does run into some difficult people and then it starts raining. Mr. Collins comes by again to talk to Jim, but he's not there. There were more complaints. He finds out that Bud is hurt and Jim is on the route. Margaret goes out to find Jim. He tells her that Bud was right about it being a miserable route. She tells Jim that Mr. Collins appreciates what he did for Bud and Bud can keep the route. Cheerio Meredith as Old Lady.
25	25	"No Partiality"	William D. Russell	Story by : Cally Curtis & Virginia Lindsey; Teleplay by : John Kohn, Alan Woods & Roswell Rogers	March 20, 1955
Kathy is upset because all she seems to get are hand-me-downs. Jim and Margaret decide to treat her with more equality in privileges. Betty is excited because she got a call from a boy that she's interested in. She asks Margaret if she can invite him over for dinner. Kathy insists on being able to invite a boy over as well. Because she's too shy, Kathy has Jim call and invite Howard Williams over. It turns out that was the boy Betty was inviting. Kathy knows him because he's the playground supervisor at her school. Betty gets further upset when Kathy wears her sweater. Jim tries to talk Kathy into inviting someone her own age, but it doesn't work. That evening, Howard shows up and both girls battle for his attention. Kathy starts crying when Betty and Howard go off together. Betty feels bad and she tells Kathy that she can have Howard for the evening. Betty tells Kathy to tell Howard that she has a headache. Howard spends time with Kathy, but keeps asking about Betty. When Kathy's friend Jimmy Wood (Bobby Diamond) comes to the house, Kathy gets Betty to spend the rest of the evening with Howard. Margaret finds out that Jim invited Jimmy over.
26	26	"Close Decision"	William D. Russell	Roswell Rogers	March 27, 1955
Margaret is upset that Bud has not been doing his chores lately. He is also supposed to memorize a poem for church, which he has barely started to do. Bud wants to go play in a baseball game, but Margaret puts her foot down and says he must rake the leaves first. Margaret and Jim catch Bud trying to sneak away to play in the game. Bud tries to tell Jim how important this game is. Margaret then has Betty help Bud learn the poem, but that doesn't go well. Bud's friend Joe comes by and tells him he's holding up the game. Margaret will still not let Bud go. Jim goes by the game and Rev. Swain tells him the boys are losing. Jim tries to explain why they wouldn't let Bud play. But something Rev. Swain says convinces Jim to go get Bud. Jim tells Bud to go play and Margaret is not happy about it. Later, Bud comes home from the game and it appears he was in a fight. The only thing that Jim could find out was that Bud's team lost. The next day the family is at church. Bud starts to recite his poem, but doesn't know it all. He apologizes and says he was playing baseball instead of learning the poem. Rev. Swain explains what happened at the game and why there was a fight. Bud's team almost wins, but in the final play of the game there is a question of whether Bud tagged the player out at home. Admitting he didn't tag the player costs them the game, but he gains the respect of many for telling the truth.

=== Season 2 (1955–56) ===
No. overall	No. in season	Title	Directed by	Written by	Original release date
27	1	"Art of Salesmanship"	William D. Russell	Story by : Roswell Rogers & Paul West, Teleplay by : Roswell Rogers	August 31, 1955
Jim and his friend Howard "Mac" McGrath (Ralph Dumke) are trying to write a sketch for their club's show. Mac tells Jim that he's lucky to have Bud to follow in his footsteps. Jim thinks that Bud has the drive to be a great salesman one day. But then the two see Bud loafing when he should be mowing the lawn. A large box of plastic gravy boats is delivered to the house. Jim is excited to learn that Bud wants to go into business selling them. Margaret thinks Bud should send them back. Bud soon learns there is more to selling than just asking people to buy. Jim tries to give Bud some selling tips, but Bud doesn't think he has what it takes. Bud tries his selling technique on Margaret but things don't go well. Jim gives Bud a sales quota and tells Bud to not let him down. Bud is having no luck selling and Jim is having no luck coming up with a funny idea for the sketch. When Jim tells Mac that he just doesn't have the talent for writing, it dawns on him how Bud feels. Jim learns that Bud is working at a drive in to earn money that he can pass off as money he got selling the gravy boats. Jim realizes he's pushing Bud too hard to be the salesman that he is. He goes to the drive in and makes Bud feel better.
28	2	"Father's Private Life"	William D. Russell	Roswell Rogers	September 7, 1955
Jim comes home early from work because he's exhausted. He tries to rest on the couch when all three children come to him and want his attention about something. Margaret tells Jim that he needs to say no once in a while. He decides that the children need to start finding their own solutions, so he can have some time to himself. Jim tries to work on his Hi-Fi set but everybody looks over his shoulder. Meanwhile, Kathy and her friend Patty have taken a cardboard cutout of a Zulu warrior from a movie theater. Kathy has named him Floyd and leaves him with Jim. Kathy hears from Patty that the manager from the theater is asking around if anyone saw who took his cutout. Kathy is now afraid she'll get in big trouble and wants to get Floyd, but Margaret will not let her into the room where Jim is working. Margaret puts Floyd out by the garbage and Kathy is afraid everyone will see him. That night, Kathy asks Bud to go and hide Floyd. In the morning, Betty finds a note from Kathy that says she's going to hide out somewhere because she stole Floyd. Jim finds her hiding by the garage. Jim has a change of heart and decides he would rather have the children share their problems with him.
29	3	"Lessons in Civics"	William D. Russell	Story by : Ed James, Teleplay by : Dorothy Cooper	September 14, 1955
The town is undergoing new construction, and when Jim learns the old meeting hall is being torn down, he is upset. It is a memorial for the town since it has so much history and Jim is going to try and stop it from being destroyed. Margaret takes the children to the hall and tells them of some of her and Jim's memories of the place. Bud asks F. W. Burns (Lane Bradford), the foreman of the construction company, when the hall will be torn down. Bud is told the building comes down the next day. Betty asks Billy, Mayor Mitchell's son, if he could convince his father not to tear down the hall. When Billy says that he couldn't, Betty storms off. Margaret calls many members of the PTA about the hall. Jim comes home and says that the Mayor would like to talk to him. Jim thinks word got around that the hall shouldn't be torn down. It turns out that Kathy wrote a letter to Mayor Mitchell and repeated some unkind things Jim said about him. Kathy wants to run away from home and Jim has a talk with her. The family goes to see the Mayor to apologize. Jim is volunteered by the Mayor and the Council into helping plan a new park where the building can be moved to.
30	4	"First Disillusionment"	William D. Russell	Roswell Rogers	September 21, 1955
Bud wants to apply for a job in a sports department at a local store. His resume has some embellishments, but Jim tells him to only tell the truth. Bud goes to see Mr. Stagg with his application. He does not get the job because his friend Eddie Wardlow (Peter Miles) embellished his resume and was hired. Bud is now upset with Jim, because honesty got him nowhere. A disillusioned Bud even tells Betty it is OK to cheat on a paper she has to write for school. Bud and his friend Joe Phillips want to come up with a way to get Eddie fired. They decide to write a letter to Mr. Stagg saying Eddie is a crook. Margaret senses that the boys are up to something and she takes the letter out of the mailbox. She shows the letter to Jim. Jim tells Margaret that Eddie actually got fired because he is impossible to work with. Jim wants Bud to think that the letter was mailed and see how Bud reacts when he learns Eddie was fired. Jim thinks that Bud's conscience will not let him take the job. Bud goes to see Mr. Stagg, who tells Bud that the store found out that Eddie lied on his resume. Mr. Stagg tells Bud that if Eddie could be deceitful with that, he could be deceitful with other things. Bud also learns that Mr. Stagg has not received the letter yet and he regrets mailing it. That night, Bud confesses to Jim about the letter and how bad he feels about sending it. Jim hands Bud the letter and tells Bud that he has learned a lesson and is wiser for it.
31	5	"Woman in the House"	William D. Russell	Roswell Rogers	September 28, 1955
Virge Carlson (Harry Hickox), an old friend of Jim's, visits him at work and announces he and his wife Jill (Mary Webster) have moved to Springfield. Jim & Margaret invite the couple to dinner. While Virge is pleasant and well mannered, his wife is an obnoxious free spirit. Kathy comes into the room and is frightened off by Jill. After the couple leave, Margaret mentions how she felt that Jill was making fun of her all evening. Virge has to leave town for a few days and he asks Jim if Jill could stay at his place. Bud and Jill are playing catch and Jill gets hit in the head with the ball. Betty thinks that Margaret is running herself ragged catering to Jill. Virge calls and says he will be away for a couple more days yet. Jim knows that Jill is driving Margaret crazy and suggests sending her to a hotel. Margaret says Jill is their guest and they will put up with her. When Kathy tells Jill that she has a lot of friends, Jill says that she has a hard time making friends. Kathy says that she will be Jill's friend and Jill starts to cry. Kathy tells Margaret that Jill cannot easily make friends. Margaret has a change of heart and makes Jill feel more welcome.
32	6	"New Girl at School"	William D. Russell	Roswell Rogers	October 5, 1955
Jim sees Bud and his friend Joe watching a pretty blonde girl walk by. Kathy brings over her new friend Grover Adams (Richard Eyer) and introduces him to Jim and Margaret. Bud finds out from Grover that he has an older sister named April. Bud is at the shoe repair shop when April comes in. He has a short and awkward conversation with her. Later, Bud has a talk with Jim about how he feels he made a bad impression on April. Grover tells Bud that April said Bud was cute. At school, Bud gets embarrassed when the teacher (Anne Barton) catches him writing a love poem about April. And to make matters worse, April is sitting right in front of Bud. Bud tells Jim what happened in school and wonders how he can make it up to April. April asks Bud if he would help her study for English class that evening. Something Betty says makes Jim and Margaret realize that April is just using Bud. Margaret wants to tell April off, but Jim says that Bud has to learn for himself what April is like. Bud does find out he's being used and he tells off April.
33	7	"Kathy Makes Magic"	William D. Russell	Story by : Herman Epstein & Roswell Rogers, Teleplay by : Roswell Rogers	October 12, 1955
Bud's friend Joe has swiped a couple cigars from his dad. Before they can light up, Kathy comes by with a magic wand and they hide the cigars. The boys and Kathy get into an argument. She waves her wand and says she hopes they get sick and die. Kathy then tries to turn her kitten into a rabbit, but it doesn't work. She tells Jim she traded her skates for Patty's magic set and she thinks she got cheated. Kathy then sees a bird where her kitten used to be and believes she changed it. Kathy tells Betty not to mess with her or she will make sure Betty gets a hit in the head. Just then a paper boy tosses a newspaper and it hits Betty in the head. After smoking the cigars, Bud comes in the house not looking very well. When Kathy hears about Bud, she thinks he is sick because she put a magic curse on him. After she finds out that Joe is also sick, Kathy believes it is her fault even more. Dr. Conrad (Harry Antrim) comes by to check on Bud. Questions are answered when Jim finds the cigar butts. Jim shows the cigar butts to Dr. Conrad and Margaret. Kathy's kitten comes back and she believes all her bad magic is over.
34	8	"Advantage to Betty"	William D. Russell	Roswell Rogers	October 19, 1955
Hal Berdahl (Charles Tannen), a newspaper reporter, takes pictures and writes an article for the paper on the girls' tennis team. The picture used is of Betty, the least talented member of the team, and it looks like she is a champion player. Betty tells teammate Eula Craig that her picture should have been used as she is team captain and a great player. Eula, a plain Jane and a sourpuss, barely speaks to Betty. Back at home Jim and Margaret are proud of Betty, but Bud continually teases her about the picture. Betty and Eula are working with Coach Gabener. Hal comes by again and tells Betty that the sports writers' banquet is Saturday night. He fixed it so Betty will be elected queen of the banquet. Eula walks off mad. Hal wants more pictures of Betty and she tries to tell him to take pictures of Eula. Coach Gabener tells Betty and Eula that they are not playing well together and he has Dotty take Betty's place. Betty thinks she will be dropped from the team. Knowing that Betty believes she does not deserve to go to the banquet, Jim says it is too bad that Eula could not go instead. Betty calls Hal and tells him she doesn't feel well and will not be able to make the banquet. Eula should go in her place. Betty then calls Eula, but she is not interested in going. An angry Betty now says she is going. After speaking with Coach Gabener, Jim decides to talk to Eula. It was not easy, but Jim helps the girls to become friends and Betty lends Eula a gown to wear to the banquet.
35	9	"The Big Test"	William D. Russell	Roswell Rogers	October 26, 1955
Bud tells Jim that he wants to buy an outboard motor. Kathy shows Jim her report card with all the A's she got. Betty also got a very good report card. Bud grades are not as good. Jim tells Bud that if he brings his D grade in science up to a B, Jim will help him buy the motor. Margaret doesn't think that bribing Bud that way is a good idea. Bud studies a lot for a paper he has to write about an experiment for science class. For once, he knows the material and does very well on the paper. Since this is a change from his previous work, the teacher, Mr. Glover, assumes he must have cheated. Because of this, Mr. Glover only gives Bud a C grade. An even more important test is coming up. One day, Bud asks Mr. Glover if he can stay after class and look over some of Mr. Glover's books. Bud knocks over some papers and picks them up. Mr. Glover comes back in the room catches him with the answers to the test. Through a series of events, the family finds out that Bud may have seen the test questions ahead of time. Before the test, Betty tells Bud that he is suspected of seeing the answers and he better do poorly on the test to prove everyone wrong. Bud gets an almost perfect paper. Mr. Glover, Jim and Margaret confront Bud about the paper. Bud says he didn't look at the test answers, he did well because he studied. Jim finds a way to prove Bud didn't cheat.
36	10	"Father is a Dope"	William D. Russell	Roswell Rogers	November 2, 1955
The family watches a sitcom on television. Jim thinks the father is portrayed as an idiot who needs his wife to always save the day. The next day, Jim's friend Ed Davis (Robert Foulk) suggests the two go duck hunting tomorrow. Margaret says Jim should go, but in a way that makes Jim think she doesn't really want him to go. Betty tells Jim she has a job interview the next day and would like him to go with for support. Kathy tells a friend she cannot go to her party because Jim will not be around to drive her. Bud has a sharp pain in his chest. Jim tells Ed he believes all these things were staged by Margaret. Jim wonders what she'll do next. Just as he says this Margaret crashes the car into their fence. The next day, Ed is waiting at the Anderson house while Jim has the car fender looked at. Margaret tells Ed that she's sure Jim thinks that she did it on purpose, but she says she didn't. Jim comes back and Ed starts to load up the car. Jim thinks that Bud and Betty are still trying to get him to stay home. As they are leaving, Jim backs his car into Dr. Conrad's. While Ed tries to unlock the car bumpers, Jim goes to see what Dr. Conrad has to say about Bud. It turns out Bud really is sick. Jim decides to stay home and help each of the children with their problems.
37	11	"The Spirit of Youth"	William D. Russell	Dorothy Cooper	November 9, 1955
Bud makes a comment about Jim's age. Jim receives a special delivery letter from his college alumni association. There's a class reunion this coming weekend. Bud tells Kathy and Betty that they need to more considerate to Jim because he's getting older every day. The girls start acting as though Margaret was old. Later that night, Margaret tells Jim that she's afraid they are getting old. She would like to go to the class reunion and see some young people. Jim reluctantly agrees to go. At the college, student Bob (Steve Terrell) shows Jim where he'll be sleeping. Bob keeps talking loudly as he thinks Jim is hard of hearing because of his age. Margaret attends a sorority meeting. That night, Jim and Margaret reminisce about their college days. They realize that while they are not old, they are not teenagers and are glad of it. It is three o'clock in the morning and Jim cannot sleep. Margaret is staying at the sorority house. Jim stands under her window and serenades her by singing Juanita. The next night at the dance, Margaret and Jim decide to leave early and head home. Kathryn Grant as Maxine.
38	12	"Bud, the Ladykiller"	William D. Russell	Sumner Arthur Long & Dorothy Cooper	November 16, 1955
A classmate named Dora Fenway calls Bud because she has quite a crush on him. He doesn't want to talk to her and is very rude. At school, Joe and Claude tease Bud about Dora and Bud gets mad. Dora comes by the house to return a book of Bud's. Jim invites her in and she meets the family. Bud is very rude and insulting and Dora leaves crying. Jim is quite upset with Bud and tells him he needs to apologize to Dora. Bud tries, but Dora does not accept his apology and tells him off. Jim still thinks that Bud needs to do something to make Dora feel better. Betty suggests asking her to the junior prom. Bud reluctantly agrees to do it. At Dora's house, Bud awkwardly asks her to the prom. She accepts and gives him a kiss. Afraid that Bud will now be leading her on, Jim suggests finding another boy to be interested in Dora. In school, Bud talks her up to all his friends. Dora talks to Jim and Margaret and says she knows that Bud doesn't really want to take her to the prom. She says that Bud is just being a gentleman and doesn't want to hurt her feelings. Dora is thankful for Bud getting people at school to start liking her. Bud comes by and says he does want to take her because he got to know her better and likes her. Dora tells Bud that she's going to the prom with a bookish boy named Horace. The two have a lot in common. Bud now knows what it is like to be rejected.
39	13	"Margaret's Premonition"	William D. Russell	Roswell Rogers	November 30, 1955
Margaret has been thinking about her Aunt Matty all day. Aunt Matty calls and tells Margaret that Uncle Ira got into a small accident with his rocker. Betty tells Margaret that it was a premonition about Matty, but Margaret says it was just a coincidence. Jim tells Margaret that he needs to go out of town on Wednesday night for an insurance deal. Margaret gets a funny feeling. The next day she tells Myrtle Davis (Vivi Janiss) that she feels Jim shouldn't go on the trip. Myrtle says the maybe Margaret could get Jim to make the trip on Thursday. Margaret tells her she just thought the same thing. When Margaret brings it up to Jim, he teases her about her premonitions. She keeps trying to find reasons for Jim to not make the trip, but he insists on going. Margaret then wants to go with on the trip but Jim says no. Jim asks Ed Davis if he believes in premonitions and Ed says he doesn't. Jim is about to leave for the trip. Margaret goes behind his back and has the meeting postponed. Jim finds out what Margaret did and is not happy. But then he finds out the road and a bridge that he was going use was washed out in a storm and it is a good thing he did not go.
40	14	"Stage to Yuma"	William D. Russell	Story by : Marvin De Vries, Teleplay by : D.D. Beauchamp	December 7, 1955
Robert Young plays the role of Tate Ibsen, one of the passengers riding a stagecoach through Arizona in the year 1860. One passenger named Duece (Rayford Barnes) has been convicted of murder and is handcuffed to deputy Watts (Robert Griffin). School teacher Miss Quimby (Sarah Selby) asks Duece what he did and Duece claims he's innocent. Miss Quimby has a little boy named Porfio with her. Major Alden (Lester Matthews), who is drinking a lot, says he's locating to a new place. Tate says he's headed to Yuma Penitentiary to break a friend out. Tate sees an Indian and tells Boggs (Harry Hickox), the driver, to stop. Boggs wants to keep going and then is hit with an arrow. Tate tells Watts to let Duece free so he can help fight off an attack. Alden wants to know if Tate is just doing this because he's on the stage to free Duece. Tate admits that Duece is a friend of his. With Alden's help, Tate gets Watts' gun and then frees Duece. When another arrow hits the coach's door, everyone believes there really are Indians. Watts goes outside and is hit with an arrow. Alden and Miss Quimby don't really trust Tate. To draw the Indians down from the cliffs, Alden leaves the coach and sacrifices himself. The Indians start to attack and Duece, Tate and Porfio begin shooting at them. An Indian opens the stage door and is about to kill Miss Quimby when Tate shoots him. The two remaining Indians leave but Duece was hit with an arrow. Tate gets Miss Quimby and Porfio to the two horses and then goes after the Indians. Miss Quimby thinks Tate is using her and the boy as bait. Tate has one bullet left and kills one of the Indians. Tate signals Porfio and Miss Quimby to ride off to safety. Tate manages to frighten off the last Indian. Note: Robert Young opens the show by saying... "For tonight only, while the family's on vacation, we have the opportunity to present a special program. It is a dramatic story set in Arizona in the year 1860. In a few seconds, when again we meet, I'll be one of five passengers riding the stage to Yuma, which happens to be the title of our story."
41	15	"Bad Influence"	William D. Russell	Story by : Herman J. Epstein, Teleplay by : Roswell Rogers	December 14, 1955
Bud tells Jim that he wants to get a frogman outfit, but he doesn't have enough money. He also brings up his new friend Arty Merrill. Margaret is concerned about all the gifts that Arty is giving Bud. After Arty gives Bud a new hat, Margaret mentions to Jim that a friend of hers thinks that Arty is stealing the stuff. She thinks they should have Bud stop seeing Arty, but Jim thinks she's jumping to conclusions. Betty buys a new camera with some money that Bud owed her. Arty offers to lend Bud the money he needs for the outfit. Bud finds out that Arty took the money from Kathy's piggy bank. Before Bud can put the money back in the bank, Margaret comes in the room. Bud lets her think that he took the money. Jim talks to Bud and Bud is willing to be punished. Bud also tells Jim that he will not see Arty any more. Jim has a different plan and tells Bud to invite Arty to the baseball game that Jim was going to take Bud to. Before they leave for the game, Arty takes Betty's camera. The next day, Arty brings Bud some frogman equipment. Jim catches Bud wearing the equipment and asks him where he got the money for it, but Bud does not have an answer. Betty then asks where her camera is. Jim now believes that Bud stole the camera and gets upset. When Arty sees how Bud stuck his neck out for him, Arty admits to it all. Jim tells him that he should not try to buy someone's friendship. Jim then says the family still wants him as a friend.
42	16	"Betty Hates Carter"	William D. Russell	Roswell Rogers	December 28, 1955
Jim is rehearsing a speech for the upcoming Insurance Underwriters convention. Jim tells Margaret that Ward and Evelyn Mawson will be in town for the convention. Betty is horrified when Jim sets her up on a blind date with Carter Mawson (Robert Easton), the Mawson's son. Jim tells her that he invited Carter over for dinner that night. When Betty meets Carter, she thinks he's quite unattractive. She tells him that she knows they were thrown together and he's free to break the upcoming date. They have a short conversation and Carter turns out to be intelligent and agrees with much of what Betty has to say. Carter doesn't stay for dinner. The next day, Carter comes by because he left a letter there. While not letting on, Betty does start to take an interest in Carter. Betty's friend Janie Little (Cindy Robbins) comes by to borrow a fur piece and meets Carter. After she leaves, Carter mentions that Janie is good looking. Betty suggests that Carter take Janie to the convention dance. Betty calls Janie and Janie reluctantly agrees to go out with Carter. Betty is starting to like Carter even more, but still does not say anything. It is the night of the dance. The doorbell rings and Betty hopes it is Carter, but it is Janie. Janie thinks that Betty just pawned Carter off on her and is not sure about the date. Betty says that Carter wants to go with her and she should get home. Jim talks to Janie. Janie realizes how much Betty really likes Carter, so she tells him she is sick and that he should take Betty. Joseph Mell as Dave.
43	17	"Jim, the Tyrant"	William D. Russell	Story by : Herman Epstein, Teleplay by : Herman Epstein & Roswell Rogers	January 4, 1956
Jim comes home after a very bad day at work. Wanting to tell the family about his day, he is miffed when they ignore him. He starts complaining about everyone and everything around the house. The family doesn't understand why Jim is so irritable. During dinner, they get a call that Kathy's baby sitter cannot make it. Everyone else has plans for the evening. Jim then lectures the family about their only thinking of themselves. Jim says that if he has to be a tyrant to keep the family in line, he will be. The next day, Kathy looks up what a tyrant is. Bud is going to play baseball. When Bud will not let Kathy tag along, she throws the baseball away and breaks a window. Later, Kathy spills a bottle of Betty's perfume. Jim comes home claiming to have had a great day at the office. He is told what Kathy did and goes to have a talk with her. Kathy fantasizes that Tyrant Father finds her guilty of her crimes and Executioner Bud is to take over. Jim walks into the room and finds Kathy under the bed. She is so afraid of what Jim will do. Jim has Margaret talk to Kathy. She finds that Kathy is afraid of Jim because he says he's a tyrant. Jim apologizes for using the word tyrant and Kathy says that no one wants her around because she's little. The two talk some more and Jim learns a lesson about himself.
44	18	"Betty's Brother"	William D. Russell	Story by : Herman Epstein, Teleplay by : Paul West	January 11, 1956
Kathy is proud of her big sister Betty and is making a scrapbook about her. Bud has to always follow in Betty's footsteps at school and he finds it hard to do. Betty announces that she will be on TV representing her school on a panel show. Bud shows Jim a note from school saying he's falling behind in his work. Bud has also cut one of his classes and has gotten into fights. Jim asks Mr. Armstead (Sam Flint), the principal, to come to the house and talk to Bud. Bud cannot explain to Jim and Mr. Armstead what's bothering him. Later, Bud tells Jim and Margaret that he will work harder at school. In class, one of the guys calls Bud "Betty Anderson, Jr." and Bud starts fighting him. Miss Woodruff (Claudia Bryar), Bud's teacher, sends him to the Principal's office. At home, Margaret suggests that Bud may have lost his confidence trying to be as good as Betty is in school. Betty asks Bud to take her place on the TV show. She makes up a story that she has too much studying to do. Bud thinks he'll just mess things up and doesn't want to do it. After the family talks to him, Bud reluctantly agrees to go on the show. On the show, moderator Mr. Clark (S. John Launer) introduces the five students. Despite being nervous at first, Bud does quite well. Yvonne Lime as Dorothy Snow.
45	19	"Betty Earns a Formal"	William D. Russell	Paul West	January 18, 1956
It seems like only bills are coming in the mail, and everyone is asking Jim for money. Betty asks for money to buy a dress for a country club dance. At first Jim says OK, but when he hears how expensive it is, Jim tells Betty to earn the money herself. Jim is talking with Hal Fredericks (Grandon Rhodes), whose son is taking Betty to the dance. After Hal talks about his daughter, who just got married and moved away, Jim has a change of heart about the dress. Jim tells Betty that he'll buy the dress, but Betty says she already has a job and she'll buy the dress herself. Betty gives no information where her job is as she doesn't want family hanging around. It has been over a week and the family still doesn't know where Betty is working. Betty is sleeping at her desk and Bud finds a paycheck of hers. He finds out where she is working but doesn't tell anyone. Jim has a dream that Betty has a job as a saloon dancer and she didn't know it would be that kind of job. She begs for her father to help her, but Jim cannot get to her. The next day, Betty accidentally lets her parents see part of her work clothes and she runs to her room. Jim thinks it looks like a Burlesque outfit. Just then Bud walks in and says he has a job, but he will not tell his parents where. Jim finds out that Bud and Betty are working at the same place and it is a food market. Bud is a stock boy and Betty is giving away peach samples. With a little help from Jim, Betty earns enough to buy her dress. Claire Carleton as Hostess.
46	20	"The House Painter"	William D. Russell	Roswell Rogers	January 26, 1956
The Andersons hire Mr. Everett (Parker Fennelly) to paint the house. Betty tells her parents that at school they discussed how most people do things out of selfishness. Margaret agrees. Jim believes that someone does something for the sense of accomplishment and integrity. Jim and Margaret make a bet to see who is right. If Margaret wins, Jim has to buy her a car. Jim then asks Mr. Everett to use cheap paint on the house, knowing his integrity would not let him do it. Jim is surprised and disappointed when Everett says OK. Jim thinks that Everett will change his mind and asks Margaret to wait until tomorrow afternoon to see what happens. The next morning Jim tells Everett that if there's anything he wants to talk about, he can reach him at the office. Everett mentions to himself that he didn't think Jim would be that cheap. Bud is told to clean his room, but he had other plans. While sanding Bud's bedroom window, Everett sees Bud trying to hide garbage under his bed. He talks to Bud about doing a job right. Everett starts to paint and thinking he's using the cheap paint, Margaret tells him to stop. From the office, Jim tells Margaret that if Everett will not stop then he's fired. Jim learns from the paint company that Everett bought the best they had. Everett comes by and tells off Jim for being cheap and setting a bad example. Jim tells Everett about the bet and then is surprised by something Everett says.
47	21	"Bud, the Wallflower"	William D. Russell	Paul West	February 1, 1956
Betty is chairman of the Planning Committee for the high school dance and needs to come up with an idea for its theme. Margaret suggests a Sadie Hawkins dance. At school, Bud, Claude and Kippy claim girls have asked them, but in reality no one has. They pretend to not be interested in going to the dance. The three decide to plan a camping trip the same day as the dance as a way to show they don't care. First Kippy and then Claude back out on the trip as they are asked to the dance. Now, Bud feels worse than ever. To try and cheer Bud up, Jim decides to go camping with him. Betty's friend Dottie tells her that she knows for sure that Bud has been asked. Betty realizes that there's been a mix-up somewhere. Classmate Wanda comes to the house. She asks Jim and Margaret if Bud had anything to tell her. It turns out Wanda gave Kathy a note asking Bud to the dance, but Kathy forgot to give it to him. Kathy sees Wanda, remembers about the note and gives it to Bud. Bud tells Wanda he'd love to go to the dance with her.
48	22	"The Bus to Nowhere"	William D. Russell	Roswell Rogers	February 8, 1956
Betty is depressed, moody and finds everyday events dull. She is not sure what she is looking for. Betty hears Bud read a paper he's written about a bus that goes nowhere. The next morning Dottie comes by and tells Margaret about an old fashioned hayride that some of the kids are setting up. She mentions to Margaret that Betty hasn't been herself lately. It is almost dinner time and Betty says she's going to the bus station, but no one pays attention. At the bus station Betty decides to take a trip to wherever nine dollars will get her. She's a little unsure of herself and starts to hear voices. Betty sees an old man (John Qualen) who doesn't know he has gotten off at the wrong stop and he's lost and confused. Back at home, the family realizes that Betty is not there. The old man asks Betty for help and she learns he's at the wrong station. It is announced that her bus is boarding, but she decides to help the old man. Betty gives him some money to buy a ticket and takes him to the bus. Jim arrives and asks the clerk about Betty. The old man thanks Betty, gives her a gift and a kiss and boards the bus. Jim finds Betty and she tells him that everything is all right and she feels whole again. Kathleen Freeman as Fussy Woman.
49	23	"Kathy, the Indian Giver"	William D. Russell	Kay Lenard	February 15, 1956
Bud reluctantly agrees to trade a small paint brush of his for Kathy's cap. When Kathy see a pretty cap of Betty's, she wants to trade back for her cap. Bud refuses and Jim tells her that both sides have to agree in a trade. Kathy sees her friend Susie, who complains about having to always watch her baby sister Debbie. Susie agrees to trade Debbie for Kathy's baby doll. Kathy brings Debbie home and tries to hide her. The family hears Debbie crying and finds Kathy and the baby. Jim tries to explain to Kathy that one cannot trade human beings, but she doesn't understand. Jim tries to talk to Kathy again, but she's locked herself in her room. Jim tells Bud and Betty that this is partly their fault as they always ignore Kathy. Bud and Betty try to make Kathy feel better, but she says all she wants is her baby. The family comes up with a plan to make Kathy think they traded Bud for his friend Claude Messner. The next morning Claude is at the table when Kathy walks in. The family is disappointed when it doesn't seem to faze Kathy. In the end, Kathy realizes she was being stubborn and apologizes. Lois January as Mrs. Martin.
50	24	"The Historical Andersons"	William D. Russell	Story by : Herman Epstein & Roswell Rogers, Teleplay by : Roswell Rogers	February 22, 1956
Bud has to write a paper on a historical figure from the Revolutionary War. Jim suggests an ancestor, Major Nathaniel Anderson, and says he must be important if he was a major. Bud finds a picture of Nathaniel in the attic and Bud thinks the Major looks like him. Bud fantasizes that he is Nathaniel. Bud tells everyone at school about the famous relative, but many don't believe him. Miss Woodruff, Bud's teacher, would like him to read his paper at the Friday night PTA meeting. Bud and Betty research Nathaniel at the public library. What they find out isn't good. Miss Woodruff comes by the house and says how excited the PTA is about the Major. They're having a scroll made and would like the Anderson family to act out some scenes depicting the Major's triumphs. It is the night of the PTA meeting and Miss Woodruff introduces Jim. Jim tells the story, and the family acts out, of how Nathaniel stole tea from the Boston Tea Party and sold it on the Black market. Nathaniel was eventually tar and feathered and chased out of Boston. He was later jailed and also faked being a Major. Jim tells the audience that he felt it was best that the truth came out. Elizabeth Harrower as Librarian.
51	25	"The Grass is Greener"	William D. Russell	Story by : Herman Epstein, Teleplay by : Dorothy Cooper	February 29, 1956
Jim is excited to tell his family that his college friend Charlie Bradley (Frank Wilcox) is being interviewed on television. Jim tells them that Charlie is quite successful. Jim and Charlie were part of a college group called "The Four Musketeers". Charlie calls Jim and agrees to come over for dinner on Wednesday. Jim mentions to the family that the other two men are also quite successful. Kathy then says that Jim is the only one who isn't. The next day at work, Mr. Gribble (Paul Harvey) comes to Jim's office. Something Mr. Gribble requests of Jim makes him feel unsuccessful. Wanting to help his father, Bud leaves a book titled "How to be a Success in Business" out for him to find. Mr. Gribble would like Jim to get Charlie to represent Springfield at the State convention. The kids try and show an interest in Jim's job, but it just makes him upset. Margaret makes Jim feel better. Charlie calls and says he cannot make dinner, he does however accept going to the convention. Charlie does come by the house before he has to catch a flight and tells Jim what a wonderful life he must have. In the end, Jim realizes he has everything he wants.
52	26	"The Persistent Guest"	William D. Russell	Paul West	March 7, 1956
Bud meets Fred Wyman (Barry Truex) in the school cafeteria. They decide Fred will help tutor Bud in Algebra, while Bud will help him with English. Bud invites Fred over to the house. That evening, Jim mentions to Margaret how his friend Lou Miller (Ray Walker) would give anything to have a boy like Bud. They are sitting down to dinner and Fred shows up. Things are awkward for a moment, but then the family invites Fred to eat with them. Fred loads up his plate with food and later he insists on doing the dishes. It is getting very late and Jim says that Fred can stay over, but he should call his parents. Fred stalls a bit but then he fakes calling home. The family wakes up the next morning to find that Fred has made breakfast. Betty's friend Alice comes by and sees Fred. She rudely tells the family that Fred sponges off of people, that he is a bum and that he lives in the back of a junk yard. Fred tells the family that his parents separated. He doesn't know where his mother is and his father just left a few months back. Jim introduces Fred to Lou and Grace (Virginia Christine) Miller. The Millers instantly know that Fred is the boy for them.
53	27	"Family Reunion"	William D. Russell	Roswell Rogers	March 14, 1956
Margaret gets a letter from her sister Esther about a family reunion the next day. Even though it is extremely out of the way, Esther asks them to pick up Cousin Ione (Lillian Powell). While Margaret is excited, Jim and the children are not. They all start to make excuses to not go. When Margaret isn't around the family does imitations of the relatives. Margaret walks into the room, hears them and then tells them off. An irritated Margaret says they will not go. Ione calls and says she'll be in town the next day so they will not have to drive out to pick her up. The next day, Jim wants the family to come up with a way to make Margaret happy and decide to go. Cousin Ione comes by the house. Jim tries to talk to Margaret but she says she's going shopping with Myrtle Davis. Margaret talks to Ione, but doesn't say anything about not going. Jim and Margaret have a heart to heart talk and she agrees to go.
54	28	"Family Dines Out"	William D. Russell	Story by : Herman Epstein & Roswell Rogers, Teleplay by : Dorothy Cooper	March 28, 1956
Betty pulls up to the house in a chauffeur driven limousine. It is owned by her new friend Eloise Sanford's family. Betty promised Eloise that her family will attend the opening of the new Country Club. Jim is not interested in going because he thinks Betty just wants to show off. After realizing Betty is in a bind, Jim agrees to go. Jim and Margaret are getting dressed for the evening and Bud comes by saying he got a new job. Bud needs the family to eat at the modest drugstore counter that night. In order to get the job, Bud promised Pete the manager that he'd increase business. Jim tells him that they already agreed to go to the Country Club. At the drugstore, Pete says Bud's friends better show up as he ordered extra food. Bud is excited when he sees his family does show up. Betty is embarrassed when she sees Eloise come into the drugstore. Eloise says she thinks it is very nice that the family wanted to help Bud. She says that her father invited them to the club for the next evening. Jim tells Betty that instead of being a snob, she should be proud of Bud starting at the bottom. Bud tells the family he's just been fired.
55	29	"Bud, the Boxer"	William D. Russell	Story by : Ben Gershman & Paul West, Teleplay by : Paul West	April 4, 1956
Bud tries to avoid Eddie Jarvis, a bully at school, but Jim tells Bud he cannot avoid his problems forever. Jim suggests the boys get in a boxing ring and have a clean fight. Bud loses the fight. When he gets home, Bud tells the family he got punched in the nose and just stayed on the floor. Jim talks Bud into taking some boxing lessons with Coach Bill Neuman (Joseph Cranston). Jim says it will give Bud confidence. Margaret and Betty think it is a bad idea, but Jim says Bud is not going to turn into a fighter. Bud comes from a lesson and says he had a great time and that Bill said he was a fast learner. Jim comes by one of the lessons. Bud fights Eddie again and this time he wins. At home, Jim brags to Margaret how well Bud did. Bud comes home and tells how great all the guys thought he was. Bud starts to get a big head and wants to take on the high school junior class champion. The night of the fight Bud does not do so well and loses. Jim tells Bud that he is still proud of him.
56	30	"Betty, Girl Engineer"	William D. Russell	Roswell Rogers	April 11, 1956
Betty's school hosts a career day where the students can sign up to intern at a job. Betty comes home and tells the family she signed up for a civil engineer position. Margaret is surprised that they would take a girl. Betty says they don't know she's a girl as she signed with her initials, BJ. Jim thinks that after a day or so, Betty will give it up. On her first day, she meets Doyle Hobbs (Roger Smith), the head surveyor. Doyle keeps asking Betty what was the reason she signed up to be an engineer. He gives Betty a hard time as he believes a woman's place is in the home. An angry and frustrated Betty leaves the job site. Betty tells Margaret exactly what she thinks of Doyle and it isn't good. Doyle comes by the Anderson house to see Betty. Betty doesn't want to see him. Jim goes to talk to Doyle and Doyle continually mentions how it isn't right for a girl to want to be an engineer. Just as Doyle is leaving, Betty shows up in a new dress. Betty accepts Doyle's request for a date and it seems she has given up the idea of engineering.
57	31	"The Martins and the Coys"	William D. Russell	Paul West	April 18, 1956
Jim has an argument with old friend Frank Tyler (Tris Coffin) about his insurance which was cancelled. Jim and Frank decide they no longer need to contact each other and their friendship is over. However, Betty is dating Frank's son Bob. Bob tells Betty about the fight and says they need to do something. Jim comes home and tells the family his version of the story. Frank tells his wife Dorothy (Ann Doran) and Bob his side of the story. Both men are furious and believe the other to be a cheat. At the malt shop, Betty and Bob reluctantly decide to stop seeing each other. Margaret tells Jim she's worried how this fight will effect Betty. Both father's tell their children that they should keep dating, but Betty and Bob tell their fathers it is not the same. Both families insist that Jim and Frank should make up. The men get together to apologize and get into another fight. Something Bud had told Jim, gets him to work things out with Frank.
58	32	"Dilemma for Margaret"	William D. Russell	Kay Lenard	April 25, 1956
Evelyn (Eilene Janssen) drops off a package for Betty and it has something to do with that evening. Margaret is picked to give a speech on child guidance at a PTA seminar. Jim tells her to speak about how well she has raised her children. That night, Betty gets a phone call and then sneaks out of the house with a ghost costume that was in the package. Kathy looks out her window and sees a ghost walking by. She tells her parents and they go outside to look around. A policeman comes by and tells them the high school was vandalized by a bunch of people dressed as ghosts. Bud and Kathy see Betty come home and put the costume in the garbage. The next morning there is an article in the paper about the incident. There was a window broken at the school and the police believe students were involved. Mrs. Tyler (Barbara Woodell) calls Margaret and tells her Principal Armstead (Sam Flint) would like to talk to the PTA committee about what happened. Armstead says that if the guilty party doesn't come forward, all the clubs will be punished. Jim and Margaret find out Betty was involved and Betty says it was supposed to be a club initiation prank. Margaret tells Betty that unless she tells Principal Armstead the truth, she would tell the PTA she couldn't give the speech. Betty initially says she cannot be a tattletale, but then she does the right thing and talks to Armstead.
59	33	"Hero Father"	William D. Russell	Story by : Dorothy Cooper & Herman Epstein, Teleplay by : Dorothy Cooper	May 2, 1956
Baseball star Duke Snider and his All-Stars are touring the country and all the guys are hoping they would stop in Springfield and give an exhibition game. Bud says his father might be able to convince Duke to stop. After Jim gets tickets to a sold out show for Betty, Bud is sure he can get the All-Stars. Jim says there's no way he could get them, but Margaret thinks he should try. Jim manages to get in touch with Snider and finds out he will need to pay the team expenses in advance to get them to come to town for a charity game. They will also want 25% of the profits. Jack Bramer (Kenneth Tobey) is the father of Sandy (Tommy Ivo), one of Bud's friends. Jack comes to see Jim at his office. He offers Jim the money up front that would be needed to get the All-Stars to appear. Jack is doing it partly to earn the respect of his son. But, Jack wants a political favor in return, which Jim refuses to do. Everyone is now disappointed that the game is cancelled. Jim doesn't tell anyone the real reason. When Jack finds out that Jim has taken the blame for the game falling through, he has a change of heart. Jim also did something that brings Jack and Sandy closer together.
60	34	"Father, the Naturalist"	William D. Russell	Roswell Rogers	May 9, 1956
Kathy must complete a nature folder for a school club by that night in order to be promoted to a higher rank the next day. Teacher Mrs. Davies is not happy about Kathy doing it last minute, but she'll allow it. Kathy says she'll drop the folder off to her tonight. Kathy calls Jim and asks him for his help finding the things she needs, but he says he's to busy at work. Kathy still believes he'll come home. Meanwhile, Betty wants Bud to cut a piece of wood for her, but he says he's too busy. Margaret suggests that Betty help Bud with his chores and then he'll have time to cut the wood. Jim does come home early and doesn't want to get involved with Bud and Betty's problem. Jim and Kathy head outside to explore the woods to find the plants she needs. Kathy accidentally leaves the nature folder out in the forest. The two come home and Jim is exhausted. Kathy realizes the folder is missing and Jim remembers where they left it. Margaret says she'll call Mrs. Davies and explain things. Mrs. Davies says the folders have to be turned into the council. Betty is in the basement trying to cut her wood by herself. She is hoping Bud will hear her and help, but he doesn't. It's the middle of the night and a storm is approaching. Worried that Kathy's folder will be ruined, Jim goes to look for it. In the morning, Kathy is thrilled to see her folder. Bud and Betty learn a lesson about helping other people out.
61	35	"The Ten-Dollar Question"	William D. Russell	Story by : Barbara Avedon, Teleplay by : Barbara Avedon & Dorothy Cooper	May 16, 1956
Bud wants some money so he and six of his friends can buy a car. Betty wants some money to take a charm course. Kathy wants a toy rocket ship. The kids are constantly tattling on each other. Jim decides to start an anti-snitching contest. Whoever can go a week without telling on the other will win $10. Jim puts the money in a drawer and days later finds it missing. Then Betty gets a package from the charm school. Jim finds out that Bud's been working on a car. Kathy suddenly has the toy rocket. Jim becomes disappointed when none of the children confess. Then, to make things even more confusing, each of the children tell Jim they took the money to cover for each other. Turns out that Margaret found the money and put it back in Jim's wallet. Wilson Wood as Delivery Man. Frank Sully as Waiter.
62	36	"Adopted Daughter"	William D. Russell	Story by: Roswell Rogers and Carl Herzinger; Teleplay by: Roswell Rogers	May 23, 1956
Patty Davis tells Kathy that fellow classmate Alicia May is adopted. Patty says that one way to prove one was not adopted is by a birth certificate. She asks Kathy if she has seen her certificate. Kathy goes home and searches for the certificate. When Margaret says it was lost, Kathy begins to worry. Kathy asks Jim about her birth and Jim jokes and makes up a story of her being left by the milkman. Kathy tells Patty that she believes she is adopted. Kathy finds a receipt from an adoption agency and is sure it refers to her. Margaret mentions to Jim how strangely Kathy's been acting. Bud starts taking Kathy's stuff out of her room. Jim tries to tell Kathy that it is only for a couple days as they are sanding and varnishing her floor. Believing that the family is going to kick her out, Kathy runs away. She goes to Alicia May's house and tells her she is adopted as well. Alicia May tells Kathy that adopted children are special, because they were chosen. Alicia May convinces her to go back to her family. The family finds out from Patty that Kathy thinks she's adopted. Jim finds Kathy and reassures her she is part of the family.
63	37	"Betty's Graduation"	William D. Russell	Roswell Rogers	May 30, 1956
Kathy doesn't want to graduate from eighth grade because this is the happiest time of her life. Jim tells Kathy a story about Betty's high school graduation. Flashback to Betty practicing her graduation speech. A corsage from Ralph is delivered for Betty and she starts to cry. Jim has a talk with Betty and she seems fine, but he still thinks something is wrong. Kathy finds Margaret's diary and starts to read it to Jim. Margaret takes it away from her. Ralph calls and Betty says that she's not going to the graduation dance that evening. Betty tells her parents that she doesn't want to go as this is the last dance and there will never be another. Betty starts to think the best days of her life are now over and does not want to graduate. Later, the family cannot find Betty. Betty calls and tells Jim she took a cab to an old grove she used to go to when she was younger and wanted to think things through. Jim drives out to see her. With the help of Margaret's diary, Jim convinces Betty that the best things are ahead for her. At the graduation ceremony, Mr. Armstead introduces valedictorian Betty. As part of her speech, she repeats something Jim told her at the grove.

=== Season 3 (1956–57) ===
No. overall	No. in season	Title	Directed by	Written by	Original release date
64	1	"No Apron Strings"	Peter Tewksbury	Roswell Rogers	September 16, 1956
Bud has a new girlfriend named Georgia Amaldi (Denise Alexander), but he hasn't told the family. After school she works at her father's (Frank Puglia) grocery store. Georgia is getting a little upset because it seems every time she wants Bud to be with her, he has to run an errand for his mother. Georgia would like to have Bud take her to the Planetarium this Friday. Bud says no matter what, it is a date. Kathy comes into the store and Bud hides in the back. Kathy says that a friend thought they saw Bud come into the store. Georgia pretends to not know who Bud is. Kathy also mentions that she needs to find a gift for her mother's birthday on Friday. Because he has forgotten about Margaret's birthday, Bud again promises Georgia they will go out on Friday. Back at home, Bud learns about Margaret's birthday party on Friday night. It is Friday night and Georgia thinks Bud is not coming because her family is from "the wrong side of the tracks". Bud tells the family that he has to go as he had made a date before he remembered about the birthday. Margaret is surprised, but tells Bud to go. After he leaves, Mr. Amaldi comes to the house. Bud tells Georgia that he saw her father's truck pull up to his house. Georgia is worried that her father will ruin everything. When her and Bud get to the house, they find the family and her father signing Polly Wolly Doodle and having a great time.
65	2	"Never the Twain"	Peter Tewksbury	Paul West	September 19, 1956
A cowboy named Utah (John Smith), that Betty met on a dude ranch over the past summer, is stopping in Springfield on his way to Chicago. Betty tells her friend Janey that he was everything she ever dreamed about. And she has incredible memories of their time together. Betty shows pictures of the ranch to the family. Flashback to the family arriving at the ranch. Owner Harvey Johnson shows them around. Betty sees Utah for the first time. Betty would like Jim to ask Harvey if Utah could be their guide, but Jim thinks they should just take who they get. The next morning, Betty finds out that elderly Ace (Will Wright) will be their guide. But at the last minute, Utah takes over as Ace has to go into town. Utah tells Betty that Ace really didn't have to go into town, he wanted to make sure he got to ride with her. The week is almost over. Utah tells Betty that the party that night is probably the last time he'll see her. That night, Utah gives Betty a gift and they kiss. Back to the present and Utah arrives at the house. But, when she sees him, he is not the man Betty remembered. They have a very awkward conversation and Utah leaves. Jim explains to her how time can build up an image of someone and she should hold on to those memories. Emil Sitka as Earl.
66	3	"Betty Goes to College"	Peter Tewksbury	Story by : Herman Epstein, Teleplay by : Dorothy Cooper & Roswell Rogers	September 26, 1956
Jim & Margaret are going to take Betty to State University, to look things over. It is the same college that Jim and Margaret went to and they expect Betty to go there as well. But Jim does tell Betty and Bud that they are free to choose any college they want. Betty tells her friend Dottie Snow (Yvonne Lime) that if she does go to State, she'll miss her friends in town. The family arrives at State University and Jim and Margaret really talk it up. Bud is unimpressed. The more that Jim praises the school, the more that Betty is having second thoughts. When Jim tells Drama teacher Mrs. Blair that Betty will be taking all the classes that he did, Betty leaves the room. Jim overhears Betty telling Bud that she doesn't want to go to State. Jim is about to tell Margaret what he heard when Dean Walton (Ray Collins) comes by. Dean Walton is introduced to the children and Margaret mentions how they will all be going to the school eventually. Betty explains to her parents that going to State would be reliving their lives and she wants to live her own life. She wants to stay in town and go to the junior college with her friends. Dean overhears this. Something Dean Walton does helps Jim to understand that Betty needs to make her own choice.
67	4	"Man About Town"	Peter Tewksbury	Dorothy Cooper	October 3, 1956
Bud's friend Kippy has his cousin Marissa (Kathleen Case) coming to town. Kippy shows Bud a picture of her and Bud would really like to go out with her. Marissa arrives and Bud catches a glimpse of her and she is even prettier in real life. Kippy calls Bud and tells him he forgot how old Marissa was. Bud is only 15 and 5'7 but Marissa likes older, taller men. Kippy gives him lifts for his shoes, powder to put in his hair and a fake mustache. Bud talks to Marissa over the phone and she would like to go to the Top Hat night club. Bud does not have enough money to go there and is not old enough to get in. Jim suggests they double date so he can get into the club. They're about to leave to pick up Marissa and Jim tells Bud to take off the fake mustache. At the club, the Emcee announces this evenings entertainment, The Great Merado (Philip Van Zandt). The Great Merado starts out with some magic tricks. He then proceeds to some mind-reading and picks Bud as a subject. To Bud's embarrassment, everything about him, including his age, is revealed. When Bud walks Marissa to her door, she tells him she knew from the beginning that he wasn't 19. She says she still had a wonderful time and gives him a kiss goodnight. Note: Reruns of this episode were airing on ABC's affiliates in the Mountain Time Zone when the first reports that President Kennedy had been shot first reached the network; though other affiliates such as WABC-TV were airing other programs (such as, in WABC's case, a rerun of The Ann Sothern Show).
68	5	"The Homing Pigeon"	Peter Tewksbury	Paul West	October 10, 1956
Bud and his friends have been experimenting with homing pigeons. Bud's bird Charlie comes back from a 100 mile trip. Bud then has Charlie attempt a 500 mile trip. Meanwhile, Betty announces she is moving into an apartment with a friend of hers named Jean Barrett. Jim and Margaret are not sure about the move. Bud reads the paper and learns that Charlie might be flying right into a thunderstorm. Jim compares Betty with Charlie. They will give Betty her freedom and see if she comes home. Despite what they said, Jim and Margaret are surprised when Betty actually decides to leave. Jim drives Betty to the apartment. The storm is approaching their house and Bud is even more worried about Charlie. Jim and Bud are outside looking for Charlie and Bud has given up hope. Just as it starts to rain by them, Charlie makes it home. Not long after, Betty comes home.
69	6	"Spaghetti for Margaret"	Peter Tewksbury	Roswell Rogers	October 17, 1956
Margaret wins a raffle: a free spaghetti dinner once a week for a year. Jim's old friend Harper Eames (Herb Butterfield) visits his office. Harper mentions that there will be a banquet in his honor and he would like Jim to be his guest. Harper's policy has lapsed but Jim still wants to help him, since the old man still has dreams of being a famous writer. Years ago Harper sold a piece to a magazine, quit teaching, and was determined to start enjoying the good life as an author. He has interesting stories to tell but never had success. In his mind, he keeps believing that some day someone will throw him a banquet to celebrate his writings. Harper comes by the house. While waiting for Jim, Harper invites Kathy to his banquet and she is excited. Harper returns a pen he had taken from Jim's office. Margaret does not think Harper should make promises he cannot keep to Kathy. There never will be a banquet. Kathy comes home upset and says that her friends said that Harper is a crazy old man. Knowing how much Harper means to Jim, Margaret comes up with a plan to help. Margaret talks to Mr. Lazarro at the restaurant where she won the prize. Margaret arranges to get all her free meals on one night and throws a banquet for Harper. It is the night of the banquet and Jim learns that Harper had moved out of the place he was living at and never got the invitation. Jim sees Harper working in the kitchen. Jim figures out a way to get Harper into the banquet without him knowing that Jim saw him washing dishes. Sarah Selby as Miss Thomas.
70	7	"Betty's Birthday"	Peter Tewksbury	Story by : Herman Epstein, Teleplay by : Dorothy Cooper	October 24, 1956
After hearing a lecture a school, Betty decides it is primitive to give gifts. At the malt shop, Betty and Dottie enter a "Guess the number of jelly beans in the jar" contest. The prize is a gold heart with a genuine diamond. Betty's 18th birthday is coming up and she tells Dottie not to get her a gift. Kathy winds up winning the gold heart. Jim got Betty a wristwatch and Bud's been mowing lawns to buy Betty something. It is Betty's birthday and she seems uninterested. She tells the family she doesn't want any presents. Jim gets upset and Betty tries to explain to him her thoughts. Things are very awkward at dinner and Betty starts to feel bad. Jim talks to Betty and tells her that while the rest of the family will go along with her wishes, Kathy does not understand and her heart is broken that she cannot give Betty her gift. Betty agrees to accept Kathy's gift and it turns out to be the golden heart. Betty comes to realize what joy the family gets from giving her the gifts. Eleanor Audley as Saleslady.
71	8	"Bud, the Millionaire"	Peter Tewksbury	Paul West	October 31, 1956
It is Jim's birthday the next day. Bud is acting strangely and wants to talk to Jim. Bud feels he is being underpaid in his allowance, and he has to work to earn it. Jim says that one doesn't get something for nothing, they have to work for it. Jim decides to teach Bud a lesson by giving him $10 a week with the stipulation that he can only spend it on himself. Bud shows Kippy and Fred (Anthony Sydes) his money and they are impressed. Bud buys some candy but he cannot share it with the guys because of his deal with Jim. Kippy gets upset. Bud is acting like a big shot and Betty wonders if Jim did the right thing. Fred meets Bud at the movies and assumes Bud was buying his ticket. Fred calls Bud a cheapskate and leaves. Later, Kippy and Fred see Bud at the malt shop and start to tease him. Betty reminds Bud about Jim's birthday. Knowing he cannot use his money to buy a present, he asks Betty to lend him some. She refuses. Bud asks Margaret what he should do and she tells him it is his decision. He gives up his free $10 a week and buys Jim a gift. Bud learned it is no fun having money if you did not work for it and you cannot share it with others. Eleanor Audley as Woman Giving Spare Change.
72	9	"The Old Days"	Peter Tewksbury	Dorothy Cooper	November 7, 1956
Jim and Margaret plan to go to the PTA costume party that evening. Margaret tells Jim to pick up some costumes. Margaret doesn't like the casual way Betty is dressed. Margaret calls Jim and tells him she's come up with a costume idea. Jim doesn't like the way Bud wears his pants. Margaret suggests wearing clothes from their youth that was stored in the attic. Jim and Margaret reminisce about the day they got married. They get dressed for the party and Betty says they look ridiculous. Betty is helping at the party. She sees her parents wearing the clothes kids wear now-a-days. The couple that win first prize are wearing the same type of clothes that Jim and Margaret originally were going to wear. Betty feels bad that she made her parents change clothes. Jim explains to Betty that every generation has different styles and we should except that. When Jim and Margaret come home they find Betty and Bud dressed in their old clothes from the attic. Harry Hickox as Announcer At Dance.
73	10	"Whistle Bait"	Peter Tewksbury	Paul West	November 14, 1956
Mrs. Carr, the Dean of women, asks Betty to be a freshman counselor and help new girls at the college. Glen Clark and a couple other guys are talking to Betty and Dottie. A new girl walks by and the boys start whistling at her. At home, Betty overhears Bud talking to Jim about whistling at girls. Bud mentions that guys don't whistle at Betty. Jim can tell something is bothering Betty, but she will not tell him anything. At the malt shop, Betty asks Ralph if she walked by, would he whistle at her. Betty gets upset when Ralph says he wouldn't. At school, Betty and Dottie see the boys whistling at that girl again. Mrs. Carr assigns Betty to help Diane Mills (Mary Ellen Kay), a new girl, make friends. Diane turns out to be the girl that the boys are whistling at and Betty is not happy about it. Jim and Margaret ask Betty what's wrong and she again says nothing. A favor that Dottie asks Betty to do for her, upsets Betty even more. Diane comes by the house and Jim has to force Betty to talk to her. Diane asks Betty why none of the other girls will talk to her. Betty admits to being jealous of Diane. Betty comes to realize that Diane is really a nice person and they become friends.
74	11	"The Great Guy"	Peter Tewksbury	Roswell Rogers	November 21, 1956
Bud and Kippy go to work at a newspaper company and will be working every night. Margaret and Jim are worried about how it will affect his schoolwork. Their boss, Sinclair Bruder (Whit Bissell), is a real tough taskmaster. He constantly rides them for every little thing. Bud comes home exhausted. After a week, Bud would like to quit, but he cannot because he made such a big deal out of getting the job to his parents. Margaret tells Bud that the job seems too much for him, but he insists he can do it. Bud talks to Jim and tells him he wants to quit, but every time Margaret says something, he insists on keeping the job. Bud also mentions how tough Bruder is. Jim tells Bud that he has to give Bruder notice of him quitting. Kippy quits and Bud is about to, but then Bruder sticks up for Bud when there is a problem with some newspaper inserts. But later, Bruder picks on Bud for another mistake and Bud starts to tell him off and believes he's going to be fired. Turns out Mr. Bruder recommends Bud for a better position, because he knows he's a good worker and not a quitter. Bud turns the job down, because he's says he wants to stay with Mr. Bruder. Jim asks Bud why and Bud says because Bruder is a great guy.
75	12	"The Family Goes to New York"	Peter Tewksbury	Dorothy Cooper	November 28, 1956
Jim is hesitant to let Betty go to New York alone, but Margaret convinces him to let her go. Betty is going to NY to help her friend Barbara (Ann Baker) on her wedding day. Betty mentions that Tony, the best man, will be her escort around town, which Jim isn't thrilled about. Bud jokes about Tony falling for Betty because she'll be different than the New York women. Betty and Barbara are wined and dined by Barbara's rich Aunt Martha Huntington (Mary Adams). Betty calls home and tells the family about all the wonderful things she'll be doing. Betty meets Tony and the husband to be, Ray. Tony has been showing Betty the town and she starts to fall for him. Imagine the family's surprise when a picture of Betty and Tony show up in the newspaper. Worried about a possible romance, Jim and Margaret go to NY to check up on Betty. While out to dinner, Margaret, Jim and Betty see Tony with another girl. Betty realizes he was just being a nice guy and she let her emotions get the better of her.
76	13	"Betty Goes Steady"	Peter Tewksbury	Roswell Rogers; Based on an Article by: Cameron Shipp	December 5, 1956
Betty accepts a date invitation to the dance from Roger Kohlhoff. When Jim asks about the boy, Betty at first cannot remember his name. Betty says she's going steady with him as he's one of the "acceptables". Bud tells Jim and Margaret that he's now an editor on the high school paper. He's invited Mr. Beekman (Robert Vaughn), the paper's adviser, over to the house to go over some things. Later that evening, Dotty comes by and tells Betty how exciting it is to go steady with an "acceptable". Dotty tries to explain the social rules for acceptance by the college's "In Crowd" that dictates who's acceptable & who's not. Mr. Beekman comes by to see Bud. Mr. Beekman encourages Ralph Waldo Emerson's philosophy of asking "Why?" of anyone or anything that demands unquestioning obedience. He and Betty get into a heated discussion and he leaves. The night of the dance, Beekman finds an excuse to come by and talk to Betty again. He tells her exactly how her evening will go. And part of it happens the way he said when Roger comes by. After the dance, Margaret finds Betty sitting downstairs just thinking. Mr. Beekman finds Betty in the library reading a book on Emerson and asks her again to stop her unquestioning obedience. After another conversation with Dotty and Roger, Betty comes to realize Beekman was right. Eleanor Audley as Bookstacker in library.
77	14	"The Good Prospect"	Peter Tewksbury	Roswell Rogers	December 12, 1956
Jim is visiting his car salesman friend, Virg Carlson (Harry Hickox) at the dealership. Jim is hoping Virg can sponsor Bud's bowling team. While there, Jim meets Aldus Lydum (Don Beddoe) and thinks this might lead to a new insurance client. Aldus invites Jim & Margaret to visit he and his wife that night. At home, Kathy is selling donuts for her girl's club. Jim tells Bud that Virg is already sponsoring a team. Jim and Margaret go to see Aldus and they meet his wife (Mary Adams). Aldus acts as if everyone is a long-standing friend and that he has a lot of money. Bud and Kippy go to see Aldus and he agrees to sponsor their team. Aldus then buys several boxes of doughnuts from Kathy. But when it is time to come through with the money, Aldus doesn't have it. Kathy comes home crying and Margaret and Jim go to see Aldus. Aldus isn't home when they get to his house. Mrs. Lydum tells Jim and Betty that Aldus is a loving man, but he is irresponsible and a failure. He compensates by trying to act important, but she loves him anyway. Aldus comes home and he feels bad for hurting Kathy. He comes up with the money for her. And he found a sponsor for Bud's bowling team.
78	15	"The Angel's Sweater"	Peter Tewksbury	Roswell Rogers	December 19, 1956
It is Christmas Eve and Aunt Neva (Katherine Warren) has come to visit. Aunt Neva gets briefly upset when Kathy drops her suitcase by accident. Kathy starts to cry and goes to her room. Neva overhears Kathy tell Betty that she wished Aunt Neva had never come. After a water pipe bursts, Jim calls Mister Fixit (Ludwig Stössel). Mr Fixit tells a Christmas story to Kathy about a little girl in the "old country" named Katrina. Kathy imagines the story in her mind and her family are the characters. Katrina (Kathy) is trying to decide what gift she should give to the church for the poor. She wants it to be the greatest gift. Hans (Bud) comes by and asks Katrina to go to church with him. He is no help when he tells her that each must learn for themselves what the greatest gift is. An Angel (Betty) appears before Katrina. Something the angel says gives Katrina an idea. Katrina goes to Herr Grossenheimer's (Jim) shop. She wants to buy a sweater for the angel. As Katrina leaves the store, an old woman (Neva), who is dressed in black and no one likes, follows her. When Katrina isn't looking, the old woman steals the sweater. Katrina thinks the Angel took it. Something else the Angels says makes Katrina believe the greatest gift is love. Katrina sees the old woman with the sweater and tells her she loves her. The old woman becomes beautiful and dressed in silver and gold. Kathy finds it in her heart to tell Aunt Neva she loves her.
79	16	"The Promising Young Man"	Peter Tewksbury	Paul West	December 26, 1956
John Seastrom, vice president of Jim's company, asks Jim if he can show John's son Elwood (Richard Crenna) how to sell insurance. Jim agrees to help and lets John know. Jim goes to the train station, but not knowing what Elwood looks like, Jim doesn't find him. Apparently somewhere between when Elwood boarded the train and Springfield, he got off. Elwood comes driving up to the house. He explains that he stopped off to visit a friend. He then bought the car that he drove up in from a man that the friend knew. The family finds him to be very charming and a lot of fun. Elwood then leaves to visit another friend. The next morning, Jim and Miss Thomas (Sarah Selby) find Elwood sleeping in Jim's office. Emmet Ward (Willis Bouchey), one of Jim's clients, comes by and is upset that he hasn't received his policy yet. Emmet gives Jim an ultimatum and leaves. Later, Elwood tells the family an amusing story about his lost luggage at the hotel. However, his carefree nature and non-committal attitude leave Jim wondering if he can hold any job. Something Elwood does on a night out with Betty has Jim ready to send him home. But when Emmet comes back to the office furious, Jim learns that Elwood's traits actually make him sociable enough to work with clients.
80	17	"Margaret Hires a Gardener"	Peter Tewksbury	Roswell Rogers	January 2, 1957
Margaret is out working in the front garden. A friendly Mexican gardener named Frank (Natividad Vacío), but he pronounces it Fronk, drives up. Before Margaret knows what's happened, Fronk has talked his way into a job as her gardener. However, the more Jim tries to find out how much Frank will charge and how long things will take, the less is actually answered. It has been a week and despite the yard looking good, Jim finds that Fronk has been buying things without authorization. Jim cannot get Fronk to understand how things should work. The bills keep adding up and Jim cannot get through to good-natured Fronk. Jim decides that they have to let Frank go, but before Jim can tell him, Frank calls and says he will not be around for a couple months. Jim gets another call and learns Frank has been arrested. The family goes to see Frank as he appears before the Magistrate. Apparently the police thought Frank was taking flowers from a public park. With Jim's help, it is found out that he was actually planting the flowers.
81	18	"Swiss Family Anderson"	Peter Tewksbury	Paul West	January 9, 1957
Jack Griffin (Nelson Leigh), a friend of Jim's, is trying to talk Jim into buying an island that he owns. Jack tells Jim to at least go and take a look at it. At dinner, Jim brings up the island. Betty and Bud bring up how their home is outdated and falling apart. Margaret agrees. The family go to visit the island and see the beat-up old shack that is there. Betty is unimpressed and goes back to the boat. Betty winds up falling in the water and the untied boat drifts away. Bud and Kathy go for some firewood and Jim searches the island. Betty and Margaret try to straighten up the shack. Jim finds some potatoes and onions to eat. It is night and the family tries sleeping. Ranger Joe Malone (Don C. Harvey), who found their empty boat, comes to rescue the family. Once back home, they realize their old house is not so bad after all.
82	19	"Brief Holiday"	Peter Tewksbury	Roswell Rogers	January 16, 1957
Margaret complains to her friend Myrtle (Vivi Janiss) that she is tired of all the housework and demands of the children, expecting her to do their every whim. She decides to take a day off. She goes to a ritzy part of town, where she buys a hat, eats lunch at a French restaurant and has her portrait painted by a street artist (John Banner). Jim has Miss Thomas call Margaret about a repairman that is supposed to come by, but there is no answer. Seeing how late it is getting, Margaret runs out before the Artist is finished with her picture. But she leaves the hat bag with her address in it. When she returns home, the entire family wonders why nothings been done. The Artist comes to the door and gives Jim the bag and her portrait. Margaret for her part feels frustrated that Jim doesn't believe her simple and honest explanation for her actions. Jim's imagination runs wild as he wonders why Margaret suddenly ran out. Jim asks Miss Thomas her thoughts about what a wife hypothetically did. When Miss Thomas gives her answer, Jim wonders if he's been an inadequate husband. Jim races home because he thinks Margaret's going to leave him. After Margaret explains things again, Jim comes to understand.
83	20	"The Lawn Party"	Peter Tewksbury	Roswell Rogers	January 23, 1957
Bud wants to have a lawn party at the Anderson's home the next day. Bud says it will not be much work, but then rattles off a long list of things to do. Betty comes by saying she wants to have a slumber party the same night. Margaret tells her that Bud came first. Bud expects Jim & Margaret to do the work, without the teens even helping. The boys have a baseball game that they have to play in. Jim tells Bud if he cannot get some of the other parents to help, then he cannot have the party. Bud gets not one parent to volunteer. Jim is upset and says the party's off. The next day, Jim feels a little guilty but there's nothing that can be done. Then Mr. Messner (Fred Sherman), Mrs. Watkins (Paula Winslowe) and a bunch of other parents show up. Jim tries to explain that the party's off but everyone keeps working. One of the parents comments on how the Anderson house is the place everyone would like to be at. Jim and Margaret get a good feeling about the comment. Betty goes to tell the boys the party is on, but she cannot find them. The boys show up and apologize for putting Jim and Margaret on the spot the way they did. They say how much they like them and give Jim and Margaret a present. Betty then takes the boys outside to show them the party is on.
84	21	"Short Wave"	Peter Tewksbury	Paul West	January 30, 1957
Bud bought a shortwave radio and while trying it out, he picks up a signal from a cabin cruiser 1000 miles away. The ship is called the Betty Ann and the Allen family on it are talking to relatives on land. A radio operator sends out a weather bulletin about an approaching storm. The Coast Guard then sends a weather warning. The Anderson's can tell that the Betty Ann is not receiving the warnings and others cannot hear the Betty Ann. Now the Betty Ann is sending a distress call to the Coast Guard but are not getting through clearly. Jim decides to call the Cape Sharon Coast Guard on the phone. The long distance operator will get back to Jim. The Betty Ann has lost both of its engines and is taking on water. Jim gets through to the Coast Guard Skipper (John Bryant) and gives him the location of the Betty Ann. The Betty Ann learns that someone has relayed their distress call and location to the Coast Guard. The father says that if the people who helped are still listening, he thanks them. The Anderson's hear that the Betty Ann has been found and the family is now safe. Pamela Baird as Girl scout selling taffy.
85	22	"Carnival"	Peter Tewksbury	Paul West	February 6, 1957
Burt (Dick Foran), a carnival hustler, manages to fleece Bud out of six dollars he was supposed to use to get Jim's pants from the tailor. Bud tells his parents what happened and how surprised he is that the guy could talk him into it. Later, Bud and Kippy go back to Burt and ask him how he manages to get people to spend their money. Burt tells them the tricks of the trade and they wind up getting jobs at the carnival. The family goes to the carnival looking for Bud. They find Bud and Kippy working in a carnival dunking booth. Bud starts to enjoy the carnival lifestyle of tricking people out of their money. Bud was supposed to get paid the next day, but when he shows up, the carnival is gone. Back at home, there's a small package for Bud in the mailbox. It is from Burt and there is the expensive watch in it that Bud tried to win. Burt's note says that the watch cost $2 and every time Bud looks at it, he should remember to stay away from guys like him.
86	23	"Betty and the Jet Pilot"	Peter Tewksbury	Paul West	February 13, 1957
Lt. Charles Baron (Peter Walker), a jet pilot, encounters problems when flying over Springfield and loses his helmet. Bud finds the helmet and the family decides to find the pilot and return it. As a thank you, Charles would like to take Bud for a jet ride. Bud meets Colonel Shaine (Ken Mayer), who clears Bud for the flight. Later, Charlie comes by the house and he and Betty spend the evening together. Betty and Charles start dating and Betty falls in love with him. Betty tells Margaret that she thinks Charles is going to propose to her. Jim has a talk with Betty and she understands that because he's in the Air Force, he could be sent away at any time. During their picnic, Charles tells Betty there's a chance he will be transferred to Alaska. If he doesn't go, he would like to marry Betty. The next day at 9 o'clock Betty will find out his fate.
87	24	"Trip to Hillsborough"	Peter Tewksbury	Roswell Rogers	February 20, 1957
Bud and Kippy want to travel for new experiences and write exciting stories. They want to go to Hillsborough by themselves and stay over night. When Bud starts to mention it to Jim, Jim thinks the boys want him to go along. Jim hears Bud tell Margaret that the boys wanted to go alone. Jim then tells Bud he has other plans. Margaret is worried, but Jim says the boys will be fine. The boys are to ride in the back of a truck driven by Bick Norton (Horace McMahon). Kippy backs out at the last minute, so Bud winds up going by himself. Bick recommends a cheaper hotel than the one Bud planned on staying at. At the hotel, Bud sees a bearded man who acts very suspiciously. Bud writes about how he might be a spy. That night, Margaret is still worried. Jim says that the manager at the hotel will watch out for them, not knowing Bud is at a different place. The next morning, Kippy comes by and they realize Bud is alone. Jim calls the hotel and finds out that Bud's not there. Jim finds the hotel he's at and Margaret wants to drive there to get him. The Desk Clerk (Percy Helton) leaves a note for Bud, but he doesn't see it. Jim arrives, but the Desk Clerk mistakenly thinks Bud has already left. Bud sees the family driving off. Jim comes back and finds Bud. Bud tells Jim that he didn't find all the excitement he thought he would. Bud and Jim ride back in Bick's truck. Ralph Sanford as hotel guest.
88	25	"An Evening to Remember"	Peter Tewksbury	Roswell Rogers	February 27, 1957
At the office, Jim gets a call from Myron Hansen (Lloyd Corrigan), a client. Jim is in a rush to make an appointment and cannot take the phone call. Cornel Wilde arrives at the Anderson house wanting to talk to Jim. He tells Margaret that he had a car accident while traveling through Springfield. After the initial shock of seeing Cornell, she invites him to stay for dinner. Cornell winds up taking a phone message for Betty. Jim arrives home and is stunned to see Cornell. Jim learns from Cornell that it was Mr. Hansen that hit his car. Cornell is afraid that, because he's a movie star, Hansen is going to sue for a lot of money. Cornell is ready to fight as he knows he was not at fault. Cornell answers the phone again and it is the babysitter saying she cannot make it tonight. The rest of the family have plans for the evening, so Cornell offers to stay with Kathy. Jim is trying to work with Cornell, but keeps getting interrupted by the family. Myron shows up, and not knowing Cornell is there, he embellishes the way the accident occurred and hopes to get a big pay day from the movie star. After introducing Myron to Cornell, Jim puts a stop to Myron's lawsuit plans.
89	26	"Bud Buys a Car"	Peter Tewksbury	Paul West	March 13, 1957
Bud tries to tell Margaret about a used car he wants to buy, but she doesn't really pay attention as she is against it. Not knowing Bud had already talked to Margaret, Jim reluctantly says Bud can have the car. Margaret is not happy. The next morning, Bud gets up early and goes to pick up the car. Bud and Doug push the car home and it is quite a wreck. Bud is disappointed that Margaret and Betty don't seem excited about the car. He spends much of the day working on the car, but he cannot get it to run. When Margaret and Betty see how hard Bud is working on the car, they feel sorry for him and decide to help. Jim comes home and sees the three of them working. They finally get the car started.
90	27	"Safety First"	Peter Tewksbury	Paul West	March 20, 1957
Jim tells Bud to be more careful when he's driving, but Jim doesn't think he's getting through to him. Kathy's worried when a policeman comes to the door looking for Jim. It's the Chief of Police and he asks Jim to be chairman of the city's safe driving campaign that starts next month. Bud is driving with Claude and Tracey (Dee Pollock) when he has to stop short at an intersection with children. Mrs. Brian (Ethel May Halls), the crossing guard, lectures him about being safer. The boys think she's just picking on them. At home, Bud complains about Mrs. Brian over-reacting. Bud goes out to get Margaret some paint. When he comes back, he tells Betty he got a ticket. At dinner, Jim talks about the safety campaign and Bud leaves the table. Betty tells Jim he should talk to Bud. Bud tells Jim about the ticket but claims he wasn't at fault. Jim has to figure out how make Bud understand that he cannot be that careless. Jim, Margaret and Bud are in court. Jim tells Margaret that he talked to the Judge earlier and they came up with a plan. The Judge suspends Bud's license for a week and makes him Crossing Guard for a day. While helping children cross the street, Bud quickly learns his lesson about safety.
91	28	"Bud, the Hero"	Peter Tewksbury	Roswell Rogers	March 27, 1957
Bud is bragging to his friends about the heroic deed he did. Jim tells us how this all came to be in flashback. Betty is at the beauty shop listening to Edie tell Irma she needs to find someone to take her to the party. Irma suggests Edie trap Bud, which she does. Bud needs money for a broken fan belt for his car so he can go on the date. Betty tries to tell Bud what she heard Edie say in the beauty parlor. Bud manages to get the money from Jim. Jim asks Bud to go to the bank to make a deposit as he is busy. With the help of his fan belt, Bud stops a bank robbery without realizing it and completely by accident. Everyone thinks he was quite brave and is considered a hero. Back to the present where Bud is bragging to his friends. Reverend Swain comes by the house. He would like Bud to relate his story of his heroism at the church youth rally. Bud confesses to the Reverend and his friends that he really didn't do anything heroic. The Reverend says it takes a great deal of courage to tell the truth. Note: Jim Anderson (Sr.) breaks the "fourth wall" explaining how the story evolved.
92	29	"Betty, the Track Star"	Peter Tewksbury	Paul West	April 3, 1957
Bud comments on how Betty is constantly trying to make herself pretty. The family learns that Betty is one of three girls in the finals for Flower Queen of Springfield Junior College and she is getting a lot of attention. Bud cannot believe all the fuss that is being made about it. Elvia Horsen, captain of the girls' track team, asks Betty to pose for a picture with the team to get some publicity. Betty agrees, but when she learns she will have to wear a track suit, she regrets saying yes. During the photo shoot, Gloria (Fintan Meyler) gives Betty a hard time about being a glamour girl. Elvia sees Betty run and beat Gloria. Elvia now wants her to join the team. Betty reluctantly agrees, knowing that the track meet is within minutes of the Flower Queen judging. Jim thinks Betty can do both and plans to get her dress and everything else ready. Betty wins the race, and the team hustles her off to get dressed for the judging. With the teams help, Betty also wins the Flower Queen pageant.
93	30	"The Spelling Bee"	Peter Tewksbury	Roswell Rogers	April 17, 1957
Jim and Margaret are proud that Kathy got spelling honors in her class. Bud makes light of Kathy's achievement. Kathy tells her parents that she is to compete in the school spelling bee. Betty gives her a penny that she says is good luck. Kathy wins, but now is scared because she must compete in the county championship. She feels better when she remembers her lucky penny. At the hotel, Kathy meets Mara Zerney (Beverly Washburn), another girl who is competing. Kathy lets Mara wear one of her dresses. Everyone is about to leave for the contest. Kathy cannot find her lucky penny and is scared and crying. During the competition, Mara finds the penny in the dress and Kathy manages to get it back. Kathy and Mara are the two finalists. Feeling sorry for Mara, Kathy loses on purpose. Ahna Capri as Lisping Spelling Bee Contestant.
94	31	"Bud, the Philanthropist"	Peter Tewksbury	Roswell Rogers	April 27, 1957
Bud tells Jim that his Sunday School teacher, Mr. Royal (William Leslie), suggested starting a fund for a younger injured boy named Frankie (Barry Curtis). The plan is to buy Frankie a radio. Bud had a 10 dollar bill that he was going to buy track shoes with. He didn't want to put it all in, but he didn't want to not give anything. He went back to the room and put the money in the box, but none of his friends saw him do it. Bud just wishes that someone knew what he did. Betty tells the family that she found out from Mr. Royal that the boys raised $10.39. Bud cannot believe the others only chipped in 39 cents. The next Sunday, Kippy gets credit for Bud's donation and Bud is upset. Knowing he shouldn't brag of his good deed, Bud tries to find other ways to get credit. Even when the family finds out that Kippy is getting the credit, Jim tells Bud to let it go. Not knowing that Bud was the one to put in the money, Kippy confesses to Bud that he didn't do it. Kippy feels really bad about how things turned out. He wants Bud to deliver the radio to Frankie. When giving the radio to Frankie, Bud has the chance to take the credit, but he doesn't.
95	32	"Baby in the House"	Peter Tewksbury	Paul West	May 1, 1957
Betty offers to babysit the whole weekend for the Harris'. Instead of Betty staying at the Harris house, Jim suggests bringing the baby to their house. The baby will be Betty's responsibility. Bud is against the idea. Little Ritchie arrives at the house. Mildred (Gloria Henry) and Les Harris thank Margaret and Jim. Kathy is getting jealous of all the attention Ritchie is getting. A friend offers Betty a ticket to a play she wants to see that night. Margaret and Jim say they will babysit so she can go to the play. Bud gets upset because he and Jim were supposed to go to the auto show. At first Margaret and Jim enjoy having an infant in the house again. But, then things start to get a little hectic. Later that night, Mildred comes by saying they just couldn't stay away from Ritchie. After Mildred leaves with the baby, Bud says that Kathy is not in her room. They find Kathy sleeping in the baby crib.
96	33	"Class Prophecy"	Peter Tewksbury	Roswell Rogers	May 8, 1957
While selling cookies, Kathy runs into a kitchen utensil salesman who is not doing so well. The salesman comes to the Anderson house. Margaret answers the door and recognizes him as Henry Pruett (Harry Townes), an old classmate. He hides his briefcase of utensils. She remembers that after college, Henry went to medical school. Margaret asks about his wife Julie (Betty Lou Gerson). Margaret insists the two come over for dinner. Jim comes home and is thrilled to see Henry. Jim asks about his medical job and Henry is evasive and uneasy. Bud find the case and Jim says they'll hang onto it as the salesman will surely come back for it. Henry rushes off. Kathy comes home and when she sees the case, she tells Margaret about the salesman not being very good. Margaret opens the case and she finds out it belongs to Henry. Jim has to think of a way to get Henry his case back without him knowing what they found out. Margaret calls Julie and she says they will come to dinner. Henry and Julie are over and having a good time. But things get awkward when the subject of the briefcase comes up. Jim finally talks to Henry and finds a way to make Henry feel better about his life.
97	34	"The Art of Romance"	Peter Tewksbury	Paul West	May 15, 1957
Bud has been spending a lot of time at the library. Betty mentions that the High School Prom is next week. Jim and Margaret are surprised Bud hasn't said anything about it. Betty goes to the library and talks to her friend Marge Corbett. Marge says that Bud and her little sister Judy (Joan Freeman) have been sitting at the same table every night that week. Marge says what's funny is, they don't talk to each other and barely look at one another. Betty tells her parents what she saw. Jim tells Bud that he has to take the first step with Judy, but Bud doesn't think Judy likes him. Judy comes by the house to pick up some things from Betty. Judy asks Betty why Bud doesn't like her and Betty gives her some advice. Jim tells Bud that Judy is playing cat-and-mouse with him and Jim lets him know what he should do. Betty overhears this and calls Judy. Both Jim and Betty's advice is starting to backfire with neither Bud nor Judy getting any closer to going to the prom together. Jim is upset when he finds out Betty's been helping Judy. Margaret gives Bud some advice and in the end Judy accepts Bud's invitation to the prom. Elizabeth Harrower as Librarian.
98	35	"Margaret Disowns Her Family"	Peter Tewksbury	Roswell Rogers	May 22, 1957
Margaret decides to sell the old baby crib. Esther Garvin (Christine White), an expecting mother, sees Margaret's ad in the paper. Esther and her husband Walt arrive at the Anderson house. They are young as well as being nervous about being parents. It does not help that Margaret is having a bad parenting day and is really irritated with the family. The couple pay for the crib and say they'll be by that evening to pick it up. Margaret can sense that Esther is scared. That night, Margaret is still having a rough time and is worried about Esther. Meanwhile, the young mother begins to have doubts about her coming baby and her marriage. Esther calls her mother who lives out of town. She wants to go see her mother and says she never should've gotten married. Esther comes by the Anderson house and says she will not be buying the crib. Esther says she's going to see her mother. Margaret has a long talk with her and eases her doubts. Walt, who had to work late, comes by to pick up the crib. Because of Margaret's talk, Esther is very happy to see him.
99	36	"Grandpa Retires"	Peter Tewksbury	Roswell Rogers	May 29, 1957
Margaret's mother Martha (Sylvia Field) sends a letter saying she would like to have the family come to visit. Margaret's father Emmett (Ernest Truex) feels his health is failing and he needs to sell his business to retire. Martha would like Jim to help. Once there, Martha tells Jim that Emmett is being stubborn and keeps delaying selling his print shop. Jim goes with Emmett to the shop. Jim meets Verle Wisman (Herbert Anderson), the man who'll be buying the business. Jim talks to Verle and Verle says how frustrated he is that he hasn't been able to take over the shop yet. Verle says he's had enough and wants out. Jim talks him into waiting a couple more days. Jim and Verle are at the shop with Emmett home claiming to be sick. Employee Ed (Ken Christy) says another machine is down and they have an order that needs to get out. Jim calls the house and Emmett says he'll be right there. Emmett arrives at the shop all excited. Jim realizes that Emmett's happiest when he's working. Jim talks Verle into working for Emmett and he'll learn the business. And eventually Verle will take over. Margaret learns that Jim may have had a hand in the machine breaking down. Note: Sylvia Field and Herbert Anderson would go on to work together in the Dennis the Menace TV series. This is the first episode where actress Elinor Donahue is obviously pregnant. Attempts were made hide the fact.
100	37	"Shoot for the Moon"	Peter Tewksbury	Roswell Rogers	June 5, 1957
Bud is procrastinating chopping some firewood. Margaret hires a man named Sageman (Royal Dano) to do the job. Bud also gave up on writing a speech for a school contest. Kathy complains about some warts on her hands. Sageman arrives and he only wants to be paid in meals. Ed Davis (Robert Foulk) comes by and asks Jim if he spoke with Mr. Stonehauser about a large insurance deal. Believing he couldn't pull off the deal, Jim didn't talk to Stonehauser. Sageman tells Kathy he can cure her warts. He also shows an interest in helping the other Anderson's with their problems. Sageman quietly shares his views of life with the Anderson's and inspires them all. He wants to stage a bonfire ritual in which the Andersons' problems will all be solved. Margaret doesn't believe in any of this, but she'll allow Sageman to build a bonfire in the fireplace. That night Sageman begins the ritual and tells them all they have a power within them. Jim suddenly gets a call from Stonehauser and Kathy thinks her warts are getting smaller. Bud decides to work on his speech. Margaret learns that Jim played a part in everyone getting inspired.

=== Season 4 (1957–58) ===
No. overall	No. in season	Title	Directed by	Written by	Original release date
101	1	"Follow the Leader"	Peter Tewksbury	Paul West	September 25, 1957
Bud is extremely excited for the new school year to start. He is also looking forward to seeing Mr. Jeffery, a popular History teacher. At school, Bud is accused by Mr. Armstead (Sam Flint), the Principal, of breaking his office window. Mr. Beckman (Wright King), a new teacher, tells Mr. Armstead that he saw another boy do it. Before History class, all the students are eager to see Mr. Jeffery. Everyone is shocked when Mr. Beckman walks in. Mr. Beckman senses that the class is not happy to see him. Some of the guys plan to make trouble for Beckman and get him kicked out. Bud reluctantly agrees to help. Beckman tells Bud that he's going to need a friend to help him win over the students. Bud asks his parents what he should do and Jim says he'll have to make that decision. At school, Bud tells Mr. Armstead that he has a broken toe and will not be able to go to History class. Something Armstead says makes Bud realize he has to help Beckman. In class when no one will answer Beckman's questions, Bud stands up and shows he is willing to accept the new man. This helps Beckman win the confidence of the rest of the class. Ray Stricklyn as Duke.
102	2	"The Awkward Hero"	Peter Tewksbury	Paul West	October 2, 1957
Betty is excited to be chosen as a tutor for the football team and hopes to be teamed up with one of the handsome team players. Her enthusiasm fades when she is teamed up with Merle "Muley" Orkin, a socially awkward young man. Betty tells the family how disappointed she is to be stuck with Muley. Bud, on the other hand, is excited because Muley is a star player and he hopes to become friends with him. That night while being tutored, Muley has concentration issues and is clearly infatuated with Betty. Merle asks if she'll be at tomorrow's game, but she has to study. He then asks her to a dance tomorrow night, but she turns him down. The next day while studying, Bud and Betty are listening to the game on the radio. Betty gets caught up in the excitement when Muley gets a touchdown. After the game, Muley stops by and asks Betty to a dance again, but because she already has a date, she turns him down. A group of girls come to the house looking for Muley. Betty decides she needs to protect Muley and agrees to change her plans and go with him. At the dance, Muley begins to have a change of heart over Betty because she's starting to act more like his mother. Muley meets Shirley (Anne Whitfield) at the dance and abandons Betty for her. Betty is happy for Merle, but also sad that he doesn't need her anymore. Ted Husing as Announcer. Jana Lund as Midge Patterson. Note: This is the first time viewers see Betty Anderson without her trademark ponytail.
103	3	"The Good Neighbor"	Peter Tewksbury	Andy White	October 9, 1957
Margaret receives the title deeds to a second property from her parents. Margaret and Betty go to see the house. Mr. Boomhauer (Joseph Sweeney), the neighbor, has his rose garden inside of Margaret's property line. Margaret wants to widen the driveway and the rose garden will need to be moved. Margaret tells Mr. Boomhauer, who is a very unpleasant man, that she intends on renting the house. He gets very upset when Margaret mentions moving his garden. Margaret hires workers to start on the driveway. Boomhauer has his lawyer, Mr. Sprague, serve Margaret with a court summons. Days later, Margaret tries talking to Boomhauer, but it does no good. The night before she goes to court, Margaret has a bad dream. Both the Judge and all the jury members are Boomhauer. Margaret is found guilty and sent to jail in the clouds. The next day at court, Boomhauer doesn't show up. Judge Horace Kern (Henry Hunter) dismisses the case. Even though the court ruled in her favor, Margaret comes to a compromise with Mr. Boomhauer. Boomhauer brings Margaret some roses.
104	4	"Bud, the Executive"	Peter Tewksbury	Paul West	October 16, 1957
Nancy Crail asks Bud if he would join the school committee for the yearly picnic. He turns her down thinking it's silly. Jim and Margaret talk Bud into going to the meeting and be a leader. Bud goes to the meeting and it's very disorganized. He ends up being put in charge. Bud is not happy about having to assign jobs to the others. After making a few good suggestions and being complimented by faculty advisor Mr. Briggs, Bud starts to get a big head. But Mr. Briggs mentions that everything needs to be done by Friday. Bud's ego gets even bigger when there's a story about him in the local paper. Bud runs into trouble when some of the people he assigned to do things cannot get their jobs done. Bud tries to get the things done himself but has no luck. The family comes up with some suggestions and Bud gets back to work. At the meeting on Friday, Bud tells the committee that everything has been arranged. Nancy Crail says that Bud pretty much did the whole thing, but Bud says that his family helped.
105	5	"Sentenced to Happiness"	Peter Tewksbury	Roswell Rogers	October 23, 1957
The Anderson's former gardener returns for a visit to get help with his new job. Frank (Natividad Vacío) is going to be a gardener for a government building but first has to pass a civil service exam. Jim wants Betty to help Frank study. Jim tells Margaret how he happened to wind up helping Frank. Frank was working for a banker and was buying and charging plants to the man's account without the banker's permission. The banker took Frank to court and Frank mentions Jim's name to the Judge (Robert Burton). Flashback to the Judge's chambers. The Judge tells Frank he will have to pay for the plants. He mentions the new job and the exam he has to pass to keep the job. The Judge says that if he does this and becomes responsible, he will be happy. Back to the present, Frank becomes distracted while Betty is studying with him. Instead of making a payment for the banker's plant's, Frank buys a tulip tree for the Anderson's. The Judge calls up Jim and says Frank didn't show up to his job. He was helping Margaret decorate for a party at the children's hospital. The morning of the test, Frank takes the Foreman's (Frank Gerstle) truck to do something. The Judge, Jim, the Foreman and a Policeman (Morgan Jones) find the truck by a forest. It turns out Frank took Kathy's friends to dig up arrowheads. In the end, maybe this new job is not the key to his happiness. With Jim's help, Frank will find a job he likes and pay off his debt.
106	6	"Mother Goes to School"	Peter Tewksbury	Roswell Rogers	October 30, 1957
Kathy puts on a puppet show for Jim reminiscent of Punch and Judy. Kathy then makes Jim put on a show and has Margaret watch. Margaret tells Jim a friend of hers is taking a class in junior college and she's going to take one as well. Betty learns that Margaret and her will be in the same English class and Betty is excited. But after a while, Betty starts to feel Margaret is wasting the classes time by asking too many questions. Betty is so embarrassed, she puts in for a transfer to another class. Margaret feels she is doing something wrong and that Betty now dislikes her. She wants to drop out of school, but Jim says he'll talk to Betty. Betty comes by Jim's office and tells him she just cannot be around Margaret for a while. Kathy says something to Bud that gives Margaret the answer. Margaret and Betty talks things out and Margaret tells her she's signed up for an adult evening class. Charles Meredith as Prof. Brown.
107	7	"The Indispensable Man"	Peter Tewksbury	John Elliotte	November 6, 1957
Bud is practicing his football kicking in the driveway. The ball winds up in the kitchen and ruins the family desert. Bud tries out for the football team as their kicker and gets accepted by Coach Harper (William Leslie). The Coach gives him a set of team rules. Martin the photographer (Charles Tannen) is impressed with Bud and takes his picture for the local paper. Bud now thinks he can do just about anything. That night, Claude calls Bud and tells him about the article in the paper about him. Bud breaks the team rule about being in bed by nine and goes to buy some papers. The family convinces Bud to tell the Coach he broke training. Bud is suspended from playing one game — a really important game. Bud goes to the game thinking the Coach will change his mind and put him in. But when the team wins without him, Bud thinks he is now worthless. The Coach tells Bud that it took a big man to admit he broke training and he's still on the team.
108	8	"Kathy's Big Chance"	Peter Tewksbury	Roswell Rogers	November 13, 1957
Everyone in Kathy's class has to write a civil war essay. The essays will be entered in a contest and the winner will meet Greer Garson, who is in town for the premier of her period-piece civil war movie. Kathy fantasizes that she meets Greer who is dressed as a wealthy Confederate lady. They talk about how intellectual Kathy is. Kathy is one of the finalists in the contest and is to go to Greer's hotel that evening and then to her movie. But she comes down with the measles and cannot go. Kathy is very sad. She asks Jim to try and get Greer's autograph. Jim is able to talk to Greer and tell her about Kathy not being able to come. But before he can get her autograph, Greer is whisked away to go to the movie. Much to Kathy's joy, when Jim comes home, he brings Greer with him. Kathy convinces Greer to act out part of the movie for the family. Greer tells Kathy that she will always remember her.
109	9	"Margaret Learns to Drive"	Peter Tewksbury	Paul West	November 20, 1957
When there is nothing to eat for breakfast, the kids think Jim should get upset. They think he is just too reasonable and are surprised at how infrequently Jim and Margaret quarrel. Margaret couldn't get to the store because there was no one around to take her there. Bud asks why she hasn't learned to drive yet. Jim agrees to start teaching Margaret when he gets home from work. The first lesson does not go well and Jim is not as reasonable as he usually is. Jim and Margaret act in front of the kids as if the lesson was a success. Betty says how lucky they are to have parents who get along so well. That night Jim and Margaret wonder what caused them to snap at each other during the lesson. The next morning they try another lesson. Myrtle Davis (Vivi Janiss) walks by and Margaret offers to drive her to the drug store. Margaret cause a traffic jam in the middle of the street. In the house, the children are surprised to hear Jim and Margaret fighting. Betty knows better, but tells Bud and Kathy that their parents were just putting on an act. Jim gets Margaret a driving instructor.
110	10	"Way of a Dictator"	Peter Tewksbury	Roswell Rogers	December 4, 1957
Bud tells Jim that he's doing a school paper on dictators. Kathy is jumping rope in the house. Bud is annoyed at Kathy being irresponsible and tells Jim and Margaret they need to be firm with her. Jim and Margaret decide to let him have a chance at child-rearing. Jim doesn't think Bud will last a half a day doing it. Bud finds out that Kathy has broken Betty's good pen. He tells her he will not let Betty know as long as she does whatever he says. And Kathy will need to buy Betty a new pen. The parents wonder how Bud has gotten Kathy to be so good. It's been several days and Betty asks Margaret if she's seen her pen. Jim hears that Kathy is trying to earn some money. He asks her what she needs the money for, but she is evasive. Kathy finally has enough money and buys Betty a new pen. Jim and Margaret find out that Bud has been blackmailing Kathy and turn the tables on him. Jim also makes Bud write a paper about Bud being a dictator.
111	11	"Mr. Beal Meets His Match"	Peter Tewksbury	Roswell Rogers	December 11, 1957
Betty reads a story to the family that she wrote for school that is about them. In the story, Bud meets a strange man named Harry Beal (John Williams). Bud is surprised that Harry knows everything about his family. Harry wants to send Bud a set of books that will give him the "keys to the world". Jim tells Bud that nothing in life is free and wants Bud to send the books back. When the books arrive, everyone but Jim are very interested in them. Kathy sees a picture of a bike in one of the books and wishes she had it. Not long after something happens that causes Kathy to get the bike. Bud wishes for a car he sees in the book. While going to school the next morning, a situation arises with a man that needs to get to the airport. The man's car has a flat tire. He trades his car for Bud's and it's exactly like the one in the book. Margaret starts to grow concerned about the books and wants to get rid of them. Jim meets Beal and learns that the books cannot be returned as they have been used. Jim finds out Beal is an agent of the Devil and payments for the wishes are the person's souls. Jim fights Harry and agrees to give his soul in exchange for his kids. Margaret's love for Jim causes Beal to lose his power.
112	12	"Kathy Makes a Wish"	Peter Tewksbury	Paul West	December 25, 1957
Kathy makes a wish on an old horseshoe that she will get a pony, and she will name him Cookie. When Kathy wakes up the next morning, she is disappointed that there is no pony. But then she figures it's too early and the pony will arrive later. A pony does show up at the house, but it belongs to a man (George Selk) who takes pictures with it. He takes some pictures with Kathy sitting on the pony. Kathy still believes it is hers but Margaret tells Kathy that she should let the man use the pony for a while. Kathy wishes on the horseshoe that Cookie would come back to her. Kathy has a dream where she is riding Cookie around the house while she's wearing a cowboy outfit. Cookie eats dinner at the table with the family. Kathy announces that her and Cookie are engaged. After she wakes up, she's more convinced than ever that Cookie will come back. It's not long and Cookie does come back, but only because it found some candy to eat at their house. Jim convinces Kathy that Cookie is not hers and the man lets the pony spend the night with Kathy.
113	13	"Man with a Plan"	Peter Tewksbury	Andy White	January 1, 1958
Bud is thinking of joining the Army after he is out of high school in two years. Margaret is against the idea and wants Jim to talk to him. Jim thinks it will "make a man of him". Margaret starts treating him with exceptional kindness because she doesn't want to lose her son. Bud misleads Sally Dixon, a girl he is interested in, about signing up for the Army. Sally cancels a date she had with another boy so she can go to the dance with Bud. Because of the way Bud is talking, she believes he is leaving soon and wants to throw him a going-away party the next night. Jim tells Bud he has to go to the party and explain how he is not really leaving. At the party, everyone is congratulating Bud and are very excited for him. They give him a gift and say how proud they are of him. Jim and Margaret show up just as Bud is about to tell everyone the truth. To help Bud save face with the kids, Margaret says she will not let Bud enlist until he finishes school. The kids decide to go on with the party to celebrate Bud not leaving.
114	14	"Big Sister"	Peter Tewksbury	Roswell Rogers	January 8, 1958
Kathy mentions to Bud that she's going to 3-day Indian Springs Summer Camp. She also reads some of Betty's diary to Bud. Betty tells Margaret and Bud that she got a counselor job at Indian Springs. Betty finds out Kathy has been reading her diary and is furious. She cannot believe that Margaret isn't going to punish Kathy. Betty tells Bud that she'll be able to get him a job at the camp. But the job she gets him is as a dishwasher. At camp, Betty makes it perfectly clear to Kathy that she's playing no favorites with her. Betty is pretty rough on Kathy because she wants Kathy to win the golden arrow award. She also doesn't want Kathy to embarrass her in front of camp director Mrs. Ellis (Florida Friebus). Something Kathy does causes her group to not pass Mrs. Ellis' cabin inspection. Betty is even harder on Kathy. It's the last night of camp and a storm is coming. Kathy has had enough and takes off to walk home. Betty, realizing that she has been too hard on her, goes to find Kathy. Stanley Adams as Mack.
115	15	"Calypso Bud"	Peter Tewksbury	Roswell Rogers	January 15, 1958
Bud gets a set of bongo drums from his friend Claude. Jim and Margaret remind him how he never practiced other instruments he wanted for very long. But Bud does keep up with his practicing and is getting better. Jim and Margaret wonder what his motivation is. They don't know that Bud envisions himself as a musician that all the girls will love. He wants to take his drums to Jeanie's upcoming party, hoping to show up Kippy and his magic act. Bud wants to get a Calypso shirt to wear to the party. The day of the party, Bud comes home saying he's not going. Bud tells Betty that he ran into Jeanie, who doesn't know that Bud has the bongos now. She wonders if Bud could ask Claude not to bring the bongos because he just bores everyone when he plays them. Bud is disappointed and upset. Jim figures out a way for Jeanie to get Bud to go to the party with his bongos. Sir Lancelot as Bongo Instructor.
116	16	"Father's Biography"	Peter Tewksbury	Roswell Rogers	January 22, 1958
Kathy has written, as a class assignment, an unintentionally humorous biography about Jim. A PTA presentation has been arranged at Kathy's school for her to honor him. Kathy is excited to have her father attend. Later, John Rosser (George N. Neise) of the Commerce Committee comes by and speaks to Margaret. John would like Jim to attend the next Committee meeting and become a member. John believes Jim could be the next president of the Committee. Margaret has to make sure Jim shows up. The family learns that the PTA and the Committee meeting are on the same night. Margaret gets Kathy to understand how important the Committee meeting is. At the PTA meeting, Kathy is clearly sad that Jim isn't there. While at the Committee meeting, Jim learns that one of the members isn't there because he was being honored by the PTA. Just as Kathy is about to read her paper, Jim shows up. In a fantasy sequence, Jim must explain to St. Peter (Robert Warwick) why he made his choice to be with Kathy. Bernadette Withers as Sheila Groves.
117	17	"The Rivals"	Peter Tewksbury	Paul West	January 29, 1958
Betty and Ralph are going square dancing. Marge Corbett (Barbara Eden), a friend of Betty's, stops by the house. Marge is going to the dance with John Davis, but she's also been seeing Frank. Betty notices that Marge seems to juggle boyfriends all the time. Margaret mentions to Betty that she had other men around when she was seeing Jim. Bud teases Betty that she only has one boyfriend. At the dance, several different boys dance with Marge. Betty starts to wonder why Ralph seems to be the only one after her. After the dance, Betty, Ralph, Marge and John are at a diner. Doyle Hobbs (Roger Smith), an old acquaintance of Betty's, comes by and says hello. The next morning Doyle calls Betty and asks her out for that night. Betty decides to try the exciting life with two boyfriends. Ralph calls to say what time he'll pick Betty up that night. Jim is upset that Betty is playing the two men. But a problem arises when the two men find out Betty made a date with both of them for that night.
118	18	"Bud, the Mind Reader"	Peter Tewksbury	Roswell Rogers	February 5, 1958
Bud and Kippy go to see a performance of The Great Endor (Henry Corden), a mind-reader. Bud decides to try his hand at mind-reading. Through some coincidences, Bud actually thinks he can do it. Meanwhile, Betty hopes to go to Washington D.C. for a debating contest. Kippy tells Bud they have a chance to see a show for free and then go out with some of the chorus girls afterwards. Bud is reluctant at first because the family is to take Betty to the airport. Bud agrees to go and Kippy says he better not back out later. Betty is upset when she learns she didn't get picked for the trip. When they hear about the chorus girls, Jim and Margaret forbid Bud to go. Bud sneaks out to tell Kippy he cannot go and Kippy says his folks wouldn't let him go either. Bud sees Betty and Ralph outside the theater. Back home, Margaret gets a call that Betty can go on the trip. They must find her quickly. Bud finds a way to let them know where Betty is. Bud admits to Jim that he snuck out and Jim's glad he told the truth.
119	19	"Margaret's Other Family"	Peter Tewksbury	Roswell Rogers	February 12, 1958
Mr. Kermit (Henry Jones), a furniture maker, comes by the Anderson house. He tries to sell various items to Margaret. She agrees to let him fix some lawn chairs. Mr. Kermit has a way of getting people to help him with things. Jim worries that Margaret is spending a lot of time helping Mr. Kermit and his wife Pearl (Nora Marlowe). She is doing errands, chores and housework for them. The family feels Margaret is being taken advantage of. Even Jim winds up doing an errand for Mr. Kermit. With Betty's help, Margaret wallpapers the Kermit's living room. Jim has finally had enough and goes over to speak to Mr. Kermit about it. Jim feels bad when he finds out that Mr. Kermit is building Margaret a chaise lounge as a thank you.
120	20	"The Trial"	Peter Tewksbury	Roswell Rogers	February 19, 1958
Mr. Grouseman, the Andersons' neighbor, accuses Bud of causing property damage because his jacket was left in his yard. Bud denies doing the damage but evidence points to him. Betty says it is circumstantial evidence and says the family should hold a trial. Betty is acting as Bud's defense lawyer, but he will not tell her where he really was. Jim acts as the prosecuting lawyer and details what Mr. Grouseman said happened and what was damaged. During the trial, Mr. Grouseman comes over with Mrs. Lester, a neighbor of his. Mrs. Lester claims to have actually seen Bud in the alley by Grouseman's house. She also has some other damaging things to say. Jim tells Bud how disappointed he is in him. Bud wants to continue with the trial, but even Betty doesn't see the point. Bud tells his side of the story which involves his friend April wanting to curl his hair. He still has no explanation as to how his jacket got into Mr. Grouseman's yard. But no one believes him. A phone call changes everything and it involves April saying Bud left his jacket at her house. The jacket Mr. Grouseman brought over wasn't Bud's.
121	21	"Revenge is Sweet"	Peter Tewksbury	Paul West	February 26, 1958
Bud tells Jim and Margaret that he helped a man with a flat tire the other day. The man had his daughter and young son with him. When the man wanted to give Bud some money, Bud turned him down. Betty is excited about a date with Allan Wickett, a popular and classy guy at college. She is worried that Bud will embarrass her when he drops by. Allan comes by with his sister Sharon (Carole Wells). Bud and Sharon recognize each other but they cannot remember why. Betty is upset because Bud was working on his car and is a mess. Later, Allan calls and wants Betty to come over for a dinner party. It turns out that Sharon remembered Bud as the guy that fixed her father's flat tire. Mr. Wickett (Frank Albertson) is throwing the dinner party for Bud as a 'thank you' for his help. Betty doesn't want Bud to know the party is for him. Betty tries to teach Bud some social manners and is really hard on him. Bud finds out the party is for him and he threatens to get even with Betty. But, Bud is a perfect gentleman at the party.
122	22	"Country Cousin"	Peter Tewksbury	Paul West	March 5, 1958
Betty's cousin Millie (Susan Oliver) is coming for a visit. Millie is thinking of going to the local junior college. Betty is upset to have to share her room and have a 'country bumpkin' in town. Jim tells Betty she has to help Millie make friends and find her some dates. All the boys Betty talks to want to know what Millie looks like. Betty cannot say as she has never met Millie. The boys say they'll come by to meet Millie and then decide which one will take her to the dance. Millie arrives and the rest of the family thinks she's very nice. Betty still finds Millie to be a "hick' and calls her friend Grace (Beverly Long) to tell her. Joel (Harold Lloyd Jr.), Tommy and Maurie come over to meet Millie. The boys all think she's charming and fight over who will take her to the dance. Jim tells Betty how badly she is acting. Millie accidentally hears Betty insult her, and Betty feels just terrible. This gives Betty a whole new outlook on things.
123	23	"Poor Old Dad"	Peter Tewksbury	Roswell Rogers	March 12, 1958
Jim surprises Bud with a new hunting rifle and promises to take him hunting for the weekend. Bud wonders if they really will go on this trip together, because in the past, their dates were often interrupted by Margaret and the girls. No sooner does Jim give Bud his word when Margaret asks Jim to drive her to visit an ailing relative who lives out of town. Bud makes an observation: women seem to have their men henpecked, especially "Poor Old Dad". Margaret learns about the hunting trip and feels bad. Jim tells her not to worry about it. Bud witnesses Betty talk Jim into typing a report for her. Ralph comes by to pick up Betty to go bowling. Bud tries to tell Ralph how manipulating women can be. Betty comes down and tells Ralph she'd rather go see a movie. A week has gone by and Jim and Margaret are getting tired of Bud's attitude about women. It's the next weekend and Jim and Bud are to go hunting. The water heater breaks and Jim cannot go. Bud tells Jim to go on the trip with his friend Wes Coglan (Bartlett Robinson). Bud will stay home and try and get a plumber. Bud believed that men might be better off by themselves. It is something that Wes says to Jim that makes Bud change his mind. Wes offers to help Jim fix the heater.
124	24	"Betty's Crusade"	Peter Tewksbury	Roswell Rogers	March 19, 1958
The insurance company where Jim works is building a new office for expansion. Jim will be moving to that building. But there's a business on the land. Because improvments were not made, the owner is losing his lease. The building is called Hanno's (Ludwig Stössel). It is a local hangout for Betty's college, and the students love it. The students want to stop the sale and get someone to repair the old building. Not knowing it's Jim's company that wants the land, Betty asks Jim to help her find out who the buyers are. Jim admits it's his company. There aren't that many days left on the lease, but the students make an effort to raise money to get a new roof and other repairs for Hanno. They come up short of the money needed and Betty asks Jim to tell Hanno. When Jim talks to Hanno and sees the history of the place, he decides to help Betty with her crusade. With all the students pitching in, the repairs are made.
125	25	"Young Love"	Peter Tewksbury	Paul West	March 26, 1958
Bernice, a classmate, has a crush on Bud, but he thinks of her as just a friend. Claude tells Bud about a beautiful new cashier at the grocery store named Marion. Bud develops an instant crush on Marion and decides to get a job at the store. That night while doing homework with Bernice, Bud goes on about Marion. While Bud is working bagging groceries, Betty and Margaret come by to check out Marion. Betty mentions to Margaret that Marion is definitely older than Bud. Manager Mr. Wetzler blames Bud for breaking eggs while bagging. Marion stands up for Bud saying she saw the woman drop the bag and break the eggs. Bernice mentions a dance Saturday night, but Bud doesn't ask her to go. Bud decides he'll ask Marion to the dance. Bud has a fantasy about Marion and him dancing together and she tells him how much she likes him. Bud asks Bernice how a guy can tell if a girl likes him. Bud asks Marion to the dance and she tells him she's married. Bud now feels the pangs of unrequited love. But, in the end, Bud comes to realize how special Bernice is.
126	26	"Tell It to Mom"	Peter Tewksbury	Roswell Rogers	April 2, 1958
Betty hides some roller skates in her closet. She doesn't know that Kathy is in the closet as well. Kathy had been playing with some of Betty's clothes. Margaret tells Jim that a friend of hers has a daughter named Evelyn that has been seeing a boy that she doesn't approve of. The mother believes Evelyn meets the boy at a skating rink and has a friend of hers hide the skates. Jim bought a pair of binoculars for Bud's birthday and goes to hide them. Betty confides in Margaret that she is hiding the roller skates for Evelyn. Margaret will not tell Jim as long as Betty stops doing it. From outside, Bud and Kippy see Jim hide something in the basement. Bud winds up breaking the binoculars. Kathy is playing with the skates and gets paint all over them. Bud finds the skates and sells them, hoping to raise money for new binoculars. Kathy confides in Margaret that she ruined the skates Betty hid. Bud confides in Margaret that he broke a pair of binoculars that he saw Jim hide. Evelyn comes by the house. While Betty is looking for the skates, Bud confides to Margaret what happened to them. In front of the family and Evelyn, Margaret reveals everyone's secrets and straightens the whole mess out.
127	27	"A Friend in Need"	Peter Tewksbury	Dorothy Cooper	April 16, 1958
It's the middle of the night and the Anderson door bell rings. It turns out to be a dog. Everyone but Jim wants to bring the dog in and they do. The dog tag reads 'Duchess'. What they don't know is that highly trained Duchess escaped from Prof. van Deering's traveling medicine man show truck when he gets arrested. The Professor is very worried about Duchess, but the police say she'll probably wind up in a dog pound. Jim knows that Duchess is obviously owned by someone who cares very much for her, and tries to find the owner. He puts an ad in the paper. The dog is so well behaved that Jim begins to fall under her spell. Meanwhile, Prof. van Deering gets out of jail and drives around town trying to find her. Someone calls about the dog and the family is thrilled when the person describes a different kind of dog. Duchess hears the music from van Deering's truck and runs to him, much to the sadness of the Anderson's. The next day a policeman comes to the Anderson's door. He says van Deering wants to get a license to sell his medicine, but he needs a reference. The family finds a way to help van Deering.
128	28	"A Medal for Margaret"	Peter Tewksbury	Roswell Rogers	April 23, 1958
Bud has just won 4 awards at the track meet. The family talks about all the medals, ribbons, and plaques they have stored in drawers. They decide to build a trophy case. Everyone has something to give – except Margaret. Margaret's friend Myrtle suggests she takes some lessons and then enter a fly fishing contest. She decides to do it and keeps it a secret from the family. Margaret starts taking lessons with Cliff Wyatt (a real life champion fly caster). Margaret doesn't do too well at first. The family finds out, but doesn't say anything. Margaret continues her lessons and does get better. Cliff thinks she has a chance of winning. The day before the contest, Margaret sprains her arm. To cheer her up, the family performs a version of "This Is Your Life" in her honor. They also give her several homemade trophies. Margaret is surprised when Cliff shows up and gives her a fly rod of her own.
129	29	"The Weaker Sex"	Peter Tewksbury	Paul West	April 30, 1958
With all of Betty's male friends out of town on a geology field trip, she does not have a date for the Founder's Day Picnic. Margaret tells Jim that they have new neighbors, the Kramers. While delivering a note to the Kramers, Jim overhears Marty Kramer, the daughter, tell her friend Alice that she will be able to talk Bud into taking her to the picnic. Jim tells Margaret what he heard Marty say. Bud hears their conversation and says that no female is going to tell him what to do. Marty comes by the house and manages to sweet talk Bud into taking her to the picnic. Bud thinks Betty should ask Marty's brother Don, but she refuses. Jim and Margaret tell Betty to use the same method that Marty did to talk Don into taking her. Margaret wants to go to the dance after the picnic, but Jim thinks he'll be too tired. Louis Kramer, the father, comes by and apologizes for Marty coming over and getting Bud to take her. Not knowing that Mr. Kramer is there, Betty comes back saying how she got Don to ask her. Jim and Louis get a big laugh over what Betty did. When Don comes by, Betty is too embarrassed to go with him. Something Jim says to her makes her feel better. Jim also tells Betty that he'll go to the dance because Margaret really wants to go.
130	30	"Jim, the Answer Man"	Peter Tewksbury	Paul West	May 14, 1958
Jim has a lot of work to complete before he has to leave town for a business trip. While he tries to work, it seems everyone in the family needs just a few minutes of his time. Bud has an adding machine that does not work. Jim tells him to take it apart in the bathtub so he does not lose any of the parts. Betty needs to get wrinkles out of a dress. Jim suggests putting it in a room with a lot of steam. Kathy needs more money to buy costumes for her club play. Jim comes up with an idea to help. The kids keep pestering Jim. Betty doesn't know Bud is in the bathtub working on his machine as he has the shower curtain pulled. She turns on the shower to create some steam. To raise money, Kathy is shining neighbors shoes. As he is about to leave for the train, Kathy has one more major problem for him to solve. She didn't put names with the shoes and doesn't know how to get the right ones back to the people. Jim comes up with a solution.
131	31	"Bud Quits School"	Peter Tewksbury	Paul West	May 21, 1958
Bud and Kippy are to interview Herman Bernard (Stephen Chase), a businessman, for a school project. Betty has been nominated to run for sophomore class president. While doing the interview, the boys learn that Herman never finished high school and yet is a very successful man. Bud believes he can do what Herman did, and would like to quit school and travel to the south seas. Bud tells Jim his idea and Jim is against it. However, Jim will let Bud decide for himself. Bud dreams he's on a tropical island surrounded by native girls. Bud leaves a note for the family saying he's quitting school. When Bud goes to ask Herman for a job, Herman's secretary (Adrienne Marden) subtly convinces him to stay in school. Betty finds out she lost her bid to be class president. Both children come home dejected. Betty and Bud try to cheer each other up. Jim also has a comment that makes Bud feel better.
132	32	"A Matter of Pride"	Peter Tewksbury	Roswell Rogers	June 4, 1958
Bud is voted the most popular boy in school and thinks he has to keep up appearances. He wants new clothes for the upcoming Gay Nineties Awards picnic. Bud talks Jim into giving him money for a special pair of new shoes. The salesman tells Bud that he doesn't have the shoes he wants in his size. Bud buys a pair of shoes that are too small, but he really likes them. Bud's new suit arrives and it's quite unusual. At the picnic, Joyce, the girl he took, has him doing all the events and dances. He gets embarrassed when the shoes hurt his feet. Bud even has to soak them in a nearby pond. It's awards time and the Teacher (Martin Balsam) starts to call out names. Bud and Carol Bostic (Anne Helm), the most popular girl, are the last to be called. Bud is surprised when he is called before Carol. He had his shoes off and now cannot get them back on. When Bud doesn't show up on stage, the Teacher calls Carol. Jim has a solution to the problem. Jim has Kathy take his shoes to Bud. Bud is able to accept his award.
133	33	"Betty Finds a Cause"	Peter Tewksbury	Paul West	June 11, 1958
After attending a lecture at school, Betty is enthused about making a difference in the world. Bud tells the family that he almost got into a car accident by Mr. Rufus Emery's (Basil Ruysdael) house. He has a very high hedge in front of his house that is a blind spot. Betty is trying to find a meaningful cause to help people. Margaret suggests that Betty try to get Mr. Emery to take down his hedge. Betty and Ralph drive by Emery's house and witness two cars almost hit each other. Mrs. Dugan, Emery's housekeeper, comes out of the gate to look at the cars. Betty asks if she could talk to Emery about the hedge. Mrs. Dugan says it will not do any good, people are always asking him. Betty now has her cause. Betty goes to Mr. Emery and states her case, but he doesn't care. Betty is crying at home because she feels a failure. She goes to him for several more days with different tactics to no avail. Disillusioned, Betty finally gives up. What Betty doesn't know is that Mr. Emery enjoyed her company. It's the time Betty usually comes by and Emery is waiting for her. Mr. Emery goes to the Anderson house and tells Betty he doesn't want to see her give up her ideals and agrees to cut the hedges.

=== Season 5 (1958–59) ===
No. overall	No. in season	Title	Directed by	Written by	Original release date
134	1	"Vine Covered Cottage"	Peter Tewksbury	Roswell Rogers	September 15, 1958
Betty's boyfriend Ralph is about to start a great new job and asks Jim for permission to propose to her. Ralph tries to ask her, but there are too many family interruptions and he feels Betty is just not interested. After Ralph leaves, Jim asks Betty what her answer was. Betty doesn't know what Jim is talking about until he says Ralph was going to propose. She feels bad that she didn't give Ralph a chance to say anything. Betty learns from Ralph's mother that he has decided to turn down the job and move to the west coast. Betty finds Ralph at the train station. She apologizes for the way she treated him. Betty convinces Ralph to stay and they consider themselves engaged. Margaret hears from Ralph's mother that they are getting married and looking at a house. While looking at the home, the reality of marriage starts to sink in. They both come to realize that they would ruin a great friendship by getting married. After Jim and Margaret learn of Betty and Ralph's decision, they reminisce about how in love they were when they got married.
135	2	"Be Kind to Bud Week"	Peter Tewksbury	Roswell Rogers	September 22, 1958
Betty has to write a report about a literary figure who benefited from the help of a sibling. This gets Betty to wondering if she should be nicer to Bud. Betty fantasizes about her and Bud walking through the forest looking at flowers. Bud cannot figure out the sudden sweetness from his sister. Betty is even nice to Kathy after Kathy ruins one of her sweaters. Betty hopes to hear about a scholarship she applied for. Margaret asks Betty to babysit for a friends child. Betty has a chance to speak to a Dr. Runeberg (Wendell Holmes) about the scholarship, but it's at the same time she was supposed to babysit. Betty asks her friend Judy (Beverly Long) to fill in babysitting and Judy says OK. Judy's car will not start and she calls Kathy and asks her to let Betty know she cannot babysit. Through a misunderstanding, Bud is asked to help and now he suspects the hidden motive behind Betty's change. Bud doesn't go and causes Betty to miss the interview. Betty thinks that Judy let her down. Kathy tells Betty about Judy's car and that Bud was supposed to fill in. Bud goes out of his way to try and make things right and it involves tracking Dr. Runeberg down at a steam bath. At first Runeberg says there's nothing that can be done. But Bud persists and brings Runeberg to the Anderson house to interview Betty. Henry Kulky as Max. Gregg Barton as Eddie.
136	3	"Kathy's Romance"	Peter Tewksbury	Roswell Rogers	September 29, 1958
Kathy makes a big announcement to the family. She has a boyfriend named Burgess Vale (Richard Eyer). He'll be coming by that evening and Kathy wants the family to make a good impression. Burgess asks Jim a lot of questions. The next time Kathy invites Burgess over, he seems more interested in Jim than her. Kathy is irritated that Jim gets all the attention and Jim is not thrilled that Burgess is constantly bothering him. Kathy asks Margaret if she can have a private birthday party for Burgess. It would be just Kathy and Burgess. Kathy wants to have it on the night Jim will be at the Chamber of Commerce dinner. She doesn't want Jim around. Burgess comes over again and tries on one of Jim's jackets and Jim catches him. At his office, Miss Thomas (Sarah Selby) tells Jim the Commerce dinner was postponed. Burgess shows up at the office and Jim gets annoyed and yells at him. Burgess leaves and not long after Mrs. Vale stops by Jim's office. She thanks him for being so nice to Burgess, as his father is away often. Jim realizes he was hard on Burgess and wants to make amends. Burgess calls Kathy and tells her he will not be coming to the party. Jim goes to talk to Burgess and gets him to come to his party.
137	4	"Voice from the Past"	Peter Tewksbury	Dorothy Cooper	October 6, 1958
Bud notices that everyone always seems to be thrilled when Jim comes home. Bud feels no one cares about him. Bud comes home feeling important because he was nominated the head of the decorating committee for homecoming week. He wants a new approach from other years. He wants to build a satellite rocket on a statue in front of the school. And in the satellite would be the homecoming queen in a bikini. Jim warns him not to be disrespectful of the statue. Bud finds Jim's old school yearbook in the attic. Bud and Betty have a big laugh over a story that said Jim wanted to hold a "Most Kissable Lips" contest. Jim and Margaret witness them laughing. Jim is a little upset and embarrassed. So, Bud decides to go along with his plan. That night, Bud goes to the homecoming rally. Jim and Margaret go sit by the statue and Margaret makes Jim realize why Bud wants to go through with his idea. Bud comes home and tells Jim that he realized Jim was right and Bud voted against his own idea. Bud and Jim come up with a compromise idea. A costume glitch prevents Bud from giving the welcoming speech at the dance, so Jim has to do it.
138	5	"Frank's Family Trees"	Peter Tewksbury	Roswell Rogers	October 13, 1958
Jim is in charge of the Insurance Convention in Springfield. The Anderson's gardener Frank comes by and tells Margaret that he has a vacation from his job. Frank says he has no family to visit, so he will spend his vacation working on the Anderson's yard. Frank overhears Kathy tell Betty she feels sorry he has no one in his life. The next day, Frank does not want Kathy to feel bad, so he makes up a family. Frank says they live here in town. Kathy will give Frank a picture of her family and she wants one of his. Instead of a picture, Frank brings Kathy some presents, but she still wants a picture. The next day, Frank brings Kathy a newspaper picture of four entertainers he claims are part of his family. Meanwhile, Jim is having a hard time organizing the banquet for the convention. It's the day of the banquet and Jim gets a call that the magician who was to be the entertainment is sick. Kathy suggests that Jim try and get Frank's family. Jim begs Frank to talk to them. Frank comes back later and confesses that they aren't his family. Frank feels terrible and Jim and Margaret leave. Frank comes up with an entertainment solution involving the Anderson kids and the evening is a success.
139	6	"Always Plan Ahead"	Peter Tewksbury	Roswell Rogers	October 20, 1958
Weary of their children's last minute crises from poor planning, Jim and Margaret cook up a scheme to return the favor. They tell the children they are going to the State Fair for two days. Of course, Jim knows that all the children already have plans. All the kids ask Jim why he didn't plan this ahead of time. Things backfire when the kids change their plans and can now go. Jim, knowing he has to work, has to find a way to explain how they cannot go. He makes up a story that he couldn't book a hotel and tells Bud and Betty. Again they ask why he didn't plan ahead. Jim also tells them he has to work. Jim goes to tell Kathy, whose friend Gogie Madison is going on the trip with them and is spending the night. Jim cannot bring himself to tell the two girls. Betty tells Jim that a friend of hers that lives near the fair offered her house for the Anderson's to stay at. When Jim sees how much effort the children made planning how to make trip, he decides his work can wait.
140	7	"Second Wedding"	Peter Tewksbury	Paul West	October 27, 1958
Jim and Margaret's anniversary is coming up this Saturday. The children discover that their parents never had a church wedding. Betty prods Jim and Margaret to renew their vows on their anniversary. It will take some doing to get everything organized in a couple days but they decide to do it. Margaret is a little disappointed that Bud is going away for the weekend with Kippy. After talking to Dotty (Yvonne Lime), Betty begins to fear that Jim and Margaret might not want the children around for their wedding. Betty now feels they would want this special time to themselves. Her parents convince her that is not the case. Bud decides to be there as well and will be the best man. The service starts and Betty is Maid of Honor and Kathy is the flower girl. The Preacher goes through the ceremony and then Jim and Margaret drive off.
141	8	"Bud, the Caretaker"	Peter Tewksbury	Roswell Rogers	November 3, 1958
Bud tells the story of how he wound up doing a lot of yard work. A couple weeks ago, he agreed to watch the home of Mr. Whitcomb (John McIntire), a neighbor who is going out of town. He is also given charge of watching Mr. Whitcomb's car. Bud is to start the car every few days and not drive it around town, only down the driveway and back. Bud and Kippy see a pretty new girl walking down the street. Later, Bud is at the end of the driveway in Whitcomb's car. The girl walks by and smiles at Bud. The next day, Kippy and Bud wait in the car for the girl and she comes by. They give the girl a ride in the car. They learn she is just visiting here and has to get back home in Florida for her engagement party. Bud notices a big scratch on the rear of the car. Bud tells us how he spent the next week trying to raise money to have the car repaired with no luck. Whitcomb wires that he's coming home 3 days early. Bud asks Jim for the money. Margaret and Betty go to straighten up Whitcomb's house and he arrives. They try to keep him from going to the garage because the car isn't back yet. Bud and Jim get the car into the garage. Whitcomb notices the car had been repaired. He put the dent there himself and he figures he just forgot that he had it fixed. Bud tells us that he has to do the yard work to pay Jim back even though he didn't damage the car.
142	9	"Betty, the Pioneer Woman"	Peter Tewksbury	Ben Gershman	November 10, 1958
It is time for Springfield's Founder's Day celebration. Betty tells the family that in 1857, Jonas and Agatha Wentworth made a 12 mile trek pulling a cart with their possessions. The Chamber of Commerce wants to recreate the trek that founded their city as part of the celebration. Betty is in charge of the project and has to pick the couple that will make the journey. Betty picks college student Tom Wentworth (Dick York), a direct descendant, to be the guy. When he comes by, Tom is very chauvinistic and condescending of women. He thinks modern women could never handle the journey. The next day, Betty tells Tom she will make the trip. Mr. Jennings (William Schallert), a reporter, comes by to tell Betty he'll be covering the story. It's time for Betty and Tom to start their trip. The trek proves to be more difficult than they anticipated, especially crossing a creek. Tom gives Betty a hard time the whole way. Some men at the finish line joke about a woman making the trip. Tom tells Betty she should just give up. Jennings comes by to check on them and reports back to the crowd they only have a couple miles to go. Tom and Betty are starting to get along when Tom injures his foot. Betty pulls him in the cart the rest of the way by herself. Later, Tom comes by and gives Betty a recipe for humble pie that he'd be glad to eat.
143	10	"Fair Exchange"	Peter Tewksbury	Roswell Rogers	November 17, 1958
The family hosts exchange student Chanthini (Rita Moreno) from India. She will spend a weekend at the Anderson home with her classmate Betty. When meeting Jim, Chanthini thought he was a servant because he was wearing a dish apron. After meeting the rest of the family, Chanthini tells Betty she thinks she made a bad first impression. Chanthini explains to Betty, Kathy and Bud some of the customs of her country. Bud gets embarrassed by something Chanthini does to him and he leaves. Chanthini feels bad. Jim is excited because he got tickets to a football game hoping to take Chanthini. But then he learns she went to a game and didn't enjoy it. Chanthini finds out about the tickets and once again feels awkward. Betty tries to reassure her that everything is fine. Bud does something that makes her feel much better. Chanthini asks Bud to drive her somewhere, but no one else must know. Kathy tells the rest that Bud drove away with Chanthini. Betty thinks she is going back to the dormitory to stay. Betty and Jim go to get her back. They find Bud's car by the park and see Bud teaching Chanthini how to play football. Now that she understands football, she asks Jim if they can go to the game.
144	11	"Bud, the Snob (Flashback)"	William D. Russell	Story by : Roswell Rogers & Paul West, Teleplay by : Roswell Rogers	November 24, 1958
Betty tells Jim and Margaret that a lot of people at school think Bud's a snob. Jim goes to talk to Bud and Bud says he just gets tongue-tied around girls. Jim gives him a bit of a pep talk and Bud says he'll try. At school, Bud asks his friend Claude how to talk to girls. Claude gives him some advice, but things don't go well when he tries to talk to Liz. Back at home, Betty arranges for Virginia to call Bud. But when he gets on the phone, he panics and says good-bye. When a girl scout comes to the door to sell cookies, Bud thinks Betty set it up and he hides in the closet. In the closet he finds Kathy's Halloween mask. He puts it on and now has the confidence to talk to the girl scout. Bud sets up a date with Virginia, but then realizes he cannot go because he cannot wear the mask outside. Bud talks Jim into hosting a masquerade party at home to show his friends he is not a snob. It is the night of the party and the mask goes missing, causing Bud to say he will not join the party. Jim tricks Bud by pretending to draw a mask on his face with makeup. Bud is the hit of the party until he sees himself in a mirror and realizes there is no make-up. But it is not long before he is talking to Virginia and having a good time. Note: The show is told in flashbacks. Most footage is from season one episode 16 also called "Bud the Snob". It includes a new introductory scene and closing scene.
145	12	"Margaret Wins a Car"	Peter Tewksbury	John Elliotte	December 1, 1958
Margaret buys a raffle ticket to help the local orphanage, and wins an expensive car. A mad search for the ticket ensues. When publicity shots are taken, Mr. Griffin (George Mitchell), the orphanage handyman, reprimands Margaret for having so much and not giving more to the orphanage. Turns out the orphanage car will not run, so Margaret volunteers to take the children on a picnic in her car. Betty, Bud and Kathy are very upset because they wanted to take a drive in the car first. Margaret is surprised and ashamed of her children. Mr. Griffin comes by and drops off a purse that Margaret left behind. He tells the three children how lucky they are to have parents like theirs. Meanwhile, Margaret tells Jim that she doesn't care if she ever sees that car again. Feeling ashamed, the children apologize and tell Margaret that Mr. Griffin apologized as well. They suggest to Margaret that they sell the car, buy two cheaper station wagons and give one to the orphanage. Later, Mr. Hodges and the children from the orphanage drive to the Anderson house. They give Margaret a present as a thank you. When Margaret tells them it was really Betty, Bud and Kathy's idea, they agree to make them a present as well. Dennis Holmes as Joey.
146	13	"The Great Experiment"	Peter Tewksbury	Dorothy Cooper	December 8, 1958
Jim attends a meeting of the Kiwanis Club where Dr. Melton's (Philip Bourneuf) topic is to get more out of life and find out what is going on in their world. He becomes enthused and tries to pass this philosophy on to his family. Jim believes that his children are victims of routine and they need to show some genuine curiosity when facing their day-to-day lives. Bud's math teacher, Mr. Paulson, talks to Jim about Bud's lack of interest in class. After a suggestion from Jim, Mr. Paulson finds a way to get Bud and Kippy interested in math and science. Betty has to write an essay on why she appreciates music. Jim suggests Betty go listen to an orchestra rehearse. She gets to the concert hall early and there's no one there. An old man (Vladimir Sokoloff) at the hall gets Betty to hear an orchestra that isn't there. Betty and Bud thank Jim because they both had a wonderful afternoon. Kathy comes in dirty and crying. She says that she's a failure because she didn't have an adventure. Kathy takes her parents to the park where they hear baby Robins. She says that earlier she saw a boy knock the bird nest out of the tree. Kathy put the eggs back in the nest and placed the nest back in the tree. The eggs hatched and she fed them some worms. As the three are standing there, the mother Robin returns. Jim tells her she had the best adventure of all because she saved the birds.
147	14	"The Christmas Story"	William D. Russell	Story by : Roswell Rogers & Paul West; Screenplay by: Roswell Rogers	December 15, 1958
The Anderson's are preparing for the holidays. As they decorate the tree, they recall the story of how they managed to get snow bound in a cabin while going to cut down their own tree. Its Christmas Eve and Jim is upset with his children's materialistic approach to the holiday season. Jim insists the family drive to the mountains to chop down the family Christmas tree. The rest of the family hopes it doesn't take too long. Margaret has presents to deliver and Betty has to dress for a big party that evening. It starts to snow and the rest of the family want to turn back, but Jim keeps going. Their car gets stuck in a snow drift and they need to find a phone. They find a mountain lodge that appears to be closed for the season. Looking through the window they see a phone so they break into the building. The phone isn't working. A man named Nick, apparently the owner, comes in from outside and welcomes the family. Despite the family wanting to get home, Nick insists on cooking them a meal. Kathy is sad because she doesn't think Santa will be able to find them, but Nick says not to worry. Nick and Bud bring in a Christmas tree and the family make decorations for it. Nick finds some things that Jim and Margaret can give the children as Christmas gifts. When ranger Les Turner shows up, the family finds out that Nick is a vagrant and shouldn't be there. Jim talks Les into letting everyone stay and to not let Nick know they know his secret. Meanwhile, Nick put some of his belongings in a bag and is walking outside. Kathy sees him and thinks he's Santa Claus. Les brings Nick back into the lodge and tells him he needs to take care of his guests. Jack Grinnage as Claude. Note: This episode features footage from "The Christmas Story" season 1 episode 12. Wallace Ford appears as Nick (archive footage). William Traylor appears as ranger Les Turner (archive footage). A departure from the usual closing credits, this show plays Christmas-themed music while the credits run.
148	15	"The Basketball Coach"	Peter Tewksbury	Roswell Rogers	December 22, 1958
Bud and Kippy tell Margaret that they got a sponsor for their basketball team. They also got Gif Barnes, who used to play on the University team, to be their coach. But then Bud learns that the coach's work is having him transferred to another town. The team needs a coach to be in the league. Bud suggests to his friends that they ask Jim as he used to play. Jim finally agrees to do it, but Margaret thinks he's too old and it will interfere with his work. After some time, Jim is quite enthusiastic about coaching. But when Barnes returns to town, Bud has to find a way to break the news to his dad. Bud tries but cannot bring himself to tell Jim. Jim suspects something is wrong. Because of a phone call, Jim learns the other coach is back. Bud, Kippy and Ray come back to the house and mention that their sponsor pulled out. Jim comes up with a way to make everyone happy by suggesting his company sponsor the team. And the boys say that Barnes liked what Jim did and wants him for his assistant.
149	16	"Kathy, Girl Executive"	Peter Tewksbury	Roswell Rogers	December 29, 1958
Bud wants to start a family "corporation" to help finance a power mower for his mowing business. Betty and Margaret have chipped in $3 and Bud asks Jim for $47 more. Meanwhile, Kathy's young boyfriend Burgess (Richard Eyer) has given her a locket. She says she'll never take it off. She wants to buy him an expensive present back, but Margaret thinks she shouldn't. Kathy asks Jim for some money, but he doesn't give it to her. After thinking about it more, Jim likes Bud's idea and has the family invest the money. Kathy is voted president of the corporation, over Bud's objections, and is thus in charge of managing the funds. Kathy buys a toy boat as a present for Burgess. That night the family has a corporation meeting. But when Bud expects to be paid his salary and the others want their profits, Kathy must confess that she spent the money on the present. Kathy leaves the others a note saying that she resigns as president and they should sell her locket. Jim gives Bud the locket, but Bud says to give it back to Kathy. In the end, it all works out when Burgess returns the present and it can then be returned for the cash.
150	17	"The Good Samaritan"	Peter Tewksbury	Dorothy Cooper	January 5, 1959
Bud has a school assignment to do a good deed for someone unknown. Bud runs into a Painter (Forrest Taylor) and offers to help him. The Painter wants nothing to do with Bud. Kippy comes by and tells Bud about a family, the Brown's, being evicted from their home. Kippy thinks they should help move the family's furniture into storage. They get to the house and the family isn't there, but the furniture is outside. They load the trailer but Bud's car cannot move it. A man comes by and offers to use his car to haul the trailer. Meanwhile, Margaret learns from Kippy's mother that Mr. Brown doesn't want any help. Things turn into a disaster when the man steals the family's furniture and Bud's car keys. Jim arrives and then Mr. Brown (John Harmon). He wants to know where his furniture is. They go to the police station and luckily the furniture is recovered. Mr. Brown yells at Bud that he doesn't want nor need his help. Jim tells Bud that Mr. Brown's wife is in the hospital and he has seven daughters. Jim would like Bud to find Mr. Brown a job. Bud runs into the Painter again and he apologizes to Bud for the way he acted the other day. Bud and the Painter find a job for Mr. Brown, but Mr. Brown just rebuffs Bud. Eventually Mr. Brown shows up at the Anderson home to apologize. He reveals his wife had another daughter and that he has taken the job Bud helped him to find.
151	18	"The Ideal Father"	Peter Tewksbury	Paul West	January 12, 1959
The Andersons are getting their kitchen repainted by "Uncle" Charlie (Parker Fennelly) the painter. Meanwhile, Jim purchases items for the children that they have been wanting. Margaret reminds Jim that tomorrow is his birthday. Charlie wonders if all the children do is take and not give. The next morning even the Milkman and the Eggman remember Jim's birthday. None of the children remembered Jim's birthday. Betty says it's a special day because of the Spring Formal Ball. Jim and Margaret decide they want to go out that evening. They need someone to babysit Kathy. Margaret gets upset that the other two children cannot help because of their alternative plans and they keep asking for more favors. Betty finds Margaret's birthday card to Jim, and now the children feel horrible. Betty and Bud each say that their plans have changed and they can stay with Kathy. Jim is a little suspicious. Betty admits that they forgot about Jim's birthday and they each apologize. After hearing the children, Charlie volunteers to stay with Kathy and the others can keep their plans.
152	19	"Big Shot Bud"	Peter Tewksbury	Ben Gershman	January 19, 1959
Bud was to have a sweater cleaned for his friend Joyce, but he forgot all about it. Margaret does a favor for Bud by having it cleaned. He wants to give her a thank you gift. He buys perfume using Sunday School money because he knows his boss, Mr. Clark, will pay him later that day. Margaret is very happy to receive the gift. Bud learns the boss is out of town and he needs the money the next morning. Bud tells Betty, but she doesn't have any money. Bud doesn't want the others to find out what happened. Betty lets it slip to Margaret and Jim that Bud needs the money and tells them what happened. Bud gets another job for the day to earn the money, but they cannot pay him right away either. Bud comes home all dejected and Betty finds out why. Jim comes up with a way to help Bud. Jim gives Bud the money and makes up that Mr. Clark gave it to him that morning. Because the amount of money is what Bud took from the Sunday School and not what he's to be paid, Bud figures out what Jim did. Bud appreciates what Jim did and doesn't let him know he figured it out.
153	20	"Hard Luck Leo"	Peter Tewksbury	Roswell Rogers	January 26, 1959
Jim's cousin Leonard (Arthur O'Connell) will be visiting so he can look for a job in Springfield. Jim says that Leonard is known as Hard Luck Leonard because he can never seem to catch a break. Leonard arrives and befriends Kathy. Despite job and apartment leads from the family, nothing seems to works out. Betty comes to believe Leonard doesn't want anything to work out and tells Margaret she wishes he would leave. What was to be a couple day stay now turns into a week. Margaret finally confronts Leonard about no job being good enough for him and he says he's leaving. Kathy tells Leonard she will miss him and he says that no one has ever said that to him. It's been weeks and the family hasn't heard from Leonard. They start to worry if he's OK and Jim suggests calling the police. Bud says he saw Leonard a week ago but promised not to say anything. Leonard was digging a ditch. Leonard comes to the house to tell the family he has a job and found a place to live.
154	21	"Bud, the Campus Romeo"	Peter Tewksbury	John Elliotte	February 2, 1959
While at the malt shop, Bud overhears three girls talking about him, all wanting to ask him to the "Girls Ask Party". He starts thinking he is a real catch and wants to play the odds. He turns down several girls waiting for Sue Hammond, the Prom Queen, to ask him. The girls decide to start an "Anti-Bud Anderson Campaign". Janet Mason (Pamela Lincoln) really wants to go with Bud, but doesn't think he'd be interested in her because she's taller than him. Plus she is feeling the pressure from the other girls. It's the night before the party and Betty tells Bud that Sue wants him to call her. Bud is all excited but it turns out she just wanted Claude's new phone number for a friend of hers. Janet still would like to ask Bud, but she gets more pressure from the other girls. Bud finds out that Janet is interested in him. Bud walks by Janet's house and they spend some time talking. Bud hints at the two of them going to the party, but Janet is still afraid of the other girls and makes an excuse. Janet does call Bud and they go to the party. Once there, the other girls tell Janet she now cannot be a "Pom Pom". Bud comes to her defense and tells the girls that he begged Janet to go with him.
155	22	"Crisis Over a Kiss"	Peter Tewksbury	John Elliotte	February 9, 1959
Bud has been reading a romantic book. Bud is out on a date with Joyce Kendall (Roberta Shore) and tries some of the romantic lines on her. After Bud comes home from the date, he sees Jerry Preston (Ron Ely), one of Betty's boyfriends, trying to kiss Betty against her wishes. He comes to the rescue, but Betty really did not want to be rescued. Betty complains about Bud to Jim and Margaret. The next night, Jerry comes by and Betty introduces the family to him. Jerry makes several compliments about the beautiful women in the family. Bud now tries some of the "romantic man" moves he learned from Jerry on Joyce. Jerry takes Betty to a place called Prospect Point and parks. Bud and Joyce wind up there as well. Neither girl wants to be there. Jerry tries to kiss Betty and she is avoiding his passes. When Betty tries to get out of the car, Bud winds up in another situation where he has to come to Betty's aid. Betty leaves with Bud. Jerry comes over to the house and Jim confronts him about what he did. Jerry tries to explain his actions to Jim and Margaret and feels bad for what happened. Betty and Bud are listening from another part of the house. The next day, Bud apologizes to Joyce for trying those romantic moves. Robert Brubaker appears as Mr. Kendall, Joyce's father.
156	23	"Kathy Grows Up"	Peter Tewksbury	Roswell Rogers	February 16, 1959
Margaret needs to get a babysitter for Kathy and Kathy says she's tired of being treated as a child. The next day, Betty says something to Kathy that makes her feel like a child. Kathy tries to include herself on a bowling date that Bud, Claude and two girls are going on. Kathy then suggests to Betty that her and her friend Burgess double date when Betty and Ralph go to a dance. Betty comes up with an excuse and Kathy feels bad. Betty then says she'll talk to Ralph and maybe they can work something out. Betty and Ralph agree to take Kathy and Burgess to dinner with them, but the plans fall through and Kathy is crushed. Margaret suggests to Jim that he take Kathy to the Club's Annual Affair for the wives instead of her. Once there, Jim and Kathy have a dance together and she believes people are staring at them. Kathy tries an oyster cocktail and that doesn't go well. Mr. and Mrs. Yeager join them. They mention that they took their son to Patty Davis' house for a little party. Patty is Kathy's friend. Kathy asks Jim to take her home. Kathy realizes that the grown up life is maybe not for her just yet. When they get home, Kathy says that Margaret should go back with Jim. Margaret says that Patty called and invited Kathy to the party.
157	24	"A Man of Merit"	Peter Tewksbury	Roswell Rogers	February 23, 1959
Jim hears from his secretary, Miss Thomas, he may be chosen for the Chamber of Commerce's Hall of Merit award. It's between him and Judge Petigrew. The winner will be notified in a telegram by 9 o'clock that evening. Jim will not mention it to the family until it's official. Margaret hears the same information and starts making celebration plans. Jim is excited and starts preparing his acceptance speech. In the evening, everyone waits for word of his being selected. It's almost 9:30 and the doorbell rings, but it turns out to be a magazine salesman. The telegram never comes. After the others have gone to bed, Jim finds a cake and some congratulation signs in the kitchen. He realizes that the family knew about the award. Much later that evening Mr. Kramer, a neighbor, comes by with the telegram. It had been delivered to his house by mistake. Despite the time, the family celebrates.
158	25	"Betty Makes a Choice"	Peter Tewksbury	Peter Tewksbury	March 2, 1959
Betty wants to audition for the lead dance part in a college musical production. All the girls at school are talking about newcomer Esther van Heath and how she's a bit of a loner. Esther is supposed to be a good dancer, though. Betty begins to second guess her dancing ability. School watchman Mr. Gillespie gives her a pep talk. It's time for the auditions and Miss Harris (Miriam Nelson), the woman in charge, announces Esther is first. Esther gives a brilliant performance. Miss Harris then calls Betty, but Betty has left the room. Jim says he'll find her and Jo Ann is called. Jim finds her crying and talks Betty into auditioning, because otherwise she'll never know. Betty gives a stellar performance but Esther wins the part. Back at home, Betty is very disappointed. Even though he has it, Jim claims to have left Betty's purse back at school. He takes Betty to go get it. When they get there, Esther is in the gym practicing. Jim found out that Mr. Gillespie lets her in at night and early in the mornings. Betty wants to tell Esther off, but something Mr. Gillespie says makes Betty feel sorry for her.
159	26	"It's a Small World"	Peter Tewksbury	Dorothy Cooper	March 9, 1959
Margaret tells Mrs. Stockdale (Louise Lorimer) that she'll be able to supply the food for the Woman's Club Charity Luncheon. Jim is asked to be a speaker at an Insurance Convention in New York City and asks Margaret to go with him. Margaret tells Jim the Luncheon is during the same time as his trip. Margaret tries to think of a way to get out of helping at the Luncheon. Mrs. Stockdale learns about Jim's trip. Margaret then feels bad and insists on still helping. While at the hotel, a Marta Evans (Kristine Miller) invites Jim to a party in the next room. He tells her about his family and graciously declines. Mrs. Stockdale finds a way for Margaret to go to New York by making her food ahead of time and then freezing it. Margaret arrives at Jim's hotel, but Jim doesn't know yet that she was coming. Confusion arises as Margaret tries to meet up with Jim. They miss each other at a restaurant. When the Hotel Clerk says that a woman was looking for him, Jim thinks it's Marta. Because it was put in the wrong box, Jim finally gets the telegram saying Margaret was coming. Jim and Margaret finally run into each other. Philip Tonge as Hotel Manager.
160	27	"Two Loves Has Bud"	Peter Tewksbury	Roswell Rogers	March 16, 1959
Betty and Kathy are watching a new family moving in next door. Bud is upset when his girlfriend Joyce (Roberta Shore) breaks up with him. She even returned all his gifts. Bud tells the family he wants to leave town, until he sees Sandra (Jenny Maxwell), the new girl next door. Bud gives Sandra some of the gifts Joyce returned. Things get complicated when Joyce decides that she has made a mistake and wants to get back with Bud. The two girls soon find out that Bud is trying to see both of them at the same time. They demand that Bud make a choice. Bud dreams that he and Joyce are married and she keeps changing her mind about things. He wakes up a decides he'll pick Sandra. He then dreams he's married to Sandra and she keeps wanting to go out after he returns from work. He wakes up again and now doesn't know who to pick. It's the next morning and the girls expect an answer. Margaret comes up with a solution to Bud's problem and he winds up with Joyce.
161	28	"An Extraordinary Woman"	Peter Tewksbury	Dorothy Cooper	March 23, 1959
Jim becomes fascinated by a book sent to him through the mail about a doctor working in Africa. He and Margaret then realize that the book has been written and sent to them by Mary Lou Brown (Constance Ford), an old college friend. Margaret is a little envious and tells Betty she always feels she came in second place to Mary Lou. What they all don't know is that Mary Lou will be visiting Springfield. Margaret and Betty have been working around the house and look quite the mess. Jim suddenly arrives with Mary Lou. The water heater that Margaret had just repaired springs a leak again. Mary Lou is in the middle of a very chaotic situation. Margaret is embarrassed and upset that Jim didn't phone ahead. Margaret gets cleaned up and then goes to talk to Mary Lou. Mary Lou tells Margaret that she always wanted to be like her. Margaret didn't have to prove herself and win to be happy as Mary Lou did. Margaret also learns that Mary Lou was in love with Jim. Mary Lou came to Springfield to see if Jim and her marriage lasted. Mary Lou discovers that Jim and Margaret have the one thing she is missing in her life – a happy home and family.
162	29	"The Art of Romance (Flashback)"	Peter Tewksbury	Paul West	March 30, 1959
Bud has been spending a lot of time at the library. Betty mentions that the High School Prom is next week. Jim and Margaret are surprised Bud hasn't said anything about it. Betty goes to the library and talks to her friend Marge Corbett. Marge says that Bud and her little sister Judy (Joan Freeman) have been sitting at the same table every night that week. Marge says what's funny is, they don't talk to each other and barely look at one another. Betty tells her parents what she saw. Jim tells Bud that he has to take the first step with Judy, but Bud doesn't think Judy likes him. Judy comes by the house to pick up some things from Betty. Judy asks Betty why Bud doesn't like her and Betty gives her some advice. Jim tells Bud that Judy is playing cat-and-mouse with him and Jim lets him know what he should do. Betty overhears this and calls Judy. Both Jim and Betty's advice is starting to backfire with neither Bud nor Judy getting any closer to going to the prom together. Jim is upset when he finds out Betty's been helping Judy. Margaret gives Bud some advice and in the end Judy accepts Bud's invitation to the prom. Elizabeth Harrower as Librarian. Note: This footage is from Season 3 Episode 34.
163	30	"Formula for Happiness"	Peter Tewksbury	Dorothy Cooper	April 6, 1959
It's late at night and Margaret asks Jim about a dream he just had that woke him up. In the strange dream Jim is to give a speech on television that the President will be watching. Jim will be presenting a "formula for happiness" that he has composed. The whole family is in the TV studio. Kathy isn't as excited as the others. Suddenly a mysterious intruder named Charles Barter (Jonathan Harris) invades the TV studio and makes everyone but the Anderson's disappear. Charles doesn't want the world to have the formula and he makes the written formula disappear as well. That's when Jim woke up. Margaret asks Jim what the formula was, but he doesn't know. Jim is baffled about what this dream might mean and why Kathy wasn't talking to him in it. The next day, Kathy annoys Jim while he's trying to read the paper. She says she will not talk to him anymore and leaves. Margaret comes home with the exact hat she was wearing in the dream. Jim starts to feel as though parts of the dream are starting to come true in real life. This includes an actual Charles Barter (Alexander Lockwood) showing up to the house looking for the formula. Jim frightens Charles and he suddenly leaves. At his office, Jim asks Miss Thomas if a Mr. Barter called and she says no. When Jim mentions Barter was looking for an envelope, she says there's one in his safe. Jim checks and the envelope has "Formula For Happiness" written on it. Kathy comes by and says she wrote the formula for a contest that was sponsored by Charles Barter. Kathy says she told Jim about weeks ago but he didn't pay attention. Jim pieces everything together now. Abraham Sofaer as U.N. Diplomat.
164	31	"Bud and the Debutante"	Peter Tewksbury	Paul West	April 13, 1959
Betty tells Jim and Margaret that she saw Bud being driven around by a girl in a sports car. Just then, Bud pulls up in the sports car. He says the car belongs to Molly Quinn (Adrienne Hayes) and he agreed to polish it. Bud says that yesterday his car ran out of gas. Molly passed by and gave him a ride. Betty says that Molly's parents are quite wealthy. Molly asked Bud to go to a theater party that evening and she's paying. Molly comes by and meets the family. After the party, Molly hints that she would like to go out again. Bud hesitates because he doesn't have the money. She says she has tickets to a concert and asks him to go. Jim talks to Bud about not taking advantage of Molly just because her family is rich. Bud says that it is not that, it is just that he cannot afford the places he thinks she will like. Jim tells Bud to be himself and if Molly doesn't want that, then it wasn't meant to be. Bud winds up in an embarrassing situation when he tries to impress Molly and some of her friends. Jim has another talk with Bud. Molly tells Bud that she just wants to be with him and it does not matter what they do or what he can afford. Barbara Woodell as Mrs. Quinn.
165	32	"The Promised Playhouse (Flashback)"	William D. Russell	Story by : Roswell Rogers & Paul West, Teleplay by : Roswell Rogers	April 20, 1959
There's a rodeo coming to town in a couple weeks and Bud and his friends can get in for half price if they come with a parent. Bud asks Jim to promise to take him. Jim says he will not make a promise he might not be able to keep as he might have to work that day. Jim then tells Bud the story of when Kathy had the measles 4 years ago. To get Kathy to take her medicine, Jim promises she can have a playhouse in the back yard. He also promises that he'll eat dinner and sleep with her in it. A month goes by and Jim forgets about the promise. Bud wants Jim to promise to talk to him about a job in a bakery Bud wants. Betty tells Margaret that she wants to break a date with Burt. Jim insists she keep her word and go out with the boy. Margaret wants to cancel an evening with Myrtle and Ed Davis, but Jim says no. Without Jim knowing it, Kathy built a playhouse that day. She now insists he keep his promise to eat dinner and sleep with her in the house. Myrtle and Ed arrive and Ed brought slides from a fishing trip he and Jim went on. Jim goes to says hello to Ed and he hopes Kathy will forget about him, but she doesn't. Jim goes back outside and hopes Kathy will fall asleep soon. Kathy finally falls asleep and Jim brings her in and puts her to bed. Turns out Kathy wasn't really asleep, but she pretended to be because she knew Jim wanted to see Ed's slides. Note: A flashback show about building a playhouse for Kathy and keeping promises, first aired Season 1, Episode 17.
166	33	"The Meanest Professor"	Peter Tewksbury	Roswell Rogers	April 27, 1959
Bud is stuck with having to write an article for the school year book about Professor Stark (Jack Raine), a teacher he doesn't like. Bud decides to right a gag tribute with jokes and insults. Jim stops him from taking it to school in case someone gets a hold of it and prints it. Jim tells Bud to interview a bunch of people to see what they say about Stark. Margaret invites Stark over for dinner this coming Thursday evening. Bud talks to the Janitor (Charles P. Thompson) who says there is no man he has more respect for than Stark. He talks to another man (Hugh Sanders) who says he owes his success in business to Stark. Even Stark's landlady sings his praises. It's Thursday and Stark is there for dinner and the family has a nice conversation with him. Stark accidentally finds the insulting paper Bud had earlier written about him. While everyone else is in other rooms, Stark leaves the house. The next day, Bud finds out that Stark is not as upset about the paper as Bud thought he would be. They shake hands and Bud realizes Stark is not a bad guy. Bart Patton as Freddy. Sue England as Marge, an Office Girl.
167	34	"Live My Own Life (Flashback)"	William D. Russell	Story by: Roswell Rogers & Paul West; Teleplay by: Roswell Rogers	May 4, 1959
A flashback show. When Kathy is tired of being told what to do, Jim tells the story about when Bud was tired of being told what to do by his parents. Flashback to when Bud is tired of being told what to do and wants to live his own life. Jim tells Margaret it is just a phase boys go through. Bud tells his friend Claude (Jack Grinnage) that his parents treat him like a little kid. Jim is overhearing the conversation. Claude tells Bud he should move out and tells him of a place for rent. Bud fantasizes about his family missing him and how hard they try to make him move back. Jim tries to use reverse psychology and tells Bud he should move out. This backfires when Bud decides to go. Margaret is concerned, but Jim does not think Bud will actually leave. But Bud is going and Jim drives him to see Mr. Engel. Mr. Engel is renting the room over his feed store. Jim still doesn't think Bud will go through with the move, but Bud does. Bud almost immediately regrets his decision. Later, Jim is talking to Mr. Engel. Mr. Engel suggests a way for Bud to move home again without hurting anyone's pride. Back to the present, Kathy decides things are fine at home. Note: Most of the footage first aired Season 1, Episode 5.
168	35	"Bud Has a Problem"	Peter Tewksbury	Story by: John Elliotte; Teleplay by: John Elliotte & Roswell Rogers	May 11, 1959
Bud is not doing well in physics this semester in school. He blames Doug Graham (James Douglas), the teacher. Bud tells Jim that Doug hates him. Jim says that Bud either talk to Doug or he will. Bud talks to Doug and Doug says Bud needs to work harder. Doug also asks several questions about Betty. When Doug asks Betty out, Bud asks her to put in a good word about him. Some of the students start joking about how Doug is going to be Bud's brother-in-law. Doug hears about it and is not happy. Doug tells Betty that Bud could pass the class but he needs to work harder. He cannot get through to Bud because Bud resents him so much. Doug and Betty decide to stop seeing each other for a little while. Mr. Armstead (Sam Flint), the principal, talks to Bud about his physics grades. Bud asks about dropping the physics class and taking it in summer school. Doug comes to the house and tells Bud he will not let Bud drop the class and will work with him instead. Bud has a new regard for Doug.
169	36	"The Great Anderson Mystery"	Peter Tewksbury	Roswell Rogers	May 18, 1959
Betty, Bud and Margaret are all entranced in a television mystery show when a tube blows in the back of the TV before the show ends. Bud suggests going over to Kippy's house to watch the end. Jim will not let them because it's storming outside. Jim says that he could figure out who the murderer is. He suggests that the family act out what they have already seen. Kathy will be Jim's assistant. Jim will have 25 minutes to solve the mystery. While they are acting their story out, things suddenly start disappearing and they find open windows. Jim initially thinks the others are doing it. The family starts to believe there may be someone else around and become frightened. The storm outside is getting worse making things even scarier. The lights then go out. They then hear a howling sound. Turns out Kathy was behind everything and she explains how she did it. Kathy says that in the future the family shouldn't ignore her so much. Peter Forster as the Inspector, Hillary Brooke as Mrs. Carter, and Arthur Gould-Porter as Mr. Dawkins, characters in the TV show.
170	37	"Margaret Goes Dancing (Flashback)"	William D. Russell	Roswell Rogers	May 25, 1959
A flashback show. Margaret's friend Myrtle Davis (Vivi Janiss) tells her that she and her husband Ed (Robert Foulk) are taking dance lessons. Myrtle asks Margaret to have her and Jim join them. Margaret doesn't think Jim would be interested. Something the children say makes Margaret decide to take the lessons. Jim comes home and he can tell right away that Margaret is up to something. Margaret tries to trick Jim into the lessons, but he finds out the plan when Ed gives him a call. Jim doesn't want to go and they have a slight argument. Jim goes to the club, where he has a boring time. Margaret goes to the dance lesson, which is a bit too much for her. She leaves the lesson early, claiming she has a headache. Jim comes home and when he finds out Margaret is already home, he serenades her from outside on his banjo. They both realize they liked their life the way it is. Note: Most of the footage first aired Season 1, Episode 11.
171	38	"The Gold Turnip"	Peter Tewksbury	Roswell Rogers	June 1, 1959
Bud is soon to graduate from school. He is annoyed at doing the same activities and ceremonies as every other graduation class. Bud even makes fun of Jim's gold watch that has been handed down to Jim as a tradition. Bud asks Jim for a sports car as a graduation gift. And he says if not that, how about a stereo hi-fi set. Jim shows Kathy the gift he wants to give Bud and it's the watch. At school, a committee is deciding between black robes and maroon ones for graduation. Claude suggests not wearing a robe at all and Bud likes the idea. At home, Margaret and Betty make Bud try on his black robe. Bud says that he refuses to wear a cap and gown at the ceremony. Kathy gives Bud some hints as to what present Jim is giving him. Bud is disappointed when he figures out it's the watch. Bud then decides not to go to the graduation. Mr. Messner (Ed Prentiss), Claude's father, comes by to borrow a camera and tells Jim that these graduations are really for the parents. Bud overhears and decides to go, realizing that there is something to be said for tradition. Before they leave, Jim gives Bud the watch and Bud is actually overcome with emotion. Jim then takes the family outside and shows Bud his new car.

=== Season 6 (1959–60) ===
No. overall	No. in season	Title	Directed by	Written by	Original release date
172	1	"A Day in the Country"	Peter Tewksbury	Roswell Rogers	October 5, 1959
The Andersons are heading up to Lemon Falls for an annual reunion with Margaret's side of the family. Jim and the kids do not like these obligatory get-togethers and they think they are terribly corny. Margaret becomes upset, as it is all too clear what her husband and children think of her family. Jim finds a shortcut on a map they can travel to Margaret's family home. It is a rarely traveled road and their borrowed car breaks down. Jim has to walk several miles to a gas station to get help. Ed (Olin Howland), the gas station attendant, says the service truck is out doing a tow job. It will be quite some time before it gets back. Jim walks back to the car and tells the family how long it will be. It looks as if the Andersons will miss the reunion and Margaret begins to suspect that Jim is just a little bit happy about it. Margaret mentions to Jim that while he was at the gas station, he could've called a station in Lemon Falls and have a truck sent out. Jim feels pretty bad now. A Mrs. Laveer (Claire Du Brey) drives by and agrees to take the family to Lemon Falls while Jim stays behind. It's not long before Margaret comes back with the kids. She didn't want to go to a family reunion if the whole family couldn't go. Just then Ed and the gas station truck show up.
173	2	"Bud Branches Out"	Peter Tewksbury	Roswell Rogers	October 12, 1959
Bud goes to college orientation and signing up for classes is a little confusing. He thinks he walked into his Trigonometry class, but it is actually a French class. Once he sees Miss Luvois (Roxane Berard), the attractive French teacher, he decides to stay in the class. Bud develops a crush on the teacher and thinks she likes him as well. Bud starts to snub his girlfriend Joyce (Roberta Shore). Bud joins Miss Luvois for lunch in the cafeteria. Betty shows up and it makes things awkward for Bud. At home, Betty tells Jim and Margaret about Bud and Miss Luvois. Joyce asks Claude if Bud has another girl. Joyce has Miss Luvois give Bud a note inviting him to dinner. Bud thinks the teacher is inviting him. He tells Claude about the invite and Claude says that Joyce was going to invite Bud to dinner also. The next day, Bud gives Miss Luvois a note with his reply. She gives the romantic note to Joyce. Bud goes to Miss Luvois' house and sees she has a boyfriend. Bud realizes how silly he's been. Joyce, who lives nearby, comes out looking for him because he's late for dinner. After talking to Joyce, he learns she was the one that wrote the note and gets back together with her. Note: Betty's pony tail finally returns in this episode. Betty had short hair beginning in season four in the episode "The Awkward Hero." She is not seen with longer hair again until this one. In an interview Elinor Donahue gave, she states the producers gave her a clip on pony tail that she was able to keep once the series ended.
174	3	"The Gardener's Big Day"	Peter Tewksbury	Roswell Rogers	October 19, 1959
Governor Bradbury is coming to town to dedicate a local park. Jim mentions to the family that he ran into their old gardener Fronk Smith (Natividad Vacío), who applied to do some work for the Parks Department. Fronk comes by the house and says he was chosen as the official greeter to the Governor when he arrives. When Fronk shows up for rehearsal, Charlie Garrett (David White), head of the committee, does not want Fronk since he is Mexican. Garrett was expecting a plain ordinary person named Frank Smith. Jim insists they keep Fronk and guarantees things will be fine. Jim has Fronk rehearse the written speech he is to give, but it doesn't go too well. Jim learns from Fronk that the committee tried to get him to take a trip and they would get someone else for the ceremony. The day of the ceremony, Garrett comes to the house and once again says he does not want Fronk. The family stick up for Fronk. Fronk overhears the whole thing and leaves. Jim has no luck finding Fronk. The kids find him at the last minute and the City Mayor (Ned Wever) introduces Fronk. Fronk gives a different speech than the one planned and the Governor is very moved by it.
175	4	"The Impostor"	Peter Tewksbury	Roswell Rogers	October 26, 1959
Jim mentions to Margaret that his friend Walter Cameron has a son, Tom, that is a lawyer. Tom is moving into the office next to Jim's. Walter would like Jim to help Tom without him knowing about it. Betty returns a defective radio to a store and mistakes a customer for the store owner. She leaves without realizing Tom Cameron (Robert Reed) is a customer. Tom is interested in seeing Betty again, but because of a mistake on the receipt, he thinks her name is Peggy Anderson. The store owner sells Tom a replacement radio, and he takes it to Betty without correcting his identity. She thinks his name is Mr. Ebert. They have nice conversation. Later at work, Jim goes to meet Tom and Tom asks if he has a daughter named Peggy. Tom calls Betty again, but still cannot bring himself to tell her who he really is. He stops calling for about a week. Tom actually asks Miss Thomas (Sarah Selby), Jim's secretary, her advice about what he should do in regards to Betty. Kathy tells Betty the radio is broken again. Betty is happy because it gives her an excuse to call Tom. She calls the store and talks to the real Mr. Ebert and he doesn't know what she's talking about. Tom calls Betty and asks her for a date. Betty gets upset. Jim suggests she get lawyer advice from Tom. She goes, sees Tom and thinks he's faking being a lawyer. Jim learns about Tom's identity problem. Jim finds an elaborate way to straighten everything out with Betty.
176	5	"Bud Plays It Safe"	Peter Tewksbury	John Elliotte	November 2, 1959
Bud tries out for a position on the football team and bemoans the fact that Coach Harper (Lloyd Nolan) does not notice him. Betty tells Bud that Sally, the coach's daughter, likes him. Bud decides to ask Sally on a date as a way to get close to the coach. Jim is not happy about Bud using the girl. Bud's friends Steve and Eileen come by the house. Bud was supposed to double date with them and Eileen's house guest. Bud tells them that he now has a date with Sally that night. Bud goes to pick up Sally and he brings by some clippings about his football playing in high school. Coach doesn't pay attention and just throws them away with some other papers laying around. Bud makes the team and everyone teases him that it was only because of Sally. Eileen tells Sally that Bud is just using her. Sally starts to believe it when Bud avoids her. Bud now feels terrible and Jim says he must confront Sally and tell her the truth. Bud goes to see Sally and tells her the truth and says he's quitting the team. He asks her for a date to go watch the football game. Sally says she'll go, but she'll go to watch him play. Coach was eavesdropping on the conversation and he tells Bud he expects him on the field for the game.
177	6	"Bicycle Trip for Two"	Peter Tewksbury	Roswell Rogers	November 9, 1959
Bud calls Joyce for a date. He wants to take her somewhere different but cannot think of anything. He says where they go will be a surprise. Kathy does an inspection of the house for fire safety. The attic does not pass the test. Jim and Margaret start a clean up and find things from their younger days. They decide to take the same bicycling trip they did when they were teenagers. When Jim looks at the bicycles, all four tires are flat. While going to get tire patches, Betty asks Jim to run a couple errands for her. Jim is trying to fix the bikes and the kitchen sink gets clogged up. Jim is working on the sink and Betty asks him to do something. The Termite Man tells Jim there are termites in the basement. Jim starts to get very irritable and Margaret tells him she doesn't want to go on the bike trip. Bud is with Joyce and still cannot think of somewhere to go. Jim suggests to Bud that he should take Joyce on the bike trip and have a picnic. Bud is surprised when Joyce thinks it's a great idea. Jim gives them the lunch he was to have. Jim tells Margaret that Bud can make a memory of his own.
178	7	"First Disillusionment (Flashback)"	William D. Russell	Roswell Rogers	November 16, 1959
Kathy needs to write a story illustrating a proverb. In flashbacks, Bud tells Kathy about the time he thought about lying to get a job as a stock clerk. Bud wants to apply for a job in a sports department at a local store. His resume has some embellishments, but Jim tells him to only tell the truth. Bud goes to see Mr. Stagg with his application. He does not get the job because his friend Eddie Wardlow (Peter Miles) embellished his resume and was hired. Bud is now upset with Jim, because honesty got him nowhere. A disillusioned Bud even tells Betty it is OK to cheat on a paper she has to write for school. Bud and his friend Joe Phillips want to come up with a way to get Eddie fired. They decide to write a letter to Mr. Stagg saying Eddie is a crook. Margaret senses that the boys are up to something and she takes the letter out of the mailbox. She shows the letter to Jim. Jim tells Margaret that Eddie actually got fired because he is impossible to work with. Jim wants Bud to think that the letter was mailed and see how Bud reacts when he learns Eddie was fired. Jim thinks that Bud's conscience will not let him take the job. Bud goes to see Mr. Stagg, who tells Bud that the store found out that Eddie lied on his resume. Mr. Stagg tells Bud that if Eddie could be deceitful with that, he could be deceitful with other things. Bud also learns that Mr. Stagg has not received the letter yet and he regrets mailing it. That night, Bud confesses to Jim about the letter and how bad he feels about sending it. Jim hands Bud the letter and tells Bud that he has learned a lesson and is wiser for it. Tito Vuolo as Gus the waiter. Note: This footage is from Season 2 Episode 4.
179	8	"Margaret's Old Flame"	Peter Tewksbury	Dorothy Cooper	November 23, 1959
Listening to a radio broadcast of the homecoming gathering, Margaret gets very sentimental about those old days. Jim on the other hand, is happy to be in his comfortable home in the present. The next day, Margaret regrets getting older and remembers their college years, dating, and previous boy- & girl-friends. Jim looks up some of the old girlfriends in his school yearbook to tease Margaret. Jim agrees to go to the dance. Margaret thinks it's to see those girls. Betty tells Margaret that she ran into one of her old boyfriends, Daniel Harrison, at the luncheon. Margaret gets flowers from a mysterious former boyfriend who didn't sign the card. She thinks it may be from Daniel. Meanwhile, Jim is getting a little irritated with Margaret and Betty's constant talk about old boyfriends. Betty then tells Margaret that she ran into another old boyfriend of hers, Fred Archer. Betty thinks he sent the flowers. Margaret calls Mr. Thorne (Lester Vail), the Florist, to try and find out who sent the flowers. He tells her he's not supposed to say. Margaret goes to the store and learns that the person is also sending her a corsage. The corsage arrives and Margaret teases Jim about who sent it. At the homecoming dance, Margaret is supposed to have the first waltz with the mystery man. Jim tells her that it was him that sent the flowers and Margaret says she knew it all along. Jim asks her how can he be sure she knew and she says that will be something for him to think about.
180	9	"Kathy Becomes a Girl"	Peter Tewksbury	John Elliotte	November 30, 1959
Kathy and Errol are wrestling in the backyard and she pins him down. Margaret and Betty ask why Kathy is always playing with boys. Kathy doesn't seem to be getting along with the other girls in junior high. Kathy's friend Patty is having a party and didn't invite her. Margaret tells Kathy that she might want to act more like a girl than she has been. Kathy overhears the family talking about her. She thinks that she is a misfit and that everyone hates her. At school, Kathy tries talking to the other girls. Patty gets upset when Kathy accidentally tears her new dress. Kathy tries to get Errol to ask her to the movies. Patty comes by and makes up with Kathy. Errol then asks Patty if she wants to go to the malt shop. Margaret and Betty want to give Kathy a make-over. Jim plans a surprise party for Kathy and invites a bunch of boys because the girls are going to Patty's party. Jim tells Kathy how to make boys interested in her. Because of her high heels, Kathy sprains her ankle and all the boys fawn over her. Patty and another girl come by as part of a scavenger hunt. Kathy invites them and the other girls at Patty's party to join her and the boys. After everyone leaves, the family finds out Kathy only pretended to sprain her ankle.
181	10	"Bud, the Willing Worker"	Peter Tewksbury	Paul West	December 7, 1959
Bud tries to talk Jim into buying a boat, but Jim says he has to earn his own money to buy it. Meanwhile, Betty is infatuated with Bill Shappard (James Franciscus), a gas station owner. Betty says she'll put in a good word about Bud to Bill. Jim tells Bud he will match dollar for dollar what Bud earns, if he gets a job at the gas station without letting Bill know he is Betty's brother. Bud gets the job on a trial basis, which means Betty has to put dates with Bill on hold. Jim gives Bud some more advice about how to secure the job. Bill continues to ask Betty out and she has to keep stalling him. When Betty sees how hard Bill is making Bud work, she starts to get upset with Bill. Betty even tries to get Jim to tell Bud not to work that hard for nothing. Bud comes home and Jim sees how exhausted he is. Bud asks Jim if he should keep up with the hard work and Jim tells him to decide for himself. The next day Bud goes to the gas station. Bill tells him there's nothing left to do. Bud has worked his way out of the temporary job. Jim, Margaret and Betty drive up and ask about Bud. Bill finds out that Bud is Betty's brother. The family learns that all Bud's hard work paid off because Bill made Bud his assistant manager.
182	11	"Turn the Other Cheek"	Peter Tewksbury	Dorothy Cooper	December 14, 1959
Jim acts as a mentor to Bart Holden, a new young insurance agent, and has him over for dinner. Jim mentions how he's hoping to get Bryant Paige as a client. Bryant is into tropical fish, so Jim has been going to a local aquarium studying the fish. Kathy comes home and the family can tell somethings wrong. Jim finds out that Kathy feels double-crossed by her friend Patty, because she went after Kathy's boyfriend Burgess. The next morning, Kathy wants to get even with Patty but Jim tells her to turn the other cheek. Margaret tells Jim that she found out Bart was double-crossing him by going after Mr. Paige. She also heard that Bart told Paige that Jim's method of selling insurance was old fashioned and out of date. Jim finds it hard to believe. Betty is going on a date with Bart. Betty tells Jim and Margaret that all Bart talked about was money and tropical fish. They spent their whole date at the aquarium. Jim feels sorry for Bart. At first Kathy tells Jim to turn the other cheek, but then she says to fight. Jim confronts Bart and tells him to be more ethical. Jim's code of ethics prevents him from telling Paige what Bart is doing. Kathy once again wants to get even with Patty. Something Jim says makes Kathy change her mind. Because they both turned the other cheek, Jim gets the client and Kathy gets her boyfriend back.
183	12	"Good Joke on Mom"	Peter Tewksbury	Roswell Rogers	December 28, 1959
Margaret gets a letter about a Children's Clinic being built and that she is the General Chairman of the Building Committee. She believes it to be a mistake, but when her family ridicules the idea and her skill, she gets quite upset. Margaret finds out from Myrtle (Vivi Janiss) the reason she was picked was more for publicity, so she decides to accept the job. Myrtle says she will help Margaret fool the family about the job, to teach them a lesson. The family sees a picture of Margaret and the Mayor in the newspaper at the ground breaking for the clinic. Margaret pretends she hired a Mr. Sam Carlson (Howard Petrie) to be the general contractor. Myrtle calls Margaret posing as various people on the project. Things go on for awhile, until Jim runs into Mr. Carlson and finds out Margaret is not running the whole project. Bud sees Margaret at Myrtle's house instead of being at a project meeting. Betty figures Myrtle is in on the ruse and is the one who calls Margaret all the time. Jim tells Bud and Betty that they should play along with the joke for now. Kathy shows Margaret a paper she wrote for school in which she brags about her Mother running the Clinic project. Kathy got into a fight with Jenny, a girl at school who said Kathy made it all up. Jenny and some kids come to the house and she says her mother said Margaret was just a publicity front. Margaret starts to admit that Jenny's mother was right. The family finds a way to make Margaret look very important and Kathy's friends are very impressed.
184	13	"Betty's Double"	Peter Tewksbury	Dorothy Cooper	January 4, 1960
Mildred Parker (Joan Tompkins), Margaret's friend, comes by with some news. Her and Margaret had entered Betty's picture in a lookalike contest to a popular movie star named Donna Stuart. Betty didn't know about it. Mildred shows Margaret a letter that states Betty won. The prize: a trip to Hollywood. Jim is against the idea because Betty didn't really do anything to win except resemble someone. Betty and Margaret arrive in Hollywood and are greeted by publicity man Bert Layne (Judson Pratt). The three go to the movie studio and watch Donna film a scene. Betty and Margaret have lunch with Donna and her co-star Bill (William Joyce). Betty is then dressed up and publicity photos are taken of her. That night she goes to a night club with Margaret and Bill. People mistake her for Donna and ask for autographs. Margaret is surprised when Betty signs them as Donna. An Announcer (Bill Stout) introduces Betty as Donna. A drunk Heckler calls Betty a phony. Betty starts to feel bad that she passed herself off as Donna. Betty is to be interviewed and it will be shown on TV. Jim calls the club to wish her luck and Betty says the interview has been cancelled. She starts crying and tells Jim she will not go on because she's too embarrassed and she's a big phony. Jim tries to calm her down and tells her to just be herself. Betty gives a very humble and touching interview. Geraldine Wall as Heckler's Wife. Bill Idelson as Asst. Director. Rickie Sorensen as Boy. Note: Elinor Donahue plays a dual role as Betty and Donna.
185	14	"Father, the Naturalist (Flashback)"	William D. Russell	Roswell Rogers	January 11, 1960
Kathy must complete a nature folder for a school club by that night in order to be promoted to a higher rank the next day. Teacher Mrs. Davies is not happy about Kathy doing it last minute, but she'll allow it. Kathy says she'll drop the folder off to her tonight. Kathy calls Jim and asks him for his help finding the things she needs, but he says he's to busy at work. Kathy still believes he'll come home. Meanwhile, Betty wants Bud to cut a piece of wood for her, but he says he's too busy. Margaret suggests that Betty help Bud with his chores and then he'll have time to cut the wood. Jim does come home early and doesn't want to get involved with Bud and Betty's problem. Jim and Kathy head outside to explore the woods to find the plants she needs. Kathy accidentally leaves the nature folder out in the forest. The two come home and Jim is exhausted. Kathy realizes the folder is missing and Jim remembers where they left it. Margaret says she'll call Mrs. Davies and explain things. Mrs. Davies says the folders have to be turned into the council. Betty is in the basement trying to cut her wood by herself. She is hoping Bud will hear her and help, but he doesn't. It's the middle of the night and a storm is approaching. Worried that Kathy's folder will be ruined, Jim goes to look for it. In the morning, Kathy is thrilled to see her folder. Bud and Betty learn a lesson about helping other people out. Note: The show is told in flashbacks. Footage is from Season 2 episode 34.
186	15	"Bud Hides Behind a Skirt"	Peter Tewksbury	John Elliotte	January 18, 1960
Bud makes Betty take the rap for his reckless driving, because if he gets another ticket, he will lose his license. Bud tries to talk the Officer out of giving Betty the ticket but it doesn't work. Margaret sees the Officer leaving and wants to know what happened. Betty says she got a ticket. Betty and Bud ask Margaret to not tell Jim about it. Betty learns that she has been elected chairwoman of the Safe Driving Campaign. Betty tells Jim about the ticket. She cannot let the student council learn what happened. To help Betty out, Bud dresses like a girl and goes to the Clerk (Forrest Lewis) to pay the ticket. The council finds out about the ticket anyway and asks Betty to resign. Bud admits to Margaret and Jim that he was the one driving. Bud goes to Judge Jasper Marlin (Larry Gates) to explain what really happened. The Judge doesn't believe Bud and thinks he's just trying to help Betty. Bud says he wouldn't lie to a Judge. Later, the family is before the Judge and he fines Betty for aiding a traffic violator. He informs her that the council is keeping her as chairwoman. The Judge suspends Bud's license and he is to be used by the council as an example.
187	16	"Togetherness"	Peter Tewksbury	Roswell Rogers	January 25, 1960
An insurance magazine is going to interview the Andersons for an article in the magazine. Fred McClure, the magazine editor, happens to be a friend of Jim's. The story will focus on their family unity and solid family life. Mel Buford (Don Keefer), the reporter, will arrive the next morning. When Mel shows up, the family is not displaying much unity. Jim forgot about a golf game with a new client and he has to run off. Mel says he can come by later to see Jim. Betty has to leave and then Margaret as well. Bud has an important call to make and Mel is left with Kathy, but she has to go feed her cat. Mr. Buford makes a second appearance and things are not any better. Margaret invites him to dinner that evening. Bud accidentally destroys some college party decorations. Mel calls McClure and tells him how there is absolutely no unity to the family. Mel suggests writing what he actually saw. Meanwhile, the family gets together to make some new decorations. Mr. Buford comes in and sees the family working together. Mel joins in helping make the decorations. He finally has his story.
188	17	"Second Best"	Peter Tewksbury	Roswell Rogers	February 1, 1960
Betty is upset that she is never the best at anything. Meanwhile, she has been baby-sitting a little boy named Gordon. His parents are away in India and he has been staying with Miss Wickham, his Aunt. Betty decides to take up the sport of fencing. Betty wants to enter an upcoming tournament and come in number one. Betty starts taking lessons and her Fencing Instructor (Ralph Faulkner) can tell she is a novice. He suggests she take up another sport. The tournament is only weeks away and that is not enough time for him to get Betty ready. She insists that he train her. Betty promises Gordon that one night they will camp out in the backyard. Betty's Instructor is very impressed with the progress she's made in such a short time. The night of the tournament, Betty gets a call that Gordon will be leaving in the morning to meet up with his parents. He would like to do the camping get-together now. Betty decides Gordon is more important than the tournament. Betty and Bud, who is in clown makeup, put on a comical fencing show for Gordon and Kathy in the backyard. Gordon had a present for Betty that said "To Betty, my best friend". Betty is happy that she is the best at something.
189	18	"Kathy's Big Deception"	Peter Tewksbury	Paul West	February 8, 1960
It seems that all of Kathy's girlfriends have a boyfriend for the community picnic. She has a crush on George Wilson, one of her classmates, but does not think he likes her. Bud and George's older sister Shirley come by the school to pick them up. George actually likes Kathy, but he cannot think of a way to talk to her. Betty receives some flowers from Don and Kathy wishes a boy would send her flowers. Kathy is in her room crying because she thinks she's ugly. Betty walks in and to save face, Kathy says she had a fight with her boyfriend George. Betty tells the family that Kathy has a boyfriend. Kathy now has to play along with her lie. Bud doesn't believe Kathy. Kathy says that George even asked her to the picnic. Jim thinks they should make the picnic a family day. The kids will brings their dates and all sit together. Bud finds out from George that not only didn't he ask her to the picnic, he's never spoken to her. The family tells Kathy that she better tell George what time they're going to the picnic. Bud catches Kathy pretending to call George. It's the day of the picnic and Kathy is crying in her room. Bud comes in and tries to make Kathy feel better. He says that she should tell the family the truth about George. Kathy is about to confess about her lie when George comes to the door saying he has a date with her. Turns out that Bud called George.
190	19	"Cupid Knows Best"	Peter Tewksbury	Roswell Rogers	February 15, 1960
The Anderson's gardener, Frank, is lonely but is interested in a woman named Elana (Estelita Rodriguez). But he doesn't think she would give him a second look. Betty would like to help Frank, but Jim tells her not to meddle. Frank asks Betty for her help. Elana works at her Mama's (Katina Paxinou) flower shop. Betty decides to help him by writing love letters to her, pretending she is Frank. Frank wants the letters signed Señor Smith. Without Betty knowing, Frank adds a picture of Jim to one of the letters. Jim learns from Frank that Betty has been writing the letters and he's not happy about it. Jim goes to the flower shop and thinking he is Frank, Mama asks him all sorts of questions. When Jim mentions he is married, Mama throws him out of the store. Jim goes home and Betty mentions that shop is where Elana works. Betty then figures out that Frank sent Jim's picture. Frank comes by and apologizes to Jim. He tells the family that he was at the store when Jim came by. Elana was heartbroken. Frank comes out from the back of the store and consoles her. It turns out that she had noticed Frank all the times he dropped off flowers to the store. They decide to get married.
191	20	"The Big Test (Flashback)"	William D. Russell	Roswell Rogers	February 22, 1960
Bud tells Jim that he wants to buy an outboard motor. Betty got a very good report card. Bud grades are not as good. Jim tells Bud that if he brings his D grade in science up to a B, Jim will help him buy the motor. Margaret doesn't think that bribing Bud that way is a good idea. Bud studies a lot for a paper he has to write about an experiment for science class. For once, he knows the material and does very well on the paper. Since this is a change from his previous work, the teacher, Mr. Glover, assumes he must have cheated. Because of this, Mr. Glover only gives Bud a C grade. An even more important test is coming up. One day, Bud asks Mr. Glover if he can stay after class and look over some of Mr. Glover's books. Bud knocks over some papers and picks them up. Mr. Glover comes back in the room catches him with the answers to the test. Through a series of events, the family finds out that Bud may have seen the test questions ahead of time. Before the test, Betty tells Bud that he is suspected of seeing the answers and he better do poorly on the test to prove everyone wrong. Bud gets an almost perfect paper. Mr. Glover, Jim and Margaret confront Bud about the paper. Bud says he didn't look at the test answers, he did well because he studied. Jim finds a way to prove Bud didn't cheat. Note: The show is told in flashbacks. Most footage is from Season 2 episode 9. It includes a new introductory scene and closing scene.
192	21	"Jim's Big Surprise"	Peter Tewksbury	Dorothy Cooper	February 29, 1960
Jim tells the family to be home at 4:00 for a big surprise. Everyone wonders what it could be. As Betty leaves for the library, Jim is watching a show about Hawaii on TV. Margaret is about to start doing some housework and Jim says she should think about getting some help. Later, Bud sees Jim driving a convertible. Kathy is at the pool having diving lessons. Miss Abrams (Marion Ross), Kathy's swimming teacher, mentions to her that Jim was by asking questions about the pool. It's almost 4:00 and Margaret, Bud and Betty hint to Jim that they know what the surprise is. Bud mentions the convertible and Jim said he borrowed that while his car was being serviced. Betty thinks it's a trip to Hawaii, but Jim says that's not it. Kathy comes in and says they're getting a pool. Jim senses everyone's disappointment. It turns out the surprise is that Jim is to be given the Gold Key Award from the Chamber of Commerce for being Father of the Year. The kids feel bad for not being more excited about Jim's surprise. He tells the children he cannot give them those things because he wants to give them a college education. Jim tells Margaret that he wishes he never mention a surprise to the kids. Margaret confesses she thought she was getting a maid. Jim and Margaret are about to leave for the ceremony. The family each find a way to make it up to Jim.
193	22	"Time to Retire"	Peter Tewksbury	John Elliotte	March 7, 1960
Bud is painting his car and would like some money. Jim tells him to get a job. Bud asks Jim to hire him part time at the insurance office. Jim tells him to start at someone elses office. Jim mentions that he got a memo from the home office about Arthur Higgins (Charlie Ruggles), a co-worker in the insurance company. Jim has to tell Arthur that he has to retire as he will reach retirement age the next day. Jim suggests inviting Arthur over for a birthday dinner and he'll tell Arthur then. That night Arthur arrives and he is full of energy. Jim is about to tell Arthur the bad news when the family brings in a birthday cake. They then give him presents and Arthur is quite moved. Jim cannot bring himself to tell Arthur that evening. The next morning, Jim's secretary Miss Thomas asks Arthur how his retirement party went, not knowing Jim didn't mention it. She shows him the memo. Arthur then goes missing. Bud finds him at his cabin in the woods and tries to convince him that he is still useful. Arthur and Bud come back to the Anderson house. Jim asks Arthur to come back to the office as a consultant. Arthur tells Jim that he is opening up his own office and Bud is coming to work for him.
194	23	"Bud, the Speculator"	Peter Tewksbury	Paul West	March 14, 1960
Bud hopes to sell a bunch of his stuff to Eddie for $50. He tells Eddie about some stock in a new copper mine company that he wants to buy. Eddie now decides to buy the stock. Bud begs Jim to lend him the $50 and tells him about the stock. Bud will pay Jim back in two weeks. The others in the family thinks it might not be a good investment. Meanwhile, Betty has been saving money to buy a new dress. She puts on a fashion show for Jim and Margaret. Betty has to decide between 3 dresses. After two weeks, Bud has tripled his money. Jim advises Bud to sell the stock and take his profit. When Bud goes to the company office to sell his stock, he finds that they have moved out. Bud is told by a moving man that the company owed 3 months rent and didn't pay the phone bill, the light bill or for the furniture. Bud now needs to find a way to pay Jim back on time. Betty offers to loan him the money, but he says he must get out of his problem on his own. Eddie comes by and offers Bud $45 for the items he was going to buy before. What Bud doesn't know is that was Betty's money and she had Eddie play along. Jim says he'll buy Betty the dress she wanted. Eddie Foy III as Delivery Boy.
195	24	"The $500 Letter"	Peter Tewksbury	Roswell Rogers	March 21, 1960
The Andersons receive a $500 check in the mail. Mr. Kroegman, a former neighbor, wants to thank an Anderson for a kindness done to him once several years ago. The only thing is, his letter cuts off just as he is about to say which of the Andersons did the good deed and what it was. The family tries to remember who might have done a favor for him, and what the favor was. Kathy remembers being sent to the Principal's office for chewing gum in class. Mr. Kroegman was there and, while waiting for the Principal, she sat next to him. She gave him some gum and he was very grateful. Betty remembers Bud and she were walking home and Kroegman was walking in front of them. Kroegman slipped on something, fell down and dropped his bag of groceries. She asked if he's OK and then offers to replace the eggs that were broken. Betty helps him up and walks him to his apartment. Later, Bud tells Jim and Margaret basically the same story Betty told except he was the one that helped Kroegman. They tell Bud how that was the same story Betty told. Margaret tells Jim about how she once supported a suggestion Kroegman made about the school cafeteria. Jim tells her that he found out that Kroegman, who was the janitor at the school at the time, was fired for stealing. Jim is tired of the way everyone is acting. He says they shouldn't be paid for doing a kindness. Jim wants everyone to write down why they think they should get the money and vote on the best. When reading the papers, no one really has a valid claim to the money. Just then a special delivery letter arrives from Kroegman with the missing pages of the original letter. Kroegman says that he just learned he was falsely accused of stealing back then and is working to clear his name. While waiting for his final check from the Principal, it was Kathy's friendship that got him through it.
196	25	"Adopted Daughter (Flashback)"	William D. Russell	Story by: Roswell Rogers and Carl Herzinger; Teleplay by: Roswell Rogers	March 28, 1960
Kathy reminisces with Mother and Bud about the time she once thought she was adopted. Patty Davis tells Kathy that fellow classmate Alicia May is adopted. Patty says that one way to prove one was not adopted is by a birth certificate. She asks Kathy if she has seen her certificate. Kathy goes home and searches for the certificate. When Margaret says it was lost, Kathy begins to worry. Kathy asks Jim about her birth and Jim jokes and makes up a story of her being left by the milkman. Kathy tells Patty that she believes she is adopted. Kathy finds a receipt from an adoption agency and is sure it refers to her. Margaret mentions to Jim how strangely Kathy's been acting. Bud starts taking Kathy's stuff out of her room. Jim tries to tell Kathy that it is only for a couple days as they are sanding and varnishing her floor. Believing that the family is going to kick her out, Kathy runs away. She goes to Alicia May's house and tells her she is adopted as well. Alicia May tells Kathy that adopted children are special, because they were chosen. Alicia May convinces her to go back to her family. The family finds out from Patty that Kathy thinks she's adopted. Jim finds Kathy and reassures her she is part of the family. Note: The show is told in flashbacks. Most of the footage first aired Season 2, Episode 36. It includes a new introductory scene and closing scene.
197	26	"Family Contest"	Peter Tewksbury	Story By: John Elliotte; Teleplay By: John Elliotte & Roswell Rogers	April 4, 1960
Hoping to win a free trip to Hawaii, the Andersons enter a family-photo contest. They want to pose around the barbecue, but they have no one to take the picture. Baker Mr. Henslee (Stuart Erwin) comes by and Betty asks him to take the picture. Henslee mentions that it's his and his wife Amie's (Hanna Hertelendy) anniversary. He wonders if Betty could take a picture of them. That night, Jim and Betty come to the Henslee house and Betty takes the picture. Jim and Betty are introduced to the Henslee's children which includes an adopted Korean boy named Toby (Warren Hsieh). Betty then takes a picture of the whole family. Jim thinks the Henslee's should enter the contest as well. Betty shows her family the picture of the Henslee family and it's very good. Jim says that Henslee wasn't going to enter the contest because he couldn't get away from the bakery. But then Jim gets a call from Henslee who says his children want him to enter. Kathy, thinking that the Henslee's are sure to win, tears up the picture. The next morning, Henslee comes by to pick up the picture as it has to be turned in by that day. Margaret cannot find the picture and asks Henslee to come back later. Henslee comes back. While everyone else is looking for the picture, Kathy hides from the family. She goes outside and sees Toby in the bakery truck. Kathy feels horrible and confesses to Betty. Kathy gives Betty the negative she hid. Betty is able to make another print of the picture in time to enter the contest. The Henslee's win the contest.
198	27	"Love and Learn"	Peter Tewksbury	Roswell Rogers	April 11, 1960
Margaret is concerned about Bud's grades in English. Bud resists his mother's plea for him to boost his grade by being tutored after school. But, he changes his mind when he learns that one of the available student-tutors is Nelda Freemont (Diana Millay), a good looking girl he's interested in. When Nelda arrives, Jim and Margaret now understand why Bud changed his mind. Margaret hopes Bud can keep his mind on his work. Bud keeps trying to romance Nelda, but she keeps the sessions on a professional level. She is very strict with Bud and insists he work hard. Something Nelda does at school embarrasses Bud in front of his friends. Frustrated that he isn't getting anywhere with Nelda, Bud suggests to Jim and Margaret that they find another tutor. The next day, Betty tells Bud that Nelda cannot make tonight's session as she has a meeting. Betty says that Nelda is coming over now. Bud was to go bowling with his friends and he says he's still going. Nelda comes by and she tells Jim she's afraid that she's not being any help to Bud. Jim comes up with a plan for Bud and Nelda to see eye to eye. Jim takes Betty, Nelda and Margaret to the bowling alley. Jim tries to show Nelda how to bowl. Bud makes a few comments how Jim's going it wrong. Jim suggests that Bud teach Nelda. Bud enjoys being the one to give instructions and he and Nelda come to an understanding.
199	28	"Blind Date"	Peter Tewksbury	Paul West	April 18, 1960
Rudy Kissler (Hampton Fancher) is a waiter at the soda shop and he is a bit clumsy. Betty is embarrassed when her friends make fun of Rudy because they think he is inferior to them. She chastises her friends and leaves the soda shop. Meanwhile, Betty learns she is a finalist for the Campus Queen Contest. Her friends decide to play a joke on Betty by setting her up on a blind date with Rudy. Betty is actually excited about meeting the mystery man. At the party, Betty is surprised and disappointed when Rudy shows up. But she is polite to him. At the end of the evening, Rudy takes Betty home and says what a nice time he had. Betty decides to get even with her friends by bringing Rudy to every function at the school. Betty's friend Judy Clauson (Beverly Long) tells her that she is ruining her chances to win the contest by having Rudy around. Rudy tells Betty he loves her and Betty feels horrible for leading him on. Betty tells Jim what she did. To make matters worse, Bud tells Betty that her friends told Rudy that it was all a joke. Betty apologizes to Rudy and says she values his friendship. She wants Rudy to go with her to the Campus Queen Dance, but he says they should just leave things the way they are. After she is crowned Campus Queen, Betty asks Rudy for the first dance.
200	29	"Betty's Career Problem"	Peter Tewksbury	John Elliotte	April 25, 1960
Jim and Margaret talk about Betty graduating from college soon and how time has flown by. Margaret hopes she wins the Scholastic Achievement Award. Jim mentions all the other honors Betty's won. Betty has a nightmare about not winning the award. She tells the family about the dream and how the person that stole the award away from her looked like classmate Cliff Bowman (Jim Hutton). Bud mentions how Cliff actually beat out Betty for other awards. That night, Cliff, who is an achiever like Betty, wins the award. Cliff comes by the house and tells Betty he has the feeling that she doesn't like him. He says the only reason he won is because she was so smart and he had to work extra hard. He invites Betty to dinner to make it up to her. Betty is furious and kicks Cliff out of the house. Betty has an appointment with Mr. Kimbrough from Gorman's Dept. Store about the assistant merchandise buyer job. Cliff comes by because he's applying for the same job. Mr. Kimbrough hears the two bickering with each other and he cannot promise either of them the job. Kimbrough offers Cliff a starting job in the stock room. He offers Betty a job as a model for the weekend fashion shows. They would still have a chance at the buyer's job. While at work, the bickering between the two continues and Cliff tells Betty how much he likes her. At the fashion show, Betty models a wedding dress. Just then, Cliff comes out as the groom. Betty tells him that she quit wanting the buyer job and that she's starting to like him.
201	30	"Bud Lives It Up"	Peter Tewksbury	Alfred Lewis Levitt & Helen Levitt as Tom & Helen August	May 9, 1960
Bud has been having a nice time with Nancy Millbrook from Chicago, who's been visiting her Aunt. She's leaving the next day and Bud implies that he'll be coming to Chicago soon. Bud now has to find a way to get there. Bud is able to join the University debating team just in time for a trip there. In Chicago, Bud learns that he can simply sign for his hotel expenses while representing the University. Bud asks Nancy to join him that evening at the hotel's upscale restaurant and nightspot. She already had a date, but he talks her into it. Bud has now been home for a couple days. Betty tells the family that she heard from Ed Newell, one of the guys on the debate team, that one of the team members ran up a bill in excess of $185. Ed wouldn't say who it was. Bud learns that the University is denying payment on his tab and that his debate team may never be invited again. His debate teammates advise him that he will likely be expelled unless he is able to find a way to pay the bill himself. After a suggestion from the teammates, Bud decides to sell his car. Bud confides to Jim about his problem and Jim is disappointed that Bud let himself get into that situation. The two work out a solution. Skip Young as George Allison.
202	31	"Not His Type"	Peter Tewksbury	Story By: John Elliotte; Teleplay By: John Elliotte & Roswell Rogers	May 16, 1960
Diane's (Diana Millay) boyfriend George Frazier (Carleton Carpenter) starts to take an interest in Betty. Diane tells Betty that she thinks George may be after someone else. She asks Betty to maybe keep an eye on George. George finally asks Betty out. He feels Diane is too domineering and has his whole life planned out for him. Betty does like George, but because Diane is her best friend, she turns him down. Diane tells Betty that George broke up with her, but he wouldn't admit there was another girl. Diane describes the kind of girl that George may have fallen for and it's nothing like Betty. Not knowing that George asked Betty earlier, Diane suggests that maybe Betty go out with him so he would get things out of his system. Diane knows that Betty's not his type and she could trust Betty. Betty doesn't say it, but she kind of resents that Diane doesn't think George could fall for her. Betty at first does not want to come between Diane and George. But after he asks her again, she agrees to go out with him. While on their date, both George and Betty come to realize that George should be with Diane. Betty tells George that he just needs to assert himself a little more with Diane.
203	32	"Betty's Graduation (Flashback)"	William D. Russell	Roswell Rogers	May 23, 1960
Jim discusses a letter from Kathy's school where they report Kathy is not passing her math class. Kathy tells her father that she is not really wanting to graduate from junior high school as it is the happiest time of her life. Jim recalls the story of when Betty didn't want to graduate from high school. Flashback to Bud wearing Betty's dress while Margaret works on it and Betty practicing her graduation speech. A corsage from Ralph is delivered for Betty and she starts to cry. Jim has a talk with Betty and she seems fine, but he still thinks somethings wrong. Kathy finds Margaret's diary and starts to read it to Jim. Margaret takes it away from her. Ralph calls and Betty says that she's not going to the graduation dance that evening. Betty tells her parents that she doesn't want to go as this is the last dance and there will never be another. Betty starts to think the best days of her life are now over and does not want to graduate. Later, the family cannot find Betty. Betty calls and tells Jim she took a cab to an old grove she used to go to when she was younger and wanted to think things through. Jim drives out to see her. With the help of Margaret's diary, Jim convinces Betty that the best things are ahead for her. At the graduation ceremony, Mr. Armstead (Sam Flint) introduces valedictorian Betty. As part of her speech, she repeats something Jim told her at the grove. Note: The show is told in flashbacks. Most footage is from Season 2 episode 37. It includes a new introductory scene and closing scene.
