= Claudia (play) =

1941 play by Rose Franken

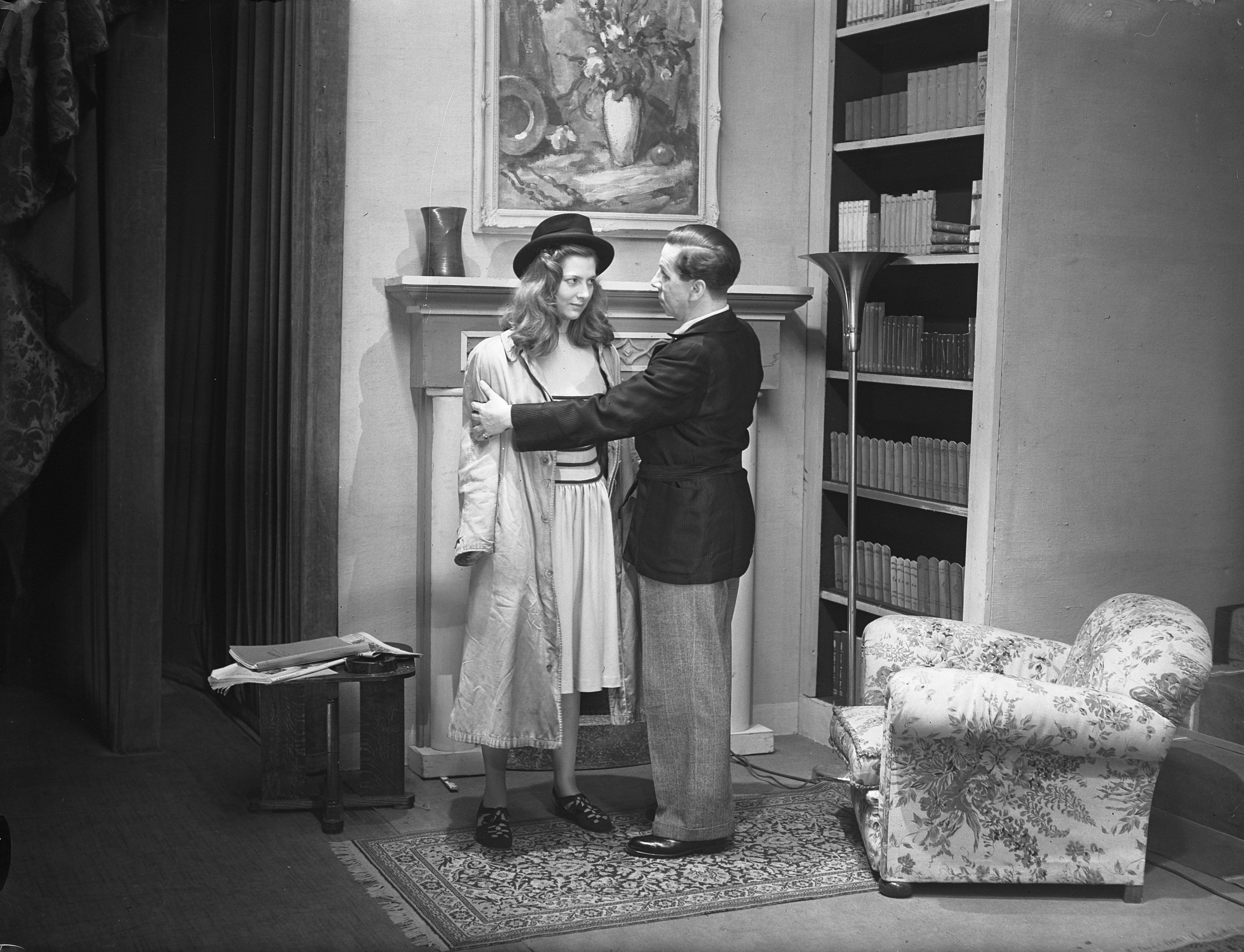
Claudia from Claudia

Claudia, a story about the titular wife's maturation, is a 1941 play by Rose Franken.

== Broadway play ==
Claudia, based on Franken's 1939 novel, premiered as a play on Broadway in 1941. The play was written and directed by Rose Franken and produced by John Golden. The show starred Dorothy McGuire as Claudia Naughton and Donald Cook as David Naughton. When it closed in 1943, it had run for a total of 722 performances.

== Books ==
Franken's Claudia: The Story of a Marriage was released in 1939, the first in a series of books which would be followed by Another Claudia (1943), Young Claudia (1946), The Marriage of Claudia (1948), From Claudia to David (1949), two 1952 novels, and a 1958 omnibus edition called The Complete Book of Claudia. The Claudia series explored the challenges and delights of family relationships that foster personal growth.

== Films ==
Claudia was first made into a film, Claudia (1943), followed by Claudia and David in 1946.

== Television ==
In January 1952, NBC-TV premiered a series based on Claudia, The Story of a Marriage.

== Radio ==
The play was first adapted for radio in a segment on the June 6, 1941, episode of The Kate Smith Hour. When Smith's program went off the air for the summer, a 30-minute version, Claudia and David, filled her time slot.

In 1949, the British Broadcasting Corporation presented two 90-minute productions of Claudia.
