= Claudia (American TV series) =

American TV situation comedy (1952)

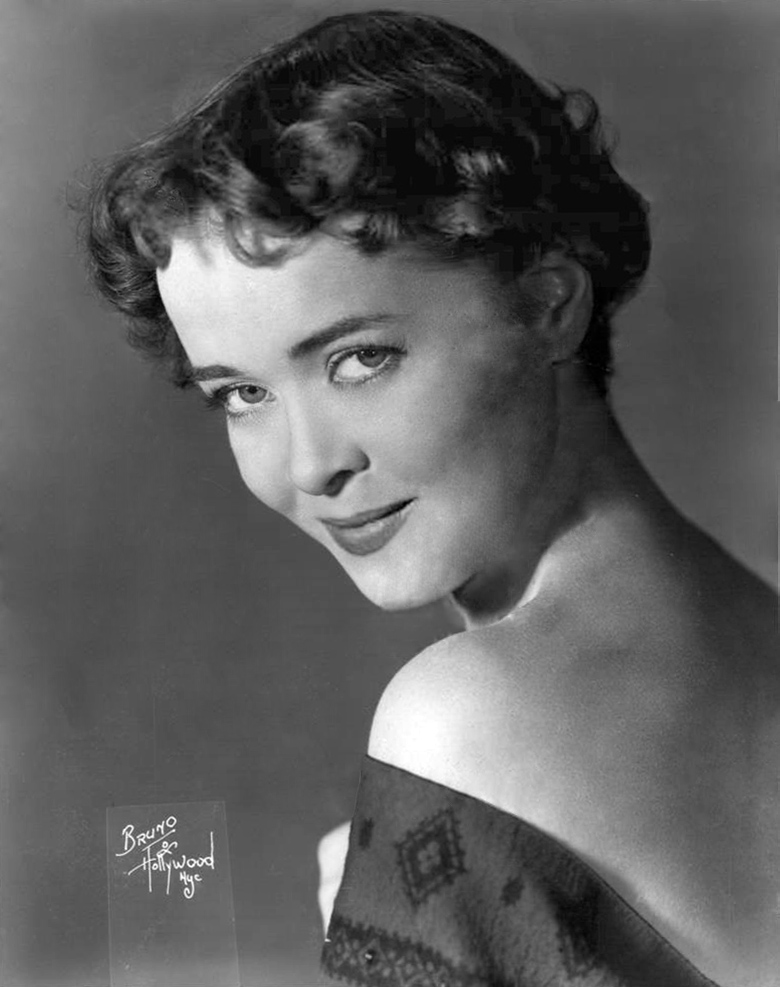
Joan McCracken portrayed Claudia Brown in Claudia.

Claudia (also known as Claudia, the Story of a Marriage) is an American television program that was broadcast live on NBC January 6, 1952 - March 23, 1952 and on CBS March 31, 1952 - June 30, 1952. The situation comedy was based on Rose Franken's short stories and novels about a young woman's romance.

== Premise ==
At age 18, Claudia Brown, a somewhat naive teenage girl, married David Naughton, an architect. Adapted from the radio series Claudia and David, episodes focused on their lives, especially Claudia's struggles as she adjusted to married life. The concept was also adapted into the Broadway play Claudia (1941) and the films Claudia (1943) and Claudia and David (1946). In addition to Claudia and David, story lines involved David's brother and sister (Harley and Julia) and Claudia's mother (Mrs. Brown).

== Cast ==
The program's actors and the characters that they portrayed are shown in the table below.

Actor	Character
Joan McCracken	Claudia Naughton
Hugh Reilly	David Naughton
Margaret Wycherly	Mrs. Brown
Faith Brook; Dora Sayers	Julia Naughton
Alex Clark; William Post, Jr.	Harley Naughton
Paul Andor	Fritz
Mercer McCloud	Roger

Source: Encyclopedia of Television Shows, 1925 through 2010, except as noted.

== Production ==
When the series was on CBS, it originated from WCBS and was sponsored by Swansdown cake mixes and Instant Maxwell House coffee. Carol Irwin was the producer, and William Brown Meloney was the director. Dougherty Brown wrote the scripts, which were based on Franken's stories. It was broadcast on Mondays from 9:30 to 10 p.m. Eastern Time.

== Attempted revival ==
In 1956, Franken tried to launch a new version of the program. Several entities showed interest in the project, and two pilot episodes were made, but the efforts were unsuccessful.
