= John Swope =

John Swope may refer to:

- John Swope (photographer) (1908–1979), photographer for Life Magazine
- John Augustus Swope (1827–1910), Democratic member of the U.S. House of Representatives from Pennsylvania
