= Blowing Smoke Rings =

1938 painting by Isabel Bishop

- Artist: Isabel Bishop
- Year: 1938
- Medium: Oil on panel
- Dimensions: 51.1 cm × 35.9 cm (20.1 in × 14.1 in)
- Location: Memorial Art Gallery, Rochester, New York

Blowing Smoke Rings is an oil on panel painting by Isabel Bishop (March 3, 1902 - February 19, 1988), created in 1938. Measuring 20 1/8 inches by 14 1/8 inches (51.1 x 35.9 cm). The painting depicts a young female office worker residing in the Union Square neighborhood, taking a brief smoke break.

== Description ==
The subject of the piece is a young female office worker held in a private and contemplative moment. She sits in a relaxed posture, body slightly turned as she leans back with her head tilted upward. She holds a cigarette near her face, lips pursed in the conscious act of blowing smoke rings into the air. Her eyes gaze upwards, intently watching the smoke rings she creates, absorbed in the playful act.

Like many of Bishop's subjects from this time, the figure appears to be one of the numerous female office workers who resided in the Union Square neighborhood where Bishop's studio was located from 1926 until 1984. These women are often the daughters of working-class or immigrant families who found employment in insurance companies, banks, and small offices that employed nearly ten thousand clerical workers in the district.

Therefore, the figure's appearance aligns with Bishop's characteristic approach to depicting average working women, portraying them as individuals rather than stereotypes. Going against the stereotypical blond bombshells depicted by her contemporary Reginald Marsh, Bishop instead presented her subjects with restraint and dignity, emphasizing their professionalism and everyday reality rather than their sexuality. The conservative clothing the female worker is presented in, the dark green skirt and a light-colored blouse, reflects the modest attire expected from female office workers during this period.

The act of smoking in the piece captures an intimate moment of both psychological and physical release. Capturing a private moment away from work, the female worker momentarily escapes everyday workday constraints and demands.

== Education ==
Isabel Bishop began her art education at the ripe age of 12, attending Saturday morning life drawing classes at the John Wicker Art School located in Detroit. She then graduated from high school in 1918 at the age of 15 and proceeded to continue her studies at the John Wicker's Art School in Detroit, Michigan. In that same year, she moved to New York City at the age of 16 to attend the New York School of Applied Design for Women. Roughly around 1920, when she was 18, she attended the Art Studies League, changing her focus to painting rather than illustration, and stayed there until 1924. During her time at the Art Students League, Bishop trained under Guy Pene du Bois and Kenneth Hayes Miller, whose teachings significantly shaped her approach to painting and taught her methods, shaped by Baroque Flemish painting techniques regarding compositional structure and anatomy. Expanding her practice through study and painting sessions in Woodstock, New York. Furthermore, she gained significant insight from prominent early modernists such as Max Weber and Robert Henri during this time. This mentorship with Miller lasted about five years and shaped her realist approach to modern urban life.

In 1928, Bishop travelled to Europe, visiting major art museums and studying the work of Rembrandt and Rubens, whose positioning of the human body deeply influenced her own work. This independent study reinforces her lifelong interest in the mobility and vitality of the human form. Shortly after this independent study, she continued her professional studies by attending the Yale University School of Fine Arts in 1963 to expand her technical knowledge and engage with newer art discourses.

== Technique ==
Bishop fully developed and established her painting style during the 1920s to the 1930s, where her work predominantly was composed of working women going about their daily routines on the streets of Manhattan. During this time, being deeply influenced by Peter Paul Rubens and other Dutch painters, whom she was exposed to during her trips to Europe, Bishop incorporated their techniques into her own modern urban pieces.

Beginning in 1932, Bishop regularly exhibited her work at the Midtown Galleries, gaining recognition for her unique approach to form and motion. During this time, she regularly worked from her loft studio near Union Square West Fourteenth Street, where she explored what she called "unfixity", which stands for movement and the impermanence in everyday life. Her compositions being composed and characterized by the careful positioning of the human form and give emphasis to the expressiveness of the face. Her artistic style evolved further during the post-war years towards a more abstract depiction of New Yorkers in movement and transit throughout the city streets.

== Exhibitions ==
Although Blowing Smoke Rings currently resides in the Memorial Art Gallery (MAG) in Rochester, NY, it has been featured in numerous exhibitions. Having recently been on view in the Schoelkopf Gallery exhibition, American Stories: The Kathleen Kennedy and Frank Marshall Collection (2025) in New York City. Prior to this exhibition, it was a part of both the Isabel Bishop exhibition at the National Museum of Women in the Arts (NMWA) in Washington, D.C., from July 24 through September 9 of 1990. And the Isabel Bishop Retrospective exhibition at the University of Arizona Museum of Art from January 9 to February 3 of 1974.

== Provenance ==
Belonged to the artist until March 1943, when it was sold to Midtown Galleries, NY. After that, it was sold to Charles K. Feldman, whose ex-wife, Jean Howard, possessed it after the divorce. Later, it was acquired by the American Contemporary Art (ACA) Gallery in New York, which then lent it to a private collection before promptly returning to the ACA Galleries. In 1996, it was in the possession of the Guggenheim Asher Associates and was then held in a private collection until it was bought in 2024 by the Gallery through the Schoelkopf Gallery, and currently resides in the Memorial Art Gallery (MAG).

== Bibliography ==
- Bishop, I. (1974). Isabel bishop: First retrospective exhibition. University of Arizona Museum of Art.
- Ellett, Mary Sweeney. "Isabel Bishop-The Endless Search." Ph.D diss. University of Virginia, 1987.
- Isabel bishop: Exhibition. National Museum of Women in the Arts. (2024, February 14).
- Todd, Ellen Wiley. The "New Woman" Revised: Painting and Gender Politics on Fourteenth Street. Berkley: University of California Press, 1993.
- Todd, Ellen Wiley. "Isabel Bishop-Our Modern Master?" Woman's Art Journal 13 (Spring/Summer 1992): 45-47.
- Yglesias, Helen. Isabel Bishop. New York: Rizzoli, 1989.
