= Claudia (American literary character) =

American literary character created by Rose Franken

Claudia is an American literary character created by author Rose Franken. An article in Life magazine's March 31, 1941, issue said, "One of the oddest phenomena in the entertainment world is how a little idea like Claudia can grow into big business."

The Claudia stories originated as serialized narratives in Redbook and Good Housekeeping magazines. The stories focused on the Naughton family: Claudia, David (her husband), Bobby and Matthew (their sons) and relatives of the family. A 1949 article in Radio Album magazine pointed out the similarity between author and character: "Knowing Rose Franken is having special insight into how Claudia got the way she is. ... People who should know claim that Miss Franken is Claudia."

Franken's obituary in The New York Times described the Claudia works as follows:

Miss Franken's works displayed a steadfast conviction that marriage was a compound of gaiety and disaster, in which the partners matured as the result of shared experience. A woman, moreover, through fortitude understanding and perspective, could make marriage a happy estate.

That initial series of stories eventually grew into eight novels, two films, a play, a radio series, and a television series.

== Books ==
Books in the Claudia series are as follows: Claudia, Claudia and David, Another Claudia, Young Claudia, The Marriage of Claudia, From Claudia to David, Those Fragile Years, The Antic Years, The Book of Claudia, Return of Claudia, and Complete Book Of Claudia. The first eight books in the series were bestsellers, with the rest involving revisions and compilations of those.

== Play ==
Claudia ran 722 times on Broadway from 1941 to 1943, with Dorothy McGuire in the title role. Franken wrote and directed the play, which producer John Golden said was his favorite of his more than 100 Broadway productions.

== Films ==
Adapting the play to film, 20th Century Fox produced Claudia in 1943, with McGuire again portraying Claudia and with Robert Young as David. The two reprised their roles in the sequel, Claudia and David (1946).

== Television ==
The series Claudia (also known as Claudia, the Story of a Marriage), was broadcast in 1952, first on NBC and then on CBS. In 1956, Franken tried to launch a new version of the program. Several entities showed interest in the project, and two pilot episodes were made, but to no avail.

== Radio ==
Two series featuring Claudia were heard on American radio. The first, titled Claudia and David, was on CBS in 1941, and the second was syndicated in 1947.
