= The Life of Vergie Winters =

1934 film by Alfred Santell

- Directed by: Alfred Santell
- Starring: Ann Harding; John Boles; Ben Alexander
- Distributed by: RKO Radio Pictures
- Release date: June 22, 1934
- Country: United States
- Language: English
- Budget: $331,000
- Box office: $654,000

The Life of Vergie Winters is a 1934 American Pre-Code drama film, starring Ann Harding and John Boles.

== Plot ==
From her Parkville jail cell, Vergie Winters watches the funeral procession of Senator John Shadwell and remembers her twenty-year past with him: The moment young lawyer John returns to Parkville from an extended honeymoon with his social climbing wife Laura, he visits Vergie, his former lover. After a passionate embrace, John explains to the youthful milliner that he had abandoned their romance because Vergie's father had told him that she was pregnant by laborer Hugo McQueen and would be forced to marry. Vergie then tells John that, to keep her from marrying John, Laura's father had paid her father $10,000 to tell him that devastating lie.

Still deeply in love, John and Vergie continue to see each other, but when John starts to campaign for Congress, Preston, a political boss, informs Vergie that, if John is to receive his vital support, she must forego their affair. Although Vergie agrees to Preston's terms, John refuses to end the relationship and spends a long evening with her before the election.

After a victorious win, John moves to Washington, D.C., with Laura, Vergie bears his child under an assumed name. John then adopts the baby, named Joan, whom he claims is the child of a destitute family friend.

At the start of World War I, John returns to Parkville and once again resumes his affair with Vergie. When one of John's late night rendezvous is witnessed by a town gossip and reported to Mike Davey, John's only political enemy, Vergie's successful millinery shop is boycotted, and she is shunned by all but the local prostitutes. In addition, Davey hires Preston's son Barry to steal from Preston's home safe a page from a hotel register on which Vergie had written her assumed name. As Barry is breaking into his father's safe, however, Preston mistakes him for a burglar and kills him, but tells his butler that a burglar shot his son.

Many years later, after John has started a prosperous airline company and has been elected senator, Vergie spends her mornings watching a now grown Joan horseback riding with her fiancé, Ranny Truesdale. Unknown to Vergie, Laura has hired a private detective to spy on her in order to prove that Joan is actually her rival's daughter. Unable to secure her proof, Laura forces John to tell Joan that she is adopted. To John's relief, Joan and Ranny accept the news calmly and proceed with their marriage plans.

After the wedding, John informs Laura that he wants a divorce so that he can marry Vergie. Laura, desperate to hang on to her social standing, follows John to Vergie's house and, in a rage, shoots and kills him. Because Vergie is unwilling to name Laura as the murderer, she is convicted of the crime and sent to prison. One year later, Joan and Ranny, having heard Laura's dying confession about the killing, secure a pardon for Vergie and offer her a permanent place in their home.

== Cast ==
- Ann Harding as Vergie Winters
- John Boles as John Shadwell
- Helen Vinson as Laura Shadwell
- Betty Furness as Joan Shadwell
- Frank Albertson as Ranny Truesdale
- Lon Chaney Jr. as Hugo McQueen
- Sara Haden as Winnie Belle
- Molly O'Day as Sadie
- Ben Alexander as Barry Preston
- Donald Crisp as Mike Davey
- Maidel Turner as Ella Heenan
- Cecil Cunningham as Pearl Turner

== Reception ==
It made a profit of $87,000. The film was a box office disappointment for RKO.

Upon release, the film was condemned by the Roman Catholic Archdiocese of Chicago as "immoral and indecent".
