= Topo Swope =

American actress

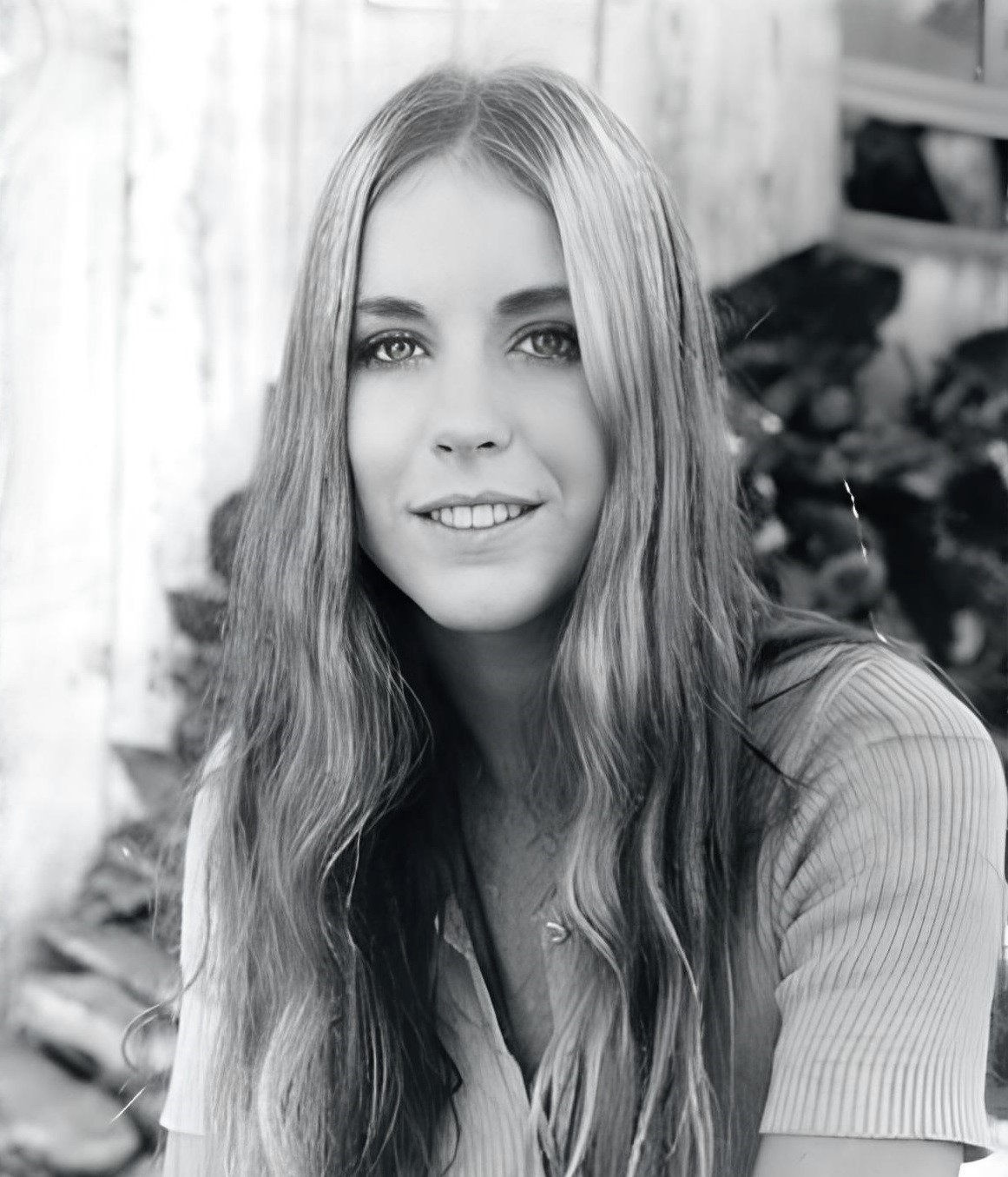
- Swope in My Old Man's Place (1971)
- Born: Mary Hackett Swope; February 14, 1949 (age 77); New York City, U.S.
- Years active: 1971-1979
- Parent(s): John Swope; Dorothy McGuire
- Website: http://www.toposwopetalent.com

Mary Hackett "Topo" Swope (born February 14, 1949) is an American actress and talent agent. She is the daughter of actress Dorothy McGuire and still photographer John Swope.

== Early life and family ==
Mary Hackett Swope was born on February 14, 1949, in New York City to photographer John Swope and film actress Dorothy McGuire.

== Film career ==
Swope acted in several films in the 1970s. She had a supporting role in the Peter Yates film The Hot Rock (1972) in which she appeared with Robert Redford and George Segal.

== Topo Swope Gallery ==
Following her film career, Swope opened an art gallery in Los Angeles. In September 1981 she mounted the first-ever exhibition of paintings by Henry Fonda, an old family friend. While the original paintings were not for sale, 200 signed lithographs were available for $500 apiece.

== Talent agent ==
In 1994 she founded Topo Swope Talent.

== Filmography ==
- My Old Man's Place (1971)
- Pretty Maids All in a Row (1971)
- The Hot Rock (1972)
- Tracks (1977)
- Hot Rod
- Starsky & Hutch (1 episode, 1979)
- The Little Dragons (1980)
