= Robert Simpson (film editor) =

American film editor (1910–1977)

Robert Laughlin Simpson
- Born: July 31, 1910; Missouri
- Died: June 26, 1977 (aged 66)
- Occupation: Film editor

Robert Laughlin Simpson, A.C.E. (July 31, 1910 – June 26, 1977), was an American film editor with more than 100 feature film credits.

== Biography ==
Born in St. Louis, Missouri, Simpson began his career at Paramount Pictures in 1935. By the end of the decade, he had joined 20th Century Fox, where he remained for more than 35 years.

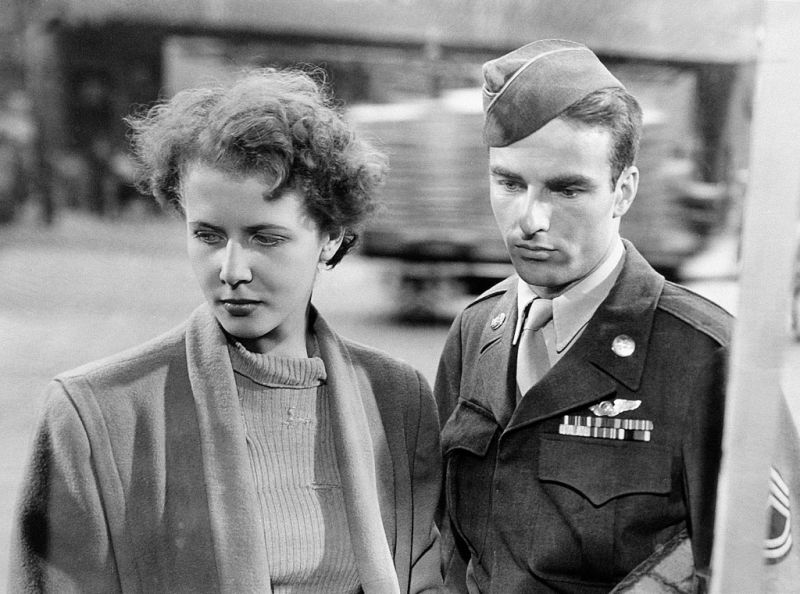
Cornell Borchers and Montgomery Clift in The Big Lift (1950)

During a 55-year career, Simpson edited one hundred films, including Drums Along the Mohawk (1939), The Grapes of Wrath (1940), The Pride of St. Louis (1952), Call Me Madam (1953), The King and I (1956), South Pacific (1958), Fate is the Hunter (1964), and Tony Rome (1967). He collaborated with director George Seaton on several projects, including Miracle on 34th Street, The Shocking Miss Pilgrim, Apartment for Peggy, and Chicken Every Sunday. He also worked with John Ford, Sidney Lanfield, and Walter Lang.

Simpson was nominated for the Academy Award for Best Film Editing for The Grapes of Wrath.

== Partial filmography ==
Based on Simpson's filmography at the Internet Database.

Editor
Year	Film	Director	Notes	Other notes
1935	The Gay Deception	William Wyler		
1936	Her Master's Voice	Joseph Santley		
1936	Big Brown Eyes	Raoul Walsh	First collaboration with Raoul Walsh	
1936	Palm Springs	Aubrey Scotto	First collaboration with Aubrey Scotto	
1936	Spendthrift	Raoul Walsh	Second collaboration with Raoul Walsh	
1936	Follow Your Heart	Aubrey Scotto	Second collaboration with Aubrey Scotto	
1936	The President's Mystery	Phil Rosen		
1936	One in a Million	Sidney Lanfield	First collaboration with Sidney Lanfield	
1937	Wake Up and Live	Sidney Lanfield	Second collaboration with Sidney Lanfield	
1937	Thin Ice	Sidney Lanfield	Third collaboration with Sidney Lanfield	
1937	Love and Hisses	Sidney Lanfield	Fourth collaboration with Sidney Lanfield	
1938	Josette	Allan Dwan		
1938	Always Goodbye	Sidney Lanfield	Fifth collaboration with Sidney Lanfield	
1938	Submarine Patrol	John Ford	First collaboration with John Ford	
1938	Thanks for Everything	William A. Seiter		
1939	The Hound of the Baskervilles	Sidney Lanfield	Sixth collaboration with Sidney Lanfield	
1939	Second Fiddle	Sidney Lanfield	Seventh collaboration with Sidney Lanfield	
1939	Drums Along the Mohawk	John Ford	Second collaboration with John Ford	
1940	The Grapes of Wrath	John Ford	Third collaboration with John Ford	
1940	Star Dust	Walter Lang	First collaboration with Walter Lang	
1940	The Man I Married	Irving Pichel	First collaboration with Irving Pichel	
1940	Public Deb No. 1	Gregory Ratoff	First collaboration with Gregory Ratoff	
1940	Hudson's Bay	Irving Pichel	Second collaboration with Irving Pichel	
1941	The Great American Broadcast	Archie Mayo		
1941	Belle Starr	Irving Cummings	First collaboration with Irving Cummings	
1941	I Wake Up Screaming	H. Bruce Humberstone	First collaboration with H. Bruce Humberstone	
1942	Song of the Islands	Walter Lang	Second collaboration with Walter Lang	
1942	My Gal Sal	Irving Cummings	Second collaboration with Irving Cummings	
1942	Footlight Serenade	Gregory Ratoff	Second collaboration with Gregory Ratoff	
1942	Springtime in the Rockies	Irving Cummings	Third collaboration with Irving Cummings	
1943	Coney Island	Walter Lang	Third collaboration with Walter Lang	
1943	Sweet Rosie O'Grady	Irving Cummings	Fourth collaboration with Irving Cummings	
1943	Claudia	Edmund Goulding	First collaboration with Edmund Goulding	
1944	Pin Up Girl	H. Bruce Humberstone	Second collaboration with H. Bruce Humberstone	
1944	Greenwich Village	Walter Lang	Fourth collaboration with Walter Lang	
1944	Something for the Boys	Lewis Seiler		
1945	Diamond Horseshoe	George Seaton	First collaboration with George Seaton	
1945	Junior Miss	George Seaton	Second collaboration with George Seaton	
1946	Claudia and David	Walter Lang	Fifth collaboration with Walter Lang	
1946	Do You Love Me	Gregory Ratoff	Third collaboration with Gregory Ratoff	
1947	The Shocking Miss Pilgrim	George Seaton	Third collaboration with George Seaton	
1947	The Homestretch	H. Bruce Humberstone	Third collaboration with H. Bruce Humberstone	
1947	Miracle on 34th Street	George Seaton	Fourth collaboration with George Seaton	
1948	Fury at Furnace Creek	H. Bruce Humberstone	Fourth collaboration with H. Bruce Humberstone	
1948	Apartment for Peggy	George Seaton	Fifth collaboration with George Seaton	
1949	Chicken Every Sunday	George Seaton	Sixth collaboration with George Seaton	
1949	The Forbidden Street	Jean Negulesco	First collaboration with Jean Negulesco	Uncredited
1949	Slattery's Hurricane	Andre de Toth		
1950	Wabash Avenue	Henry Koster	First collaboration with Henry Koster	
1950	The Big Lift	George Seaton	Seventh collaboration with George Seaton	
1950	American Guerrilla in the Philippines	Fritz Lang		
1950	For Heaven's Sake	George Seaton	Eighth collaboration with George Seaton	
1951	Rawhide	Henry Hathaway	First collaboration with Henry Hathaway	
1951	I Can Get It for You Wholesale	Michael Gordon	First collaboration with Michael Gordon	
1951	As Young as You Feel	Harmon Jones	First collaboration with Harmon Jones	
1951	The Model and the Marriage Broker	George Cukor	First collaboration with George Cukor	
1952	The Pride of St. Louis	Harmon Jones	Second collaboration with Harmon Jones	
1952	My Wife's Best Friend	Richard Sale	First collaboration with Richard Sale	
1953	Treasure of the Golden Condor	Delmer Daves		
1953	Call Me Madam	Walter Lang	Sixth collaboration with Walter Lang	
1953	The Girl Next Door	Richard Sale	Second collaboration with Richard Sale	
1953	Inferno	Roy Ward Baker		
1954	Prince Valiant	Henry Hathaway	Second collaboration with Henry Hathaway	
1954	There's No Business Like Show Business	Walter Lang	Seventh collaboration with Walter Lang	
1955	A Man Called Peter	Henry Koster	Second collaboration with Henry Koster	
1955	The Virgin Queen	Henry Koster	Third collaboration with Henry Koster	
1955	The View from Pompey's Head	Philip Dunne		
1956	The King and I	Walter Lang	Eighth collaboration with Walter Lang	
1957	The True Story of Jesse James	Nicholas Ray		
1957	Desk Set	Walter Lang	Ninth collaboration with Walter Lang	
1957	Kiss Them for Me	Stanley Donen		
1958	South Pacific	Joshua Logan		
1958	Mardi Gras	Edmund Goulding	Second collaboration with Edmund Goulding	
1959	Woman Obsessed	Henry Hathaway	Third collaboration with Henry Hathaway	
1959	The Best of Everything	Jean Negulesco	Second collaboration with Jean Negulesco	
1960	Can-Can	Walter Lang	Tenth collaboration with Walter Lang	
1960	High Time	Blake Edwards		
1961	Sanctuary	Tony Richardson		
1961	Marines, Let's Go	Raoul Walsh	Third collaboration with Raoul Walsh	
1962	The Chapman Report	George Cukor	Second collaboration with George Cukor	
1963	The Stripper	Franklin J. Schaffner		
1963	Move Over, Darling	Michael Gordon	Second collaboration with Michael Gordon	
1964	Fate Is the Hunter	Ralph Nelson		
1965	The Reward	Serge Bourguignon		
1965	Do Not Disturb	Ralph Levy		
1966	Daniel Boone: Frontier Trail Rider	George Sherman		
1967	Caprice	Frank Tashlin		
1967	Tony Rome	Gordon Douglas	First collaboration with Gordon Douglas	
1968	The Detective	Gordon Douglas	Second collaboration with Gordon Douglas	
1968	Lady in Cement	Gordon Douglas	Third collaboration with Gordon Douglas	
1969	100 Rifles	Tom Gries		
1969	The Undefeated	Andrew V. McLaglen	First collaboration with Andrew V. McLaglen	
1970	Chisum	Andrew V. McLaglen	Second collaboration with Andrew V. McLaglen	
1971	One More Train to Rob	Andrew V. McLaglen	Third collaboration with Andrew V. McLaglen	
1971	Fools' Parade	Andrew V. McLaglen	Fourth collaboration with Andrew V. McLaglen	
1971	Something Big	Andrew V. McLaglen	Fifth collaboration with Andrew V. McLaglen	
1973	Cahill U.S. Marshal	Andrew V. McLaglen	Sixth collaboration with Andrew V. McLaglen	

Editorial department
Year	Film	Director	Role	Notes
1933	It's Great to Be Alive	Alfred L. Werker	Editorial assistant	Uncredited

Actor
Year	Film	Director	Role	Notes
1936	Lloyd's of London	Henry King	Captain	Uncredited

TV series

Editor
Year	Title	Notes
1955	The 20th Century Fox Hour	1 episode
1960	Hong Kong	2 episodes
1963−65	Vacation Playhouse	3 episodes
1966	Daniel Boone	3 episodes

== See also ==
- List of film director and editor collaborations. From 1940 to 1960, Simpson edited ten films directed by Walter Lang; The King and I (1956) was nominated for both the Academy Award for Best Picture and the Academy Award for Best Director.
