= I Want You (1951 film) =

1951 film by Mark Robson

- Directed by: Mark Robson
- Screenplay by: Irwin Shaw
- Based on: The Wacky Afternoon; 1947 story in The New Yorker by Edward Newhouse
- Produced by: Samuel Goldwyn
- Starring: Dana Andrews; Dorothy McGuire
- Cinematography: Harry Stradling
- Edited by: Daniel Mandell
- Music by: Leigh Harline
- Production company: Samuel Goldwyn Productions
- Distributed by: RKO Radio Pictures
- Release date: December 22, 1951
- Running time: 102 minutes
- Country: United States
- Language: English
- Box office: $1.5 million (US rentals)

I Want You is a 1951 American drama film directed by Mark Robson that is set in America during the Korean War. Gordon E. Sawyer was nominated for the Academy Award for Best Sound.

== Plot ==
In the "early summer of 1950", Martin Greer is the engineer for a small construction company, Greer and Sons, working with his father. An Army combat engineer for four years during World War II, he and wife Nancy have two young children. Employee George Kress asks Martin to write a letter to the Selective Service System stating that his son, George Jr., is "indispensable" for their company and thus exempt from the draft. Martin reluctantly refuses, and George Jr. joins the Army at the beginning of the Korean War.

Martin's younger brother Jack is in love with college student Carrie Turner, daughter of a judge who is on the local draft board. Despite a trick knee that got him deferred once before, he is drafted. Jack suspects that her father, who feels his daughter can do better, is the reason. Jack and Martin's mother, who lost a son during the last war, asks Martin to write an "indispensable" letter for his brother; he seriously considers it, but does not do so, and Nancy criticizes Jack for his reluctance to serve. Jack joins the Army, where he briefly sees George Jr. before the latter goes to Korea.

George Jr. is listed as missing in action, although his fate isn't revealed, and his father drunkenly blames Martin. Harvey Landrum, Martin's commander in World War II, reenlists and asks Martin to join him, as engineers who know how to build airstrips are scarce. Eligible for exemptions, he initially declines, then agrees, over his wife's objections. Jack and Carrie marry during a furlough before he also goes overseas.

== Cast ==
- Dana Andrews as Martin Greer
- Dorothy McGuire as Nancy Greer
- Farley Granger as Jack Greer
- Peggy Dow as Carrie Turner
- Robert Keith as Thomas Greer (Martin and Jack's father, a World War I veteran)
- Mildred Dunnock as Sarah Greer (Martin and Jack's mother)
- Martin Milner as George Kress Jr.
- Jim Backus as Harvey Landrum
- Ray Collins as Judge Turner
- Marjorie Crossland as Mrs. Turner
- Walter Baldwin as George Kress Sr.
- Walter Sande as Ned Iversen
- Peggy Maley as Gladys (a woman George Jr. picks up while on leave)
- Jerrilyn Flannery as Anne Greer (Martin's 4-year-old daughter)
- Erik Nielsen as Tony Greer (Martin's son)

== Reception ==
Leonard Maltin gives the film three out of four stars, describing it as "Dated yet still touching Americana detailing effects of the Korean War on a small-town family. An artifact of its era, with fine performances all around."

At the time of its release, Bosley Crowther of The New York Times wrote: "All in all the running crisis of the 'cold war' has been absorbed in the cotton padding of sentiment. A straight recruiting poster would be more convincing and pack more dramatic appeal."
