= The Hot Rock (film) =

1972 film by Peter Yates

- Directed by: Peter Yates
- Screenplay by: William Goldman
- Based on: The Hot Rock; 1970 novel by Donald E. Westlake
- Produced by: Hal Landers; Bobby Roberts
- Starring: Robert Redford; George Segal; Ron Leibman; Paul Sand; Moses Gunn; William Redfield; Topo Swope; Zero Mostel
- Cinematography: Edward R. Brown
- Edited by: Frank P. Keller; Fred W. Berger
- Music by: Quincy Jones
- Production company: Landers-Roberts Inc.
- Distributed by: 20th Century Fox
- Release date: January 26, 1972
- Running time: 105 minutes
- Country: United States
- Language: English
- Budget: $4,895,000
- Box office: $3.5 million (rentals)

The Hot Rock is a 1972 American crime comedy-drama film directed by Peter Yates and written by William Goldman, based on Donald E. Westlake's 1970 novel of the same name, which introduced his long-running John Dortmunder character. The film stars Robert Redford, George Segal, Ron Leibman, Paul Sand, Moses Gunn and Zero Mostel. It was released in the UK with the alternative title How to Steal a Diamond in Four Uneasy Lessons.

== Plot ==
In 1971, after John Dortmunder is released from his latest stint in prison, he is approached by his brother-in-law Andy Kelp about another job. Dr. Amusa seeks a valuable gem in the Brooklyn Museum that is of great significance to his people in his country in Africa, stolen during colonial times and then re-stolen by various African nations.

Dortmunder and Kelp are joined by driver Stan Murch and explosives expert Allan Greenberg, concocting an elaborate plan to steal the gem. Although the scheme (and each subsequent one) is carefully planned—and keeps increasing in cost—something always goes awry, and the quartet has to steal the diamond again and again.

First off, the diamond is swallowed by Greenberg when he alone gets caught by the museum guards during the initial heist. Dortmunder, Kelp, and Murch, at the urging of Greenberg's rotund father Abe, a lawyer, help Greenberg escape from state prison, but they then find he does not have the diamond. After Greenberg tells his partners he hid the rock in the police station (after bodily evacuating it), the quartet break into the precinct jail by helicopter, but the rock is not where Greenberg hid it. Greenberg discloses that his father was the only other person who knew where it was.

It isn't until Murch, disguised as the grunting muscle man Chicken, threatens Greenberg with being thrown down an elevator shaft, that Abe gives up the location of the diamond—his safe deposit box, and he also gives up the key to it. However, Dortmunder cannot access the box because of bank vault security, and the gang leaves Abe in Dr. Amusa's office while they come up with a plan.

With the help of a hypnotist by the name of Miasmo, Dortmunder sets up his own safe deposit box to get access to the vault and then plans to invoke the predetermined hypnotic trigger phrase "Afghanistan banana stand" (Note: The original book is "banana stand" but some sources report it as "Afghanistan bananastan". However, the actor Lynne Gordon clearly enunciates a "d" on the end of the phrase.) to the vault guard. He then would be able to gain access to Abe's safe deposit box and retrieve the gem just after the bank opens in the morning.

While Dortmunder is waiting for the bank to open, the rest of the group meets with Dr. Amusa at his request. Dr. Amusa fires them for incompetence, and reveals that Abe Greenberg has made his own deal to sell him the gem, which will leave Dortmunder's gang with nothing.

Dortmunder finally retrieves the gem while Dr. Amusa and Abe are driving to the bank by limousine. He exits the bank and walks away just before they arrive. Dortmunder climbs into Kelp's car where the others are waiting, and a rousing cheer erupts as they drive off.

== Cast ==
- Robert Redford as John Dortmunder
- George Segal as Andy Kelp
- Ron Leibman as Stan Murch
- Paul Sand as Allan Greenberg
- Moses Gunn as Dr. Amusa
- Zero Mostel as Abe Greenberg
- William Redfield as Lt. Hoover
- Topo Swope as Carey "Sis" Dortmunder Kelp
- Christopher Guest as Policeman
- Graham Jarvis as Warden
- Lynne Gordon as Miasmo
- Charlotte Rae as Ma Murch
- Harry Bellaver as Rollo the Bartender

== Production ==
=== Development ===
The screenplay was by William Goldman, who called Westlake's book "wonderful, very funny ... I was a Westlake fan."

Peter Yates agreed to make the film "because all around me I was finding that people were making nothing but films about violence, sex and drugs ... Everything was a downer. I wanted to do an upper ... The point of this film is not that the characters are criminals, but that they are likable, and that they, like many people, plan things all their lives and never have it work out."

Yates called the film better than Bullitt "because the characters are better delineated ... and because it's a comedy mixed with suspense which is tenuous to pull off."

=== Shooting ===
As Dortmunder's gang flies through Manhattan to break into the police station, their helicopter flies by the World Trade Center. The south tower is clearly seen as still being under construction in several shots. All of the prison scenes at the beginning of the film were photographed at the Nassau County Jail Carman Avenue (today the Nassau County Correctional Center) in East Meadow, Long Island. The scenes of "the practice run" in which Ron Leibman drives his car into the back of a waiting tractor trailer was also filmed in East Meadow on Hempstead Turnpike.

== Reception ==
=== Box office ===
"I thought I had a hit with The Hot Rock," Yates said. "It was an interesting story, and we had Robert Redford and George Segal for the leads. Nobody went to see it."

=== Critical ===
Roger Ebert of the Chicago Sun-Times gave the film two-and-a-half stars out of four and wrote that it "is a long way from being the perfect caper movie but, bless it, has two or three scenes good enough for any caper movie ever made. If you're a pushover for caper movies, like I am, that will be enough." Roger Greenspun of The New York Times stated that "if The Hot Rock is never quite good enough, it is always pretty good—and inventive, and attentive to reasonable detail." Charles Champlin of the Los Angeles Times called it "a lightly amusing caper film. It is dominated by its splendid gallery of performances rather than by its style, ingenuity or suspense, all of which are unexceptional." Variety described it as a "good caper film" that "emerges as an offbeat crime feature with broad audience potential." Gary Arnold of The Washington Post thought that Redford gave what "seems more like a frozen, impassive performance than the ironically funny and affecting one it's supposed to be." Arnold also found the script "dangerously underwritten. Once again Goldman has his tongue in his cheek, as he did in Butch Cassidy, but he isn't moving it around with equal zest and confidence." Nigel Andrews of The Monthly Film Bulletin stated "Within the limits of an increasingly familiar genre, How to Steal a Diamond springs a number of enjoyable surprises. Although the early scenes threaten another conveyor-belt variation on the 'perfect robbery' film, How to Steal a Diamond has the entertaining difference that the criminals' plans go wrong on three occasions before they finally make off with the loot."

As of November 2025, the film holds a rating of 83% on Rotten Tomatoes, based on 23 reviews with the consensus: "Smart direction and an outstanding ensemble cast help enliven The Hot Rock's relatively standard plot, making this heist caper worthy of stealing your time."

=== Awards ===
Frank P. Keller and Fred W. Berger were nominated for the Academy Award for Best Film Editing. Goldman was nominated for the Edgar Allan Poe Award for Best Motion Picture Screenplay.

=== Legacy ===
Punk rock band Sleater-Kinney's 1998 album The Hot Rock is named after the film. The cover of the album features the band imitating the film's poster in downtown Portland, Oregon.

== Musical score and soundtrack ==
The Hot Rock

Soundtrack album by Quincy Jones
- Released: 1972
- Recorded: December 1971
- Studio: Record Plant, Los Angeles, CA
- Genre: Film score
- Length: 34:10
- Label: Prophesy; SD 6055
- Producer: Quincy Jones

Quincy Jones chronology
Smackwater Jack (1971)	The Hot Rock (1972)	You've Got It Bad Girl (1973)

The film score was composed, arranged and conducted by Quincy Jones and the soundtrack album originally was released on the Prophesy label in 1972. The Vinyl Factory stated "Quincy concocts some snazzy caper music for this peak-period Redford caper flick, which features primo instrumentation from Grady Tate, Clark Terry and Gerry Mulligan, as well as members of L.A.'s famed Wrecking Crew. They lay down some great beats and breaks throughout – no wonder it’s been sampled by the likes of Eminem".

=== Track listing ===
All compositions by Quincy Jones except where noted

1. "Listen to the Melody" (Quincy Jones, Bill Rinehart, Tay Uhler) − 3:44
2. "Main Title" − 3:14
3. "Talking Drums" − 2:08
4. "Seldom Seen Sam" − 2:30
5. "Parole Party" − 1:59
6. "When You Believe" (Rinehart) − 2:53
7. "Hot Rock Theme" − 2:45
8. "Miasmo" − 2:13
9. "Sahara Stone" − 3:00
10. "Slam City" − 1:56
11. "Listen to the Melody/Dixie Tag" − 4:38
12. "End Title" − 3:10

=== Personnel ===
- Orchestra arranged and conducted by Quincy Jones including:
- Tata (tracks 1 & 6), The Ian Smith Singers (track 1), The Don Elliot Voices (track 7) − vocals
- Clark Terry − trumpet
- Frank Rosolino − trombone
- Jerome Richardson − clarinet, soprano saxophone, tenor saxophone
- Gerry Mulligan − baritone saxophone
- Mike Melvoin − synthesizer
- Clare Fischer − piano (track 7)
- Victor Feldman − vibraphone
- Emil Richards − vibraphone, percussion
- Ray Brown − bass
- Carol Kaye, Chuck Rainey − electric bass
- Grady Tate − drums, percussion
- Bobbye Hall − percussion
- Bill Rinehart, Don Altfeld − arranger (track 6)

== See also ==
- List of American films of 1972
- Heist film

== Sources ==
- Egan, Sean, William Goldman: The Reluctant Storyteller, Bear Manor Media 2014
