= Screen Directors Playhouse (radio series) =

American radio dramatic anthology series (1949–1951)

Screen Directors Playhouse is an American radio dramatic anthology program that was broadcast on NBC from January 9, 1949, through September 28, 1951. Initially it was called NBC Theater.

Episodes of Screen Directors Playhouse were adaptations of films. Each episode began with an introduction by the director of the film being featured, and it concluded with a conversation between that director and the stars of the episode. Margaret Truman appeared in a dramatic role for the first time on the program.

== NBC Theater ==
NBC Theater debuted on January 9, 1949, which was a replacement for Fred Allen's program at 8:30 p.m. Eastern Time on Sundays. Broadcasts were done in cooperation with the Screen Directors Guild. The premiere episode was "Stagecoach", with John Wayne re-creating his role in the film of the same name.

== Schedule and name change ==
On March 13, 1949, the show was moved to 9 p.m. E. T. on Sundays. It was moved to Fridays, 8:30 to 9 p.m. E. T. beginning July 1, 1949, as a summer replacement for Eddie Cantor's program, with Pabst Brewing Company as sponsor. The Pabst sponsorship was accompanied by a change in name as the program became Screen Directors Playhouse. The trade publication Billboard reported that NBC discounted the show's price for the summer, saying that the network wanted "to snare a bankroller during summer months even at a loss, thus cutting its overhead on the show and getting sponsorship prestige." After the summer run, the show was heard on Mondays at 10 p.m. E. T. Beginning on November 18, 1949, it was moved to Fridays at 10 p.m. E. T. It was sustaining until RCA became its sponsor on January 6, 1950.

=== Episodes ===
Partial List of Episodes of NBC Theater/Screen Directors Playhouse
Date	Episode	Actor(s)	Director
January 9, 1949	"Stagecoach"	John Wayne	John Ford
February 6, 1949	"Hired Wife"	Rosalind Russell	
March 6, 1949	"Manhattan Merry-Go-Round"	Rosalind Russell, Marlene Dietrich, John Lund	Billy Wilder
March 13, 1949	"You Were Meant for Me"	Dan Dailey	Lloyd Bacon
April 2, 1949	"The Ghost Breakers"	Bob Hope	
August 5, 1949	"Fort Apache"	John Wayne, Ward Bond	
November 25, 1949	"The Spiral Staircase"	Dorothy McGuire	
December 2, 1949	"All My Sons"	Edward G. Robinson	
December 9, 1949	"Call Northside 777"	James Stewart	Henry Hathaway
January 13, 1950	"Tomorrow Is Forever"	Claudette Colbert	
March 17, 1950	"Champion"		
March 24, 1950	"Chicago Deadline"	Alan Ladd	
March 31, 1950	"The Dark Mirror"	Olivia de Havilland	
May 26, 1950	"Flamingo Road"	Joan Crawford	
November 23, 1950	"Mrs. Mike"	Dick Powell, June Allyson	
December 7, 1950	"My Favorite Wife"	Cary Grant, Irene Dunne	
February 15, 1951	"Dark Victory"	Tallulah Bankhead	
February 22, 1951	"No Minor Vices"	Dana Andrews, Louis Jourdan	
April 26, 1951	"Jackpot"	Margaret Truman, James Stewart	

== Production ==
Jimmy Wallington was the announcer, and Henry Russell led the orchestra. Howard Wiley was the producer. Milton Geiger and Richard Simmons were the writers.

Screen Directors Playhouse was one of several shows in 1949 that mixed recordings of dialog with live performances of musical components. When the show was broadcast, engineers synchronized playback of taped segments with the live musical bridges and themes. That technique reduced expenses because musicians' fees for live broadcasts were lower than those for transcribed productions. By November 1950, however, the show had become one of several network radio programs that used "canned bridges and cues".

== Recognition ==
In November 1949, the National Council of Teachers of English presented an award to NBC Theater as "the program which during 1948-49 school year has done most to promote greater understanding and appreciation of our literary heritage". In December 1949, was a second-place selection for "outstanding entertainment in drama" in the Peabody Awards.

== Critical response ==
Radio historian John Dunning wrote in his book On the Air: The Encyclopedia of Old-Time Radio, that Screen Directors Playhouse demonstrated the importance of writing for radio programs, saying that such importance "was seldom better demonstrated than here. Though the material had a familiar sound, it was made fresh."
