= Callaway Went Thataway =

1951 film by Norman Panama, Melvin Frank

- Theatrical release poster
- Directed by: Melvin Frank; Norman Panama
- Written by: Melvin Frank; Norman Panama
- Produced by: Melvin Frank; Norman Panama
- Starring: Fred MacMurray; Dorothy McGuire; Howard Keel
- Cinematography: Ray June
- Edited by: Cotton Warburton
- Music by: Marlin Skiles
- Color process: Black and white
- Production company: Metro-Goldwyn-Mayer
- Distributed by: Loew's, Inc.
- Release dates: November 14, 1951 (Houston); December 5, 1951 (New York)
- Running time: 82 minutes
- Country: United States
- Language: English
- Budget: $1,103,000
- Box office: $1,338,000

Callaway Went Thataway is a 1951 American comedy Western film starring Fred MacMurray, Dorothy McGuire and Howard Keel. It was written, directed and produced by Melvin Frank and Norman Panama. Also known as The Star Said No, it is a spoof of the craze generated by the television program Hopalong Cassidy.

== Plot ==
Mike Frye and Deborah Patterson, owners of an advertising firm, find success when they recycle some old Western films starring Smoky Callaway for a new television audience. Tom Lorrison, the show's sponsor, is eager to produce more films, but nobody has seen Smoky in ten years. Under intense pressure, Frye hires Smoky's agent Georgie Markham to find him.

A letter arrives from a cowboy named Stretch Barnes, who bears a strong resemblance to Smoky. After viewing Stretch's photograph, Frye and Patterson visit him. Although Stretch is reluctant, they persuade him to impersonate Smoky, telling him that Smoky is dead.

After a dinner with Lorrison and his wife Martha, Frye and Patterson are approved to launch a marketing campaign. Patterson embarks on a nationwide publicity tour with Stretch. As they spend time together, Stretch falls in love with her, and he presents her with an engagement ring. She is reluctant to accept it, but he tells her to keep it and wear it only if she loves him.

Markham finally finds Smoky, a selfish, womanizing drunk, in a Mexican bar. Smoky is uninterested in returning to work, but Markham kidnaps him and persuades him on the return boat trip. Frye is displeased when Smoky appears in his office, but he sees that he has no choice. He sends Smoky to a health farm to regain his shape. However, despite strict supervision, Smoky stashes bottles of liquor everywhere.

When a woman accosts Stretch on the street and accuses him of failing to help needy children, he is moved. After some thought, he secretly hires a lawyer to establish a children's foundation that will receive nearly all of his earnings.

When Smoky and Stretch meet by chance, Stretch discovers that he has been duped and wants to return home. The law firm's representative appears with the legal document establishing the charity foundation. Stretch devises a plan. With Smoky still in poor physical condition, Frye and Patterson had begged him to appear at the Los Angeles Coliseum. Stretch decides to accept, intending to sign the document in front of 90,000 fans and dignitaries. When Smoky learns of his scheme, he objects, and the men brawl, with Smoky knocked unconscious. Frye and Markham try to intervene and suffer the same fate. When Smoky awakens, he realizes that he cannot stop Stretch, so he returns to Mexico, as he would only be paid a modest salary for a great deal of hard work. At the coliseum, Stretch meets Patterson, who approves of his plan and wears his ring.

== Cast ==
- Fred MacMurray as Mike Frye
- Dorothy McGuire as Deborah Patterson
- Howard Keel as "Stretch" Barnes / "Smoky" Callaway
- Jesse White as Georgie Markham
- Fay Roope as Tom Lorrison
- Natalie Schafer as Martha Lorrison
- Douglas Kennedy as Drunk
- Elisabeth Fraser as Marie
- John Indrisano as Johnny Terrento
- Stan Freberg as Marvin
- Don Haggerty as Director Don

Clark Gable, Elizabeth Taylor, and Esther Williams make cameo appearances.

== Reception ==
In a contemporary review for The New York Times, critic Bosley Crowther wrote:

The efforts of the advertising duo—or should we say Panama and Frank?—to calf-rope and corral their hayseed and make him act like a genuine star, albeit in conventional Westerns, make for explosive guffaws, not to mention moderate temptations to more profound chuckles, now and then. ... With no disrespect to the picture, nor to its writer-director-producer team, it must be said that the momentum slackens off a bit when the real Callaway is siphoned out of a South American saloon and brought back to Hollywood to badger the hard-pressed perpetrators of the hoax. In this situation, sentiment solemnly intrudes and a quaint little imp of romance rears its familiar head.

According to MGM records, the film earned $1,071,000 in the U.S. and Canada and $267,000 elsewhere, resulting in a loss of $294,000.
