= Claudia and David (radio program) =

American old-time radio drama

- Other names: Claudia
- Genre: Drama
- Running time: 30/15 minutes
- Country of origin: United States
- Language: English
- Syndicates: CBS
- TV adaptations: Claudia
- Starring: Patricia Ryan; Richard Kollmar
- Announcer: Joe King
- Original release: July 4 – September 26, 1941
- Sponsored by: Grape-Nuts; Grape-Nuts Flakes

Claudia and David is an American old-time radio drama. One version was broadcast on CBS July 4, 1941 – September 26, 1941 and another was syndicated in 1947.

== Background ==
Claudia and David was first heard on radio in a segment on the June 6, 1941, episode of The Kate Smith Hour. At that time, Claudia had just fallen in love with David. When Smith's program went off for the summer, the 10-minute segments were expanded to fill her time slot. The couple's wedding occurred on the July 11, 1941, episode.

The characters first appeared in 10 short stories by Rose Franken that were published in Redbook magazine from October 1938 through August 1939. Claudia, the Story of a Marriage, a book that included those stories and additional material, was published in 1939. It was followed by other books about the couple.

== Premise ==
The program focused on the lives of David and Claudia Naughton, a young married couple. At 18, Claudia's close ties to her mother threatened the future of her marriage to David. The couple also had to deal with financial problems, getting used to each other, and other adjustments typical of a new marriage. In the first episode, David's life was threatened by a sudden illness, resulting in increased tension between David's mother and the rest of the family, while it strengthened the bonds among David, Claudia, and her mother.

General Foods was the sponsor, promoting Grape-Nuts and Grape-Nuts Flakes.

== Personnel ==
The program's actors and the characters that they portrayed are shown in the table below.

Actor	Character
Patricia Ryan	Claudia Brown Naughton
Richard Kollmar	David Naughton
Jane Seymour	Claudia's mother
Irene Hubbard	David's mother

Source: Radio Programs, 1924-1984: A Catalog of More Than 1800 Shows

Joe King was the announcer, and Peter van Steeden provided the music.

== Syndicated version ==
Claudia and David was brought back to radio in 1947 with a new cast, a new sponsor, and a new means of distribution. Katharine Bard and Paul Crabtree played Claudia and David, and Peggy Allenby played Mrs. Brown. The program was sponsored by Coca-Cola and distributed via Electrical transcription. It originated at WGN in Chicago.
