= Edward Newhouse =

American journalist (1911–2002)

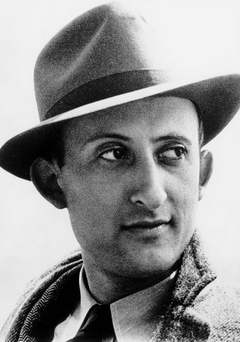
Newhouse c. 1941

Edward Newhouse (November 10, 1911 – November 11, 2002) was a short story author and staff writer for The New Yorker. He was born Ede Ujhazi in Hungary and was married to Dorothy DeLay. Edward wrote proletarian novels in the 1930s, and many short stories about life, and he worked for almost thirty years with the New Yorker. He was a friend of many of the literary giants of the 20th century. His writings from 1929 to 1965 were instructive for both an understanding of the radical mindset and as an example of the late manifestation of American literary realism. He retired from a literary career in the year 1965. He also helped story movies like I Want You and Shadow in the Sky.

During World War II, Newhouse served as a major in the U.S. Army. In 1945, he was one of 16 Army officers and enlisted men singled out as alleged Communists by the House Committee on Military Affairs. General "Wild Bill" Donovan came to their defense, citing their loyalty and effectiveness.

== Selected bibliography ==
=== Novels ===
- You Can't Sleep Here (1934)
- This Is Your Day (1937)
- The Hollow of the Wave (1950)
- The Temptation of Roger Heriott (1954)

=== Short story collections ===
- Anything Can Happen (1941)
- The Iron Chain (1946)
- Many Are Called (1951)

=== Short stories ===
All stories published in The New Yorker except as noted.

Title	Publication	Collected in
"The Girl Who Had to Get Married" (aka "13. Tom Martens")	January 21, 1939	Anything Can Happen
"The Mentocrats" (aka "1. Benny Frankel")	May 6, 1939	Anything Can Happen
"You Never Used to Be Like This" (aka "3. Walter Schlesinger")	June 3, 1939	Anything Can Happen
"Never Trust a Woman" (aka "14. Jake Shapiro")	July 8, 1939	Anything Can Happen
"Ever Been to Brooklyn?" (aka "22. Glenn Carson")	March 16, 1940	Anything Can Happen
"A Hot Time in the Old Town" (aka "5. Manny Hirsch")	May 25, 1940	Anything Can Happen
"Not Lonely But Alone" (aka "4. Roger Dunn")	June 1, 1940	Anything Can Happen
"All They Do Is Talk" (aka "26. Theodore Smith")	July 13, 1940	Anything Can Happen
"Everything Will Be All Right" (aka "26. Theodore Smith")	The New Republic (September 30, 1940)	Anything Can Happen
"Ten Years on a Desert Island" (aka "30. Jake Shapiro")	November 23, 1940	Anything Can Happen
"Billy the Bastard" (aka "Tough Kid" and "8. Tom Martens")	January 4, 1941	Anything Can Happen
"The Wolf" (aka "29. Dan Mulloy")	January 25, 1941	Anything Can Happen
"The Revolution" (aka "7. Manny Hirsch")	? (ca. April 1941)	Anything Can Happen
"Out Where the West Begins" (aka "10. Tom Martens")	April 19, 1941	Anything Can Happen
"With Men It's Different" (aka "28. Max Johannes")	October 4, 1941	Anything Can Happen
"2. Roger Dunn"	Anything Can Happen (November 1941)	Anything Can Happen
"6. Roger Dunn"	Anything Can Happen (November 1941)	Anything Can Happen
"9. Douglas Shane"	Anything Can Happen (November 1941)	Anything Can Happen
"12. Henry Boyce"	Anything Can Happen (November 1941)	Anything Can Happen
"15. Sam Baker"	Anything Can Happen (November 1941)	Anything Can Happen
"16. Barney Lindemuth"	Anything Can Happen (November 1941)	Anything Can Happen
"17. Howard Horn"	Anything Can Happen (November 1941)	Anything Can Happen
"18. Bill Bongiorno"	Anything Can Happen (November 1941)	Anything Can Happen
"19. Louis Wyman"	Anything Can Happen (November 1941)	Anything Can Happen
"20. Jake Shapiro"	Anything Can Happen (November 1941)	Anything Can Happen
"21. Joe Sylvester"	Anything Can Happen (November 1941)	Anything Can Happen
"23. Joe Sylvester"	Anything Can Happen (November 1941)	Anything Can Happen
"24. Robert Drucker"	Anything Can Happen (November 1941)	Anything Can Happen
"25. Sidney Rankin"	Anything Can Happen (November 1941)	Anything Can Happen
"27. Arthur Brunel"	Anything Can Happen (November 1941)	Anything Can Happen
"Dr. Frederick Curtis"	Anything Can Happen (November 1941)	Anything Can Happen
"The Eagle"	November 22, 1941	The Iron Chain
"Defense of the Islands"	December 20, 1941	-
"The Legs Go First"	February 28, 1942	The Iron Chain
"The Indecent Haste of Horace Gardner"	March 14, 1942	-
"The Magic Hour"	May 9, 1942	The Iron Chain
"Vacancy in Westchester"	August 8, 1942	The Iron Chain
"The Day Before"	September 5, 1942	The Iron Chain
"Mother's Day"	September 19, 1942	-
"A Gorgeous Number"	October 3, 1942	The Iron Chain
"Position of the Soldier"	July 10, 1943	The Iron Chain
"Close Your Eyes" aka "Close Your Eyes and Say This Is the Washington Yemonumet"	October 9, 1943	The Iron Chain
"In Time of Calamity"	January 29, 1944	The Iron Chain
"A Short Visit to Naples"	May 27, 1944	The Iron Chain
"I Hope You'll Understand"	January 20, 1945	The Iron Chain
"The Four Freedoms"	February 10, 1945	The Iron Chain
"Pro and Con"	September 1, 1945	The Iron Chain
"Time Out"	October 20, 1945	The Iron Chain
"Poker Game"	December 29, 1945	The Iron Chain
"The Impossible"	February 9, 1946	The Iron Chain
"What Do You Do?"	March 2, 1946	The Iron Chain
"Irving"	The Iron Chain (October 1946)	The Iron Chain
"Major and Mrs. Fletcher"	The Iron Chain (October 1946)	The Iron Chain
"The Swarm"	The Iron Chain (October 1946)	The Iron Chain
"Delay En Route"	The Iron Chain (October 1946)	The Iron Chain
"The Iron Chain"	The Iron Chain (October 1946)	The Iron Chain
"Put Yourself in My Place"	February 15, 1947	Many Are Called
"The Light Across the Hill"	April 5, 1947	Many Are Called
"Choice of Weapons"	May 10, 1947	Many Are Called
"A Couple of Old-Timers"	May 31, 1947	Many Are Called
"The Wacky Afternoon"	September 20, 1947	Many Are Called
"The Volcano"	October 11, 1947	Many Are Called
"Seventy Thousand Dollars"	August 6, 1949	Many Are Called
"My Brother's Second Funeral"	October 8, 1949	Many Are Called
"The Bronze Thing"	November 19, 1949	Many Are Called
"New Year's Day"	December 31, 1949	Many Are Called
"Come Again Another Day"	April 15, 1950	Many Are Called
"The War for Tony"	September 2, 1950	Many Are Called
"The Ambassador"	April 20, 1957	-
"The Bromley Touch"	May 18, 1957	-
"Howard and Dinah"	November 23, 1957	-
"Lead, Damsel, and I Follow"	March 8, 1958	-
"Debut Recital"	April 26, 1958	-
"Hungarians"	November 27, 1965	-
