= Another Language =

1933 film

- Directed by: Edward H. Griffith
- Written by: Herman J. Mankiewicz; Donald Ogden Stewart
- Based on: Another Language; 1932 play by Rose Franken
- Produced by: Walter Wanger
- Starring: Robert Montgomery; Helen Hayes; Louise Closser Hale
- Cinematography: Ray June
- Edited by: Hugh Wynn
- Production company: Metro-Goldwyn-Mayer
- Release date: July 28, 1933
- Running time: 77 minutes
- Country: United States
- Language: English
- Budget: $269,600
- Box office: $467,193

Another Language is a 1933 American Pre-Code romantic drama film directed by Edward H. Griffith and starring Robert Montgomery and Helen Hayes.

== Plot ==
Stella and Victor (“Vicky”) meet in Europe, fall deeply in love, and marry soon thereafter. They sail back to the States to meet Victor's family, and the honeymoon is over: Victor's ill-mannered but hyper-critical family is dominated by his manipulative mother, who is “too run down” to meet the boat. They bring her a huge bouquet of chrysanthemums, too big for her vase. Stella suggests using the umbrella stand, and her mother-in-law's response sets the tone for the future. She allows them to use the stand (which is actually a china vase) but consigns it to a corner.

Three years later, Stella and Vicky have never taken a vacation because his mother always gets sick. Stella tries her best not to criticize Mother Hallam. She thinks that she and Vicky need some time alone together and proposes a short trip. She has been avoiding the family's set-in-stone Tuesday-night dinners by going to art school. Vicky kisses her on the forehead and leaves for work. Tonight, Stella stays late working on a bust of her husband, intended as a surprise. Vicky comes to pick her up.

Pop Hallam is enjoying the jigsaw puzzle Stella gave him. The rest of the family happily munches on cake and bonbons and tears Stella to pieces, revealing that when Stella wanted to get a job, Mother made Vicky forbid it. The criticism does not stop after they arrive, hours late. Stella asks them to leave them alone, with predictable results. Vicky's nephew Jerry arrives. In the kitchen, he tells Stella about how the family thwarted his dreams of being an architect. Stella invites the family for next Tuesday. As they leave, Walter pulls his trick of whistling and running a finger down Stella's back. Jerry is outraged, but they make him apologize.

In their apartment, the bust of Vicky is on their mantelpiece. He is oblivious to it. Jerry drops in and—unlike Vicky— is eager to join Stella on a walk in the rain.

Come Tuesday night, Vicky is concerned about having enough food. Jerry bristles at Vicky's treatment of Stella, who tells him he is not really in love with her. The family arrives in time to keep Jerry from telling Vicky that he is in love with Stella. Mother has an attack, blaming it on the stairs, although she runs up and down her own all day long. She lies down in the bedroom, but soon emerges. They prevail on Jerry to dance with Stella, and his feelings are clear when he kisses her tenderly on the forehead. . Wally offers him the bust as a prize and Jerry smashes it to the floor declaring “You blind vulgar fools!” Stella tells Mother Hallam and the rest that they must leave Jerry—and herself and her husband—alone. She appeals to Vicky, who tells her to make some excuse. Mother insists on leaving, and after further rowing with Stella, Vicky follows. Jerry returns and declares his love. They kiss.

At the folks, Vicky is not eating breakfast and is getting up looking tor Stella. He called her to tell her to come over and apologize. Stella comes to the door. She tells him Jerry stayed until three o'clock. Vicky does not understand what has happened. She doesn't care about what the family thinks—It's another language. He tries kissing her, but she is out of reach. Jerry's parents arrive; his mother is distraught. Jerry comes in and admits he's in love and she is married. Vicky realizes the woman is Stella. He says he is proud of loving her. Vicky says he knew and he and Stella took it as a joke, and Jerry flees. But Stella won't stand for the deception. Mother comes down just as Vicky is speaking seriously to Stella, who leaves, with Vicky behind her. Mother swoons into a chair, but Pop tells her not to bother—he can't see her. “Shut up!” she replies.

It's raining outside. “I thought you liked to walk in the rain. I do,” Vicky says. She takes his arm and they stroll through the downpour. He buys an umbrella from a sidewalk vendor and tucks it under his arm as they turn the corner.

== Cast ==
- Robert Montgomery as Victor Hallam
- Helen Hayes as Stella Hallam
- Louise Closser Hale as Mother Hallam
- John Beal as Jerry Hallam
- Henry Travers as Pop Hallam
- Margaret Hamilton as Helen Hallam
- Willard Robertson as Harry Hallam
- Minor Watson as Paul Hallam
- Hal K. Dawson as Walter Hallam
- Irene Cattell as Grace Hallam
- Maidel Turner as Etta Hallam
- William Farnum as C. Forrester
