= Anthony Sydes =

American actor (1941–2015)

- Publicity Photo of Anthony Sydes
- Born: Thomas Anthony Sydes; May 4, 1941; North Hollywood, California
- Died: June 20, 2015 (aged 74); Springfield, Virginia
- Occupations: Actor, auctioneer
- Spouse: Anne Driscoll Sydes
- Children: 3

Thomas Anthony Sydes (May 4, 1941 – June 20, 2015) was an American child actor on film and television.

== Biography ==
Sydes was born May 4, 1941, in North Hollywood, California. He was the son of Thomas and Ruth Sydes, and he had a brother, Jonathan, and two sisters, Debbie and Carol.

Sydes made his film debut in Claudia and David (1946). Sydes' last film appearance was in Gunsmoke in Tucson (1958).

After his retirement from acting, Sydes joined the United States Army in 1963, and was stationed in Vietnam, Germany, and Italy. He earned a National Defense Service Medal and a Purple Heart for his 20 years of service.

Sydes founded A&A Auction Gallery in 1980, and became a member of the National Auctioneers Association.

Sydes was married to the former Ann Driscoll. They had two daughters and a son: Elizabeth, Thomas Jr. and Tiffany.

Sydes died in Springfield, Virginia on June 20, 2015. He was survived by three children, nine grandchildren and his mother.

Anthony Sydes in Cheaper by the Dozen 1950

== Filmography ==
Year	Title	Role	Notes
1946	Claudia and David	Bobby Naughton	
1946	Johnny Comes Flying Home	Butch Cary	Uncredited
1947	It's a Joke, Son!	William	Uncredited
1947	It Happened on Fifth Avenue	Jackie Temple	Uncredited
1947	Miracle on 34th Street	Peter	Uncredited
1947	Driftwood	One of McDougal's Children	Uncredited
1947	Song of Love	Ferdinand Schumann	
1948	Sitting Pretty	Tony King	Uncredited
1948	Canon City	Jerry Bauer	
1949	Chicken Every Sunday	Oliver Hefferan	Uncredited
1949	Reign of Terror	Pierre's Son	Uncredited
1950	Cheaper by the Dozen	Fred Gilbreth	Uncredited
1950	Shadow on the Wall	Bobby	
1951	The Lady Says No	Boy Delivering Photo	Uncredited
1952	Belles on Their Toes	Dan Gilbreth	Uncredited
1952	Ellis in Freedomland	Male Model - Boy in Buster Brown Outfit	
1954	The Glenn Miller Story	Herbert Miller	Uncredited
1956	Lust for Life	Cor	Uncredited
1958	Gunsmoke in Tucson	Young Brazos	(final film role)
