= My Old Man's Place =

1971 film directed by Edwin Sherin

- Theatrical release poster
- Directed by: Edwin Sherin
- Screenplay by: Stanford Whitmore
- Based on: The Old Man's Place by John B. Sanford
- Produced by: Jack Solomon; Irving Temaner; Philip A. Waxman
- Starring: Arthur Kennedy; Mitchell Ryan; William Devane; Michael Moriarty; Topo Swope
- Cinematography: Richard C. Glouner
- Edited by: Ferris Webster
- Music by: Charles Gross
- Production company: Philip A. Waxman Productions Inc.
- Distributed by: Cinerama Releasing Corporation
- Release date: June 29, 1971
- Running time: 93 minutes
- Country: United States
- Language: English

My Old Man's Place (also known as Glory Boy or The Old Man's Place) is a 1971 American war drama film directed by Edwin Sherin and starring Arthur Kennedy, Mitchell Ryan, William Devane, Michael Moriarty, and Topo Swope. The film was based on the 1935 novel The Old Man's Place by John B. Sanford. It was released by Cinerama Releasing Corporation on June 29, 1971.

== Plot ==
After serving in Vietnam, two soldiers suffer from severe PTSD. They choose to spend a few days at a tranquil property that belonged to one of the men's fathers. They are joined by a psychotic sergeant who served tours in Vietnam. Strong personality conflicts occur.

== Cast ==
- Arthur Kennedy as Walter Pell
- Mitchell Ryan as Sergeant Martin Flood (as Mitch Ryan)
- William Devane as Jimmy Pilgrim
- Michael Moriarty as Trubee Pell
- Topo Swope as Helen
- Lloyd Gough as Dr. Paul
- Ford Rainey as Sheriff Coleman
- Peter Donat as Car Salesman
- Sandra Vacey as Darlene Pilgrim
- Paula Kauffman as "Bubbles"
- Eve Marchand as Streetwalker
- Bud Walls as Marine
- Harvey Brumfield as M.P.
