= Maidel Turner =

American actress (1888–1953)

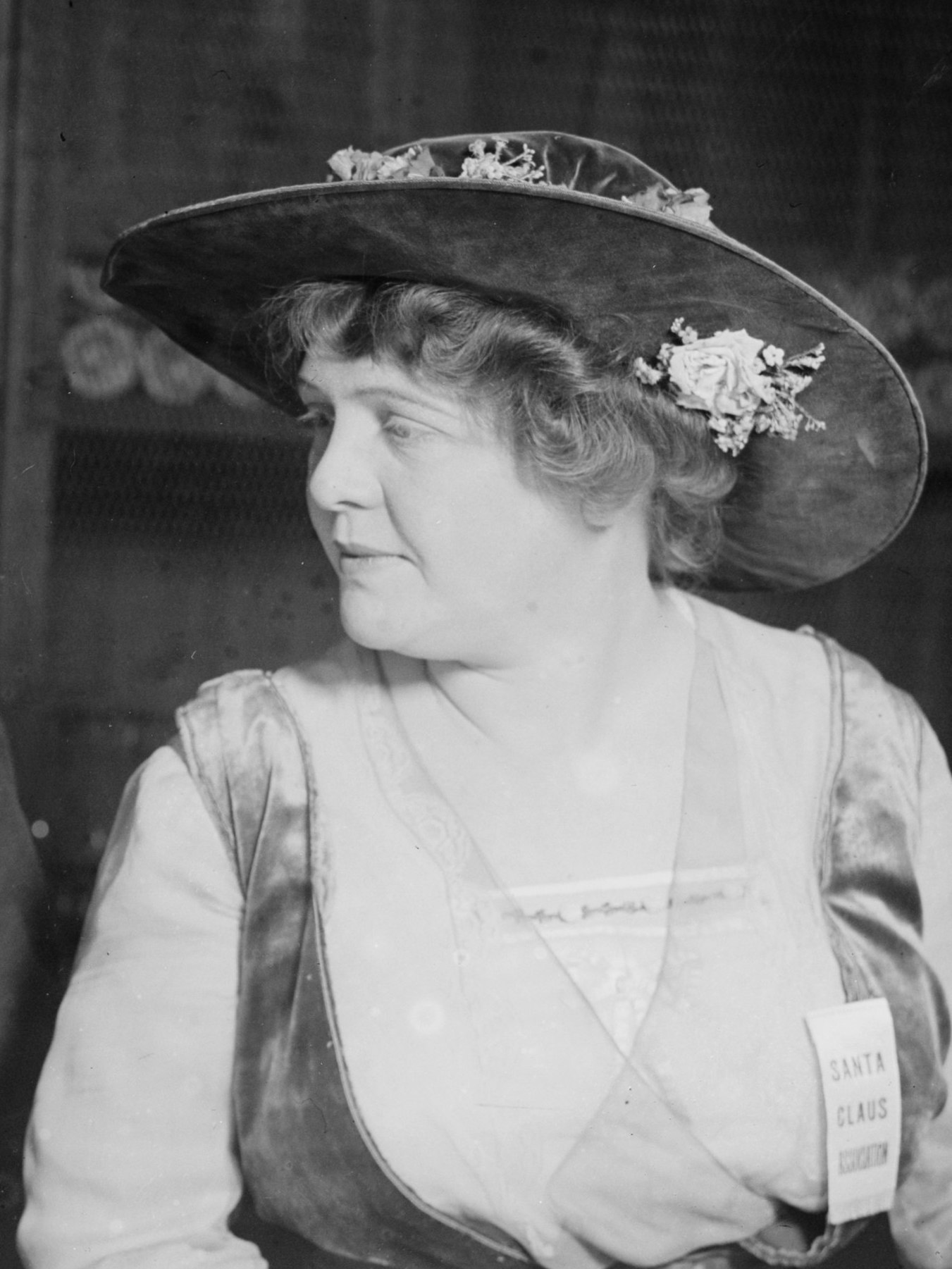
- Turner in 1914
- Born: May 12, 1888; Sherman, Texas, U.S.
- Died: April 12, 1953 (aged 64); Ocean Springs, Mississippi, U.S.
- Occupation: Actress

Maidel Turner (May 12, 1888 – April 12, 1953) was an American movie actress featured in almost 60 films between 1913 and 1951.

== Early years ==
Turner was born on May 12, 1888, in Sherman, Texas. Her parents were Mr. and Mrs. P. A. Turner. The family moved to Texarkana, Texas, when she was a small child, and he became a district judge there. She was educated at Chicago Musical College, Columbia University, and Hardin College.

== Career ==
Turner's work in films began as the leading lady of The Angel of the Slums (1913). She became a comical character actress as she aged. Prominent sound films in which she appeared include The Raven (1935), Palm Springs (1936), and State of the Union (1948).

When Turner was 30 years old she moved to New York and began a two-decade career on stage.

== Personal life and death ==
Following her time in college, Turner went back to Texarkana and married a cotton broker. In 1934 she married actor Fred Sumner. She died of a heart attack in Ocean Springs, Mississippi, on April 12, 1953, aged 72.

== Selected filmography ==
- The Boy Friend (1926) - Mrs. Wilson
- Olsen's Big Moment (1933) - Mrs. Van Allen (uncredited)
- The Barbarian (1933) - Flirty Dowager (uncredited)
- Another Language (1933) - Etta Hallam
- Beauty for Sale (1933) - Mrs. Gillespie, a Customer (uncredited)
- Only Yesterday (1933) - Party Guest (uncredited)
- The Worst Woman in Paris? (1933) - Mrs. Leda Jensen
- Fugitive Lovers (1934) - Little Boy's Mother (uncredited)
- It Happened One Night (1934) - last motel manager's wife (uncredited)
- Journal of a Crime (1934) - Stout Lady at Play Party (uncredited)
- A Modern Hero (1934) - Aunt Clara Weingartner
- A Very Honorable Guy (1934) - Mrs. Emerson (uncredited)
- Unknown Blonde (1934) - Mrs Parker
- Murder in Trinidad (1934) - Hysterical Woman (uncredited)
- The Merry Frinks (1934) - Mrs. Shinliver
- The Most Precious Thing in Life (1934) - Dean's Wife (uncredited)
- The Life of Vergie Winters (1934) - Ella Heenan
- Money Means Nothing (1934) - Mrs. Kerry Green
- Whom the Gods Destroy (1934) - Henrietta Crosland
- Million Dollar Ransom (1934) - Wife of Justice of the Peace (uncredited)
- Servants' Entrance (1934) - Dowager at Employment Agency (uncredited)
- She Had to Choose (1934) - Mrs. Cutler
- By Your Leave (1934) - Lady with Ancient Greek Costume (uncredited)
- Men of the Night (1934) - Mrs. Webbley
- Fugitive Lady (1934) - Mrs. Young (uncredited)
- Life Returns (1935) - Mrs. Vandergriff
- Sweepstake Annie (1935) - Friend of Mrs. Foster (uncredited)
- Night Life of the Gods (1935) - Burly Woman (uncredited)
- Mutiny Ahead (1935) - Kitty Vanderpool
- George White's 1935 Scandals (1935) - Audience Extra (uncredited)
- Society Fever (1935) - Mrs. Prouty
- The Raven (1935) - Harriet
- Dante's Inferno (1935) - Mme. Zucchini (uncredited)
- Atlantic Adventure (1935) - Mrs. Murdock (uncredited)
- Here Comes the Band (1935) - Chubby Lady (uncredited)
- Diamond Jim (1935) - Mrs. Perry (uncredited)
- The Gay Deception (1935) - Mrs. Dingledorf (uncredited)
- Dr. Socrates (1935) - Mary (uncredited)
- Bad Boy (1935) - Dowager with Ping Pong Racket (uncredited)
- Splendor (1935) - Mrs. Hicks (uncredited)
- Magnificent Obsession (1935) - Mrs. Martin (uncredited)
- The Bridge of Sighs (1936) - Mrs. Blaisdell
- Klondike Annie (1936) - Lydia Bowley (uncredited)
- Gentle Julia (1936) - Justice's Wife (uncredited)
- Show Boat (1936) - Mother (uncredited)
- Palm Springs (1936) - Mrs. Baxter (uncredited)
- And Sudden Death (1936) - Dodie Sloan
- Make Way for a Lady (1936) - Mrs. Jackson - Mildred's Mother (uncredited)
- She's Dangerous (1937) - Dowager (uncredited)
- Love Is News (1937) - Dowager Visiting Jail (uncredited)
- The Road Back (1937) - Member of Dinner Party (uncredited)
- Slim (1937) - Mrs. Johnson
- They Won't Forget (1937) - Stout Lady on Train (uncredited)
- Mr. Dodd Takes the Air (1937) - Lil Doremus (uncredited)
- Broadway Melody of 1938 (1937) - Boardinghouse Resident (uncredited)
- She Asked for It (1937) - Fat Woman (uncredited)
- State of the Union (1948) - Lulubelle Alexander
- Here Comes the Groom (1951) - Aunt Abby (final film role)
