= Robert Young (actor) =

American actor (1907–1998)

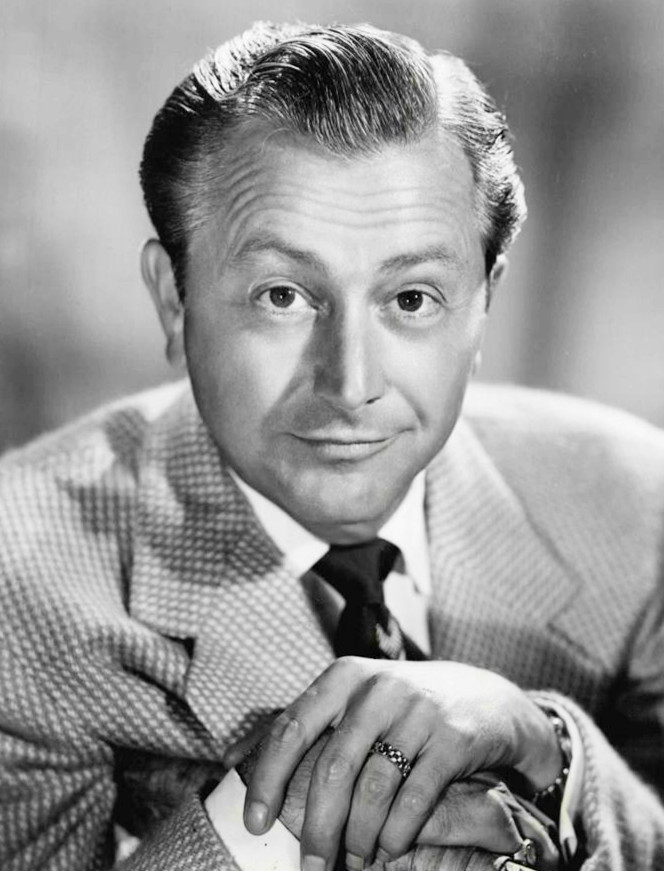
- Young in 1957
- Born: Robert George Young; February 22, 1907; Chicago, Illinois, U.S.
- Died: July 21, 1998 (aged 91); Westlake Village, California, U.S.
- Occupation: Actor
- Years active: 1927–1988
- Political party: Republican
- Spouse: Betty Henderson (m. 1933; died 1994)
- Children: 4
- Relatives: Marcia Ralston (sister-in-law)

Robert George Young (February 22, 1907 – July 21, 1998) was an American film, television, and radio actor. His biggest success came with his leading roles as Jim Anderson, the father character, in the sitcom Father Knows Best (1954-1960; CBS, then NBC, then CBS again) and the physician Marcus Welby in Marcus Welby, M.D. (1969; 1976 ABC).

Young also appeared in over 100 films, primarily as leading man or second lead during the 1930s and 1940s, including Secret Agent (1931), Northwest Passage (1940), H. M. Pulham, Esq. (1941), The Canterville Ghost (1944), The Enchanted Cottage (1945), and Crossfire (1947).

== Early life ==
Young was born in Chicago, the son of an Irish immigrant father, Thomas E. Young, and an American mother, Margaret Fyfe. While Young was a child, the family moved to various locations within the U.S., including Seattle, and Los Angeles, where Young was a student at Abraham Lincoln High School. After graduation, he studied and performed at the Pasadena Playhouse while working odd jobs and appearing in bit parts in silent films. While touring with a stock company producing "The Ship", Young was discovered by a Metro-Goldwyn-Mayer talent scout who signed the fledgling actor to a contract. Young made his sound film debut for Fox Film Corporation in the 1931 Charlie Chan film Black Camel, starring Warner Oland.

== Film career ==
Young appeared in over 100 films between 1928 and 1952. In spite of having a "tier B" status, he co-starred with some of the studio's most illustrious actresses, such as Katharine Hepburn, Margaret Sullavan, Norma Shearer, Joan Crawford, Susan Hayward, Dorothy McGuire, Helen Hayes, Luise Rainer, Hedy Lamarr, Helen Twelvetrees and (unrelated) Loretta Young. Most of his assignments consisted of short B movies, also known as "programmers," which required brief two- to three-week shooting schedules. Actors who were relegated to such hectic routines appeared, as Young did, in some six to eight movies per year.

As an MGM contract player, Young was obligated to accept any film assigned to him or risk being placed on suspension—and many actors who were placed on suspension were prohibited from earning a salary from any endeavor at all, even those unrelated to the film industry. In 1936, MGM summarily loaned Young to Gaumont British in the U.K. for two films; the first, Secret Agent, was directed by Alfred Hitchcock, while the other, It's Love Again, co-starred Jessie Matthews. While in England, he was convinced that MGM intended to terminate his contract, but he was mistaken.

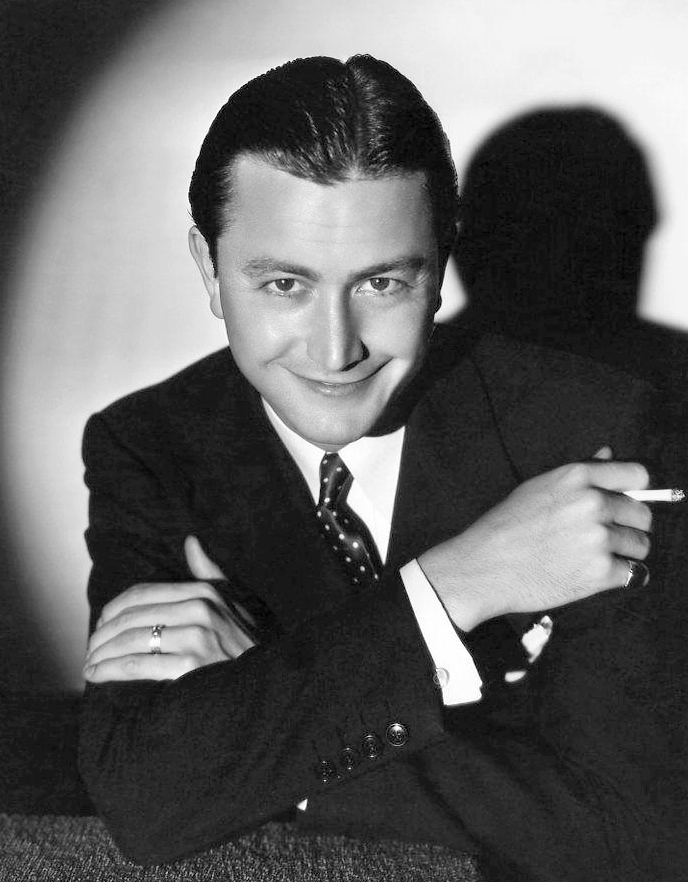
Young in 1934

He unexpectedly received one of his most rewarding roles late in his MGM career, in H.M. Pulham, Esq. (1941), which also benefited from one of Hedy Lamarr's most effective performances. He once remarked that he was assigned only those roles which Robert Montgomery and other A-list actors had rejected.

After his contract with MGM expired, Young starred in light comedies and dramas for studios such as 20th Century Fox, United Artists, and RKO Radio Pictures. From 1943, Young had more challenging roles in films like Claudia, The Enchanted Cottage, They Won't Believe Me, The Second Woman, and Crossfire. His portrayals of unsympathetic characters in several of these later films—which had seldom been the case in his MGM pictures—were applauded by numerous critics.

In 1949, he returned to MGM briefly to appear in That Forsyte Woman with Errol Flynn and Greer Garson. He played the second lead in Secret of the Incas (1954) starring Charlton Heston, the film upon which Raiders of the Lost Ark was subsequently loosely based. Despite the picture's superior quality while being shot on location at Machu Picchu, it was the last feature film in which he appeared. Young's career had begun an incremental and almost imperceptible decline, despite a propitious beginning as a freelance actor without the nurturing of a major studio. He had continued starring as a leading man in the late 1940s and early 1950s, but only in mediocre films, and occasionally playing supporting roles in important films. Then, he subsequently disappeared from the silver screen—only to reappear, successfully, several years later on a much smaller one.

=== Television career ===
Young in his role as Dr. Marcus Welby, 1973

Today, Young is perhaps best remembered as the affable insurance salesman in the long-running popular sitcom Father Knows Best (1949–1954 on radio, 1954–1960 on television), for which he and his co-star Jane Wyatt won several Emmy Awards. Elinor Donahue ("Betty"), Billy Gray ("Bud"), and Lauren Chapin ("Kathy") played the Anderson children in the television version.

Young then created, produced, and starred with Ford Rainey and Constance Moore in the nostalgic CBS comedy series Window on Main Street (1961–1962).

Young followed that by playing the iconic title character in the successful television series Marcus Welby, M.D., where he portrayed a stern but devoted and caring physician, co-starring James Brolin as Dr. Steve Kiley, his young and occasionally impetuous partner in their joint medical practice. The series ran for seven seasons (1969–1976), earning Young an Emmy in 1970 for best leading actor in a drama series.

The series became one of the most popular medical dramas in American television history. During the 1970 television year, Marcus Welby, M.D. ranked first among all U.S. television series, making it the first ABC program to finish a season as the nation's highest-rated television program.

He shared the stage on The Dick Cavett Show with Jimi Hendrix in September 1969.

Until 1982, he made numerous television commercials for Sanka coffee.

The popular phrase "I'm not a doctor, but I play one on TV" from a commercial for Vicks 44 cough medicine has been erroneously attributed to Young due to his Marcus Welby, M.D. fame. It was actually spoken by actor Chris Robinson and then by Peter Bergman during the 1980s.

== Personal life and death ==
Young was married to Betty Henderson for 61 years from 1933 until her death in 1994. They had four daughters: Carol (Proffitt), Barbara (Beebe), Kathy (Young), and Betty Lou (Gleason). They also had six grandchildren and nine great-grandchildren.

Despite his trademark portrayal of happy, well-adjusted characters, Young's bitterness toward Hollywood casting practices never diminished, and he suffered from depression and alcoholism, culminating in a suicide attempt in January 1991. Later, he spoke candidly about his personal problems in an effort to encourage others to seek help. The Robert Young Community Mental Health Center is named after Young in honor of his work toward passage of the 708 Illinois Tax Referendum, which established a property tax to support mental health programs in his home state. The center started in Rock Island, Illinois, and now has sites in both Iowa and Illinois, as part of the Quad-City metropolitan area.

Young died of respiratory failure at his Westlake Village, California, home on July 21, 1998.

He has three stars on the Hollywood Walk of Fame; for film (located at 6933 Hollywood Boulevard), television (6358 Hollywood Boulevard), and radio (1660 Vine Street).

== Filmography ==
Film
Year	Title	Role	Notes
1928	The Godless Girl	Student	Uncredited
1931	The Black Camel	Jimmy Bradshaw	A Warner Oland / Charlie Chan film
1931	The Sin of Madelon Claudet	Dr. Lawrence Claudet	Alternative title: The Lullaby
1931	Hell Divers	Graham – Pilot Reporting Missing Airplanes	Uncredited
1931	The Guilty Generation	Marco Ricca—aka John Smith	
1932	The Wet Parade	Kip Tarleton	
1932	New Morals for Old	Ralph Thomas	
1932	Unashamed	Dick Ogden	
1932	Strange Interlude	Gordon Evans (as a Young Man)	Alternative title: Strange Interval
1932	The Kid from Spain	Ricardo	
1933	Men Must Fight	Lt. Geoffrey Aiken	
1933	Today We Live	Claude	
1933	Hell Below	Lieutenant (JG) Ed "Brick" Walters	
1933	Tugboat Annie	Alexander "Alec" Brennan	
1933	Saturday's Millions	Jim Fowler	
1933	The Right to Romance	Bobby Preble	
1934	Carolina	Will Connelly	
1934	Spitfire	John Stafford	
1934	The House of Rothschild	Captain Fitzroy	
1934	Lazy River	William "Bill" Drexel	
1934	Hollywood Party	Himself, Radio Announcer	Uncredited
1934	Whom the Gods Destroy	Jack Forrester	
1934	Paris Interlude	Pat Wells	
1934	Death on the Diamond	Larry Kelly	
1934	The Band Plays On	Tony Ferrera	
1934	La ciudad de cartón	Himself	
1935	West Point of the Air	Little Mike Stone	
1935	Vagabond Lady	Tony Spear	
1935	Calm Yourself	Preston 'Pat' Patton	
1935	Red Salute	Uncle Sam	
1935	Remember Last Night?	Tony Milburn	
1935	The Bride Comes Home	Jack Bristow	
1936	It's Love Again	Peter Carlton	
1936	The Three Wise Guys	Joe Hatcher	
1936	Secret Agent	Robert Marvin	
1936	The Bride Walks Out	Hugh McKenzie	
1936	Sworn Enemy	Henry 'Hank' Sherman	
1936	The Longest Night	Charley Phelps	
1936	Stowaway	Tommy Randall	
1937	Dangerous Number	Henry 'Hank' Medhill	
1937	I Met Him in Paris	Gene Anders	
1937	Married Before Breakfast	Tom Wakefield	
1937	The Emperor's Candlesticks	Grand Duke Peter	
1937	The Bride Wore Red	Rudi Pal	
1937	Navy Blue and Gold	Roger "Rog" Ash	
1938	Paradise for Three	Fritz Hagedorn	Alternative title: Romance for Three
1938	Three Comrades	Gottfried Lenz	
1938	Josette	Pierre Brassard	
1938	The Toy Wife	Andre Vallaire	
1938	Rich Man, Poor Girl	Bill Harrison	
1938	The Shining Hour	David Linden	
1939	Honolulu	Brooks Mason / George Smith	
1939	Bridal Suite	Neil McGill	
1939	Maisie	Charles "Slim" Martin	
1939	Miracles for Sale	Michael "Mike" Morgan	
1940	Northwest Passage	Langdon Towne	
1940	Florian	Anton Erban	
1940	The Mortal Storm	Fritz Marberg	
1940	Sporting Blood	Myles Vanders	
1940	Dr. Kildare's Crisis	Douglas "Doug" Lamont	
1941	Western Union	Richard Blake	
1941	The Trial of Mary Dugan	Jimmy Blake	
1941	Lady Be Good	Edward "Eddie" Crane	
1941	Married Bachelor	Randolph Haven	
1941	H. M. Pulham, Esq.	Harry Moulton Pulham	
1942	Joe Smith, American	Joe Smith	
1942	Cairo	Homer Smith, aka Juniper Jones	
1942	Journey for Margaret	John Davis	
1943	Claudia	David Naughton	
1943	Slightly Dangerous	Bob Stuart	
1943	Sweet Rosie O'Grady	Sam MacKeever	
1944	The Canterville Ghost	Cuffy Williams	
1945	The Enchanted Cottage	Oliver Bradford	
1945	Those Endearing Young Charms	Lt. Hurley 'Hank' Travers	
1946	Claudia and David	David Naughton	
1946	The Searching Wind	Alex Hazen	
1946	Lady Luck	Larry Scott	
1947	They Won't Believe Me	Larry Ballentine	
1947	Crossfire	Finlay	
1948	Relentless	Nick Buckley	
1948	Sitting Pretty	Harry King	
1949	Adventure in Baltimore	Dr. Andrew Sheldon	
1949	That Forsyte Woman	Philip Bosinney	Alternative title: The Forsyte Saga
1949	Bride for Sale	Steve Adams	
1949	And Baby Makes Three	Vernon "Vern" Walsh	
1950	The Second Woman	Jeff Cohalan	
1951	Goodbye, My Fancy	Doctor James Merrill	
1952	The Half-Breed	Dan Craig	
1954	The Big Moment	Narrator	
1954	Secret of the Incas	Stanley Moorehead	Final film

Television
Year	Title	Role	Notes
1954	Ford Television Theatre	Tom Warren	1 episode
1954–1960	Father Knows Best	Jim Anderson	203 episodes
1955	Climax!	Lieutenant Commander Knowles	1 episode
1961	Window on Main Street	Cameron Garrett Brooks	17 episodes
1965	Dr. Kildare	Dr. Gilbert Winfield	1 episode
1965	Bob Hope Presents the Chrysler Theatre: The Admiral	Admiral Matt Callahan	1 episode
1968	The Name of the Game	Herman Allison	1 episode
1969–1976	Marcus Welby, M.D.	Dr. Marcus Welby	170 episodes
1972	All My Darling Daughters	Judge Charles Raleigh	Television film
1973	My Darling Daughters' Anniversary	Judge Charles Raleigh	Television film
1977	Father Knows Best Reunion	Jim Anderson	Television film
1977	Father Knows Best: Home for Christmas	Jim Anderson	Television film
1978	Little Women	Grandpa James Lawrence	Television film
1984	The Return of Marcus Welby, M.D.	Dr. Marcus Welby	Television film
1987	American Masters	Edward "Eddie" Crane	1 episode
1987	Mercy or Murder?	Roswell Gilbert	Television film
1987	A Conspiracy of Love	Joe Woldarski	Television film
1988	Marcus Welby, M.D.: A Holiday Affair	Dr. Marcus Welby	Television film (final appearance)

Radio
Year	Title	Role	Notes
1949–1954	Father Knows Best	Jim Anderson	
1943	Suspense		Episode: "A Friend to Alexander"
1946	Suspense		Episode: "The Night Reveals"
1952	Suspense		Episode: "The Frameup"

== Awards and nominations ==
Year	Award	Result	Category	Film or series
1956	Emmy Award	Nominated	Best Actor – Continuing Performance	Father Knows Best
1957	Emmy Award	Won	Best Continuing Performance by an Actor in a Dramatic Series	Father Knows Best
1958	Emmy Award	Won	Best Continuing Performance by an Actor in a Leading Role in a Dramatic or Comedy Series	Father Knows Best
1959	Emmy Award	Nominated	Best Actor in a Leading Role (Continuing Character) in a Comedy Series	Father Knows Best
1970	Emmy Award	Won	Outstanding Continued Performance by an Actor in a Leading Role in a Dramatic Series	Marcus Welby, M.D.
1971	Emmy Award	Nominated	Outstanding Performance by an Actor in a Supporting Role in Drama	Vanished
1971	Emmy Award	Nominated	Outstanding Continued Performance by an Actor in a Leading Role in a Dramatic Series	Marcus Welby, M.D.
1972	Emmy Award	Nominated	Outstanding Continued Performance by an Actor in a Leading Role in a Dramatic Series	Marcus Welby, M.D.
1970	Golden Globe Award	Nominated	Best TV Actor – Drama	Marcus Welby, M.D.
1971	Golden Globe Award	Nominated	Best TV Actor – Drama	Marcus Welby, M.D.
1972	Golden Globe Award	Won	Best TV Actor – Drama	Marcus Welby, M.D.
1973	Golden Globe Award	Nominated	Best TV Actor – Drama	Marcus Welby, M.D.
1974	Golden Globe Award	Nominated	Best TV Actor – Drama	Marcus Welby, M.D.
2003	TV Land Award	Nominated	Classic TV Doctor of the Year	Marcus Welby, M.D.
