= Palm Springs (1936 film) =

1936 film

- Directed by: Aubrey Scotto
- Written by: Joseph Fields (screenwriter)
- Based on: Myles Connolly's short story "Lady Smith" in Good Housekeeping
- Produced by: Adolf Zukor
- Starring: Frances Langford; Guy Standing; Ernest Cossart
- Cinematography: James Van Trees
- Edited by: Robert L. Simpson
- Music by: Ralph Rainger & Leo Robin; Mack Gordon & Harry Revel; Dorothy Fields & James McHugh
- Production company: Walter Wanger Productions
- Distributed by: Paramount Pictures
- Release date: June 5, 1936
- Running time: 72 minutes
- Country: United States
- Language: English
- Budget: $328,818
- Box office: $225,637

Palm Springs (alternate title: Palm Springs Affair) is a 1936 American comedy drama film directed by Aubrey Scotto and starring Frances Langford, Guy Standing and Ernest Cossart. It also features an early performance by future star David Niven. It was produced by Walter Wanger for distribution by Paramount Pictures.

== Plot ==
A father and daughter who love to gamble throw a party in honor of her leaving to attend finishing school. However, when she gets to the school she is caught gambling and is promptly expelled.

While trying to locate her father in Palm Springs, California, she meets a cowboy named Slim and a wealthy gentleman named George Brittel, whose aunt Letty is totally against gambling. Nevertheless, she and George bet and before they know it they're having dinner at a fancy restaurant. In the gambling room, Joan discovers her father gambling and finds out the truth behind their financial situation, so she decides to marry George for his money. Complications ensue when she changes her identity to Lady Sylvia of Dustin and she realizes the cowboy is the one she is in love with.

== Cast ==
- Frances Langford as Joan
- Guy Standing as Capt. Smith
- David Niven as Brittel
- Spring Byington as Aunt Letty
- Smith Ballew as Slim
- E. E. Clive as Morgan
- Sterling Holloway
- Grady Sutton
- Ann Doran
- Kirby Grant Hoon
- Fuzzy Knight
- Etta McDaniel
- Jack Mower
- Sarah Edwards
- Cyril Ring
- Lee Phelps
- Eddie Tamblyn
- Fred "Snowflake" Toones
- Maidel Turner

== Reception ==
The film recorded a loss of $154,089.
