= Patricia Ryan (actress) =

American actress (1921–1949)

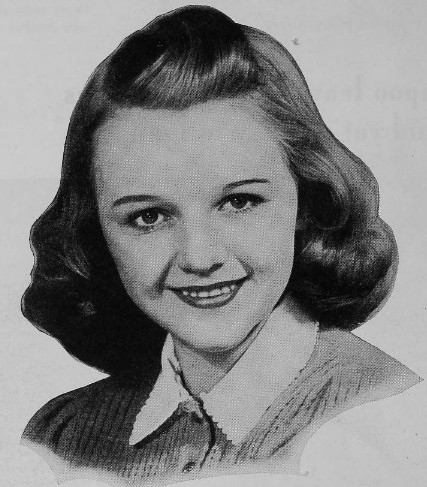
- Patricia Ryan in 1943
- Born: February 25, 1921; London, England
- Died: February 15, 1949 (aged 27); New York, New York, U.S.
- Occupation: Actress
- Spouse: George Robert Gibson (1945 - 1949, her death)

Patricia Ryan (February 25, 1921 – February 15, 1949) was a child and later young adult performer and an actress in old-time radio. She was taken ill during an evening broadcast and died the next day.

== Early years ==
Ryan's father John Ryan was a doughboy in World War I. During his time in London he met Edith Lottie wood, and they married in 1916. Their daughter, Patricia, was born about six weeks before they boarded a ship to emigrate to the United States. She worked in vaudeville when she was 7 years old. She also sang in the choir and played on the basketball team of St. Michael's Church.

Ryan had two sisters Pauline and Juanita, born in 1918 and 1926 respectively.

== Radio ==
Ryan began working in radio when she was 4 years old. (Another source says that she "started at the age of 8.") Her best-known role was probably that of Kathleen, Henry Aldrich's girlfriend on The Aldrich Family. During the 1934-1935 radio season, Ryan "wrote, directed and acted in a radio play presented over CBS."

Ryan's roles in other programs are shown in the table below.

| Program | Role |
|---|---|
| The Adventures of Helen and Mary | Mary |
| Big Sister | Sue |
| Claudia and David | Claudia |
| Joyce Jordan, M.D. | Myra Lee |
| Little Women | Amy |
| The Parker Family | Elly Parker |
| Skippy | Carol |

As a child, she was also a member of the casts of Our Barn Let's Pretend.

== Public service ==
During World War II, Ryan worked two years as a nurse's aide after receiving her diploma from Misericordia Hospital in Manhattan, New York. She also was a hostess at the Stage Door Canteen. On a typical day, she worked at a hospital from 7:15 a.m. until noon, spent the afternoon on radio and visited with soldiers at the canteen in the evenings.

== Film ==
Ryan had a screen test with Metro-Goldwyn-Mayer in 1942.

== Personal life ==
Ryan married George Robert Gibson, seaman in the Royal Navy, on August 5, 1945 in Manhattan.

== Death ==
On February 14, 1949, Ryan was performing on a Cavalcade of America broadcast when, as reported in a United Press wire service story, she was "stricken with a splitting headache."

The UP story related: "The show had been on only a few minutes when she [Ryan] clutched her head and swayed. She was helped to a chair and two other actresses alternately read her lines. Before the program ended she had recovered enough to resume her part, but still complained of an extremely severe headache." The next morning, her husband found her dead in their apartment. Her death was attributed to a cerebral hemorrhage.

Coincidentally, in the episode, "Valentine for Sophie," Ryan's character was a woman who suffered from severe headaches. In another ironic twist, Ryan had suffered an on-set injury 15 years earlier. As she was preparing for a radio program, an overhead microphone fell on her head, knocking her out. She was revived two minutes before air time and carried through, acting her part in the program despite having what she called "a slight headache."

Services for Ryan were held at Walter Cooke's Chapel in New York City on February 18, 1949.
