= Claudia (1943 film) =

1943 film by Edmund Goulding

- Theatrical release poster
- Directed by: Edmund Goulding
- Screenplay by: Morrie Ryskind
- Based on: Claudia; 1941 play by Rose Franken
- Produced by: William Perlberg
- Starring: Dorothy McGuire; Robert Young; Ina Claire; Reginald Gardiner; Olga Baclanova; Jean Howard
- Cinematography: Leon Shamroy
- Edited by: Robert L. Simpson
- Music by: Alfred Newman
- Production company: 20th Century Fox
- Distributed by: 20th Century Fox
- Release date: November 4, 1943
- Running time: 91 minutes
- Country: United States
- Language: English
- Box office: $2.5 million (US rentals)

Claudia is a 1943 American comedy-drama film directed by Edmund Goulding, and written by Morrie Ryskind. The film stars Dorothy McGuire, Robert Young, Ina Claire, Reginald Gardiner, Olga Baclanova, and Jean Howard. The film was released on November 4, 1943, by 20th Century Fox. The film was based on a Broadway play of the same name from 1941. It is followed by a sequel in 1946 Claudia and David.

Robert Young said of his co-star, “She'd done it on Broadway and this was mostly a photographed play. Ina Claire was wonderful as her mother. It did sensational business and Fox requested a sequel. Dorothy was aghast and said she'd never do a sequel, but technically, she was under contract to Selznick and he simply put his foot down and Claudia and David duly appeared in 1946 and was almost as big a hit.”

== Plot ==
Child bride Claudia Naughton (Dorothy McGuire) has made life difficult for her husband David (Robert Young) because she can't stand living so far away from her mother. She's also afraid her husband doesn't find her desirable enough. To remedy both situations, she plans to sell their farm to an opera singer so they'll have to move back to the city near her mother, and she tries to make her husband jealous by flirting with a neighbor. Eventually, Claudia has to learn to grow when she discovers that she's about to become a mother and that her own mother is gravely ill.

== Cast ==
- Dorothy McGuire as Claudia Naughton
- Robert Young as David Naughton
- Ina Claire as Mrs. Brown
- Reginald Gardiner as Jerry Seymour
- Olga Baclanova as Madame Daruschka
- Jean Howard as Julia
- Frank Tweddell as Fritz
- Elsa Janssen as Bertha
