= Rose Franken =

American dramatist

- Born: Rose Dorothy Lewin; December 28, 1895; Gainesville, Texas, U.S.
- Died: June 22, 1988 (aged 92); Tucson, Arizona U.S.
- Occupations: Author, playwright, screenwriter
- Known for: Claudia stories
- Spouse(s): Sigmund W.A. Franken (1913–1932, his death); William Brown Meloney (1905–1971)

Rose Dorothy Franken (December 28, 1895 – June 22, 1988) was an American writer and playwright best known for her Claudia stories, plus the books, plays and films, based on them.

== Early years ==
Born Rose Dorothy Lewin in Gainesville, Texas, Franken was the youngest child of Michael and Hannah Younker Lewin. When Franken was 12, the family moved to New York; there, she attended the Ethical Culture Fieldston School. After graduation, she planned to attend Barnard College but was wed instead.

== Career ==
Franken began writing after her second child was born. The editor to whom she sent her early work liked it and asked for more, thus beginning her career as a writer.

Her books included Of Great Riches (1937), Strange Victory (1939), Claudia: The Story of A Marriage (1939), and When Doctors Disagree (1940). From her novel Claudia and a Redbook magazine serial story, "Claudia and David," Franken developed a play, a radio series (Claudia), and two films. These works led to a television series, Claudia (1952).

In 1963, Doubleday published Franken's autobiography, When All Is Said and Done.

Franken's first play was Another Language (1932), which was the basis for the film Another Language (1933). Her next play was Claudia (1941).

== Personal life ==
On September 1, 1913, she married Sigmund Walter Anthony Franken, an oral surgeon who died on December 17, 1932. They had three children, including physicist Peter Franken. On April 27, 1937, she married writer William Brown Meloney. He died on May 4, 1971.

She was one of the artists and writers to visit Melrose Plantation on the Cane River in Louisiana.

== Death ==
Franken died on June 22, 1988, in Tucson, Arizona, at age 92. She was survived by her sons, Paul, John, and Peter; four grandchildren, and one great-grandchild.

== Selected filmography ==
- Claudia and David (1960) (TV movie)
- Claudia (1960) (TV movie)
- Another Language (1957) (TV movie)
- Mr. Dooley, Jnr. (1953) (TV movie)
- Another Language (1952) (TV movie)
- The Secret Heart (1946)
- Claudia and David (1943)
- Claudia (1943)
- Made for Each Other (1939)
- Beloved Enemy (1936)
- Next Time We Live (1936)
- Dante's Inferno (1935)
- Alias Mary Dow (1935)
- Storm Over the Andes (1935)
- Elinor Norton (1934)
- Another Language (1933)
