= Jean Howard =

American actress & photographer (1910–2000)

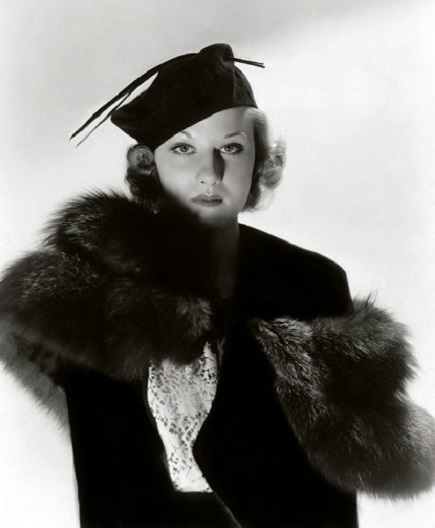
- Howard in 1930s
- Born: Ernestine Hill; October 13, 1910; Longview, Texas, U.S.
- Died: March 20, 2000 (aged 89); Beverly Hills, California, U.S.
- Resting place: Hollywood Forever Cemetery, Hollywood, California, U.S.
- Occupation: Actress · Photographer
- Known for: Photography
- Spouses: Charles K. Feldman (m. 1935; div. 1947) Tony Santoro (m. 1973)

Jean Howard (born Ernestine Hill; October 13, 1910 – March 20, 2000) was an American actress and professional photographer. She was born in Longview, Texas and died in Beverly Hills, California.

== Early years ==
Howard was born Ernestine Hill on October 13, 1910, in Longview, Texas. Her father left her mother shortly thereafter and she lived with her mother. Her mother died when Ernestine was 13 years old. She then joined her father and stepmother in Dallas, from where her father traveled as a salesman.

When she was a teenager, she accompanied her nephew to a photographic studio to have his portrait taken. Paul Mahoney, the photographer, took her photograph, which led to his becoming her teacher and mentor. "Young, eager, and frustrated," Howard changed her name to Ernestine Mahoney and began participating in beauty contests and fashion shows. Her father paid her expenses while Mahoney taught her. Howard acted in local theatrical productions before she went to Hollywood in the late 1920s and became a part of the Studio Club, a group for women who hoped to act in films.

== Career ==
Howard's time as a Goldwyn Girl began when she responded to an advertisement. Her film debut came in Whoopee! (1930). Florenz Ziegfeld Jr. selected Howard as one of four women from that film to appear in his upcoming musical production, Smiles, but she had to go to Dallas after her father died in an automobile accident. Ziegfeld gave her a role in the 1931 edition of the Ziegfeld Follies, billing her as Jean Howard. She next appeared in Ziegfeld's Hot-Cha (1932).

A contract with MGM resulted in Howard's appearing in The Prizefighter and the Lady and Broadway to Hollywood, Dancing Lady (all 1933). She also appeared in Break of Hearts (1935), The Final Hour (1936), and Claudia (1943).

Howard studied photography at the Los Angeles Art Center. She appeared on Broadway in productions The Age of Innocence with Franchot Tone and Evensong.

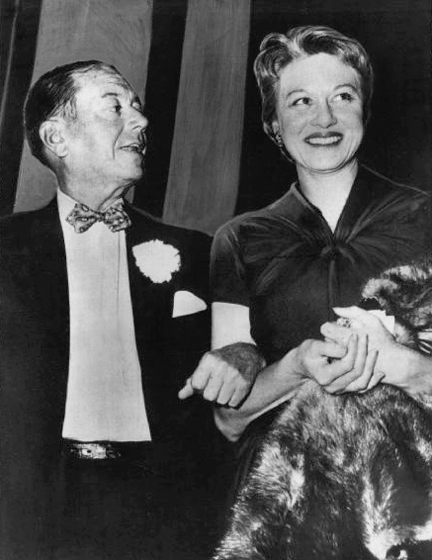
Howard and Cole Porter in early 1954

She often used her camera to capture moments from Hollywood during the 1940s and 1950s. She photographed parties, gatherings, sports tournaments, etc., shooting Tyrone Power, Gene Tierney, Richard Burton, Cole Porter, Judy Garland, Grace Kelly, Hedy Lamarr, Jennifer Jones, Deborah Kerr, Geraldine Page, Ethel Barrymore, Laurence Olivier, Marilyn Monroe, James Dean, Ali Kahn, Van Johnson, Marti Stevens, Charles K. Feldman and Vivien Leigh. Two books of her photographs were published, Jean Howard's Hollywood: A Photo Memoir (1989) and Travels With Cole Porter (1991).

== Personal life and death ==
Howard married Hollywood talent agent Charles K. Feldman on August 25, 1934, in Harrison, New York, and they divorced in 1948. The couple continued to regularly live together until her travels to Europe with Cole Porter in the mid-1950s. She conceived with Feldman once, but lost the pregnancy and never had children. She married Tony Santoro, a musician from Italy, in 1973.

Howard died on March 20, 2000, in her Beverly Hills, California, home. She was buried in Hollywood Forever Cemetery.

== Sources ==
- The Stars of Hollywood Forever: 1901-2006 (ISBN 0917083601/ISBN 978-0917083600/ASIN: B0006SA7KO); Publisher: Tony Scott Publishing; 1st edition (2001)
