= John Swope (photographer) =

American photographer (1908-1979)

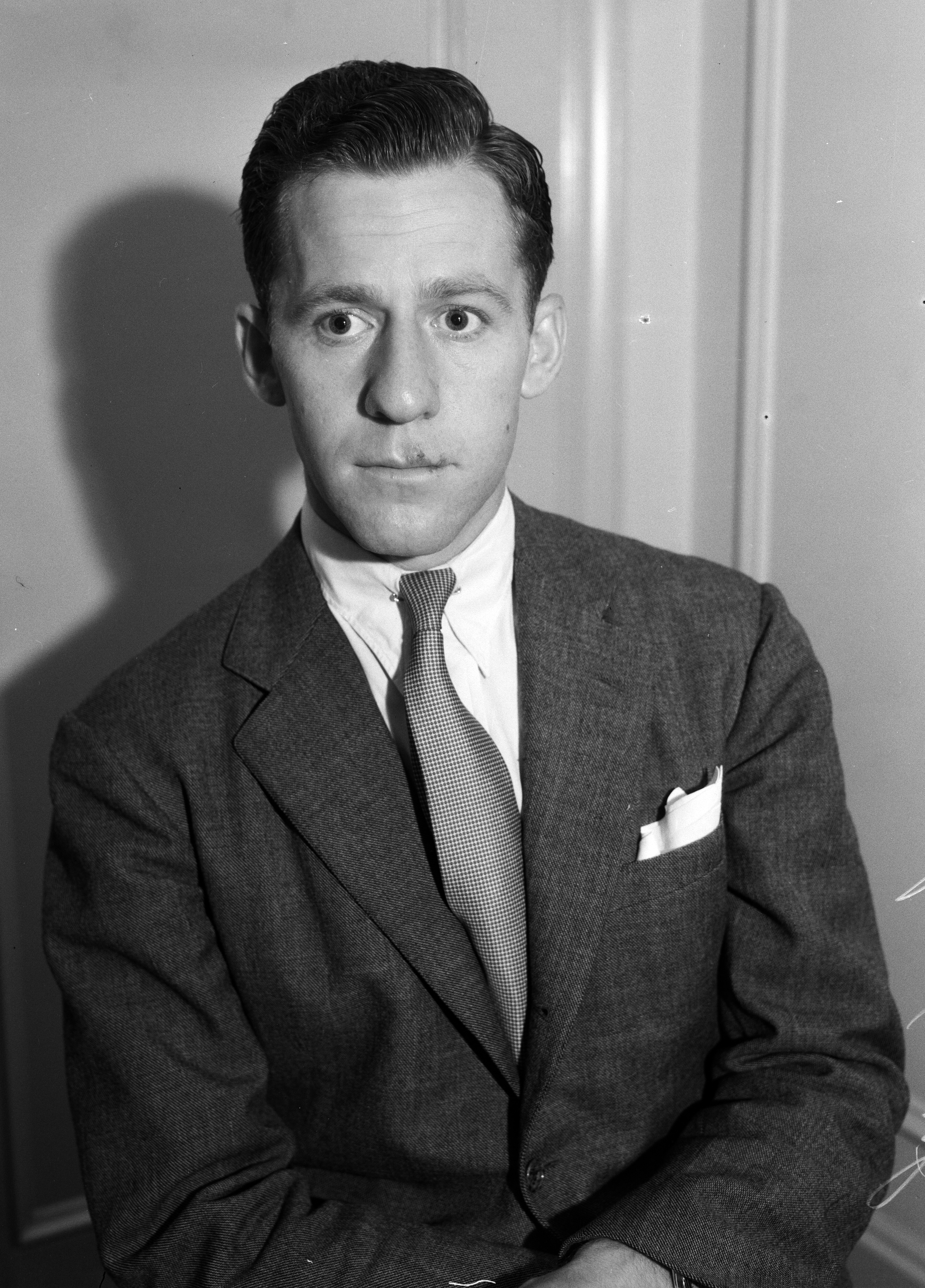
- Swope in 1934
- Born: August 23, 1908; New Brunswick, New Jersey, U.S.
- Died: May 11, 1979 (aged 70); Los Angeles, California, U.S.
- Known for: Photography
- Spouse: Dorothy McGuire (m. 1943)
- Children: 2, including Topo Swope
- Website: www.craigkrullgallery.com/Swope.J/

John Swope (August 23, 1908 – May 11, 1979) was a photographer for Life, and a commercial pilot who trained United States Army Air Forces pilots during World War II.

== Biography ==
He was born in New Brunswick, New Jersey in 1908.

He attended Harvard University in 1930. There, he joined the theatrical group University Players, where Henry Fonda, James Stewart, Margaret Sullavan and Joshua Logan were also members.

His interest in photography began when he brought a camera to a yacht race from Los Angeles to Hawaii in 1936.

Together with Leland Hayward and John H. Connelly, he co-founded Southwest Airways (no connection to the present day Southwest Airlines), a company that developed the Thunderbird Fields, which trained thousands of military pilots during the Second World War.

He was married to actress Dorothy McGuire in 1943 until his death on May 11, 1979. Together they had two children.

== Career ==
He started his career by documenting federal housing projects, a part of Franklin D. Roosevelt's New Deal Program.

1936 — He worked as an assistant to Leland Heyward.

1938 — He was commissioned to photograph the work of nurses in Harlem and the Lower East Side by Henry Street Settlement House.

1939 — He was assigned by Harper's Bazaar in South America with Joshua Logan.

1941 — He began training Aviation cadets in Thunderbird Airfield right after he joined the Army.

1942 — He collaborated with John Steinbeck on an illustrated book, Bombs Away: The Story of a Bomber Team, which documented the training of army cadets.

1945 — He joined the Naval Reserve as a photographer. His first assignment, in June 1945, was to photograph an overseas military flight from Maryland to Paris.

1946 — Began his freelancing career again after his discharge from the Navy. He produced a theatrical play at the La Jolla Playhouse.

1975 — Photographed palaces of the maharajahs in India for the James Ivory book, Autobiography of a Princess

== Influences ==
John Swope broke the mold of Hollywood's glamour shots when he burst in the scene in 1936. What makes his work unique is how he used available light, shot from unusual angles, and informal portraits. This might come from his influence of Mondrian's use of linear space.

== Exhibitions ==
- A Letter from Japan: The Photographs of John Swope - taken in August 1945 documents the devastation caused by World War II. This photographic essay was complemented by a 144-page letter to his wife Dorothy McGuire describing in detail his emotional experience when shooting these images.
- Swope's photography has been the subject of five solo exhibitions at Craig Krull Gallery in Santa Monica, California; "Trees" in 2006, "New York" in 2005, "Photographs" in 2003, "Camera over Hollywood" in 2001, and "A View from Above" in 1996.

== Books ==
- Camera over Hollywood: Photographs by John Swope, 1936-1938 (published in 1939)
