= Dorothy McGuire =

American actress (1916–2001)

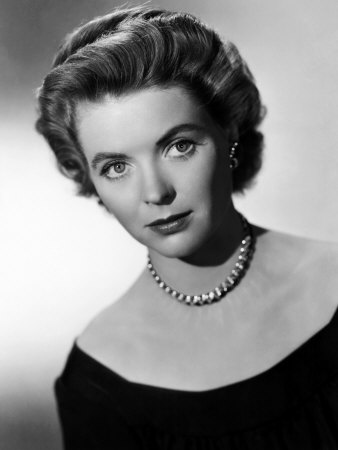
- Publicity photo of McGuire, 1940s
- Born: Dorothy Hackett McGuire; June 14, 1916; Omaha, Nebraska, U.S.
- Died: September 13, 2001 (aged 85); Santa Monica, California, U.S.
- Other name: Dorothy McGuire Swope
- Years active: 1937–1990
- Known for: Swiss Family Robinson; Gentleman's Agreement; Friendly Persuasion; The Enchanted Cottage; Rich Man, Poor Man
- Spouse: John Swope (m. 1943; died 1979)
- Children: 2, including Topo Swope

Dorothy Hackett McGuire (June 14, 1916 – September 13, 2001) was an American actress. She was nominated for the Academy Award for Best Actress for Gentleman's Agreement (1947) and won the National Board of Review Award for Best Actress for Friendly Persuasion (1956). She starred as the mother in the popular films Old Yeller (1957) and Swiss Family Robinson (1960).

== Life and career ==
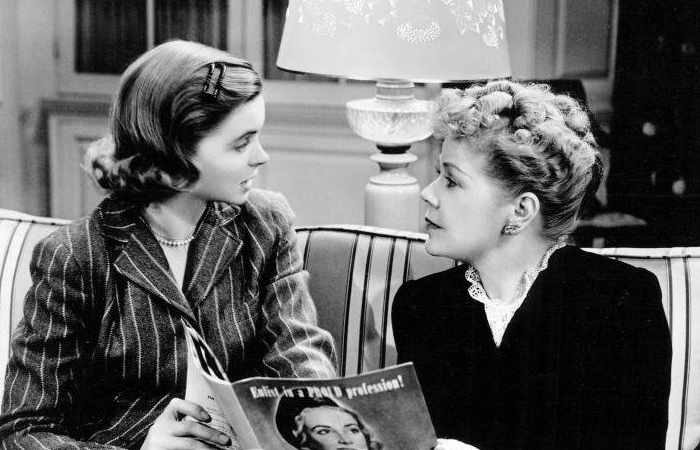
Dorothy McGuire and Spring Byington in the short film Reward Unlimited (1944)

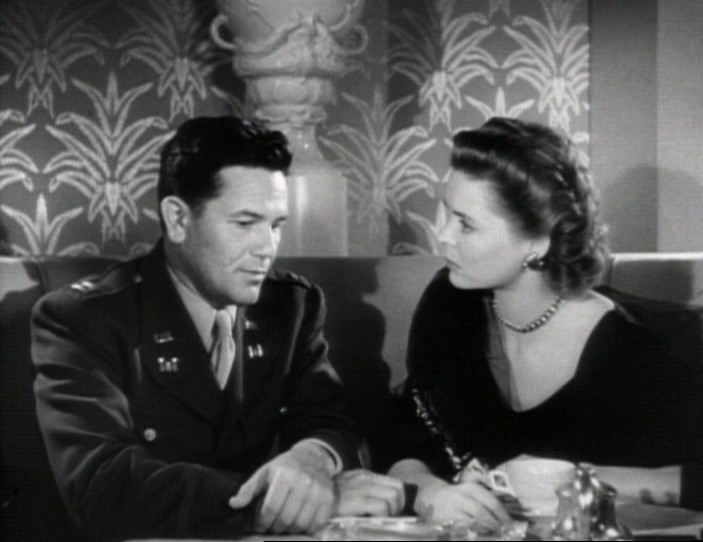
John Garfield and Dorothy McGuire in Gentleman's Agreement (1947)

=== Early years ===
McGuire was born in Omaha, Nebraska, the only child of Isabelle Flaherty McGuire and Thomas Johnson McGuire. She made her stage debut at age 13 at the local community playhouse in Barrie's A Kiss for Cinderella. Her co-star was Henry Fonda, who was also born in Nebraska and was making a return visit to his home town after becoming a success on Broadway.

After her father's death, McGuire attended a convent school in Indianapolis, Indiana. She later attended Pine Manor Junior College in Chestnut Hill, Massachusetts, serving as president of that school's drama club. She graduated from Pine Manor when she was 19.

=== Theatre and modeling ===
McGuire was one of the most sought after models under Walter Thornton's management. She appeared in summer stock at Deertrees, Maine, in 1937 before going to New York.

McGuire acted on radio, playing Sue in the serial Big Sister (1937) and took part in an experimental television broadcast, The Mysterious Mummy Case (1938). She was hired by producer Jed Harris to understudy the ingenue in a Broadway play, Stop Over (1938), which ran only 23 performances. McGuire was an understudy to Martha Scott in Our Town in 1938, eventually taking over Scott's role.

McGuire toured in My Dear Children opposite John Barrymore, and in 1939, was in a revue with Benny Goodman, Swingin' the Dream. She had a role in the short-lived Medicine Show (1940), and a part in the longer-running revival of Kind Lady (1940).

McGuire gained attention on Broadway when cast in the title role of the domestic comedy Claudia. It ran for 722 performances from 1941 to 1943. Brooks Atkinson wrote: "She gives a splendid performance of a part that would be irritating if it were played by a dull actress. She is personally genuine; the charm she radiates across the play is not merely theatrical mannerism."

=== Film ===
Brought to Hollywood by producer David O. Selznick (who called her "a born actress") on the strength of her stage performance, McGuire starred in her first film, Claudia (1943), a movie adaptation of her Broadway success. She portrayed a child bride who almost destroys her marriage through her selfishness. Selznick developed the project, which co-starred Robert Young, then sold it to 20th Century Fox; under this deal, Selznick would share McGuire's contract with Fox.

RKO reunited McGuire with Young in The Enchanted Cottage (1945), which was a box-office success.

At age 28, she played the mother in A Tree Grows in Brooklyn (1945), replacing Gene Tierney, who had become pregnant. Under the direction of Elia Kazan at 20th Century Fox, the film was a big success. So, too, was The Spiral Staircase (1946) in which McGuire played the lead role, a mute. It was originally prepared by Selznick, who envisioned Ingrid Bergman in the lead; Selznick sold the project to RKO along with the services for his producer Dore Schary.

McGuire and Young made a third film together, Claudia and David (1946), a sequel to Claudia, which was less well received. Schary and RKO put her in Till the End of Time (also 1946), a hit with audiences. She later said: "I fought the hardest for this role and it was my least successful. I went right back to playing nice girls and faithful wives. "

She was offered the lead in Anna and the King of Siam (1946), but turned it down to go travelling with her family.

McGuire was nominated for the Academy Award for Best Actress for Gentleman's Agreement (1947) directed by Kazan for Fox. The film was a surprise hit.

Following this film, McGuire, co-star Gregory Peck, and some other actors helped form the La Jolla Playhouse. She appeared in productions of The Importance of Being Earnest, I Am a Camera, The Winslow Boy, and Tonight at 8:30, then went to live in Italy for a year.

Selznick announced a variety of films to star McGuire that were not made, including Dark Medallion, A Doll's House Wings of the Dove and Sands of Time.

=== Radio ===
McGuire was a member of the cast of Big Sister (playing Sue Evans), and Joyce Jordan, M.D. She also appeared in This Is My Best (Miracle in the Rain), Screen Directors Playhouse (The Spiral Staircase) and in Theatre Guild on the Air (Hamlet A Doll's House, Our Town).

=== Later films ===
McGuire spent some time away from screens before returning in two movies for Fox, Mother Didn't Tell Me (1950) and Mister 880 (1950). Neither was particularly popular.

She made her TV debut in Robert Montgomery Presents, an adaptation of Dark Victory, with McGuire playing the Bette Davis role. Schary had become head of production at MGM, where McGuire appeared in Callaway Went Thataway (1951), which lost money. She did I Want You (1951) for Sam Goldwyn, then returned to Broadway for Legend of Lovers (1951–52), but it only had a short run.

McGuire made Invitation (1952) at MGM, which flopped, and Make Haste to Live (1954) at Republic. She had a huge hit with Three Coins in the Fountain (1954) at Fox, and appeared in episodes of The United States Steel Hour, Lux Video Theatre, The Best of Broadway (an adaptation of The Philadelphia Story, as Tracey Lord), and Climax!.

At MGM, she was in Trial (1955), playing Glenn Ford's love interest. The movie was a hit.

=== Mother roles ===
McGuire was cast as Gary Cooper's wife in Friendly Persuasion (1956), directed by William Wyler. The success of this performance led to her being cast in a series of "mother" roles, continuing with Old Yeller (1957) at Disney.

McGuire returned to Broadway in Winesburg, Ohio (1958), which had a short run, then she played a wife and mother in The Remarkable Mr. Pennypacker (1959) at Fox.

She played the matriarch in some melodramas: This Earth Is Mine (1959) with Jean Simmons at Universal; A Summer Place (1959) for Delmer Daves with Richard Egan, Sandra Dee and Troy Donahue at Warner Bros., a big success; and The Dark at the Top of the Stairs (1960).

She returned to Disney with Swiss Family Robinson (1960), one of the most popular films of the year. She made a second film with Daves and Donahue, Susan Slade (1961), playing a mother who passed off her daughter's illegitimate child as her own. She was a mother in Disney's Summer Magic (1963).

McGuire played the Virgin Mary in The Greatest Story Ever Told (1965). She was off screen for a number of years before returning in a British family film, Flight of the Doves (1971).

=== Television ===
McGuire appeared in some TV movies, She Waits (1972) and a PBS adaptation of Another Part of the Forest (1972). She provided voice work for Jonathan Livingston Seagull (1973), and made one final appearance on Broadway in a revival of The Night of the Iguana (1976–77) alongside Richard Chamberlain.

Most of McGuire's later career work was for the small screen: The Runaways (1975), Rich Man, Poor Man (1976), the pilot for Little Women (1976), The Incredible Journey of Doctor Meg Laurel (1979), Ghost Dancing (1983), Amos (1985), Between the Darkness and the Dawn (1985), American Geisha (1986), Caroline? (1990), and The Last Best Year (1990).

She was also in episodes of Fantasy Island, Hotel, The Love Boat, Glitter, St. Elsewhere, and Highway to Heaven. She provided the narration for Summer Heat (1987), and toured in 1987 in I Never Sang for My Father. In 1984–85, McGuire played Cora Miller on the long-running CBS soap opera The Young and the Restless. Cora was the estranged mother of tycoon Victor Newman, played by Eric Braeden

In 1982, she said, "I love my career, but I never felt much about it – about how to nurture it...It's been very erratic, after all ... To this day, I don't know what shapes a Hollywood career ... I was never a classic beauty. I had no image, so I found myself in a lot of things accidentally."

McGuire retired from acting after suffering a hip injury in the early 1990s.

== Personal life and death ==
McGuire was married to Life magazine photographer John Swope for more than 35 years, with whom she had a son, photographer Mark Swope (1953–2016), and a daughter, actress Topo Swope (b. 1949).

McGuire died in Santa Monica, California, on September 13, 2001, at the age of 85; she developed arrhythmia weeks after sustaining a broken leg.

== Recognition ==
For her contribution to the motion-picture industry, Dorothy McGuire has a star on the Hollywood Walk of Fame at 6933 Hollywood Boulevard. It was dedicated February 8, 1960.

== Filmography ==
Year	Title	Role	Notes
1943	Claudia	Claudia Naughton	
1944	Reward Unlimited	Peggy Adams	Short film for the U.S. Cadet Nurse Corps
1945	The Enchanted Cottage	Laura Pennington	
1945	A Tree Grows in Brooklyn	Katie Nolan	
1946	The Spiral Staircase	Helen Capel	
1946	Claudia and David	Claudia Naughton	
1946	Till the End of Time	Pat Ruscomb	
1947	Gentleman's Agreement	Kathy Lacy	Nominated–Academy Award for Best Actress; Nominated–New York Film Critics Circle Award for Best Actress
1950	Mother Didn't Tell Me	Jane Morgan	
1950	Mister 880	Ann Winslow	
1951	Callaway Went Thataway	Deborah Patterson	
1951	I Want You	Nancy Greer	
1952	Invitation	Ellen Bowker Pierce	
1954	Make Haste to Live	Crystal Benson	
1954	Three Coins in the Fountain	Miss Frances	
1955	Trial	Abbe Nyle	
1956	Friendly Persuasion	Eliza Birdwell	National Board of Review Award for Best Actress
1957	Old Yeller	Katie Coates	
1959	The Remarkable Mr. Pennypacker	Mrs. Emily 'Ma' Pennypacker	
1959	This Earth Is Mine	Martha Fairon	
1959	A Summer Place	Sylvia Hunter	
1960	The Dark at the Top of the Stairs	Cora Flood	
1960	Swiss Family Robinson	Mother Robinson	
1961	Susan Slade	Leah Slade	
1963	Summer Magic	Margaret Carey	
1965	The Greatest Story Ever Told	The Virgin Mary	
1971	Flight of the Doves	Granny O'Flaherty	
1972	She Waits	Sarah Wilson	TV movie
1972	Another Part of the Forest	Lavinia Hubbard	TV movie
1973	Jonathan Livingston Seagull	Mother	Voice
1975	The Runaways	Angela Lakey	TV movie
1978	Little Women	Marmee March	7 episodes
1979	The Incredible Journey of Doctor Meg Laurel	Effie Webb	TV movie
1983	Ghost Dancing	Sarah Bowman	TV movie
1985	Amos	Hester Farrell	TV movie Nominated–Primetime Emmy Award for Outstanding Supporting Actress in a Miniseries or a Special
1985	Between the Darkness and the Dawn	Beryl Foster	TV movie
1986	American Geisha	Ann Suzuki	TV movie
1987	Summer Heat	Narrator	Voice
1990	Caroline?	Flora Atkins	Hallmark Hall of Fame TV movie
1990	The Last Best Year	Anne	TV movie (final film role)

== Complete TV credits ==
Year	Title	Role	Episode
1951	Robert Montgomery Presents	Judith Traherne	"Dark Victory"
1954	The United States Steel Hour	Tina	"A Garden in the Sea"
1954	Lux Video Theatre	Jody Norris	"To Each His Own"
1954	The Best of Broadway	Tracy Lord	"The Philadelphia Story"
1954	Climax!	Janet Spence	"The Gioconda Smile"; Nominated–Primetime Emmy Award for Best Actress in a Single Performance
1954	What's My Line	Herself (Celebrity Mystery Guest)	
1956	Climax!	Miranda	"Pale Horse, Pale Rider"
1964	The Red Skelton Hour	Guest Vocalist	"A Man and His Money Are Soon Parted"
1976	Rich Man, Poor Man	Mary Jordache	7 episodes Nominated–Primetime Emmy Award for Outstanding Continuing Performance by a Supporting Actress in a Drama Series
1982	The Love Boat	Hanna Hamilton	"Thanksgiving Cruise: The Best of Friends/Too Many Dads/Love Will Find a Way" S6 E7
1983	Fantasy Island	Joan Mallory	"Three's a Crowd/Second Time Around"
1984	The Love Boat	Sarah Webster	"Aerobic April/The Wager/Story of the Century"
1984	The Young and the Restless	Cora Miller	
1985	Hotel	Mrs. Christopher	"Skeletons"
1985	Glitter	The Matriarch	"The Matriarch"
1986	St. Elsewhere	Augusta Endicott	3 episodes
1986	Highway to Heaven	Jane Thompson	"Keep Smiling"
1988	Highway to Heaven	Jane Thompson	"We Have Forever: Part 1" "We Have Forever: Part 2"
1988	American Playhouse	Margaret Garrison	"I Never Sang for My Father"

== Radio appearances ==
Year	Program	Episode/source
1945	Lux Radio Theatre	I'll Be Seeing You
1947	Radio Reader's Digest	Sweet Rosie O'Grady
1951	Theatre Guild on the Air	Hamlet
1953	Lux Summer Theatre	The Fall of Maggie Phillips
