= Gilbert v. State =

Criminal case from the Florida District Court of Appeals

- Court: Florida District Court of Appeals
- Full case name: Roswell Gilbert, Appellant, v. State of Florida, Appellee.
- Decided: April 30, 1986
- Citation: 487 So. 2d. 1185; 11 Fla. L. Weekly 1007

Case history
- Appealed from: Broward County Circuit Court

Court membership
- Judges sitting: James H. Walden, Hugh S. Glickstein, William C. Owen Jr.

Case opinions
- Decision by: Walden
- Concurrence: Owen, Glickstein

Keywords
- Euthanasia; Mercy killing; Premeditated murder

Gilbert v. State is a criminal case from the Florida District Court of Appeals, decided in 1986. Roswell Gilbert, age 75, was found guilty of first-degree or premeditated murder, of his wife, Emily Gilbert. The District Court affirmed his conviction, holding that euthanasia, or "mercy killing," was not a defense to premeditated murder. Gilbert was sentenced to life imprisonment, and under section 775.082, Florida Statutes (1981), he received a mandatory minimum sentence of 25 years.

The disturbing facts of this case, as well as Gilbert's defense, has made this case a frequent inclusion in Criminal Law casebooks for first-year law courses.

This opinion was written by Judge Walden.

== Factual background ==
Roswell and Emily Gilbert lived together in a Fort Lauderdale condominium and had been married for 51 years. Emily suffered from osteoporosis and Alzheimer's disease. She also took medication for severe arthritis. Those who knew Emily, testified that she was constantly in pain due to her condition. One instance, Roswell was called out of a condominium meeting because his wife was upset and crying. When he arrived, Emily said, "I'm so sick, I want to die, I'm so sick...Ros I want to die, I want to die."

On cross-examination, Roswell described the events that led up to Emily's death. On March 2, Emily was experiencing problems with her osteoporosis and was taken to the hospital the next day. She stated that she did not want to stay there and insisted on going home, which she eventually did. On March 4, the day of the killing, Roswell took Emily out to lunch. When they returned, Roswell gave Emily her medication, and laid her on the couch while he left for his condominium meeting. A few minutes later, Emily followed him down to the meeting, where Roswell left, and took her back up to their apartment. As she laid back down on the sofa, she said, "Please, somebody help me. Please, somebody help me." In his own words, this is how Roswell killed Emily:

Who's that somebody but me, you know, and there she was in pain and all this confusion and I guess if I got cold as icewater that's what had happened. I thought to myself, I've got to do it, it's got to be mine, I've got to end her suffering, this can't go on.

I went in. The gun was up on the top shelf with a clip in it. I loaded it with one shell, pulled the clip out. Well, then I shot her in the head. I felt her pulse, I could still feel it. I though, Oh, my God, I loused it up. I went back to the shop. This time I was shaking. I wasn't cold as ice at all. Back to the shop, put another round in the gun, came back, put another bullet in her head.

The only comforting thing, the first shot there was no convulsive reaction, just her right hand shook like that fast and her head went over the impacted bullet and it slowly came down, didn't make any noise except her mouth just opened slowly like that and then, you know, I thought it hit so fast she didn't know what happened. Then I felt her pulse. It turned out I was wrong. The pulse keeps going after this episode for a few minutes anyway. I didn't know that. I just though I had, you know--and the second time I fired I felt the pulse seemed to be gone. So I somehow got to the telephone and called the security guard downstairs and I said, "I just killed my wife."

The whole thing was a mess and the only solution to me was to terminate her suffering. That's all. I didn't consider what would happen to me. The only important thing was to end her suffering. I could take care of whatever happens to me and it's happening right now and that was of no consequence to me. Sure, I know I was breaking the law but there seems to be things more important than the law, at least to me in my private tragedy. So it's murder. So what?

Roswell believed that using a gun was the most merciful way of killing his wife, and further testified that he had never talked with Emily about killing her. He also stated that he shot her from behind so that she would not see the gun. Doctors testified that Emily could have lived for another five to ten years.

== Opinion of the court ==
The court held that euthanasia, or "mercy killing," is not a defense to first-degree or premeditated murder. The court acknowledged the fact that Roswell had been a peaceful and law-abiding citizen up until this offense. But, the statutory mandatory minimum sentences do not take these issues into account. The court held that whether such issues should be considered, to where distinctions would be made in sentencing between different kinds of wrongdoers, is a matter for the legislature.

Judge Glickstein concurred with the majority, but expressed some concern about the suggestion in varied sentences according to the kind of wrongdoer. There should be no distinctions because the victims are dead either way. He argues that if the act was deliberate, there should be no change in the length of the minimum sentence. Roswell Gilbert served five years in prison before being granted clemency in 1990 by Florida Governor Bob Martinez. He died in September 1994 and his New York Times obituary reported him as saying he came to regret killing his wife. Gilbert was played by actor Robert Young in the 1987 television movie Mercy Or Murder.

== Legal significance ==
A crucial element to first-degree murder is premeditation. This case illustrates how good intentions do not negate the premeditation requirement.
