= Claudia and David =

1946 film by Walter Lang

- Directed by: Walter Lang
- Written by: Frank Davis; Tess Slesinger
- Screenplay by: Rose Franken; William Brown Meloney; Vera Caspary (adaptation)
- Based on: Claudia and David; 1940 novel by Rose Franken
- Produced by: William Perlberg
- Starring: Dorothy McGuire; Robert Young; Mary Astor
- Cinematography: Joseph LaShelle
- Edited by: Robert L. Simpson
- Music by: Cyril J. Mockridge; David Buttolph
- Color process: Black and white
- Production company: 20th Century Fox
- Distributed by: 20th Century Fox
- Release date: February 25, 1946
- Running time: 78 minutes
- Country: United States
- Language: English
- Box office: $1,650,000

Claudia and David is a 1946 American comedy drama film directed by Walter Lang and starring.s Dorothy McGuire, Robert Young and Mary Astor. Dorothy McGuire and Robert Young repeat their roles from the film Claudia (1943). Like its predecessor, Claudia and David was based on a series of short stories by Rose Franken, which also inspired a successful stage play and radio series.

== Plot ==
Claudia (Dorothy McGuire), still charmingly naive and a bit nervous, is struggling with the responsibilities of marriage and parenthood in their rural Connecticut town. Jealousy creeps into the relationship when Elizabeth (Mary Astor) starts consulting David on a building project, while Claudia is attracting the uninvited attentions of Phil (John Sutton), who happens to be married.

== Cast ==
- Dorothy McGuire as Claudia Naughton
- Robert Young as David Naughton
- Mary Astor as Elizabeth Van Doren
- John Sutton as Phil Dexter
- Gail Patrick as Julia Naughton
- Rose Hobart as Edith Dexter
- Harry Davenport as Dr. Harry
- Florence Bates as Nancy Riddle
- Jerome Cowan as Brian O'Toole
- Frank Tweddell as Fritz
- Elsa Janssen as Bertha
- Anthony Sydes as Bobby
- Eva Novak as Maid
