= Warnecke =

Surname list

Warnecke is a surname of North German origin, from the name Warner (Low German form of Werner) combined with the suffix -ke in a pet form. Variants of the name include Warnke and Wernicke.

== People with the surname ==
- Berthold Warnecke (born 1971), German dramaturge
- Harry Warnecke (1900–1984), American photographer
- Frederick J. Warnecke (1906–1977), American bishop
- Fritz Warnecke (1898–1968), German general
- Gary Warnecke (born 1957), Australian rugby player
- George Warnecke (1894–1981), Australian journalist
- Gordon Warnecke (born 1962), British actor
- John Carl Warnecke (1919–2010), American architect
- Mark Warnecke (born 1970), German swimmer
- Robert R. Warnecke, French electrical engineer
- Rudolf Warnecke (1905–1994), German artist
- William Warnecke (c.1879–1939), American photographer
