= William Brown Meloney =

William Brown Meloney may refer to:

- William Brown Meloney (1878–1925), journalist, writer, executive secretary to the New York mayor and historian of shipping
- Marie Mattingly Meloney (1878–1943), journalist and socialite, who used Mrs. William B. Meloney as her professional and social name
- William Brown Meloney (1902–1971), journalist, novelist, short-story writer and theatrical producer
