= Warnke =

Origin
- Language: German
- Meaning: descendant of little Waro (protection)

Other names
- Variant forms: Werner, Warner, Wernere, Waerner, Warnken, Warnecke

Warnke is a surname. The word is of German origin. It means the descendant of little Waro (protection). The variants of the word include Werner, Warner, Wernere, Waerner and Warnken. The earliest record of the surname was found in Lower Saxony.

Notable people with the surname include:

== Persons with the surname ==
- Allan Warnke (1946–2021), Canadian politician
- Christine Warnke, American politician
- Curtis B. Warnke (1932–2006), American newspaper editor and politician
- David Warnke (born 1960), American professional football player
- Don Warnke (1920–1970), American professional basketball player
- Edmundo Warnke (born 1951), Chilean athlete
- Frank Warnke (1933–2011), American politician
- Georgia Warnke, American philosopher
- Jan-Peter Warnke (born 1959), German neurosurgeon and politician
- Herbert Warnke (1902–1975), East German trade unionist and politician
- Jürgen Warnke (1932–2013), German politician
- Martin Warnke (1937–2019), German art historian
- Mike Warnke (born 1946), American Christian evangelist and comedian
- Paul Warnke (1920–2001), American diplomat

== See also ==
- Warnke (disambiguation)
