= The Secret Heart =

1946 film by Robert Zigler Leonard

- Theatrical release poster
- Directed by: Robert Z. Leonard
- Screenplay by: Whitfield Cook; Anne Morrison Chapin
- Story by: Rose Franken; William Brown Meloney
- Produced by: Edwin H. Knopf
- Starring: Claudette Colbert; Walter Pidgeon; June Allyson
- Cinematography: George J. Folsey
- Edited by: Adrienne Fazan
- Music by: Bronislau Kaper
- Production company: Metro-Goldwyn-Mayer
- Distributed by: Loew's Inc.
- Release date: December 25, 1946
- Running time: 97 minutes
- Country: United States
- Language: English
- Budget: $1,735,000
- Box office: $2,657,000

The Secret Heart is a 1946 American drama film directed by Robert Z. Leonard and starring Claudette Colbert, Walter Pidgeon and June Allyson.

== Plot ==
Lee (Claudette Colbert) is engaged to marry Larry Addams (Richard Derr), a spendthrift widower with two children, son Chase (Robert Sterling) and daughter Penny (June Allyson). Lee had been living in England with her guardian aunt, who didn't approve of the match since Larry was an alcoholic, and while returning to America on an ocean liner, she meets Chris Matthews (Walter Pidgeon), a close friend of Larry's. Despite her loving feelings for Chris, she marries Larry, and moves to his farm in Rhode Island. Larry's talent is playing the piano, which he teaches Penny, but he gave up this ambition to work in a bank, to please his father. This frustrated ambition has ruined his life, and over the next two years Lee tries to confront his alcoholism, while trying to win Penny's confidence. While Lee is out for the night with Chris, Larry dies, his body found at the bottom of a cliff. He had committed suicide after two years of marriage, and on his death, it is reported that Larry had embezzled money from his clients. Lee sends Chris away and moves the family away from the farm, to New York where she takes a job to pay off Larry's debts, and withholds the truth from Penny, wanting to shield her from the stigma of scandal. Penny makes a hero out of Larry, who she believes died of a heart attack, and is unable to embrace Lee, who is now left to look after them alone.

Ten years later, Penny, who behaves strangely, has dropped out of school and plays the piano incessantly for her father's memory when nobody else is around, is the patient of psychiatrist Dr. Rossiger. Lee goes to see him, concerned about Penny's behaviour, and the story up to this point is recalled in flashback. The doctor advises that they move back to the farm for the summer, since that is where the death occurred, and he believes that confronting the past will help cure Penny. Chase returns from the navy after three years and seeks a job with Chris, who now owns a shipyard. He introduces Penny to his navy friend Brandon Reynolds. They all move to the farm, together with Chase's friend Kay Burns, where Chris reenters Lee's life after a ten-year absence, and Lee realizes that it was Chris she loved all along and let get away. Once at the farm, Penny becomes disenchanted with her father's memory when Chase tells her the truth, and becomes despondent, feeling that Chris is the only person she can confide in. Although Brandon is interested in Penny, she loves Chris, and is devastated when she finds him in Lee's arms. Penny then tries to kill herself by jumping off a cliff, as Larry had done, but Lee intervenes in time to prevent it. The healing process begins and when Lee tells Penny the complete story of her father's life, Penny is finally able to embrace Lee. At the end Penny graduates, having adopted Chris as her father, and resumes her romance with Brandon.

== Cast ==
- Claudette Colbert as Leola 'Lee' Addams
- Walter Pidgeon as Chris Matthews
- June Allyson as Penny Addams
- Lionel Barrymore as Dr. Rossiger
- Robert Sterling as Chase N. Addams
- Marshall Thompson as Brandon Reynolds
- Elizabeth Patterson as Mrs. Stover
- Richard Derr as Larry Addams
- Patricia Medina as Kay Burns
- Eily Malyon as Miss Hunter
- Dwayne Hickman as Chase (as a Child)

== Reception ==
The film earned $2,591,000 in the US and Canada and $1,309,000 elsewhere, resulting in a profit of $891,000.
