= Beloved Enemy =

1936 film

- Directed by: H. C. Potter
- Written by: John Balderston; Rose Franken; William Brown Meloney
- Produced by: Samuel Goldwyn; George Haight
- Starring: Merle Oberon; Brian Aherne; David Niven
- Cinematography: Gregg Toland
- Edited by: Sherman Todd
- Music by: Alfred Newman
- Production company: Samuel Goldwyn Productions
- Distributed by: United Artists
- Release date: December 25, 1936
- Running time: 90 minutes
- Country: United States
- Language: English

Beloved Enemy is a 1936 American drama film directed by H.C. Potter and starring Merle Oberon, Brian Aherne, and David Niven. It was loosely based on the life of Michael Collins.

== Plot ==
During the Irish War of Independence in 1921, Irish rebel leader Dennis Riordan (Aherne) and English aristocrat Helen Drummond (Oberon) meet and fall in love. Riordan is pursued, however, by British army officer Captain Preston (Niven).

The original film ended with Riordan getting shot and killed, but did not do well at the box office. A happier ending was also filmed which has Riordan being shot but surviving; all subsequent versions have. The original cut has since been lost.

The movie has several comic relief scenes: after a raid on an IRA "safe house", British officers grumble about being not being able to find Riordan, who is in fact standing just behind them; when the Irish Delegation goes to a formal ball and is asked by the footman for their names to be announced, the delegation replies in Irish.

== Cast ==
- Merle Oberon as Helen Drummond
- Brian Aherne as Dennis Riordan
- Karen Morley as Cathleen O'Brien
- Henry Stephenson as Lord Athleigh
- David Niven as Capt. Gerald Preston
- Jerome Cowan as Tim O'Rourke
- Donald Crisp as Liam Burke
- Ronald Sinclair as Jerry O'Brien
- Granville Bates as Ryan
- P.J. Kelly as Rooney
- Leo McCabe as Connor
- Pat O'Malley as Patrick Callahan
- Jack Mulhall as Casey
- Claude King as Colonel Loder
- Wyndham Standing as Thornton
- Robert Strange as Perrins
- Lionel Pape as Crump
- John Burton as Hall
- Leyland Hodgson as Hawkins
- Frank Roan as Murphy
- Wally Maher as Humphries
- Theodore von Eltz as Sean O'Brien
- David Torrence as Alroyd
- Denis O'Dea as Sean

== Reception ==
Frank S. Nugent of the The New York Times described the film as "a fine and mature and dignified drama" with "the stamp of quality on each of its departments—story, direction, performance and production—and it tempts us mightily to revise our tentative list of this year's best ten to make a fitting place for it."

Variety's review focussed mainly on the two lead performers, and wrote, "Merle Oberon and Brian Aherne are surprisingly well suited to each other, and the romantic episodes, although somewhat overlength, are charmingly played. Oberon is lovely to look upon and speaks her lines with fine enunciation. Aherne plays the young Irish rebel with humorous ease. The strain on credulity is the implication that the armistice between the warring factions was brought about by the English girl because of her love for the Irish chief."

In their March, 1937 edition, Modern Screen gave the film a three-star review and described it as "both beautifully romantic and stirringly dramatic." Praise was given for the level of acting, saying that Brian Aherne and Merle Oberon delivered "top-notch performances, giving credence to a story which might have fallen apart in less capable hands" and that Henry Stephenson, Jerome Cowan, Karen Morley, Donald Crisp and David Niven were "outstanding." It concluded with the comment "considerable credit must be given to Henry C. Potter for his intelligent handling of the tragic theme."

== Bibliography ==
- Marill, Alvin H. Samuel Goldwyn Presents. A. S. Barnes, 1976.
