= Wade Mountfortt Jr. =

American photojournalist (c.1886–1929)

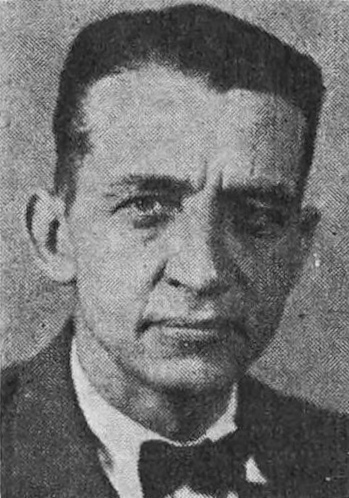
- Mountfortt in 1925
- Born: c. 1886
- Died: April 23, 1929 (aged 43); Denver, Colorado, US
- Occupation: Photojournalist
- Employer(s): The Denver Post; The New York Times
- Organization: American Press Association
- Military career
- Allegiance: United States
- Unit: American Expeditionary Forces
- Conflicts: World War I

Wade C. Mountfortt Jr. (sometimes erroneously named Mountford; c. 1886 – April 23, 1929) was an American photojournalist who worked for The Denver Post and The New York Times.

== Biography ==
Born c. 1886, his father Wade Sr. was also a photojournalist, employed by the New York World. During World War I, he served in the American Expeditionary Forces, during which he was attacked with mustard gas. He was married.

As a photojournalist, he was employed by The New York Times, the New York World and The Denver Post; he worked at The Denver Post at the time of his death. He and photojournalist William Warnecke notably photographed the assassination attempt on New York City mayor William Jay Gaynor in 1910. A member of the American Press Association, he photographed the Triangle Shirtwaist Factory fire in 1911, which ran on the second page of The New York Times, while he was employed by them. He was also respected by president Theodore Roosevelt and travelled with him at times.

Mountfortt died on April 23, 1929, aged 43, of a vehicle rollover on a mountain road, in Denver. Ray Black, a Denver Post editor and the other occupant in the car, survived the crash uninjured.
