= Warnke (disambiguation) =

Warnke is a German surname. It may also refer to:

- Warnke Covered Bridge, historic bridge in Ohio, United States
- Bernie Warnke Propellers, American manufacturer
- Willam–Warnke yield criterion, function in solid mechanics
