= Marie Mattingly Meloney =

American journalist (1878–1943)

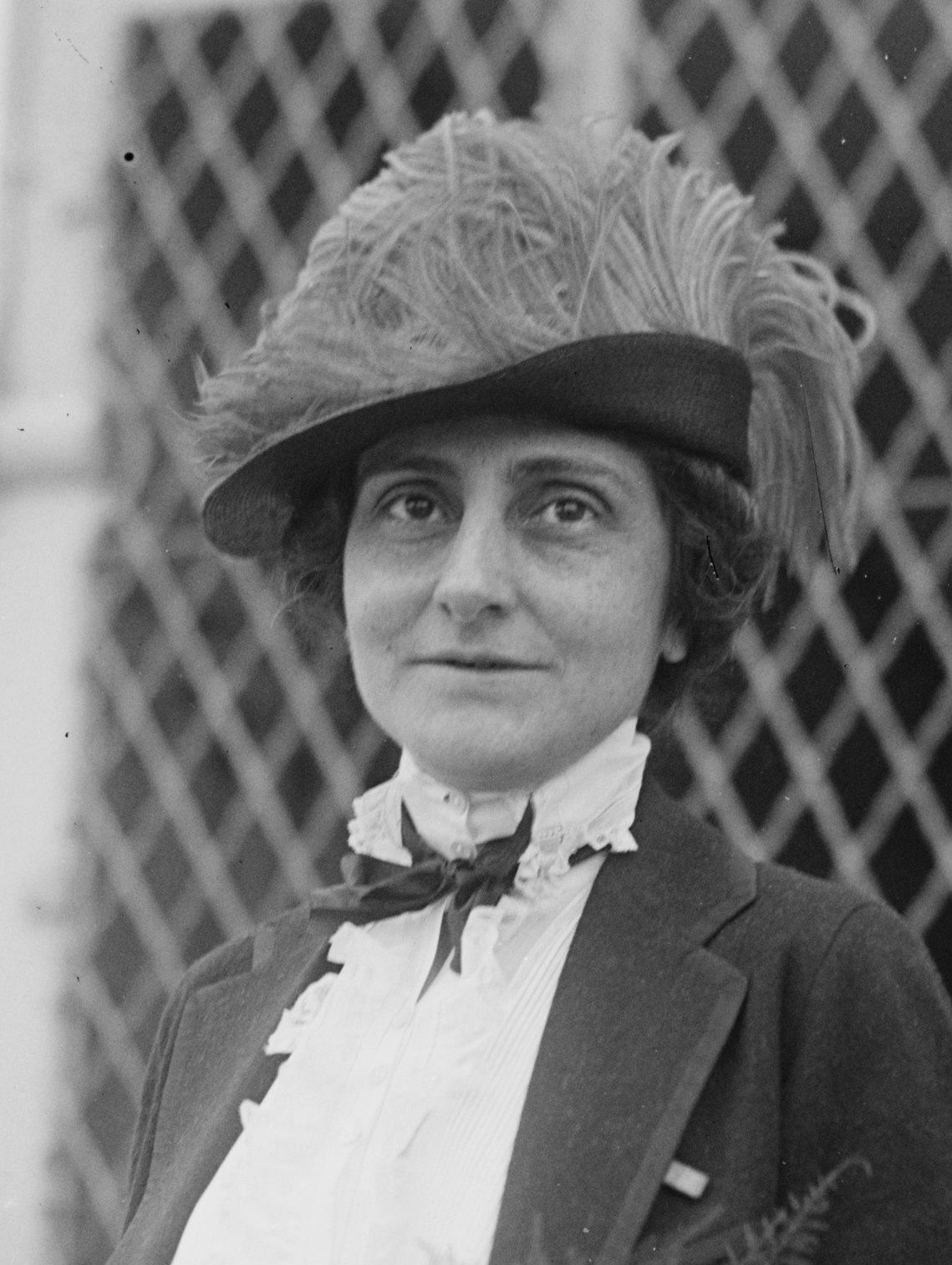
- Marie Mattingly Meloney c. 1921
- Born: Marie Mattingly; December 8, 1878
- Died: June 23, 1943 (aged 64)

Marie Mattingly Meloney (December 8, 1878 – June 23, 1943), who used Mrs. William B. Meloney as her professional and social name, was "one of the leading woman journalists of the United States", a magazine editor and a socialite who in the 1920s organized a fund drive to buy radium for Marie Curie and began a movement for better housing. In the 1930s, nicknamed Missy, she was a friend and confidante of Eleanor Roosevelt.

== Biography ==
=== Personal life ===
Marie Mattingly was born on December 8, 1878, in Bardstown, Kentucky, the daughter of Cyprian Peter Mattingly, a physician, and his third wife, the former Sarah Irwin (1852–1934), an educationist and journalist who was the founding editor of The Kentucky Magazine, "one of the first publications of literature and science to be edited by a woman". Sarah Irwin Mattingly joined the faculty of the Washington College for Girls in 1891, and later became the school's president, serving until the school closed in 1896. Marie Mattingly had an elder brother, Judge Carroll Mattingly, who died "several years" before 1934 "from injuries received in a football game in his student days at Georgetown University".

Marie was educated privately at home and was trained as a concert pianist, but a horseback accident put an end to that endeavor and she turned to journalism. She once declared: "I have been lame since 15, and had a bad lung since 17 and have done the work of three men ever since".

In 1920, at the age of 42, she was described as "small, very frail, almost an invalid; a childhood accident had made her slightly lame. She had grey hair and immense, poetic black eyes set in a lovely pale face".

In 1904, she married William Brown Meloney IV, an editor on The New York Sun and later executive secretary to Mayor William Jay Gaynor of New York City. They had one child, William Brown Meloney V, who became a writer and Broadway producer.

The elder Meloney, who had been gassed in World War I and had the rank of major, died at age 47 on December 7, 1925, at the family country home in Pawling, New York.

After a month-long bout of influenza, Marie Meloney died June 23, 1943, in the same house on South Quaker Hill in Pawling. The month of her death Time magazine described her as "fine lace made of cable wire". After a procession from the residence of her son at 7 Washington Square North, New York City, a requiem mass was recited for her on June 25 in St. Patrick's Cathedral, by Monsignor John J. Casey. Former U.S. President Herbert Hoover was an honorary pallbearer, as were Owen D. Young, former head of the General Electric Company; James A. Farley, chairman of the New York State Democratic Committee, and David Sarnoff, president of the Radio Corporation of America. Among the five hundred mourners were Bishop John F. O'Hara, military delegate of the Armed Forces of the United States; Mrs. Hoover, playwright Channing Pollock and novelist Fannie Hurst. Burial followed in Woodlawn Cemetery in The Bronx, New York City.

=== Journalism ===
Mattingly was just fifteen years old when she worked on The Washington Post, and at age sixteen "helped cover a Republican National Convention for the New York World". She was eighteen years old when she became a correspondent for The Denver Post in Washington, D.C. She was "one of the first women accredited to a seat in the Senate press gallery". In November 1899, she scored a journalistic coup when she discovered, quite by chance, the unannounced wedding of Admiral George Dewey.

She then joined the staff of The New York Sun, where she wrote the "Men About Town" column. She also worked for the New York World. She edited Woman's Magazine and was associate editor of Everybody's Magazine.

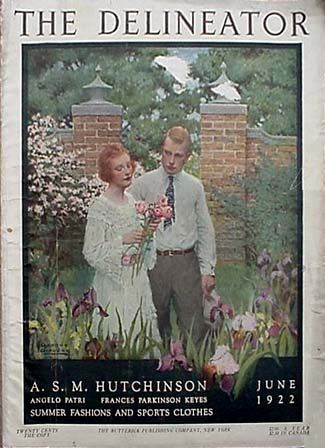
The Delineator, June 1922

By the early 1920s, Meloney, by then married, was editor of The Delineator magazine, a women's publication owned by George W. Wilder. In 1926, the magazine merged with another Butterick Publishing Company publication, The Designer, with Meloney continuing at the helm.

In 1927, Meloney was editor of the Sunday magazine of the New York Herald Tribune. Beginning in 1930, she was the organizer of the annual Herald Tribune Forum on Current Problems, which highlighted noted people as speakers. In 1935, she contributed a chapter to an antiwar book, Why Wars Must Cease, published by the Macmillan Company.

In 1935, she continued with the Herald Tribune as editor of the new This Week magazine, which took the place of the former Sunday supplement and was eventually syndicated across the United States to a total of six million readers. Time magazine noted seven years later that "Meloney, 59, tiny, fragile, grey-haired ... edits the magazine from her suite in the Waldorf-Astoria".

As a journalist, Meloney

traveled widely in search of news and ... interviewed Benito Mussolini four times and once turned down an interview with Adolf Hitler. The German dictator had broken an interview appointment with Mrs. Meloney. When an emissary attempted to arrange another, she sent word to the Fuehrer that she was no longer interested.

Upon her death, the New York Times commented in an editorial:

Mrs. William Brown Meloney, whose deeply regretted death was announced yesterday, was one of the pioneers of the triumph of women in the newspaper field. Toward the end of the last century she was a reporter in Washington at 16. It is even now a charming sight; in those days it must have been a strange sight, this young girl surveying the unkempt proceedings of Congress and the delirium of national conventions. She was a leader as well as a precursor. ... To common sense and judgment she added imagination. Some instinct in her reached out and told her what people wanted.

Summary of her magazine career

- Reporter, Washington Post, 1895
- Washington bureau, Denver Post, 1897–99
- Reporter, New York World, 1900
- Reporter, New York Sun, 1901–04
- Editor, Woman's Magazine, 1914–20
- Associate editor, Everybody's magazine, 1917–20
- Editor, The Delineator, 1920–26 or 1921–26
- Editor, Sunday Magazine of the New York Herald Tribune, 1926–1934
- Editor, This Week magazine, 1934–1943

=== Radium campaign ===
In 1920, as editor of The Delineator, Meloney was granted a rare interview with radium pioneer Marie Curie in her laboratory in Paris. Meloney later wrote about her visit:

The door opened and I saw a pale, timid little woman [Curie] in a black cotton dress, with the saddest face I had ever looked upon. Her kind, patient, beautiful face had the detached expression of a scholar. Suddenly I felt like an intruder. My timidity exceeded her own. I had been a trained interrogator for twenty years, but I could not ask a single question of this gentle woman in a black cotton dress. I tried to explain that American women were interested in her great work, and found myself apologising for intruding upon her precious time.

Dr. Ann M. Lewicki, who called Meloney a "trailblazing woman in a man's world of journalism", wrote in Radiology magazine:

During this first meeting, Mrs. Meloney learned that what Marie wanted most at this point in her life was some additional radium so that she could continue her laboratory research. She who had discovered radium, who had freely shared all information about the extraction process, and who had given radium away so that cancer patients could be treated, found herself without the financial means to acquire the expensive substance. Mrs. Meloney made a promise to Marie . . . to correct this injustice and to obtain for her the 1 g of radium that Marie requested.

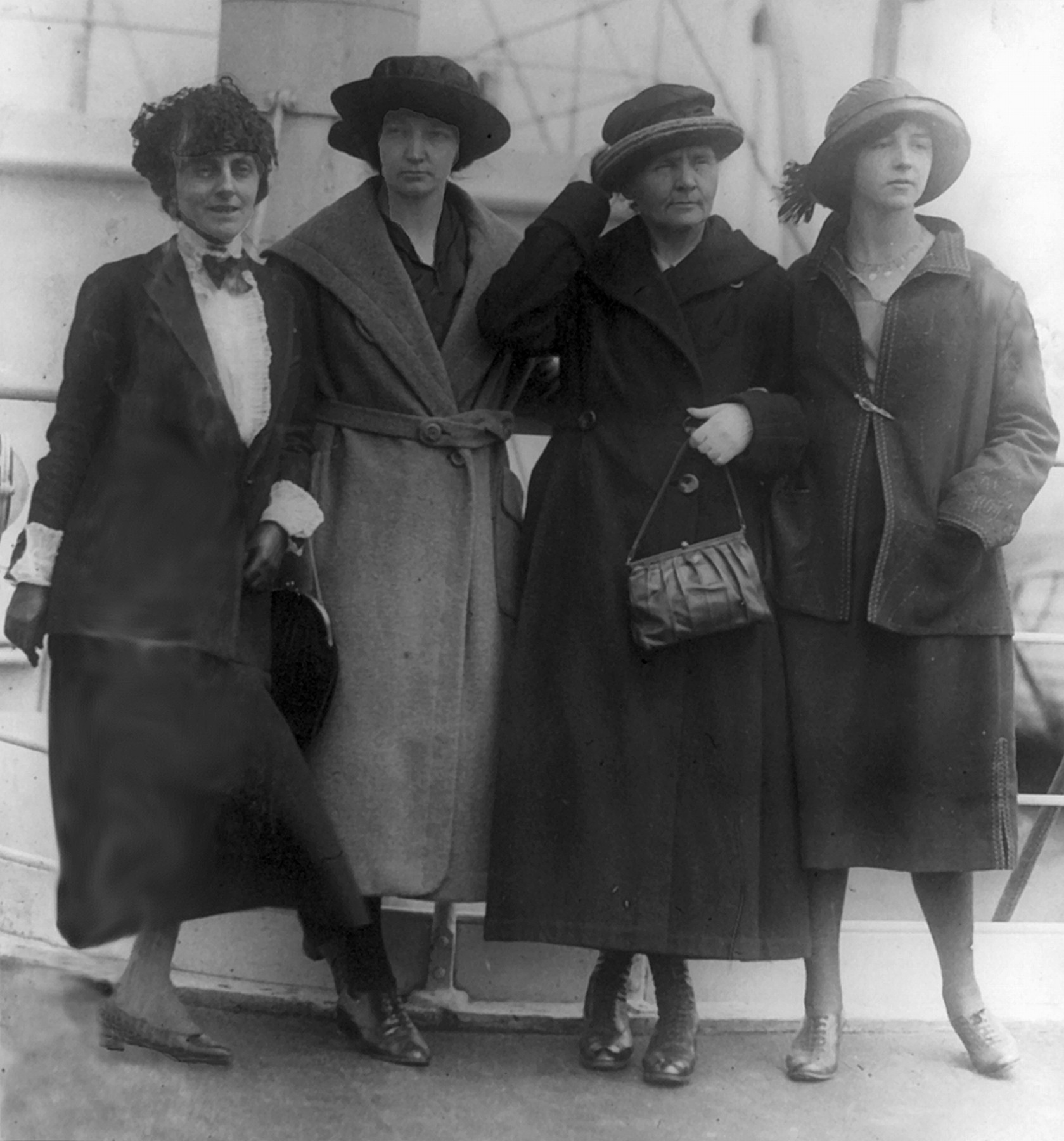
Meloney, left, with Irène, Marie and Ève Curie

The price for one gram of radium in 1920 was $100,000, and Meloney conducted a nationwide campaign that succeeded in raising the money, "primarily by means of small donations and the help of many women throughout the country". Meloney also persuaded the shy Marie Curie "to travel to the United States to receive the gift". But before she would agree, it is said that Meloney "wrested from editors across the country a promise to suppress" any coverage of a reputed affair that Curie had, after the death of her husband, with noted French physicist Paul Langevin. Curie made the trip in spring 1921, accompanied by Charlotte and Vernon Kellogg, and she and her two daughters, Irène and Ève, were met at the New York dock by a retinue of journalists, including twenty-six photographers.

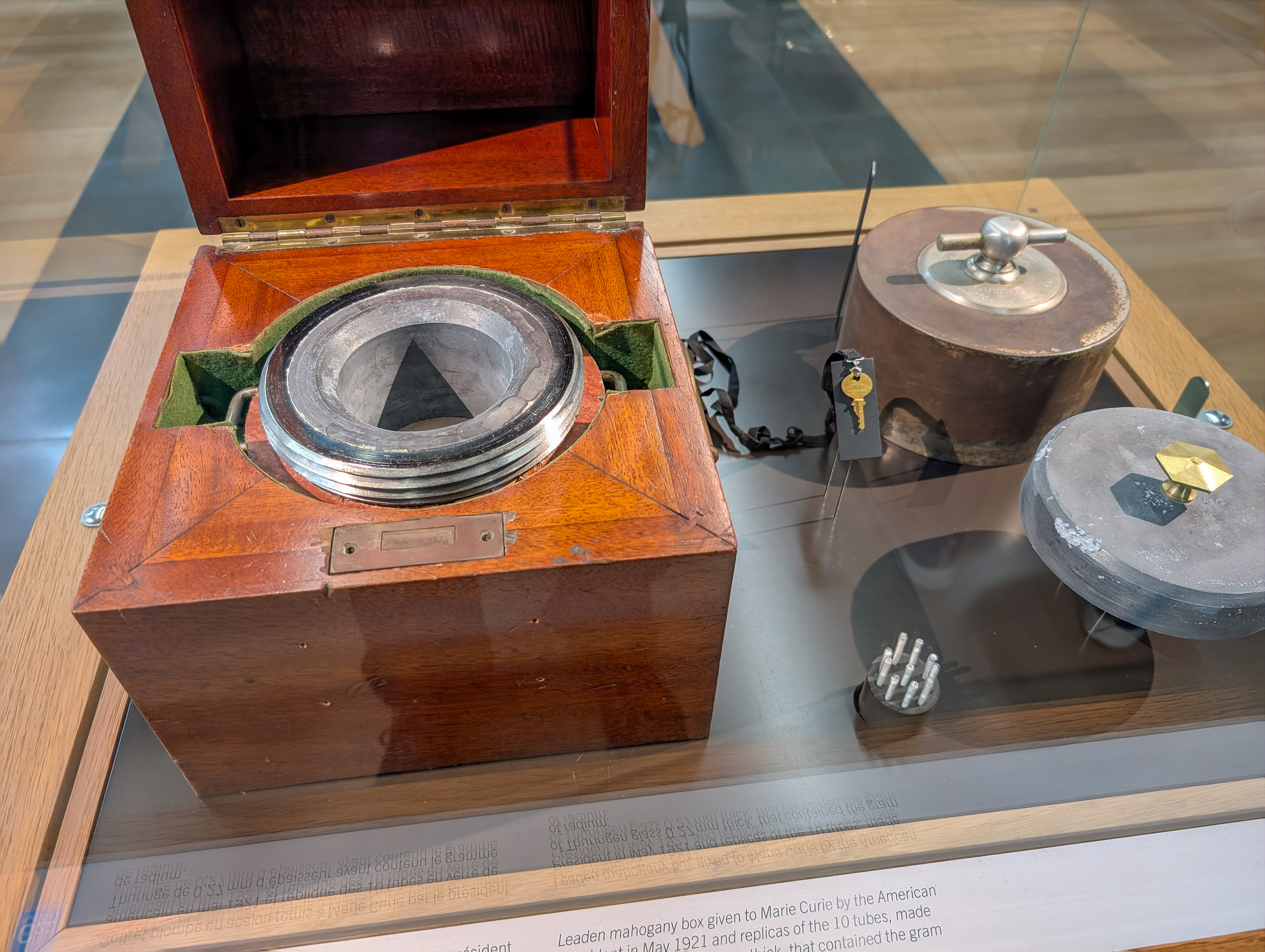
Lead-lined box which contained the radium, now at the Musée Curie in Paris

After a whirlwind of public appearances, Meloney and Curie traveled together to Washington, D.C., to receive the radium from President Warren G. Harding. The evening before the presentation, however, Curie balked when she discovered that the gift deed had been made personally to her: She insisted that it be redrawn so the gift from the people of the United States must instead "belong to science . . . I want to make it a gift to my laboratory". She asked Meloney: "Can we call in a lawyer?" And a "man of law, discovered with some difficulty at this late hour, drew up the additional paper with Marie. She signed it at once". The radium was presented to her in a lead-lined mahogany box on Friday, May 20, 1921, by Harding, with Meloney in attendance.

In October 1929, Curie returned to the United States for another tour and, accompanied by Meloney, for a few days in the White House with President Herbert Hoover, She stayed with Meloney when she was in New York and was ill part of this time. Curie spent her sixty-second birthday with Meloney and motored with her in Central Park, and then they visited the J.P. Morgan Library.

Meloney also "arranged for Curie to write an autobiographical work for an American publisher. The book would provide royalty income over the years". Researcher Lewicki opined that the retiring Curie and the outgoing Meloney "were rather different in temperament. Yet, they were able to connect even at their first meeting and forge a friendship for the remainder of their lives. . . . [Meloney's] boundless energy and selfless desire to help personified to the Curies [Marie and her daughters] the best of the American spirit".

=== Better Homes campaign ===
In 1922, Meloney was responsible for beginning a Better Homes in America movement, one that would "encourage the more general use of labor-saving equipment, the use of more artistic home furnishings, and the development of home-life with reference to high standards of wholesomeness and achievement". In that and the following year, she directed the campaign, which was financed by The Delineator. In 1923 and 1924 the campaign became national, with Secretary of Commerce Herbert Hoover as president and Meloney as vice-president or secretary.

In 1930, she financed the awarding of three gold medals yearly through the American Institute of Architects "to architects deemed to have designed the best small houses erected anywhere in the United States during the preceding year".

Meloney, as chairman of the New York City Better Homes committee in 1934, was instrumental in having a "Georgian-style" model home built on a vacant lot at Park Avenue and 39th Street in Manhattan "to serve as a demonstration for the average American family of beautiful and convenient housing which can be duplicated out of town at from $6,000 to $8,000". Eleanor Roosevelt and Meloney spoke over a national radio hookup at the dedication of what was called "America's Little House" on September 25, 1934.

=== Health and nutrition ===
Meloney was the instigator of a conference on food habits sponsored by the U.S. Department of Agriculture and held in April 1926 in Washington, D.C., and attended by twenty-five "nutrition and dietary experts". She asked for the conference after her magazine, The Delineator, discovered that there were no official standards to assess the weight of adults in the United States, "except some United States Army charts, formulated after the Civil War and corrected after the Spanish–American War".

More than 20,000 women wrote to The Delineator, . . . asking for advice on questions of weight, many of the resulting inquiries resulting from unfortunate attempts to conform to the fashionably slim outline. They showed that women were doing almost anything to get thin, regardless of the effect their efforts might have on their health. . . . Dr. [Wendell C.Phillips and Dr. Samuel Brown, President of the New York Academy of Medicine, agreed to call the conference so as to make up a table similar to that for children, based on weight, height and age, and to discuss the danger of unscientific weight reduction and determine, if possible, safe ways to increase and reduce weight.

Meloney was a member of the planning committee for a White House conference on child health and protection held in November 1930, and in 1931, as editor of the New York Herald Tribune Sunday Magazine, she established an Institute for Women, with an Institute Kitchen, about which she wrote:

Whatever else happens in the family, it must be fed. In no home is it a simple project. America spends millions daily on food. It is one of the costly items of life, and with unwise handling one of the biggest leaks in the family pocket-book — not only in money but in health and family peace. For this reason we have not only set up a model kitchen to simplify the labor of feeding the family, but we have also made it a joy to labor therein.

=== Society and community ===
In February 1925, Meloney was a member of the building fund committee of the Knickerbocker Hospital, which was to be erected at 130th Street and Convent Avenue. In 1929, she spoke at the dedication of a bust of the late Dr. Virgil Pendleton Gibney at the Hospital for Ruptured and Crippled at 321 East 42nd Street, giving tribute as a former patient of his.

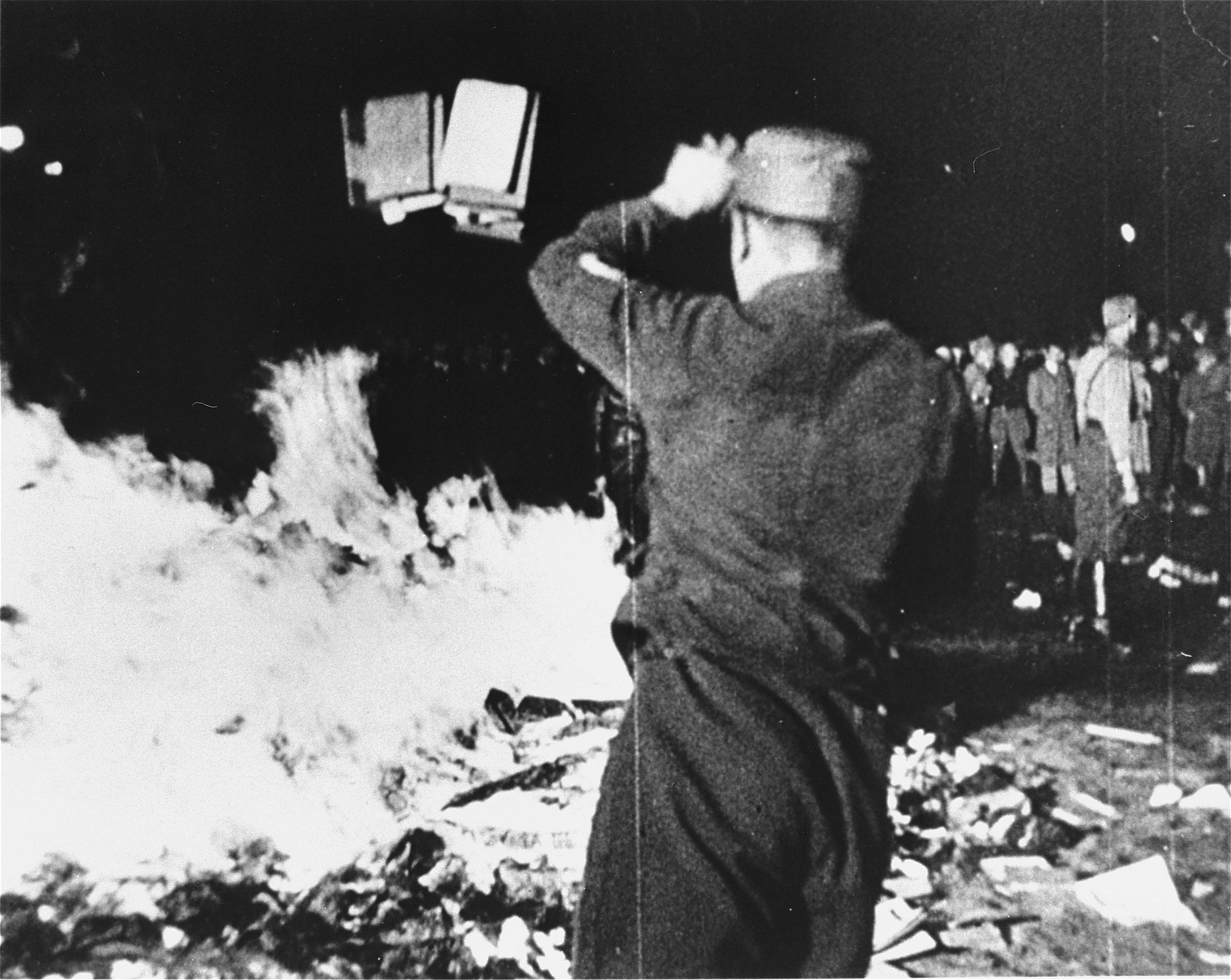
Nazi book-burning in 1933

For many years she was a member and board member of the Carroll Club, "an organization of 1,400 young Catholic business women of New York and vicinity". She was also a member of the American Centre of P.E.N. Clubs, and in May 1933 she joined a radio symposium on "Literary Freedom and Nationalism", with Dr. Henry Goddard Leach, editor of Forum magazine; Will Irwin, president of the American Centre; and Alfred Dashiell, managing editor of Scribner's Magazine, attacking the recent actions by the governing Nazi party in Germany in "banning of some German authors and the burning of their books and the books of other writers". "Asserting that bigotry had no place in a nation of intelligent people, she said the only weapon with which to fight ... was 'the courage to establish before the civilized world a standard of right thinking and right living and then persistently to support that standard.'"

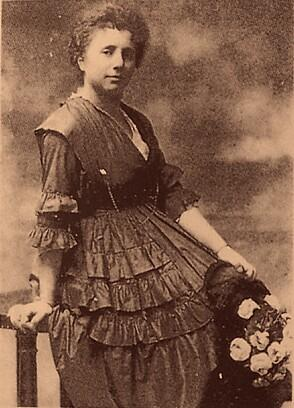
Margherita Sarfati

In April 1934, Meloney gave a studio party for Donna Margherita Sarfatti, Italian writer and art critic, in the studio of Leonebel Jacobs, One W. 67th Street. Guests included the Fiorello H. LaGuardias, Condé Nast, the Sinclair Lewises, the Norman Bel Geddeses, the Roy Howards, Dr. John H. Finley, the Ogden Reids, Dr. John Erskine, Nicholas Roosevelt, the Gutzon Borglums, Dr. and Mrs. Harry Woodburn Chase, the John O'Haras, the Brock Pembertons, the Joseph Auslanders, Mr. and Mrs. Robert Moses, Mrs. Helen Leavitt, Roy Chapman Andrews, Fannie Hurst and Louis Seibold.

Meloney was elected first vice president of the New York Newspaper Women's Club in May 1935, and in June of that year she presided over a festive gathering on the East Side when Mayor LaGuardia officially renamed Exterior Street as Marie Curie Avenue.

Her addresses while in Manhattan, New York City:

- February 1921: Thirty-one or thirty-three West 12th Street, between Fifth Avenue and Sixth Avenue on the lower West Side
- December 1925: Twenty-six West 9th Street, between Fifth Avenue and Sixth Avenue on the lower West Side
- October 1929: One Fifth Avenue, between East Eighth Street and Washington Mews, north of Washington Square Park
- January 1942: The Waldorf-Astoria Hotel, 301 Park Avenue

=== Eleanor Roosevelt ===
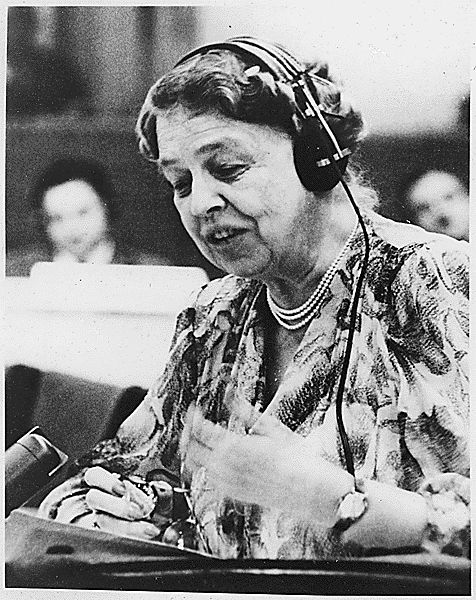
Eleanor Roosevelt

Meloney was a friend and confidante of Eleanor Roosevelt, wife of President Franklin D. Roosevelt. In her "My Day" column of November 18, 1938, Mrs. Roosevelt wrote:

We arrived in New York City yesterday afternoon and I went at once to see Mrs. William Brown Meloney. Here is a woman who, in spite of months of illness, has managed to keep her guiding hand on the production of a weekly magazine, has given her thought to the arrangements of one of the best known forums in the country, has worked on a book and talked to innumerable people. Her spirit has remained an outgoing spirit in spite of all the limitations of pain and weakness. There is something very stimulating in talking with this gallant woman.

After Meloney's death, Mrs. Roosevelt's June 29, 1943, column read, in part:

One never came away depressed from seeing "Missy" Meloney. . . . if I am sometimes weary and think that perhaps there is no use in fighting for things in which I believe against overwhelming opposition, the thought of what she would say, will keep me from being a slacker. She believed that women had an important part to play in the future. She not only helped such women as Marie Curie, who were great women, but she helped many little people like myself to feel that we had a contribution and an obligation to try to grow.

== Awards and honors ==
Belgium

- Medaille de Charleroi for service on behalf of children
- Ordre de la Reine Elisabeth for distinguished service to the Belgian cause in America
- Order of the Crown of Belgium

France

- Officer of the Legion of Honor (requested of the French government by Marie Curie)
- Médaille d'honneur des Assurances sociales
- Gold Medal for State Service, presented by Premier Édouard Herriot in 1924 "in recognition of her pioneer work in behalf of better homes in the United States and the impetus it has given to similar activities abroad"

Poland

- Order of Polonia Restituta, "in recognition of her services to science and to Poland, through gifts of radium to Mme. Curie"

United States

The Liberty ship Marie M. Meloney

- Honorary L.H.D. (doctor of humane letters) degree, Russell Sage College, Troy, New York, June 1936
- Launching of a Liberty ship named after her from the Bethlehem-Fairfield shipyard in Baltimore, Maryland, August 1943

== Biographies ==
- Julie Des Jardins, American Queenmaker: How Missy Maloney Brought Women into Politics (Basic Books, 2020)

== Correspondence ==
The Marie Mattingly Meloney correspondence file in the archival collections of the Columbia University Library includes letters from Sherwood Anderson, Irving Bacheller, James M. Barrie, Max Beerbohm, Arnold Bennett, Gutzon Borglum, Willa Cather, Jo Davidson, Walter de la Mare, Alfred Douglas, Lord Dunsany, Robert Frost, John Galsworthy, Rudyard Kipling, D. H. Lawrence, Sinclair Lewis, Wyndham Lewis, Walter Lippmann, Somerset Maugham, A. A. Milne, Charles and Kathleen Norris, Alfred Noyes, Frances Perkins, Edwin Arlington Robinson, Bertrand Russell, Eleanor Roosevelt, Carlo Sforza, Booth Tarkington, Ernst Toller, H. M. Tomlinson and H. G. Wells. "In addition to Mrs. Meloney's manuscripts of her own writings, the collection contains manuscripts of Louis Bromfield, G. K. Chesterton, Walter de la Mare, John Drinkwater, Havelock Ellis, Richard Le Gallienne, Mrs. Belloc Lowndes and Leo Tolstoy".

== See also ==
- List of women associated with Marie Curie and Irène Joliot-Curie
