= Henry K. Vingut =

American businessman (1871–1928)

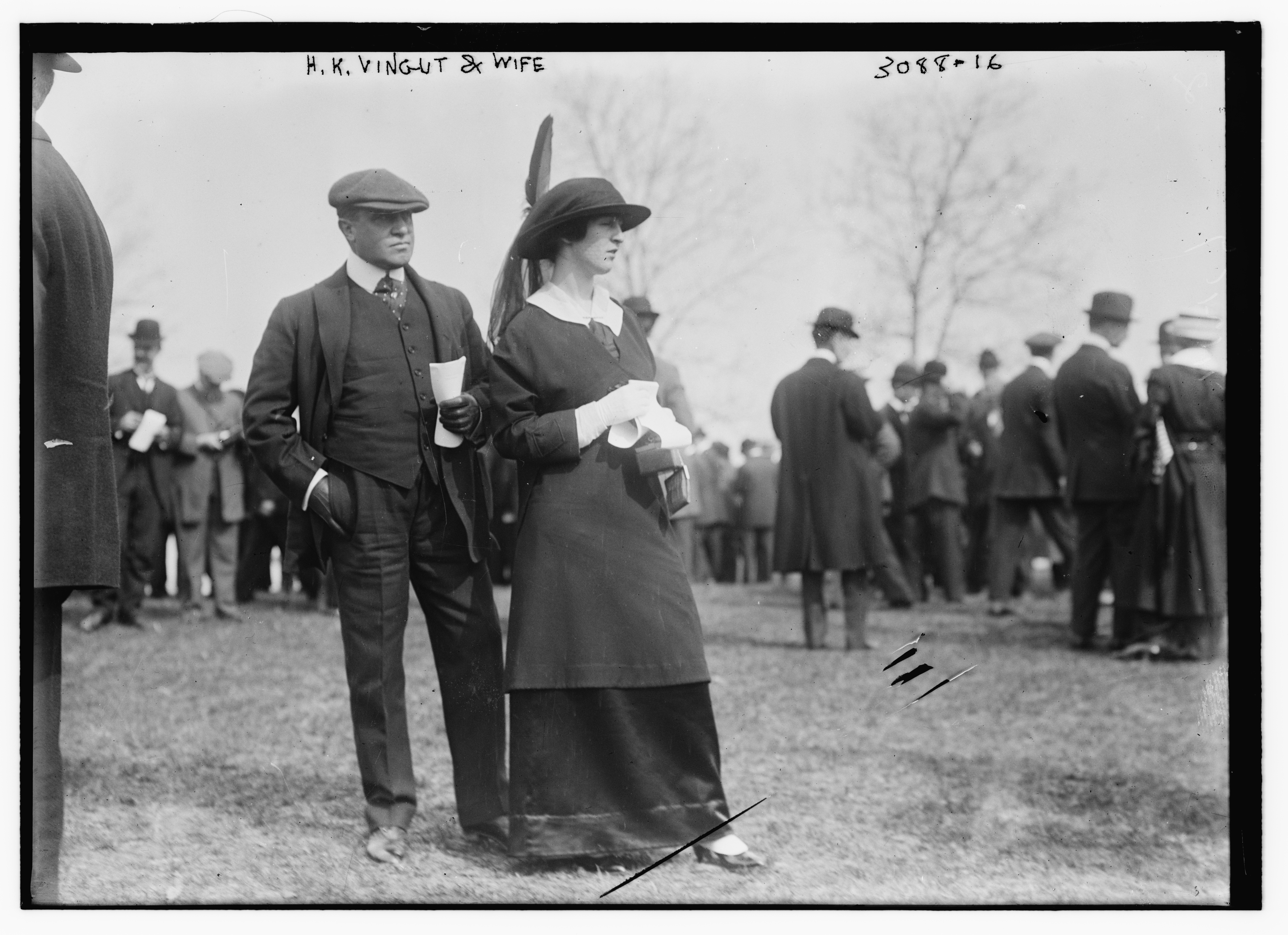
Vingut and his wife at the Meadow Brook Cup on May 9, 1914.

Henry Kermit Vingut (March 12, 1871–May 10, 1928) was an American horse broker and champion horse owner. He was born in New York City and graduated from Harvard University in 1891, after which he became a stockbroker. He married Edith Augusta Gaynor, daughter of the New York City mayor William Jay Gaynor in 1910. They divorced in 1919.

Among his customers was Isabella Stewart Gardner, to whom he sold a horse called Halton. VIngut continued to serve as the horse's trainer after the sale.

He was a member of many prominent sports and social clubs, such as the Racquet and Tennis Club.

Vingut retired around 1918. He died on May 10, 1928.

His brothers were George F. Vingut, also a cross-country rider, and Benjamin Van Horn Vingut, against whom a petition in bankruptcy was filed in 1909.
