= William Warnecke =

American photojournalist (c.1879–1939)

William F. Warnecke (c. 1879 – c. 1881 – May 26, 1939) was an American photojournalist.

== Biography ==
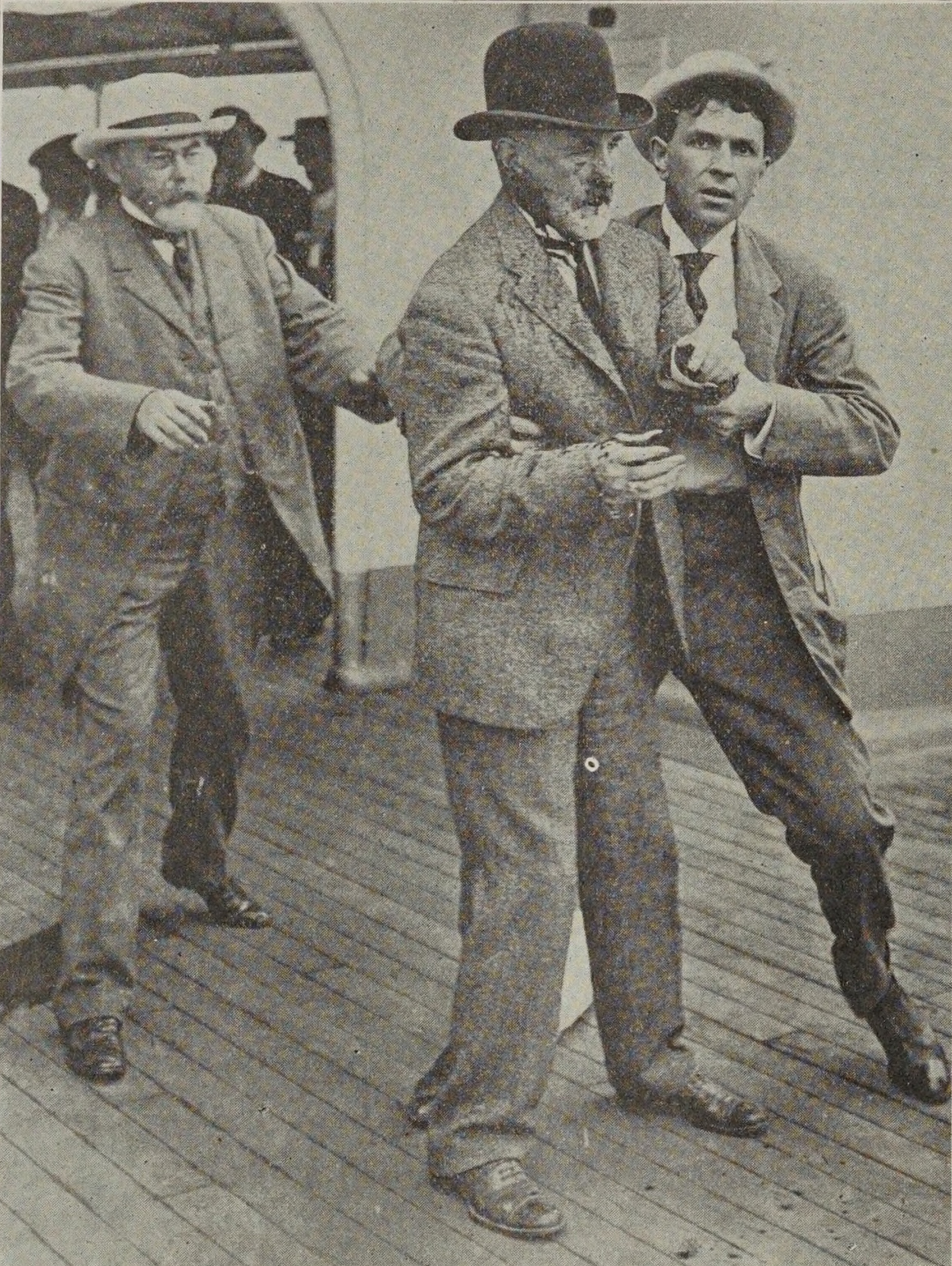
New York City mayor William Jay Gaynor being shot, 1910, photographed by Warnecke

Born c. 1879 – c. 1881, Warnecke had five siblings and was married with two children. He worked as a photographer for the New York World-Telegram, and during his c. 40-year-long career, had photographed more than 20,000 celebrities. Of the celebrities he photographed, he believed actor Lillian Russell to be the "most beautiful" and soprano Mary Garden to be the "most elegant". He also photographed the first submarine to dock at New York City. With photographer Wade Mountfortt Jr., he photographed New York City mayor William Jay Gaynor being shot in 1910. As Gaynor boarded SS Kaiser Wilhelm der Grosse, Warnecke photographed him as Gaynor was being shot. He received a $100 bonus for the photograph, plus $25 more given by Joseph Pulitzer. The photograph won the 1936 Press Photographers Award. Warnecke died on May 26, 1939, aged 60, while vacationing in Spring Valley, New York. Harry Warnecke, a fellow photographer, was either his brother or his son.
