= William Brown Meloney (1878–1925) =

American journalist (1878–1925)

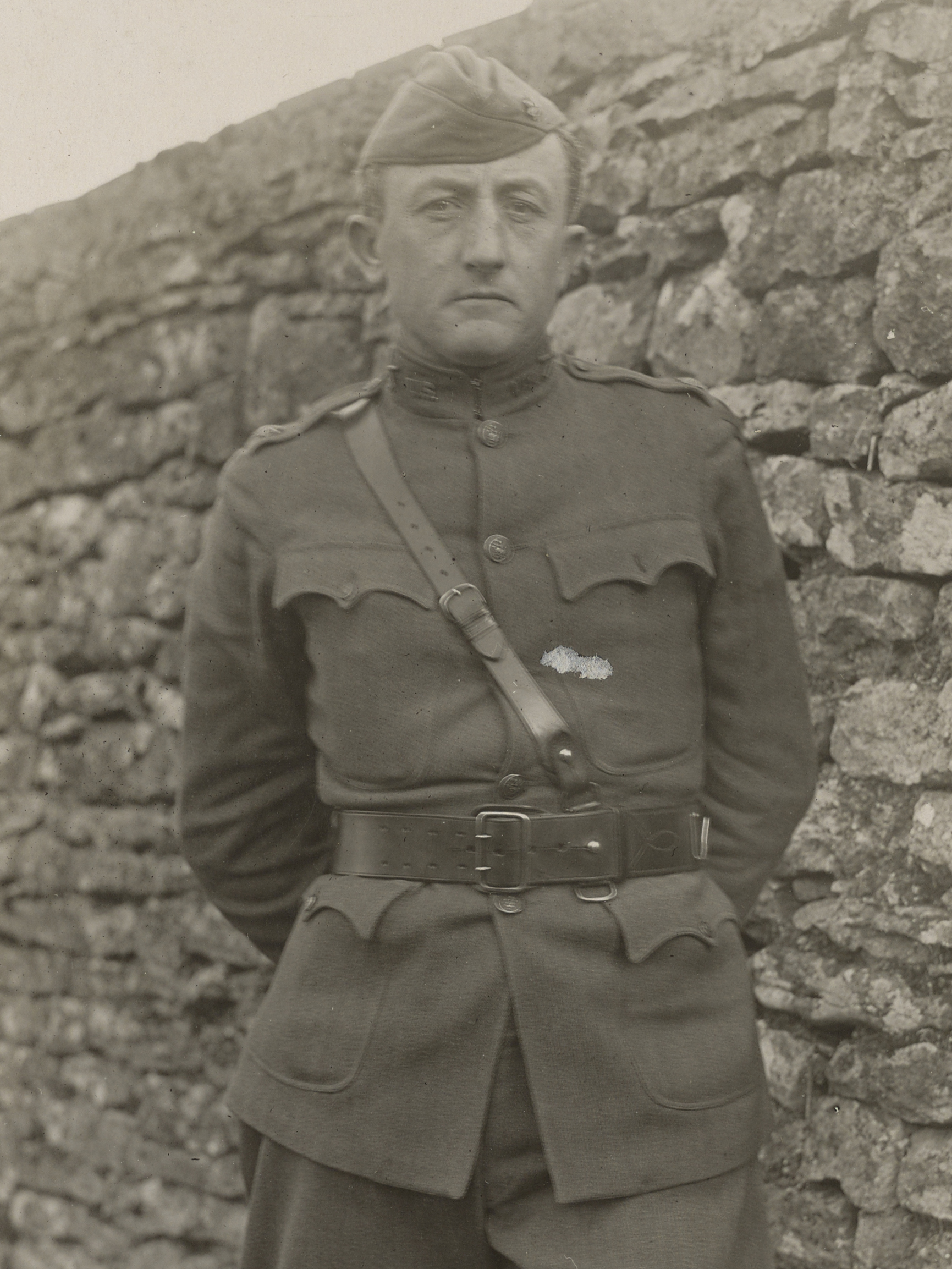
Meloney in 1918, serving in World War I

William Brown Meloney (June 6, 1878 – December 7, 1925) was an American journalist, writer, executive secretary to Mayor William Jay Gaynor of New York City and a historian of shipping.

== Biography ==
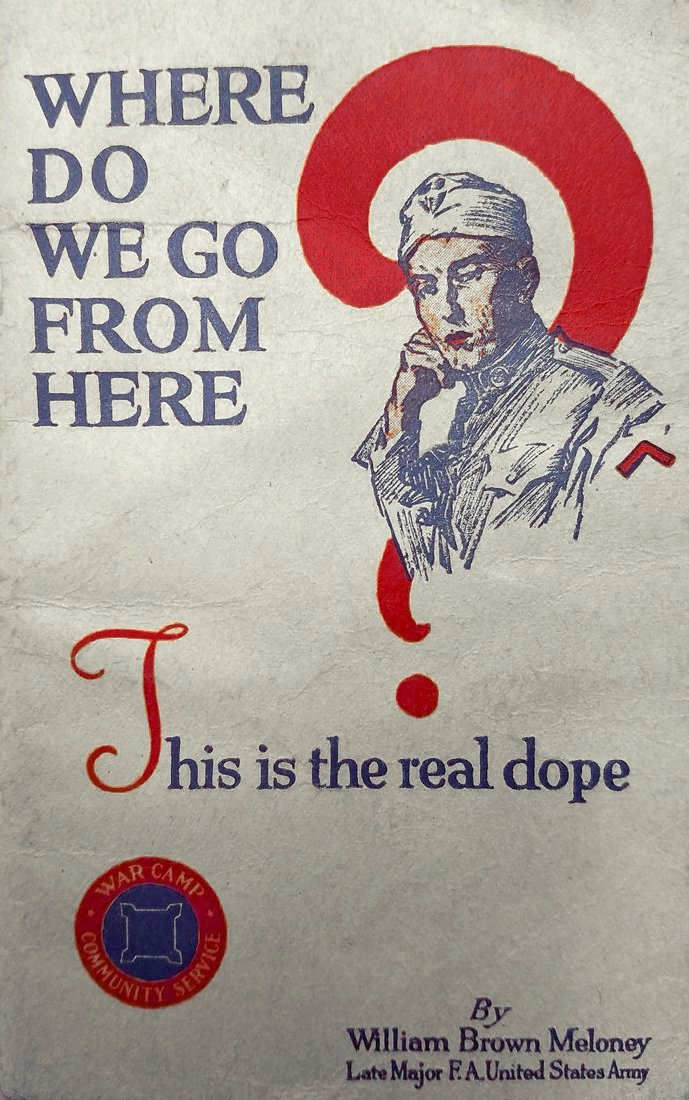
Meloney book for World War I veterans

He was born on June 6, 1878, in San Francisco, California. His grandfathers were a ship captain and a shipbuilder, ran away to sea at the age of eleven. In 1896, when he was eighteen years old, he became a shipping news and political reporter in San Francisco and also started writing fiction and verse and "resolved to do what he could to further the establishment of a powerful American merchant fleet." Meloney was the son of James Meloney of Boston, Massachusetts, and Addie Meloney. His father died in Somerville, Massachusetts, in April 1898.

In 1899, Meloney, as a reporter for the San Francisco Bulletin, was assigned by editor Fremont Older to investigate Police Lieutenant Frederick L. Esola, who was a candidate to be appointed as city police chief. Meloney testified before the city's police commission, and the evening after his testimony was finished, he and another Bulletin reporter were beaten by two men in a saloon at 206 Sutter Street. Suspicions were raised that the beating was connected to the hearing, but nothing was proven.

Meloney moved to New York City in 1901 and worked seven years for the New York World newspaper, "part of the time as day city editor." In 1910 he was appointed executive secretary by newly elected Mayor Gaynor, after which he wrote several novels and plays but concentrated on a history of shipping, The Heritage of Tyre. When his book was published, Secretary of the Interior Franklin K. Lane praised it as the "best thing ever written on shipping," and Theodore Roosevelt wrote that Meloney "had the vision of one of America's great needs."

He served with the Army in France, where he was gassed during the Meuse-Argonne offensive. After returning to the U.S. in 1919, he wrote a handbook for soldiers: Where Do We Go From Here? covering practicalities such as insurance and job-search after discharge. The War Department published five million copies. He was an editorial writer on the New York Tribune for six months and then worked for five years on a biography of John Purroy Mitchel, mayor of New York from 1914 to 1917, which he completed months before he died in his country home in Pawling, New York, on December 7, 1925. The manuscript was never published but is on file in the Rare Books and Manuscript Collection of the Columbia University Library.

== Legacy ==
His widow, magazine editor and journalist Marie Mattingly Meloney, and a son, also named William Brown Meloney, survived him.

== Other publications ==
Meloney also wrote about sea shanties, in a work that was published first in Everybody's Magazine in 1914, then in book form as The Chanty Man Sings.
