= Curtis B. Warnke =

Curtis B. Warnke "Curt" (April 18, 1932 – August 27, 2006) was an American newspaper editor and politician.

Warnke was born in Wood Lake, Yellow Medicine County, Minnesota and graduated from the Wood Lake High School. He went to the University of Minnesota and majored in history, political science, and sociology. Warnke lived in Wood Lake and owned the Wood Lake News newspaper from 1966 to 1994. He also wrote the column for the Wood Lake Messenger newspaper.

Warnke served in the Minnesota House of Representatives from 1957 to 1966 and was a Democrat. He died from cancer in Granite Falls, Minnesota. The funeral and burial were in Wood Lake.
