= Harry Warnecke =

American photographer (1900–1984)

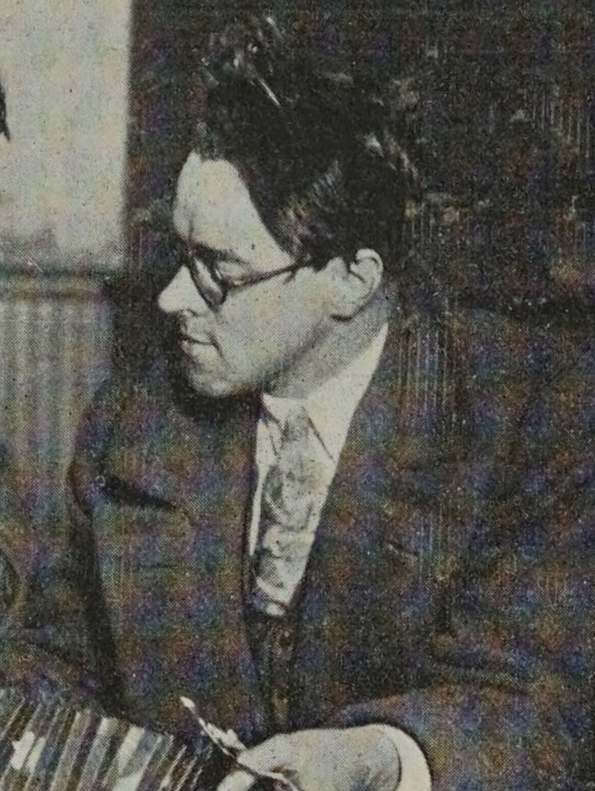
- Warnecke in 1926
- Born: August 26, 1900
- Died: February 1984 (aged 83)
- Occupation: Photographer
- Years active: 1921–1970
- Known for: Color carbro photography

Harry Warnecke (August 26, 1900 – February 1984) was an American photographer who worked for the New York Daily News, specializing in color portraits for its Sunday edition. From the mid-1930s, he and his assistants at his studio used the complicated carbon print process to produce full color photos of many notables of the time, including Louis Armstrong, Lucille Ball, George S. Patton, Dwight D. Eisenhower, among others. Twenty-four of the prints developed at his studio are now on permanent display at the National Portrait Gallery in Washington, D.C.

== Career ==
=== Early life ===
Harry Warnecke was born on August 26, 1900, and was either a brother or son of photographer William Warnecke. He joined the staff of the New York Daily News as a photographer in 1921, initially producing black-and-white photos for the paper.

=== Mother Cat Stops Traffic ===
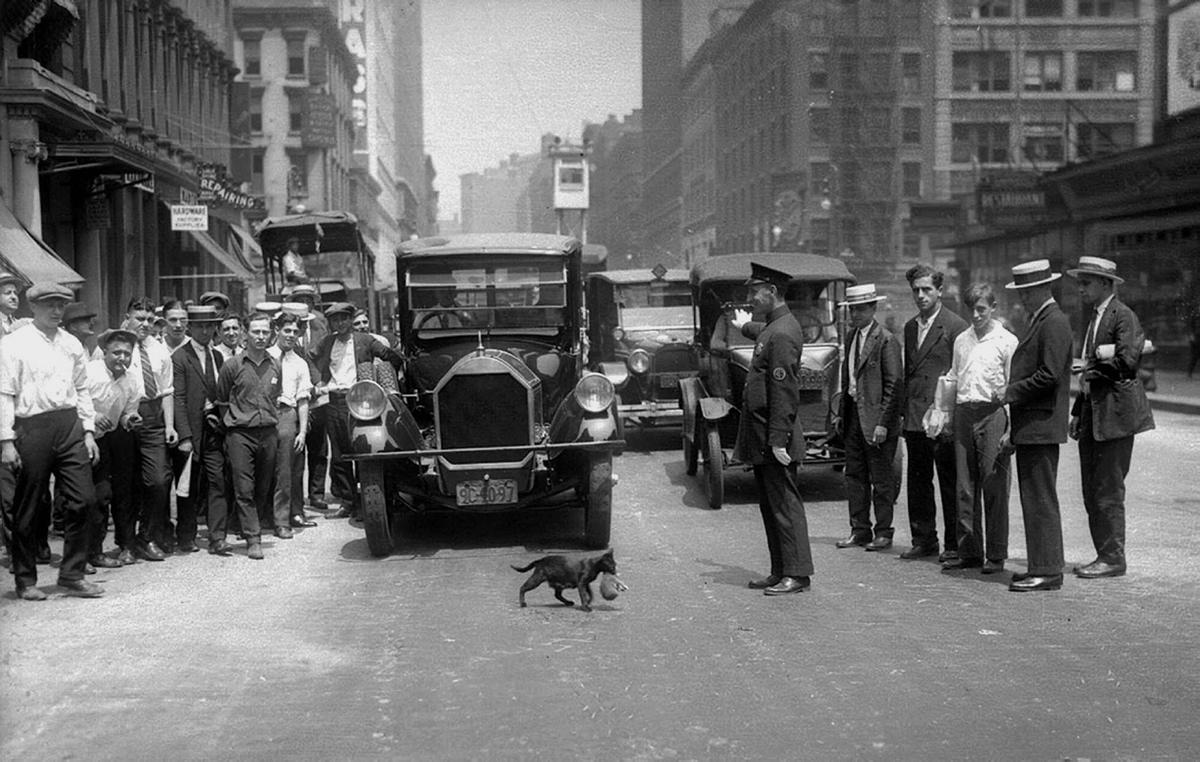
Mother Cat Stops Traffic, 1925

On July 29, 1925, Warnecke shot what National Press Photographer described as "one of the memorable news pictures in the history of photojournalism": a staged photo of police officer James Cudmore holding up traffic to let a mother cat cross through while carrying her kitten. The inciting incident for the photograph came when Cudmore had held up traffic on Lafayette Street at Walker Street to let the cat named Blackie carry her five kittens across the road. Upon being tipped off by a caller of the officer's deed, Warnecke was dispatched by the Daily News to the scene to take photos. Initially photographing Blackie with her kittens under a desk, Warnecke then requested the cat's owner and the policeman to re-enact the moment in a staged shot, to which both obliged. Despite the hold-up irritating drivers near the photoshoot, and a failed first attempt after the cat meandered away, Warnecke eventually took the historic photo of the cat crossing the road while carrying her kitten in her mouth. He even had the whole shot restaged again afterwards.

When the photo ran in the Daily News, numerous requests for reprints were sent in, and Warnecke was even commended by the police commissioner. In 2013, New York's Intelligencer called the story surrounding the photo "the No. 1 news story of 1925".

=== Police attack ===
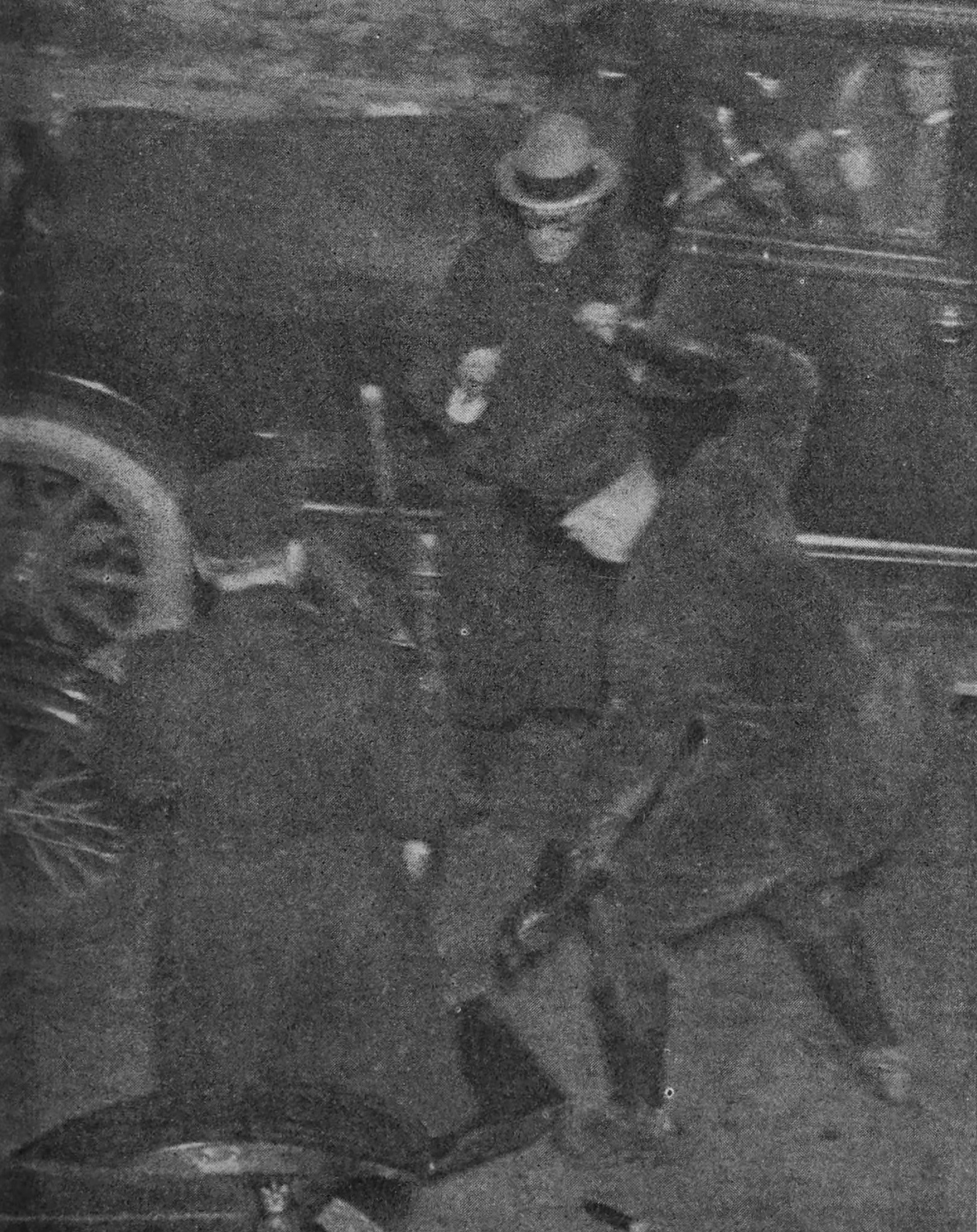
Police breaking Warnecke's camera in Passaic, 1926

While taking photos of the Passaic textile strike on March 3, 1926, Warnecke was one of many photographers at the scene attacked by police breaking up the strike. He was assaulted by six policemen and his camera was destroyed after he captured Karl W. Fasold of Pathé News being beaten up by police. The attack was witnessed by William Warnecke, who said that he was unable to obtain the names of the policemen involved.

=== Color photography ===
By the mid-1930s, Harry Warnecke developed an interest in creating color photographs via the color carbro process, which was a complicated and time-consuming process, but produced (according to NPG curator Ann Shumard) "wonderful, vivid color" while preserving its color for a long period of time. Warnecke was dean of the Daily News' color photography studio, and along with his assistants, shot full color portraits for the newspaper's Sunday Gravure magazine each week using this process. His subjects included Lucille Ball, Louis Armstrong, Dwight D. Eisenhower, and Orson Welles, among many other notables. Unusually, Warnecke credited all his assistants involved in the photographs.

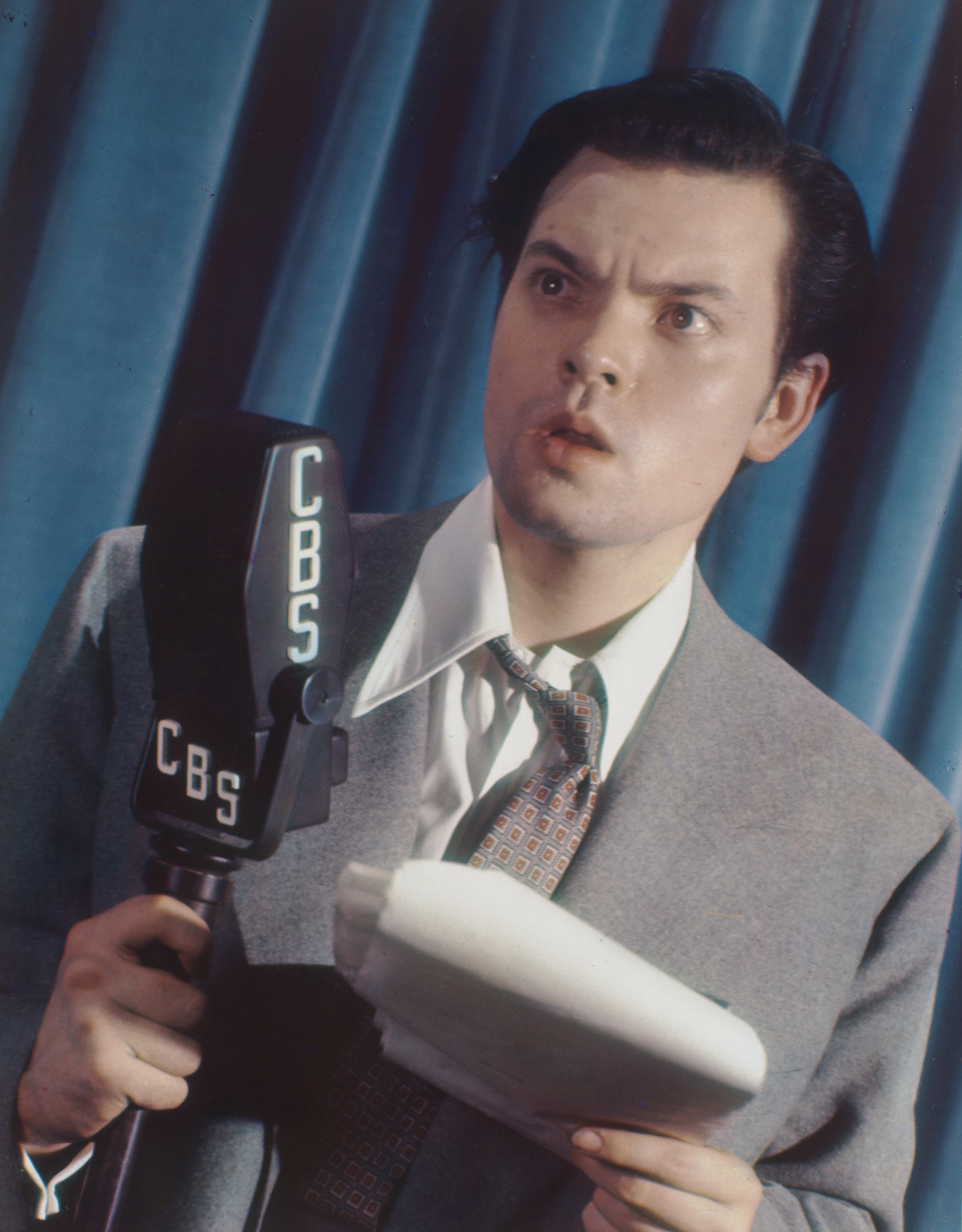
Orson Welles, 1939

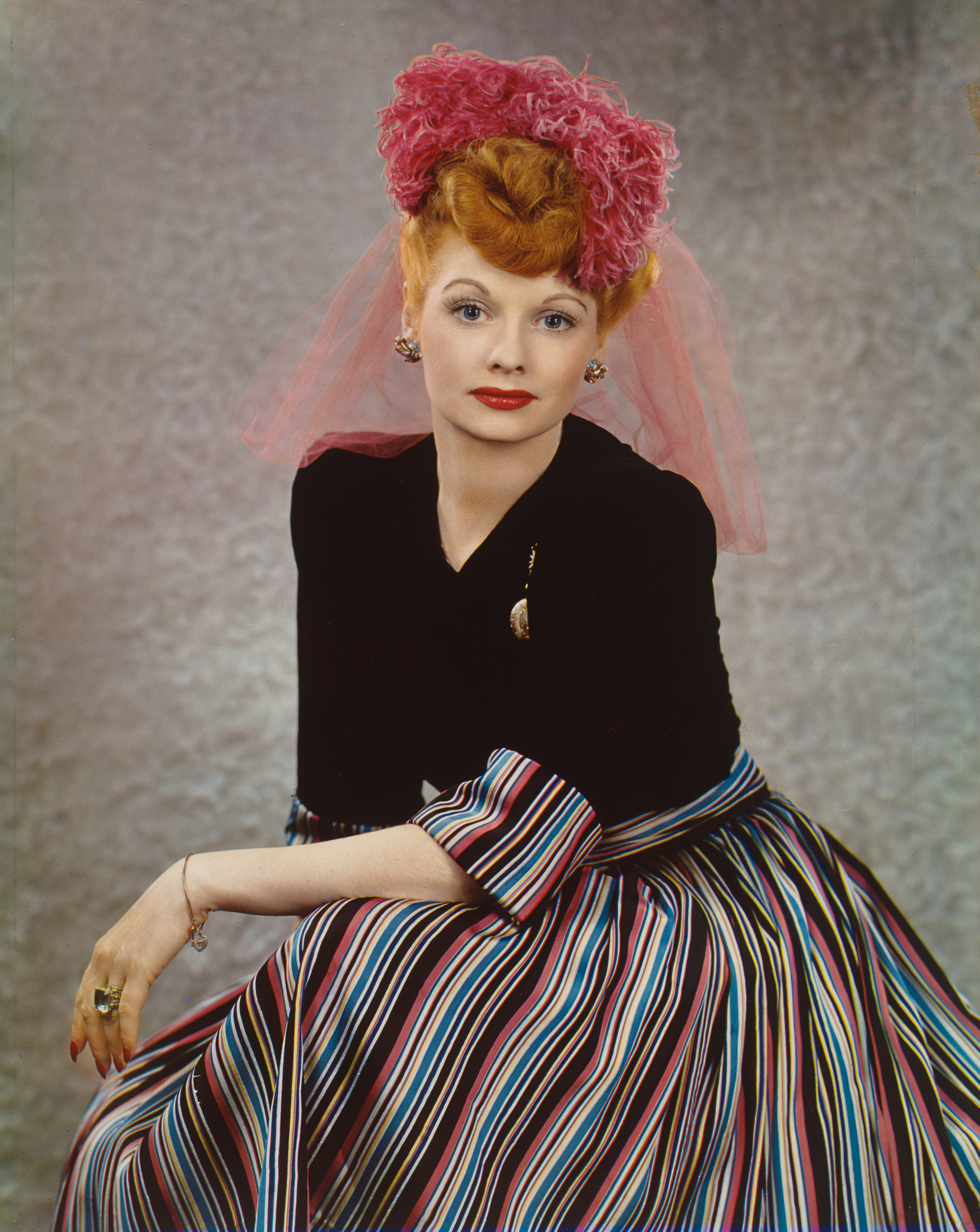
Lucille Ball, 1940

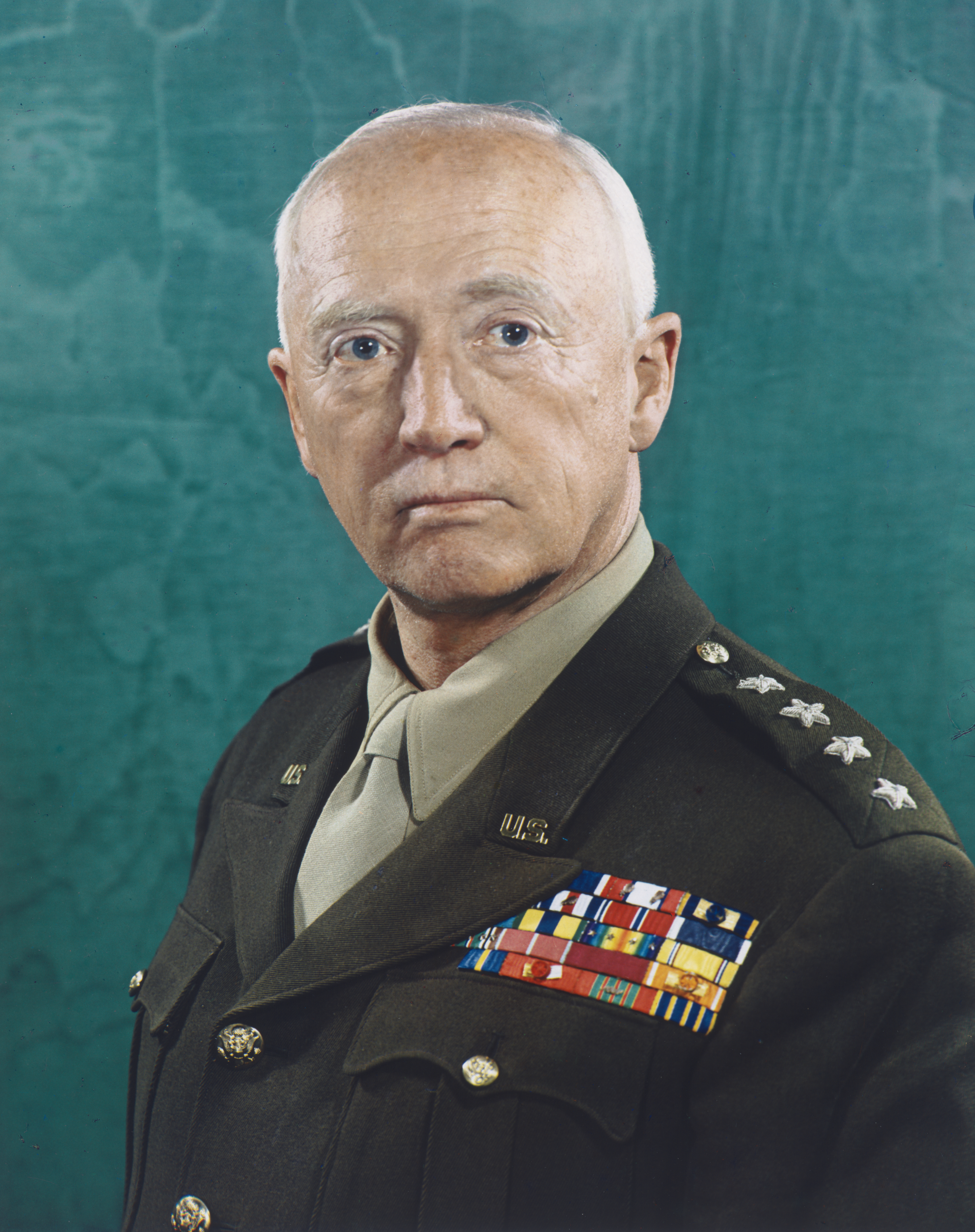
George S. Patton, 1945

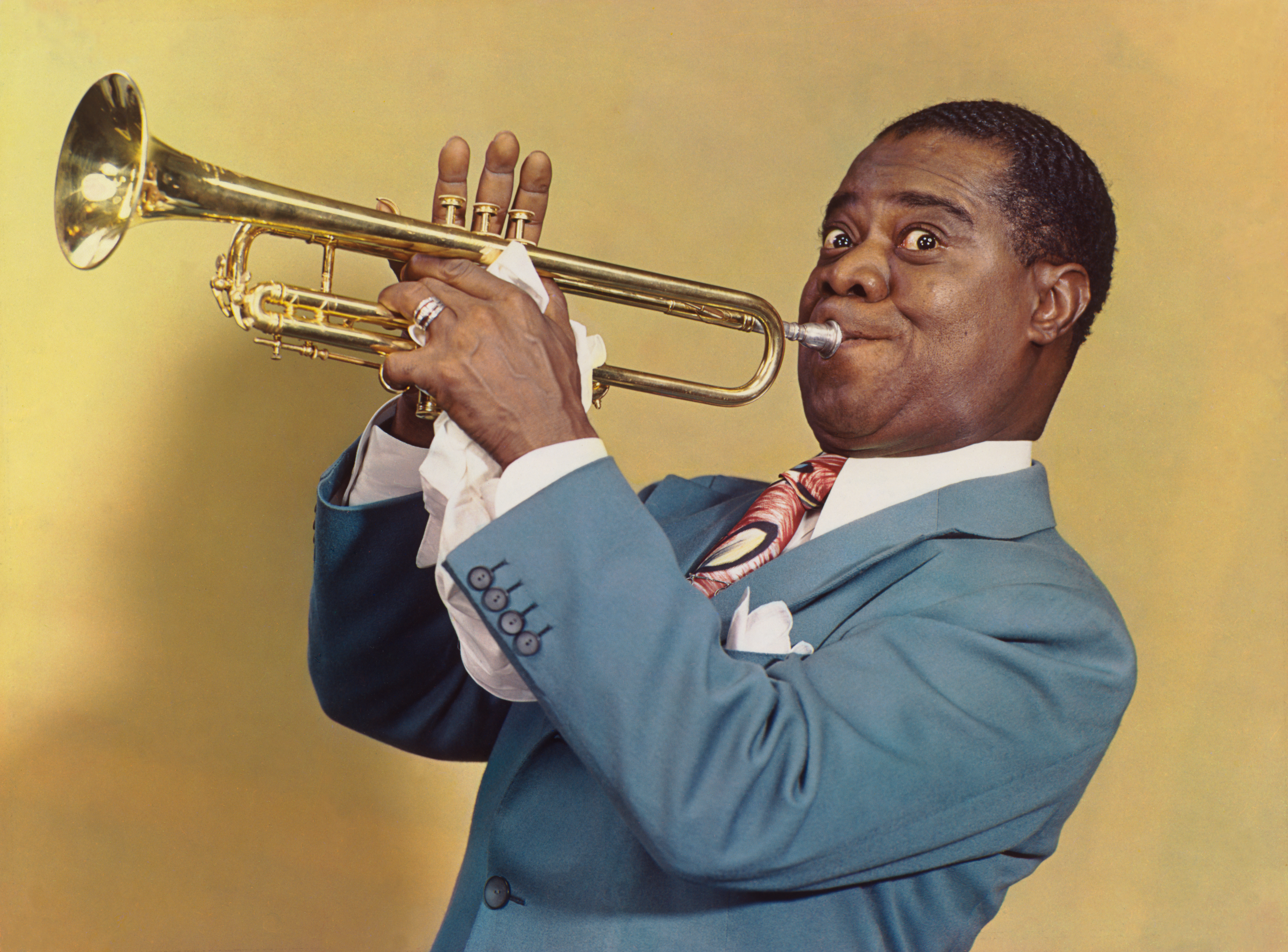
Louis Armstrong, 1947

24 of his portraits were sent to the permanent collection at the National Portrait Gallery (NPG) in Washington, D.C., in 2012, and were displayed that year in an exhibition entitled "In Vibrant Color: Vintage Celebrity Portraits from the Harry Warnecke Studio." Originally kept in his home, the prints were mostly donated by his widow, Elsie. The exhibition received a review from Neil Genzlinger of The New York Times, who commented on his bemusement at seeing full-color portraits of famous people seen mainly in black and white. He said that in Warnecke's portrait of WWII general George S. Patton, the subject appeared as if he "could work as a department store Santa." Ultimately, he praised the photos at the exhibition: "The black-and-white era is often regarded as a purist ideal, but the Warnecke Studio's works show that unless you had a big nose or a foam mustache, it's color, not black and white, that revealed the real you."

=== Later life ===
Warnecke retired in 1970, and died in February 1984, aged 83.
