= Wernicke =

Wernicke is a German surname. Notable people with the surname include:

- Bjarne Wernicke-Olesen, Danish scholar
- Brian P. Wernicke (born 1958), American geologist
- Carl Wernicke (1848–1905), German physician
- Catharine Wernicke (1789–1862), Danish pianist
- Christian Wernicke (1671–1725), German writer
- Eva-Maria Wernicke (born 1953), German luger
- Heinz Wernicke (1920–1944), German military officer
- Herbert Wernicke (1946–2002), German opera director
- Hermann Wernicke (1851–1925), German entomologist
- Julia Wernicke (1860–1932), Argentine painter and engraver
- Kenneth Wernicke (1932–2022), American aerospace engineer
- Otto Wernicke (1893–1965), German actor
- Roberto Wernicke (1852–1922), Argentine physician
