= William Jay Gaynor =

Mayor of New York City from 1910 to 1913

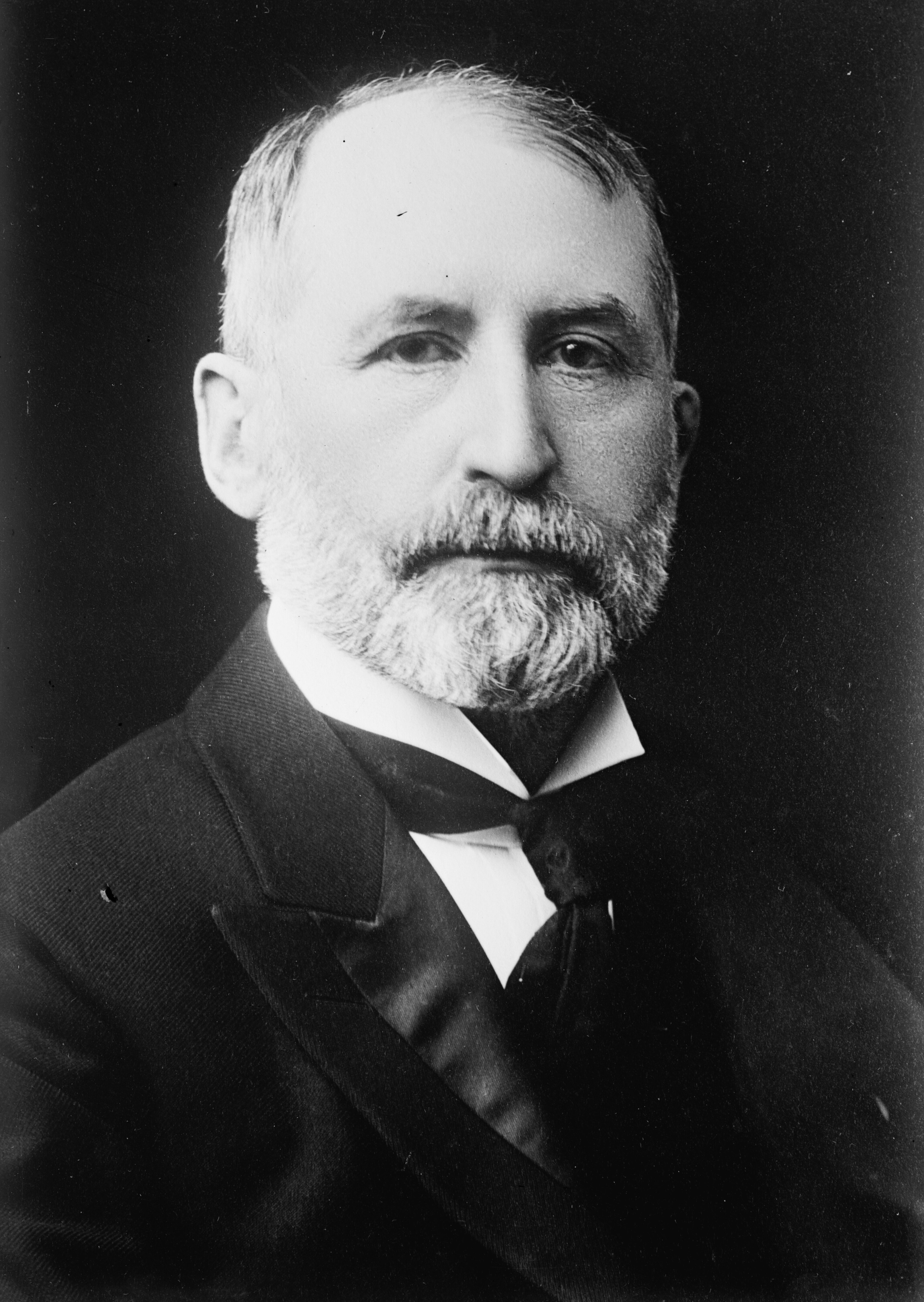

95th Mayor of New York City
- In office January 1, 1910 – September 10, 1913
- Preceded by: George B. McClellan Jr.
- Succeeded by: Ardolph Loges Kline (acting)

Personal details
- Born: February 2, 1849 Oriskany, New York, U.S.
- Died: September 10, 1913 (aged 64) On the Atlantic Ocean
- Party: Democratic
- Spouses: Emma Vesta Hyde (m. 1876; div. 1881) Augusta Cole Mayer (m. 1886)
- Children: 8

William Jay Gaynor (February 2, 1849 – September 10, 1913) was an American politician from New York City, associated with the Tammany Hall political machine. He served as the 95th mayor of the City of New York from 1910 to 1913, and previously as a New York Supreme Court Justice from 1893 to 1909. As mayor he was noted as a reformer who broke ranks and refused to take orders from the Tammany boss Charles Francis Murphy.

== Early life ==
Gaynor was born in Oriskany, New York, on February 2, 1849, baptized as William James. His parents were Keiron K. Gaynor, an Irish-born farmer and blacksmith and Elizabeth (Handwright) Gaynor. He grew up on a farm with seven siblings. As a boy, he developed an interest in wandering the countryside where they lived, exploring nature and trying to figure out why things were the way they were.

He was a studious boy, a trait which his father encouraged. As he was on the clumsy side, when it came to farmwork, his brother Tom usually took on the heavier chores. For his education, he first attended the local public school, then was sent to the Whiteboro Seminary. The Gaynor family were Irish and devout Catholics, thus, when weather permitted, on Sundays they would head to the nearby city of Utica to attend Mass at St. John's Church on Bleecker Street. As William entered his teenage years, he began to show a religious fervor that led his parents to think that he might have a vocation to the Church. Both to test this, and for reasons of affordability, he was enrolled in the Assumption Academy in Utica. This was staffed by the Brothers of the Christian Schools. William flourished in that school, and soon decided that he did indeed wish to become a member of their religious congregation.

In December 1863, he was sent to New York City to enter the novitiate of the congregation. This was located at 44 East 2nd Street. The date of birth he gave at his admission was February 2, 1848, thus he was still fifteen at the time he was received. He was given the habit of the institute, and named Brother Adrian Denys. He spent the next four years in this house, both in training and soon in teaching in nearby parish schools. In 1868, he was one of a group of Brothers chosen to be sent to San Francisco to take care of St. Mary's College there. They sailed from New York on July 16, aboard the SS Ocean Queen.

By this time, however, as well as the usual readings in history, philosophy and the Church Fathers suggested to the Brothers, Gaynor had been reading and absorbing the reflection of a wide range of writers, mostly the ancient Stoic philosophers. One lifetime favorite which he found was the Autobiography of Benjamin Franklin, where he found much that resonated with his own way of thinking. The book was to be his lifelong companion. As a result, however, by the time the small group of Brothers had arrived at their destination, Gaynor had lost his belief in organized Christianity and had decided to leave the institute. Because of his youth, he had never taken religious vows, as he was too young to do so under the regulations of the Brothers, thus there was no canonical impediment to his departure.

He made his way back home to Utica, where his family now lived, arriving late that same year. How he managed that journey he never shared, other than to say that it had not been an easy or pleasant experience. His father welcomed him back and helped him to secure a position with the law firm of Horatio and John Seymour, that he might read enough law to take the bar examination. This was to be the start of his entry into the political arena, as Horatio Seymour had recently served as Governor of New York, and had just run as the Democratic Party's candidate for president against Ulysses S. Grant.

== In politics ==
Gaynor would disappoint Tammany Hall when they nominated him for mayor in 1909. Elected to the New York State Supreme Court in 1893, and appointed to the Appellate Division, Second Department in 1905, Gaynor's rulings were often cited around the country. His reputation as an honest reformer helped win him election as mayor in 1909.

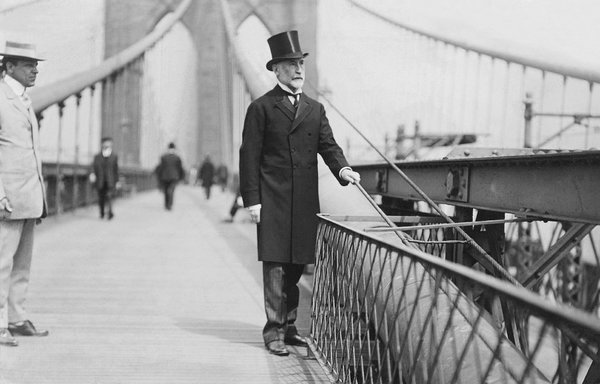
Gaynor walks across the Brooklyn Bridge to his inauguration.

On January 1, 1910, he walked to City Hall from his home in Brooklyn (#20 Eighth Avenue, Park Slope) – it was the first time he had ever visited the seat of city government – and addressed the 1,500 people gathered to greet him: "I enter upon this office with the intention of doing the very best I can for the City of New York. That will have to suffice; I can do no more."

In 1910 his daughter, Edith Augusta Gaynor, married Harry Kermit Vingut. They divorced in 1919 and she then married James Park. One of his granddaughters, Jean Rennard, married actor Fred Gwynne.

Gaynor's marriage with Tammany Hall was short-lived; soon after taking office, he filled high level government posts with experts and city employees were chosen from civil service lists in the order they appeared, effectively curbing patronage and nepotism. As mayor, he railed against efforts to thwart the further development of the New York City Subway system. A strong willed but compassionate mayor, Gaynor once remarked, "The world does not grow better by force or by the policeman's club."

H. L. Mencken,who covered the police beat and City Hall of Baltimore in his early days as a reporter, had respect for Gaynor both as a judge and as mayor.

Gaynor was that great rarity in American political history: a judge who actually believed in the Bill of Rights. When he sat on the bench in Brooklyn he tried to enforce it to the letter, to the natural scandal of his brethren of the ermine. Scarcely a day went by that he did not denounce the police for their tyrannies. He turned loose hundreds of prisoners, raged and roared from the bench, and wrote thousands of letters on the subject, many of them magnificent expositions of Jeffersonian doctrine. Unfortunately, his strange ideas alarmed the general run of respectable New Yorkers quite as much as they alarmed his fellow judges, and so he was always in hot water. When Tammany, with sardonic humor, made him mayor, he began an heroic but vain effort to give New York decent government....In the end, worn out and embittered by the struggle, he died unlamented, and today political historians scarcely mention him. Yet he was a great political philosopher and a great soul. It is the tragedy of the Republic that such men are so few, and that their efforts, when they appear, go for so little.".

== Georgist views on political economy ==
Gaynor read the first edition of Henry George's famous treatise Progress and Poverty said that Georgism was the "perfect" and "optimal" system ("admitted by philosophers and economists the world over"). However, he objected to what he perceived as George's intent to take all land rent for public use at once. Instead, Gaynor favored a slow transition over many years. He was unaware of the claim that removing other taxes would increase land rent, yet by his calculations there was enough land rent to replace all taxes with a land value tax.

== Assassination attempt ==
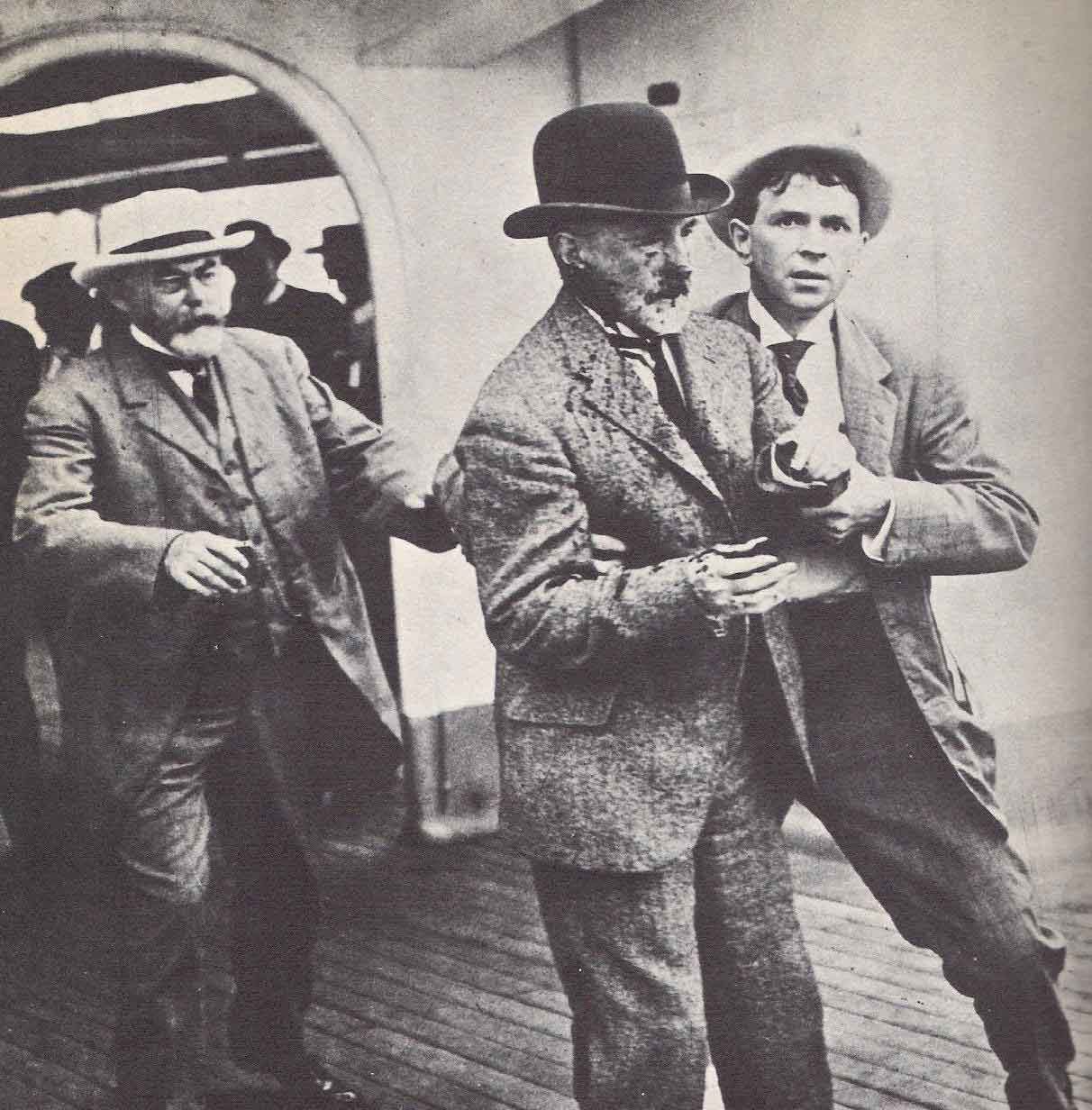
Gaynor moments after the assassination attempt. August 9, 1910. At left is Edward J. Lichtfield, a neighbor of Gaynor's, and at right is Jacob Katz.

Early in his term, Gaynor was shot in the throat by James J. Gallagher, a discharged city employee who had been a New York dock Night Watchman from April 7, 1903, to July 19, 1910. Gaynor remains the only New York City mayor to be hit by a bullet during an assassination attempt. The violent incident happened on board the Europe-bound SS Kaiser Wilhelm der Grosse, which was docked at Hoboken, New Jersey. Gallagher died in a prison in Trenton, New Jersey, from paresis on February 4, 1913, the same year as Gaynor's death. Observing Gaynor in conversation, New York World photographer William Warnecke snapped what he thought would be a typical, if uneventful, photo of the new Mayor. Instead, Warnecke captured the very moment that Gallagher, at point-blank range, shot a bullet through Gaynor's neck. It remains one of the most highly praised photographs in the history of photojournalism. Other photographs of the attempt were captured by Wade Mountfortt Jr.

== Death and legacy ==
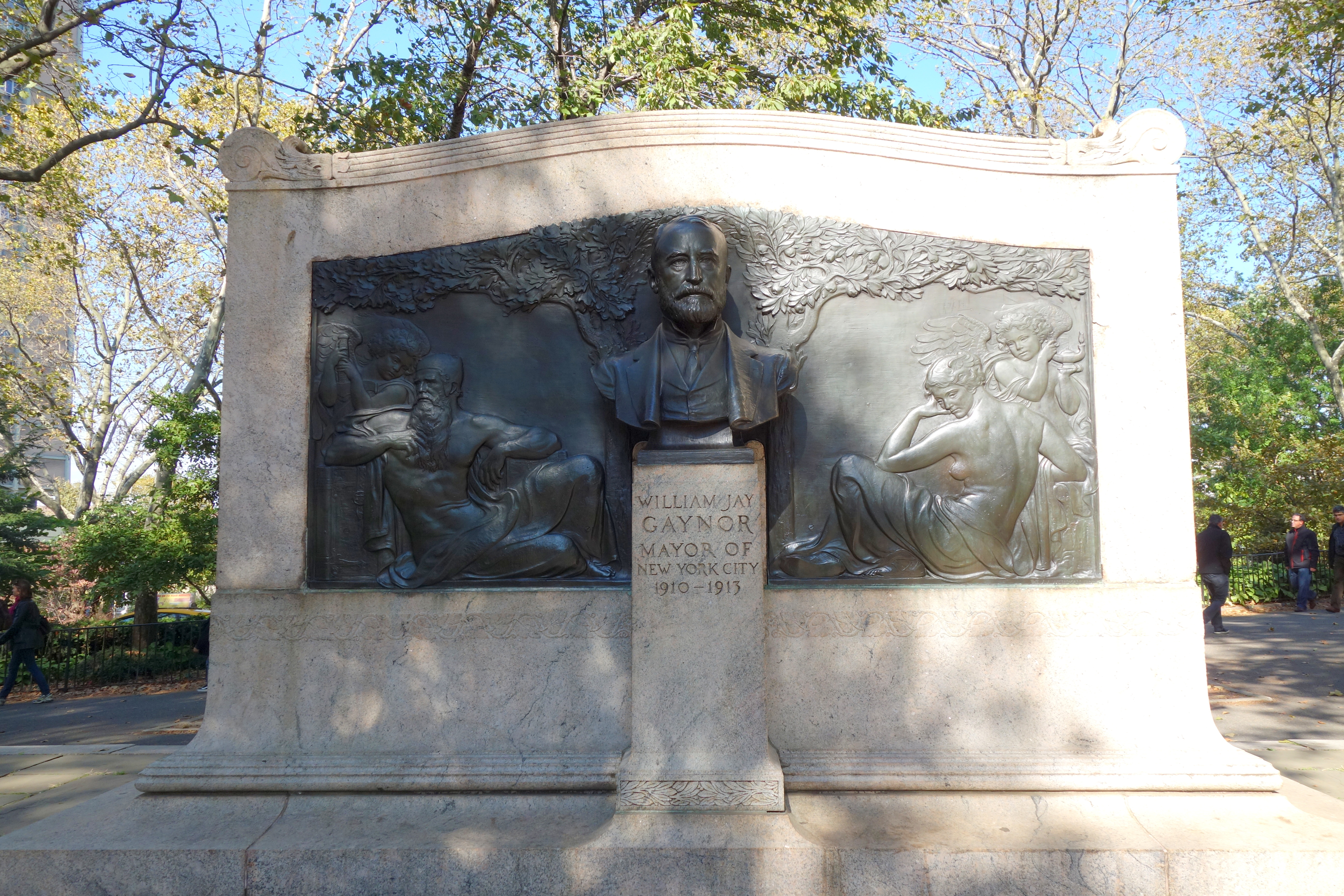
William Jay Gaynor's memorial in Cadman Plaza Park in Brooklyn

Although Gaynor quickly recovered, the bullet remained lodged in his throat for the next three years. During his term as mayor, Gaynor was widely considered a strong candidate for Governor or President. Tammany Hall refused to nominate him for reelection to a second term, but after accepting the nomination from an independent group of voters, he set sail for Europe aboard RMS Baltic. Six days later, on September 10, 1913, Gaynor died suddenly on a deck chair aboard the liner, aged 64. After his death, doctors concluded that he died of a heart attack, and that his old wound was at most a minor contributing factor. Gaynor is interred at Green-Wood Cemetery in Brooklyn, New York.

The Fire Department of New York operated a fireboat named William J. Gaynor from 1914 to 1961. There is a statue commemorating Gaynor in Cadman Plaza Park in Brooklyn.

== See also ==
- William Brown Meloney (1878–1925), Gaynor's executive secretary

Political offices
Preceded by George B. McClellan Jr.	Mayor of New York City; 1910–1913	Succeeded by Ardolph Loges Kline
