= William Brown Meloney (1902–1971) =

American writer (1902–1971)

William Brown Meloney at the traces of champion show horse Chasley Superman in 1969

William Brown Meloney V (May 4, 1902– May 4, 1971) was a journalist, novelist, short-story writer and theatrical producer.

== Biography ==
He was born on May 4, 1902, in Pawling, New York, to William B. Meloney IV and Marie Mattingly Meloney. Meloney studied at Columbia College, graduated in 1926, and lectured in English and comparative literature there. He was a fellow at the University of Paris in 1927–28.

He first became a lawyer and joined the law offices of William J. Donovan and managed his campaign for the Governor of New York in 1932. He later became a journalist like his parents.

In 1929 he had an affair with Priscilla Fansler Hobson, the future wife of Alger Hiss, who became pregnant with Meloney's child and then underwent an abortion.

Meloney was married first to Elizabeth Ryder Symons of Saginaw, Michigan, the daughter of Mr. and Mrs. James Shirley Symons, then to playwright and screenwriter Rose Franken. He had two sons by his first wife: The first was William Brown Meloney VI (1931–2005), and a second son born April 8, 1933.

In 1933, Meloney and Elizabeth were living in Pawling, New York, where he was editor of the Pawling Chronicle. He was also the local correspondent for the New York Herald Tribune and The New York Times.

In the mid-1930s, Meloney was writing motion picture scripts with Rose Dorothy Lewin Franken, and the two were married on April 27, 1937. By that time he had become a lawyer and was also an executive on This Week magazine, of which his mother was the editor. Meloney and Franken "relocated to Longmeadow, a working farm in Lyme, Connecticut, which, under their management, was adopted as a model of diversified farming by the local agricultural college at Storrs." The two continued writing, "both individually and collaboratively, for magazines, including Harper's Bazaar and Collier's. They sometimes wrote together under the pseudonym Franken Meloney." (Some sources also ascribe the "Margaret Grant" pen-name to the couple.)

He died on May 4, at his home in Kent, Connecticut.

== Books ==
- In High Places, 1939
- Many Are the Travelers, 1954
- Mooney, 1950

== Broadway productions ==
- Outrageous Fortune, November 3, 1943 – January 8, 1944
- Doctor's Disagree, December 28, 1943 – January 15, 1944
- Soldier's Wife, October 4, 1944 – May 12, 1945
- The Hallams, March 4, 1948 – March 13, 1948

== Filmography ==
Shared credit as writer

- Beloved Enemy, 1936
- Claudia and David, 1946
- The Secret Heart, 1946
